= Tennessee State Route 2 =

State highway in Tennessee, United States

State Route 2
- Dixie Highway; Broad Street; Lee Highway
- SR 2; secondary in red, unsigned in green

Route information
- Maintained by TDOT
- Length: 197 mi (317 km)
- Existed: October 1, 1923–present

Major junctions
- West end: US 41 / US 70S / SR 1 in Murfreesboro
- I-24 in Manchester; I-24 in Manchester; I-24 in Monteagle; I-24 / US 64 in Martin Springs; I-24 in Tiftonia; I-24 in Chattanooga; I-75 / US 74 on Chattanooga–Ooltewah city line
- East end: US 11 / US 70 / SR 1 at Dixie Lee Junction

Location
- Country: United States
- State: Tennessee
- Counties: Rutherford, Coffee, Grundy, Marion, Hamilton, Bradley, McMinn, Monroe, Loudon

Highway system
- Tennessee State Routes; Interstate; US; State
← SR 1	→ SR 3

State Route 2 (SR 2) is a 197-mile-long (317 km) west–to–east state highway in the U.S. state of Tennessee. It begins in Murfreesboro, in Rutherford County, and ends near Farragut in Loudon County. The route is both a primary and secondary route. Most of the route is unsigned.

It travels southeast from Rutherford County toward Chattanooga and then northeast from there to Loudon County. As nearly the entire route travels concurrent with U.S. Highways, the designation "Tennessee State Route 2" is seldomly used by the general public. The only exception is a small portion of the route that runs parallel to Interstate 24 (I-24) near Kimball. This portion has been removed from the U.S. Highway system and is no longer part of U.S. Route 41 (US 41); but the highway still exists and is in use. This is the only section of SR 2 with its own route signed (shown as a secondary state route).

== Route description ==
=== Rutherford County ===
SR 2 begins in Rutherford County in Murfreesboro as a secondary route where US 41 leaves a concurrency with US 70S/SR 1. US 41 goes southeast as Southeast Broad Street, now concurrent with SR 2. SR 2/US 41 immediately intersect SR 99 (Bradyville Pike), which it was also concurrent with, before leaving Murfreesboro. It becomes Manchester Pike and closely parallels I-24 before entering Coffee County.

=== Coffee County ===
After entering Coffee County, the concurrency passes through the community of Beechgrove, and becomes Murfreesboro Highway. They intersect SR 64 (Gossburg Road), which connects to Wartrace and Bradyville, and then SR 280 (McBrides Branch Road) before continuing southeast. They have an interchange with I-24 and continue into Manchester, becoming Hillsboro Blvd in downtown, and intersecting SR 53 (Woodbury Highway), which is also its southern terminus and it connects to Bradyville, then SR 55 (McArthur Street), which connects to McMinnville and Tullahoma, before intersecting I-24 once again and leaving town as Hillsboro Highway.

US 41/SR 2 then continue southeast, and paralleling I-24, they enter the community of Hillsboro and intersect SR 127 (Winchester Highway), which connects to Winchester and Viola, and then they go to the community of Pelham and intersect SR 50 (Payne Cove Road), which connects to Alatamont and Alto. They still continue southeast and enter Grundy.

=== Grundy County ===
They rise onto the Cumberland Plateau and enters Monteagle as Dixie Highway. SR 2/US 41 has an intersection with becomes US 41A, SR 56, and SR 15, where SR 2/US 41 becomes concurrent with SR 56 as they enter town from the southwest as West Main Street. The concurrency continues east through downtown as West Main Street before becoming simply Main Street east of downtown. US 41 and SR 56 leave the concurrency and turn north as Fairmont Avenue before going northeast to Tracy City. SR 2 turns south as Dixie Lee Highway (alone yet still unsigned) and enters Marion County before the highway becomes concurrent with I-24/US 64 as the Interstate starts to descend into a valley and Marion County.

=== Marion County ===
Once in the valley, SR 2 leaves the concurrency at Martin Springs via Martin Springs Road and Ladds Cove Road. It becomes Battle Creek Road and continues southeast, closely paralleling I-24/US 64 as it does so. It then crosses over the Interstate without an interchange and turns south and then southeast once again as it parallels I-24 into Kimball.

Once in Kimball, SR 2 becomes concurrent with US 64 (which leaves the Interstate just shortly before this point) and US 72, which goes through South Pittsburg, and moves northeast through downtown Kimball as Main St and then continues northeast to Jasper as Lee Highway. Entering Jasper, the concurrency intersects US 41/SR 150. Here, US 41 joins the concurrency while SR 150 terminates at the intersection. A short distance later, it intersects SR 28 (Valley View Highway), which connects to Sequatchie and Whitwell. Another short distance later, they intersect SR 27 (Griffith Highway), which connects to Powells Crossroads before leaving Jasper.

The concurrency moves southeast once again as Lee Highway before crossing Nickajack Lake/Tennessee River on the Marion Memorial Bridge and turning north and entering Haletown and intersecting SR 134 (J E Clouse Highway), which connects to Whiteville and SR 156. They then continue northeast, then south as the highway parallels the Tennessee River Gorge and works around Lookout Mountain. The highway continues to change directions as it becomes Cummings Highway and enters Tiftonia in Hamilton County.

=== Hamilton County ===
SR 2 once again intersects I-24 and then US 11/SR 38 (Birmingham Highway). SR 38 terminates here while US 11 joins the concurrency. They then intersect SR 318 (Old Wauhatchie Pike), which is a short connection to SR 148 and Lookout Mountain and then continues eastward into Chattanooga. In Chattanooga, SR 17 (Tennessee Avenue), which also connects to Lookout Mountain and SR 58, enters the concurrency as it becomes Broad Street and travels northeast into downtown.

In downtown, the concurrency once again intersects I-24 and continues northeast. US 11 and US 64 leave the concurrency here while US 41 and SR 17 leave the concurrency after five more blocks. US 72 terminates at this intersection (West Main Street) while US 76 begins and follows US 41/SR 17 southeast. SR 2, still Broad Street and unsigned, continues north for several more blocks and then turns southeast as East Martin Luther King Blvd, at the intersection with SR 316. SR 2 then intersects SR 8 (Market Street) immediately afterwards. SR 2 then becomes Bailey Avenue and once again becomes concurrent with SR 17 (South Willow Street) and then US 11/US 64 (Dodds Avenue) as SR 17 leaves and proceeds south with US 11/US 64.

US 11, US 64, and SR 2 go southeast as McCallie Avenue and through the Missionary Ridge Tunnel. Coming out of the tunnel, the concurrency becomes Brainerd Road, at an intersection with SR 320 (East Brainerd Road), and continues southeast for several blocks. It turns northeast and intersects SR 153, then it becomes Lee Highway and continues northeast as it leaves Chattanooga.

The concurrency briefly overlaps SR 317 (Bonny Oaks Drive) before the highways leave SR 317 (Old Lee Highway) and become concurrent with I-75. During this intersection, SR 2 becomes a primary route for the first time. The concurrency goes northeast for several miles before US 11, US 64, and SR 2 leave and once again become Lee Highway as they pass through Ooltewah and intersect SR 321 (Main Street/Old Lee Highway). The concurrency enters Bradley County a few miles later.

=== Bradley County ===
US 11, US 64, and SR 2 continue northeast through the McDonald community as Lee Highway. Entering Cleveland, the routes immediately have an interchange with APD-40 (US 64 Byp./US 74/SR 311), a bypass around downtown Cleveland. A few miles later, US 64 splits from the concurrency with SR 40 as SR 40 starts at this intersection. US 11/SR 2 turns north as Keith Street SW and then Keith Street NW and intersects SR 312 (Inman Street). The concurrency turns northeast and intersects SR 60 (25th Street), which goes to US 64/US 74 (Waterlevel Highway), I-75, and Georgetown, and then SR 74 before leaving Cleveland. The highway once again becomes Lee Highway, then becomes Hiwassee Street as it intersects SR 308 (Lauderdale Memorial Highway), which goes to I-75 and Georgetown, and goes through Charleston. US 11/SR 2 then crosses the Hiwassee River and enters Calhoun in McMinn County.

=== McMinn County ===
The concurrency remains as Lee Highway through Calhoun and intersects and has a short concurrency with SR 163 (Lamonville Road/Bowater Road) and then continues to the northeast. US 11 Business (US 11 Bus.) splits away in Riceville with SR 39 (Riceville Road) and goes northeast through downtown Athens as US 11/SR 2 continues northeast, briefly running a concurrency with SR 39 in Riceville before it heads into downtown concurrent with US 11 Bus., and around the northwest side of downtown Athens as Congress Parkway. It then intersects SR 30 (Decatur Pike) before leaving Athens. Just north of Athens, US 11 Bus./SR 305 (Ingleside Avenue) intersect US 11/SR 2 where US 11 Bus. terminates. SR 305 continues through the intersection and northeast to I-75. US 11/SR 2 continues northeast as Congress Parkway and into Niota where it becomes Willson Street and intersects SR 309 (Union Grove Road), a connector to I-75. US 11/SR 2 continues northeast and crosses into Monroe County.

=== Monroe and Loudon Counties ===
Continuing as a primary state route, It then enters Sweetwater and intersects SR 68 at which point US 11/SR 2 becomes South Main Street. In downtown Sweetwater, it changes to North Main Street and briefly turns north before turning northeast once again and intersects SR 322 (Oakland Road), a connector to I-75 and Vonore before leaving town as Lee Highway.

They then enter Loudon County and moves through the small town of Philadelphia, intersecting SR 323 (Pond Creek Road), a connector to I-75. US 11/SR 2 continues northeast as Lee Highway and into Loudon. It intersects SR 72 and enters downtown. It goes straight through town as Mulberry Street and then crosses the Tennessee River. After crossing the river, US 11/SR 2 once again becomes Lee Highway and intersect SR 324 (Sugar Limb Road), a connector to I-75. They then leave Loudon continues generally northeast into Lenoir City.

In Lenoir City, the concurrency becomes West Broadway St and then East Broadway St before intersecting the US 321, SR 73, and SR 95 (Lamar Alexander Parkway) concurrency in downtown. US 11/SR 2 then leaves Lenoir City and goes north. SR 2 becomes secondary once again after its intersection with US 321 until its end; It turns northeast, but then goes north again until SR 2 terminates at US 70/SR 1 in Dixie Lee Junction. US 11 then continues with US 70/SR 1 into Knox County (as Kingston Pike) and into Farragut and Knoxville.

== Junction list ==
County	Location	mi	km	Destinations	Notes
Rutherford	Murfreesboro	0.00	0.00	US 41 north / SR 99 west (Broad Street) / US 70S / SR 1 (Mercury Boulevard)	Western terminus of SR 2 and SR 99 overlap; road begins concurrency with US 41; US 70S/SR 1 overlap with US 41 ends; SR 2 begins as an unsigned secondary route
Rutherford	Murfreesboro			SR 99 east (Bradyville Pike) – Bradyville	East end of SR 99 overlap
Coffee	Beechgrove			SR 64 west (Beech Grove Road) / SR 64 east (Gossburg Road)	State Route to Secondary Route transition for SR 64; west to I-24 exit 97
Coffee	Beechgrove			SR 280 east (McBrides Branch Road)	Western terminus of SR 280
Coffee	Manchester			I-24 – Nashville, Chattanooga	I-24 exit 105
Coffee	Manchester			SR 53 north (Woodbury Highway) – Bradyville	Southern terminus of SR 53
Coffee	Manchester			SR 55 (McArthur Street/McMinnville Highway) – Lynchburg, McMinnville	
Coffee	Manchester			I-24 – Nashville, Chattanooga	I-24 exit 114
Coffee	Hillsboro			SR 127 (Winchester Highway) – Winchester, Viola	
Coffee	Pelham			SR 50 (Payne Cove Road) – Alto, Altamont	West to I-24/US 64 at Exit 127
Grundy	Monteagle			US 41A south (West Main Street/SR 15/SR 56) / SR 15 / SR 56 – Sewanee	Southern terminus of US 41A; Eastern terminus of SR 15; West end of SR 56 overlap
Grundy	Monteagle			US 41 south (Fairmount Avenue/SR 56) / SR 56 – Tracy City	East end of US 41/SR 56 overlap
Grundy	Monteagle			I-24 west / US 64 west – Nashville	West end of I-24/US 64 overlap; I-24 Exit 135
Marion	Martin Springs			I-24 east / US 64 east – Chattanooga	Eastern terminus of I-24/US 64 concurrency; I-24 exit 143
Marion	Kimball			US 64 west / US 72 west (N Cedar Avenue/SR 27 west) – South Pittsburg	Western terminus of US 64/US 72/SR 27 concurrency; to I-24 exit 152
Marion	Jasper			US 41 north / SR 28 (SR 27 east) – Whitwell, Tracy City	Interchange; eastern end of unsigned SR 27 concurrency; western end of US 41 concurrency
Marion				SR 27 (Griffin Highway) – Powell's Crossroads	South to I-24 exit 158
Marion				Marion Memorial Bridge over the Tennessee River	
Marion	Haletown			SR 134 east (J E Clouse Highway) – Whiteside	Western terminus of SR 134
Hamilton	Tiftonia			I-24 – Nashville, Chattanooga	I-24 Exit 174
Hamilton	Tiftonia			US 11 south (Birmingham Highway/SR 38)	Western end of US 11 concurrency; northern terminus of SR 38
Hamilton	Tiftonia			SR 318 south (Old Wauhatchie Pike) – Lookout Mountain	Northern terminus of SR 318
Hamilton	Tiftonia			SR 148 south (Lookout Mountain Parkway) – Lookout Mountain	Northern terminus of SR 148; No right turns are allowed from eastbound SR–2 onto 148
Hamilton	Chattanooga			SR 17 (Tennessee Avenue) to SR 58 – Incline, Rock City	Western end of SR 17 concurrency
Hamilton	Chattanooga			US 27 north (I-124/SR 27/SR 29) – Downtown, Red Bank	Northbound exit and southbound entrance
Hamilton	Chattanooga			US 11 north / US 64 east	Eastern end of US 11 / US 64 concurrency
Hamilton	Chattanooga			US 41 south / US 72 east / SR 17 north	Eastern end of US 41 / US 72 concurrency
Hamilton	Chattanooga			SR 316 west (Martin Luther King Boulevard)	SR 2 turns from Broad Street to Martin Luther King Boulevard; eastern terminus of SR 316; MLK Blvd (SR 316) runs west to northbound US 27 at exit 1
Hamilton	Chattanooga			SR 8 (Market Street)	
Hamilton	Chattanooga			SR 17 (Willow Street)	
Hamilton	Chattanooga			US 11 / US 64 (Dodds Avenue)	Western end of US 11 / US 64 concurrency; Dodds Avenue continues north as Glenwood Drive
Hamilton	Chattanooga			McCallie Tunnels under Missionary Ridge	
Hamilton	Chattanooga			SR 320 east (East Brainerd Road) – East Brainerd	Western terminus of SR 320
Hamilton	Chattanooga			SR 153 – Soddy-Daisy, Falling Water	SR 153 exit 1
Hamilton	Chattanooga			SR 317 west (Bonny Oaks Drive) – Tyner	Western end of SR 317 concurrency
Hamilton	Chattanooga			I-75 / US 74 – Atlanta	Western end of I-75 / US 74 concurrency; I-75 exit 7
Hamilton	Chattanooga			SR 317 east (Apison Pike) – Ooltewah, Collegedale	Northern end of SR 317 concurrency; I-75 exit 9
Hamilton	Ooltewah			I-75 / US 74 – Knoxville	Eastern end of I-75 / US 74 concurrency; I-75 exit 11; SR 2 becomes an unsigned primary highway.
Hamilton	Ooltewah			SR 321 south (Main Street) – Collegedale, East Brainerd	Northern terminus of SR 321
Bradley	Cleveland			US 64 Byp. (APD-40/SR 311) / US 74	Interchange on US 64 Bypass (APD-40)
Bradley	Cleveland			US 64 east / US 11 north	Southern end of US 11 Bypass; northern end of US 11/US 64 concurrency; western terminus of SR 40
Bradley	Cleveland			SR 312 (Harrison Pike/W. Inman Street)	
Bradley	Cleveland			SR 60 (25th Street NW) to I-75 – Dayton, Dalton	
Bradley	Cleveland			US 11 south (Ocoee Street/SR 74) – Cleveland	Northern terminus of US 11 Bypass and SR 74; southern end of US 11 concurrency
Bradley	Cleveland			Paul Huff Parkway	Eastern terminus of Paul Huff Parkway
Bradley	Charleston			SR 308 west (Lauderdale Memorial Highway) to I-75	Eastern terminus of SR 308
Hiwassee River				Bridge over the Hiwassee River	
McMinn	Calhoun			SR 163 east (Bowater Road) – Downtown Calhoun, Delano	Western end of SR 163 concurrency
McMinn	Calhoun			SR 163 west (Lamonville Road) to I-75	Eastern end of SR 163 concurrency
McMinn	Riceville			US 11 Bus. north / SR 39 east (Riceville Road) – Downtown Athens, Englewood	Western end of SR 39 concurrency; southern terminus of US 11 Business
McMinn	Riceville			SR 39 west (Riceville Road) to I-75 – Decatur	Eastern end of SR 39 concurrency
McMinn	Athens			SR 30 (Decatur Pike) – Dayton, Etowah	West to I-75 at Exit 49
McMinn	Athens			US 11 Bus. (Redfern Drive / North Jackson Street) – Downtown Athens	Northern terminus of US 11 Business
McMinn	Athens			SR 305 (Ingleside Avenue) – I-75, Downtown Athens	West to I-75 at Exit 52
McMinn	Niota			SR 309 west (Union Grove Road) to I-75	Eastern terminus of SR 309
Monroe	Sweetwater			SR 68 (New Highway 68) – Spring City, Madisonville	West to I-75 at Exit 60
Monroe	Sweetwater			SR 322 (Oakland Road) to I-75 – Vonore	
Loudon	Philadelphia			SR 323 west (Pond Creek Road) to I-75	Eastern terminus of SR 323
Loudon	Loudon			SR 72 (Loudon Highway) to I-75 – Kingston	
Loudon	Loudon			Congressman John J. Duncan Jr. Loudon County Veterans Memorial Bridge over the Tennessee River	
Loudon	Loudon			SR 324 west (Sugar Limb Road) to I-75	Eastern terminus of SR 324
Loudon	Lenoir City			US 321 (Lamar Alexander Parkway/SR 73/SR 95) – Oak Ridge, Greenback, Maryville	SR 2 turns secondary
Loudon	Dixie Lee Junction			US 11 north / US 70 (Kingston Pike/SR 1) / SR 1 – Kingston, Knoxville	Eastern terminus of SR 2; US 11 continues east along US 70/SR 1; SR 2 ends as an unsigned secondary highway
1.000 mi = 1.609 km; 1.000 km = 0.621 mi: Concurrency terminus; Incomplete access; Route transition

== See also ==
- List of state routes in Tennessee
