= Tennessee State Route 318 =

State highway in Tennessee, United States

State Route 318
- SR 318 highlighted in red

Route information
- Maintained by TDOT
- Length: 1.1 mi (1.8 km)
- Existed: July 1, 1983–present

Major junctions
- South end: SR 148 near Lookout Mountain
- North end: US 11 / US 41 / US 64 / US 72 in Tiftonia

Location
- Country: United States
- State: Tennessee
- Counties: Hamilton

Highway system
- Tennessee State Routes; Interstate; US; State
← SR 317	→ SR 319

State Route 318 (SR 318) is a short state highway in Hamilton County in the southeastern portion of the U.S. state of Tennessee. It serves as a connector between US 11 / US 41 / US 64 / US 72 and SR 148 and the Lookout Mountain tourist area.

== Route description ==
SR 318 begins in the Tiftonia/Lookout Valley area of West Chattanooga at US 11/US 41/US 64/US 72. It is a narrow, winding mountain road that rises above the U.S. Highways which lie at the base of the mountain. It ends at SR 148 north of the town of Lookout Mountain and the route travels near the eponymous mountain ridge of the same name.

== Major intersections ==
The entire route is in Hamilton County.

Location	mi	km	Destinations	Notes
Lookout Valley	0.0	0.0	US 11 / US 41 / US 64 / US 72 (SR 2/Cummings Highway) – Chattanooga, Jasper, Nashville, Birmingham	Northern terminus
Chattanooga	1.1	1.8	SR 148 (Lookout Mountain Parkway South) – Lookout Mountain, Ruby Falls	Southern Terminus
1.000 mi = 1.609 km; 1.000 km = 0.621 mi
