= U.S. Route 11 in Tennessee =

Highway in Tennessee

U.S. Route 11

Route information
- Maintained by TDOT
- Length: 124.86 mi (200.94 km)
- Existed: November 11, 1926–present

Major junctions
- South end: US 11 / SR 58 at the Georgia state line near Wildwood, GA
- I-24 / US 41 / US 64 / US 72 in Chattanooga; US 41 / US 76 in Chattanooga; SR 153 in Chattanooga; I-75 / US 74 in Ooltewah; US 321 in Lenoir City; US 70 in Dixie Lee Junction; US 129 in Knoxville
- North end: US 11E / US 11W / US 70 in Knoxville

Location
- Country: United States
- State: Tennessee
- Counties: Hamilton, Bradley, McMinn, Monroe, Loudon, Knox

Highway system
- United States Numbered Highway System; List; Special; Divided; Tennessee State Routes; Interstate; US; State
← SR 10	→ US 11E

U.S. Route 11 (US 11) in the U.S. state of Tennessee travels 124.86 miles (200.94 km) in the eastern part of the state. It runs from the Georgia state line in Chattanooga to Knoxville, where it splits into US 11E and 11W. These two highways then travel to the Virginia state line in Bristol, where they rejoin to form US 11 once again. During its length, it shares concurrencies with state routes 1, 2, and 38 as its unsigned companion routes. It is paralleled by Interstate 75 (I-75).

US 11 evolved from a series of Native American trails, including the Great Indian Warpath and the Great Wagon Road, that were extensively used by early settlers. The highway is also part of other historic roads, such as Kingston Pike in the Knoxville area. In the early 20ty century it was part of the Lee Highway, and is still known by this name for much of its length. US 11 was established in 1926 with the United States Numbered Highway System between Chattanooga in Bristol. In 1929, the Tennessee government petitioned federal highway officials to split the northern part of the highway in Tennessee into east and west branches. Since the mid-20th century, some of US 11 has been widened and straightened out. US 11's importance declined after I-75 was completed, but it still maintains its status as a principal arterial route in the cities through which it passes.

== Route description ==
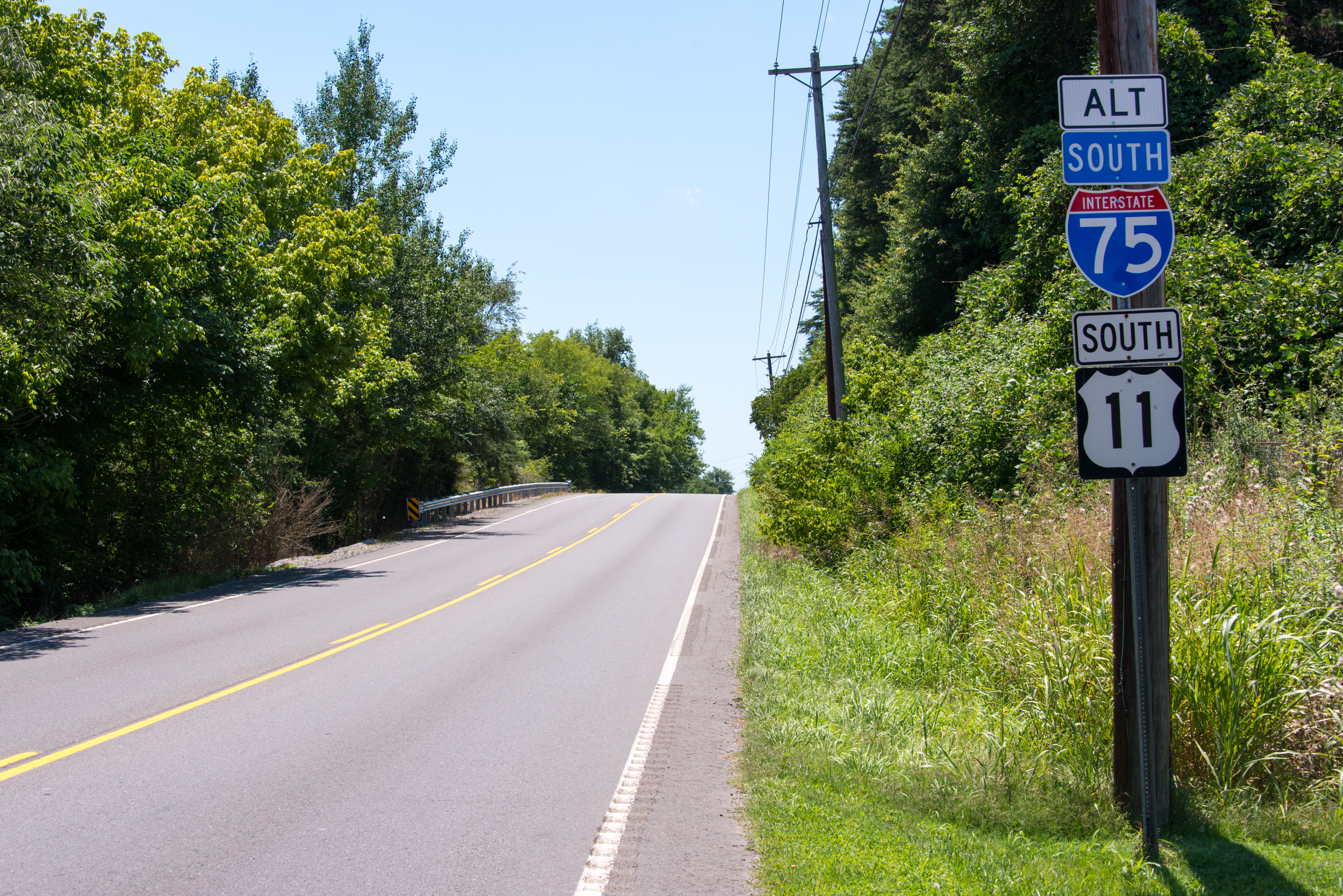
U.S. 11 along Lee Highway, south of Lenoir City

US 11 enters Tennessee west of Chattanooga. The route, concurrent with SR 38 from the state line north, runs parallel to Interstate 24 (I-24) for three miles (4.8 km) to an intersection with Cummings Highway (US 41/US 64/US 72/SR 2). While SR 38 terminates here, US 11 follows the highway east into downtown Chattanooga. At the intersection of Broad and West 20th streets, US 11 and US 64 separate from US 41 and US 72 and follow East 20th Street, which then curves to become East 23rd Street, east through downtown. The routes briefly overlap with US 41, here concurrent to US 76, on Dodds Avenue before resuming an easterly progression on Brainerd Road thereafter called Lee Highway.

East of downtown, I-24 terminates while I-75 continues east along the I-24 right-of-way. U.S. 11 and US 64 continue to the northeast, through northern Chattanooga, and run concurrent with I-75 between exits 7 and 11. SR 317 runs concurrent with I-75 between exits 7 and 9. At exit 11, the route splits, running through Ooltewah and Collegedale before entering Bradley County. The route travels north to Cleveland and comes to an interchange with APD-40 (US 64 Bypass/US 74/SR 311). In downtown Cleveland, US 64 separates from U.S. 11, following SR 40 east out of the city.

U.S. 11 parallels I-75 as it heads north, passing through Athens, where it intersects with SR 30; Sweetwater, where it intersects SR 68; Loudon, where it intersects SR 72; and Lenoir City, where it intersects with US 321/SR 95. The route then forms a concurrency with US 70 (Kingston Pike) at Dixie Lee Junction and enters Knox County passing first through Farragut and then entering West Knoxville. The route comes to an intersection with SR 131 and then I-140 (Pellissippi Parkway). In Downtown Knoxville, the routes intersect with US 129. U.S. 11 and US 70 split east of Knoxville, and split into U.S. 11E and U.S. 11W. U.S. 11W goes through Rutledge, Bean Station, Rogersville, and Kingsport. U.S. 11E goes through Jefferson City, Morristown, Russellville, Greeneville, Jonesborough, Johnson City, where the route forms a concurrency with US 19, and Bristol, before crossing into Virginia.

== History ==
=== Early history and establishment ===
- Cleveland to Charleston Concrete Highway
- U.S. National Register of Historic Places
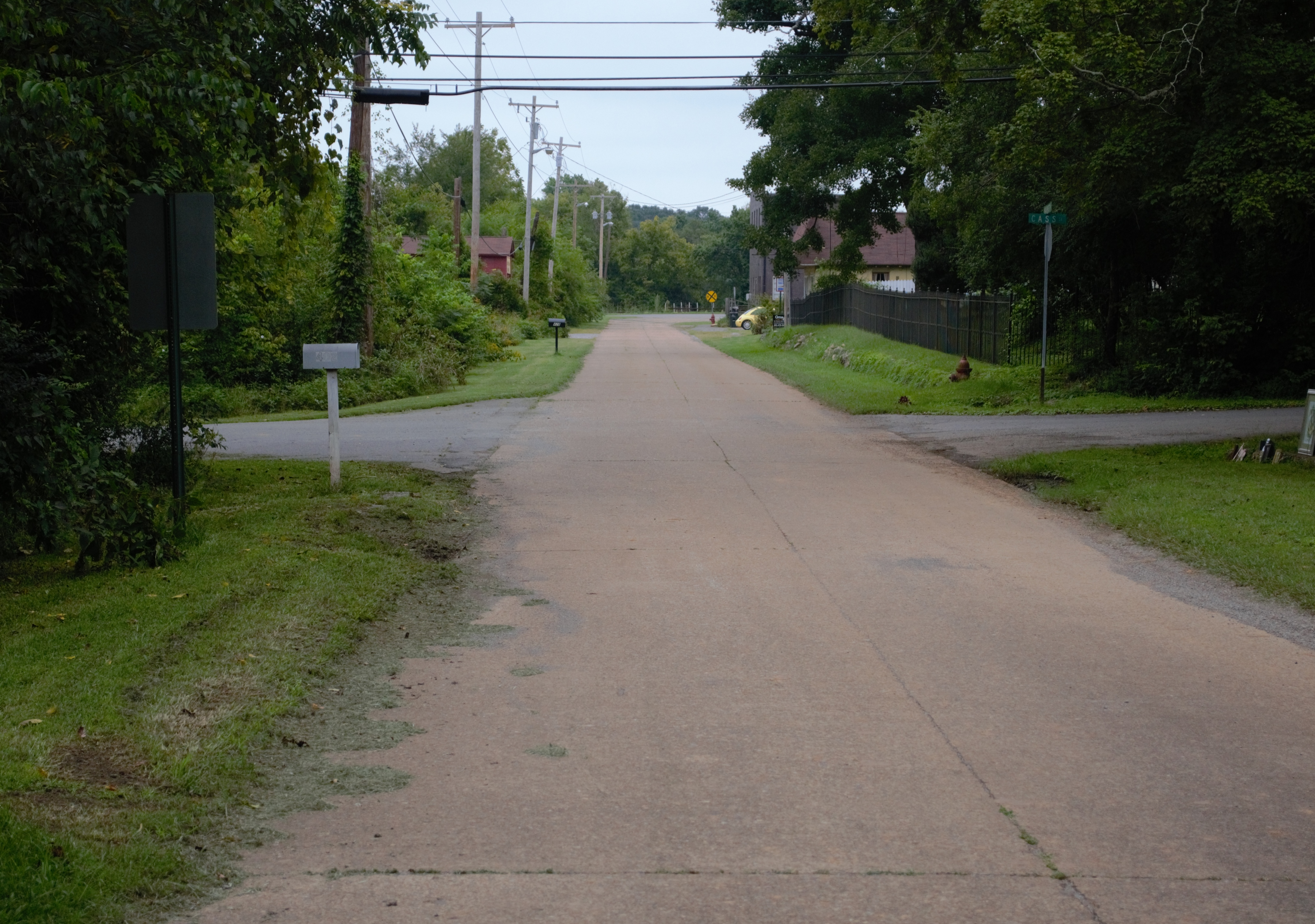
- Original segment of US 11 in Charleston

- Location within Tennessee Location within the United States
- Location: Charleston, Tennessee
- Coordinates: 35°17′14″N 84°45′05″W
- Built: 1925–1927
- NRHP reference No.: 07001382
- Added to NRHP: January 10, 2008

US 11 roughly follows a network of Native American trails in East Tennessee. Some of these trails were considered part of the Great Indian Warpath and the Great Wagon Road, and were extensively used by early explorers and settlers. While the northern part of the present-day US 11 corridor was settled in the late 18th century, the southern portion remained Cherokee lands. The Hiwassee Purchase of 1819 ceded the lands between the Little Tennessee and Hiwassee Rivers to the United States, and the territory south of the Hiwassee remained part of the Cherokee Nation until the Cherokee removal in 1838. In 1866, the road between Knoxville and Kingston became the Kingston turnpike, later known as Kingston Pike.

With the advent of the automobile, the route that US 11 now follows was improved. This included replacing ferries with bridges and the northbound bore of the Missionary Ridge Tunnel in Chattanooga in 1913. In 1915, the part of what is now US 11 concurrency with US 70 between Dixie Lee Junction and Knoxville was established as part of the Dixie Highway, an auto trail. In 1923, another auto trail, the Lee Highway, was established on the road between Chattanooga and Bristol. The junction between these two roads became the namesake for the Dixie Lee Junction community. On October 1, 1923, the Tennessee State Route System was established, and the first numbered state routes in Tennessee were designated. From Chattanooga to Dixie Lee Junction, the road was established as part of SR 2. From here to Bristol, SR 1 was established. The latter segment was also part of the longer Memphis-to-Bristol Highway.

In October 1925, the Joint Board of Interstate Highways finalized its report establishing the new U.S. Highway numbering system, which included US 11 running from Rouses Point, New York to Picayune, Mississippi. In Tennessee, it would follow SR 1 and SR 2 through Bristol, Knoxville, and Chattanooga, and ultimately to the Tennessee–Georgia state line. The American Association of State Highway Officials (AASHO) formally adopted the system on November 11, 1926. At the time, the Bureau of Public Roads reported that nearly the entire length of US 11 was surfaced, with completion expected by 1927.

A development occurred when the state of Tennessee requested that US 11 be split into two branches: US 11W via Kingsport and Rogersville, and US 11E along SR 34 via Johnson City, which had been designated US 511. This was motivated by community advocacy and the prominence of the Lee Highway. AASHO approved this split on June 3, 1929, clearly distinguishing the routes as US 11W and US 11E and truncating US 11 to Knoxville. In 1934, AASHO consolidated the two routes, renumbering US 11E as part of US 411. However, the U.S. numbered system relied on voluntary participation of the states, and Tennessee continued to use the US 11 East/West split. In 1952–53, to reconcile differences between state signage and AASHO’s official logs, the AASHO formally recognized the split: US 11W (the former main route) and US 11E (via Johnson City and Greeneville) remained in use through Tennessee.

=== Cleveland to Charleston Concrete Highway ===
The longest segment of the original concrete U.S. 11 located in Charleston was listed on the National Register of Historic Places (NRHP) on January 10, 2008, as the Cleveland to Charleston Concrete Highway. This segment, built from 1925 to 1927, now consists of Market and Water streets and runs from U.S. 11 to the Hiwassee River where the original bridge was located.

=== Later history ===
After its establishment, much of US 11 was straightened out and widened to handle increasing traffic volumes and eliminate hazards. Around 1940, a new straighter alignment was completed through Charleston and Calhoun west of the old alignment that included the Cleveland to Charleston Concrete Highway. On July 23, 1954, a new four-lane alignment opened between the former Summit community (now part of Collegedale) and Ooltewah near Chattanooga, replacing a section to the east with a hazardous one-lane railroad underpass. This four-lane section was later reused for a section of I-75. In 1956, the southbound bore of the Missionary Ridge Tunnel was completed in Chattanooga. In the late 1950s, a new four-lane alignment was built west of the old route between Riceville and Niota, bypassing downtown Athens to the west. The four-lane US 11 Bypass around downtown Cleveland opened on December 2, 1960, supplanting the old route.

After I-75 was completed in 1974, US 11 ceased to be the major north-south route in the area. Nevertheless, portions of the urban part of the route remain important commercial corridors. The completion of I-40/75 helped induce suburban sprawl and commercial development along the Kingston Pike part of US 11/70 in West Knoxville.

== Major intersections ==
County	Location	mi	km	Destinations	Notes
Hamilton	Lookout Valley	0.0	0.0	US 11 south (Birmingham Pike/SR 58 south) – Trenton	Continuation into Georgia; southern terminus of unsigned SR 38
Hamilton	Lookout Valley	3.0	4.8	US 41 north / US 64 west / US 72 west (Cummings Highway/SR 2) – Jasper	Southern end of US 41/US 64/US 72/SR 2 concurrency; northern terminus of SR 38
Hamilton	Lookout Valley	4.5	7.2	SR 318 south (Old Wauhatchie Pike) – Lookout Mountain	Northern terminus of SR 318
Hamilton	Lookout Valley	6.4	10.3	SR 148 south (Lookout Mountain Parkway) – Lookout Mountain	Northern terminus of SR 148; No access to US 11 south/US 41 north/US 64 west/US 72 west from SR 148
Hamilton	Chattanooga	6.5	10.5	SR 17 (Tennessee Avenue) to SR 58 – Incline, Rock City	Southern end of SR 17 concurrency
Hamilton	Chattanooga	7.9	12.7	US 27 north (I-124/SR 27/SR 29) – Downtown, Red Bank	Northbound exit and southbound entrance
Hamilton	Chattanooga	8.0	12.9	US 41 south / US 72 east / SR 17 west (Broad Street) / SR 58 north (West 20th Street)	Northern end of US 41 / US 72 concurrency; southern end of SR 58 concurrency
Hamilton	Chattanooga	8.3	13.4	SR 58 south (Market Street)	Northern end of SR 58 concurrency
Hamilton	Chattanooga	9.1	14.6	I-24	Direct access only from westbound I-24; I-24 exit 180A
Hamilton	Chattanooga	10.7	17.2	US 41 south / US 76 east (Westside Drive/SR 8) – East Ridge	Southern end of US 41 / US 76 concurrency
Hamilton	Chattanooga	11.2	18.0	US 41 north / US 76 west (East Main Street/SR 8)	Northern end of US 41 / US 76 concurrency
Hamilton	Chattanooga	12.2– 12.4	19.6– 20.0	McCallie Tunnels under Missionary Ridge	
Hamilton	Chattanooga	15.9	25.6	SR 320 east (East Brainerd Road) – East Brainerd	Western terminus of SR 320
Hamilton	Chattanooga	17.6	28.3	SR 153 – Soddy-Daisy, Falling Water	SR 153 exit 1
Hamilton	Chattanooga	20.9	33.6	SR 317 west (Bonny Oaks Drive) – Tyner	Southern end of SR 317 concurrency
Hamilton	Chattanooga	21.2	34.1	I-75 south / US 74 west – Atlanta	Southern end of I-75 / US 74 concurrency; I-75 exit 7
Hamilton	Chattanooga	22.4– 23.0	36.0– 37.0	SR 317 east (Apison Pike) – Ooltewah, Collegedale	Northern end of SR 317 concurrency; I-75 exit 9
Hamilton	Ooltewah	25.1	40.4	I-75 north / US 74 east – Knoxville	Eastern end of I-75 / US 74 concurrency; I-75 exit 11
Hamilton	Ooltewah	25.9	41.7	SR 321 south (Main Street) – Collegedale, East Brainerd	Northern terminus of SR 321
Bradley	Cleveland	35.5– 35.7	57.1– 57.5	US 64 Byp. / US 74 (APD-40/SR 311)	Interchange on US 64 Bypass (APD-40)
Bradley	Cleveland	38.0	61.2	US 11 Byp. north (Keith Street/SR 2)	Southern terminus of US 11 Bypass; northern end of unsigned SR 2 concurrency; southern end of unsigned SR 40 concurrency; western terminus of unsigned SR 40
Bradley	Cleveland	38.7	62.3	US 64 west (W. Inman Street/SR 40/SR 74) / SR 312 east (Harrison Pike)	Western terminus of US 64 concurrency; eastern terminus of SR 312; northern end of unsigned SR 40 concurrency; southern end of unsigned SR 74 concurrency
Bradley	Cleveland	40.2	64.7	SR 60 (25th Street NW/APD-40) to I-75 – Dayton, Dalton	Northern terminus of APD-40 designation
Bradley	Cleveland	41.9	67.4	US 11 Byp. (Keith Street/SR 2) – Athens	Northern terminus of US 11 Bypass and SR 74; southern end of unsigned SR 2 concurrency
Bradley	Cleveland	42.2	67.9	Paul Huff Parkway	Eastern terminus of Paul Huff Parkway
Bradley	Charleston	48.8	78.5	SR 308 west (Lauderdale Memorial Highway) to I-75	Eastern terminus of SR 308
Hiwassee River		50.3 50.4	81.0 81.1	Bridge over the Hiwassee River	
McMinn	Calhoun	50.9	81.9	SR 163 east (Bowater Road) – Downtown Calhoun, Delano	Southern end of SR 163 concurrency
McMinn	Calhoun	51.4	82.7	SR 163 west (Lamonville Road) to I-75	Northern end of SR 163 concurrency
McMinn	Riceville	57.5	92.5	US 11 Bus. north / SR 39 east (Riceville Road) – Downtown Athens, Englewood	Southern end of SR 39 concurrency; southern terminus of US 11 Business
McMinn	Riceville	57.7	92.9	SR 39 west (Riceville Road) to I-75 – Decatur	Northern end of SR 39 concurrency
McMinn	Athens	63.8	102.7	SR 30 (Decatur Pike) – Dayton, Etowah	West to I-75
McMinn	Athens	65.5	105.4	US 11 Bus. (Redfern Drive / North Jackson Street) – Downtown Athens	Northern terminus of US 11 Business
McMinn	Athens	66.5	107.0	SR 305 (Ingleside Avenue) to I-75 – Downtown Athens	West to I-75
McMinn	Niota	70.4	113.3	SR 309 west (Union Grove Road) to I-75	Eastern terminus of SR 309
Monroe	Sweetwater	76.7	123.4	SR 68 (New Highway 68) – Spring City, Madisonville	West to I-75
Monroe	Sweetwater	78.4	126.2	SR 322 (Oakland Road) to I-75 – Vonore	
Loudon	Philadelphia	84.7	136.3	SR 323 west (Pond Creek Road) to I-75	Eastern terminus of SR 323
Loudon	Loudon	88.0	141.6	SR 72 (Loudon Highway) to I-75 – Kingston	
Loudon	Loudon	90.2– 90.7	145.2– 146.0	Congressman John J. Duncan Jr. Loudon County Veterans Memorial Bridge over the Tennessee River	
Loudon	Loudon	92.9	149.5	SR 324 west (Sugar Limb Road) to I-75	Eastern terminus of SR 324
Loudon	Lenoir City	96.7	155.6	US 321 (Lamar Alexander Parkway/SR 73/SR 95) – Oak Ridge, Greenback, Maryville	
Loudon	Dixie Lee Junction	101.8	163.8	US 70 west (Kingston Pike/SR 1) – Kingston	Eastern terminus of SR 2; southern end of US 70/SR 1 concurrency
Knox	Farragut	106.0	170.6	SR 332 east (S Campbell Station Road)	Western terminus of SR 332
Knox	Knoxville	107.7	173.3	SR 131 north (Lovell Road)	Southern terminus of SR 131
Knox	Knoxville	108.8– 109.0	175.1– 175.4	I-140 (Pellissippi Parkway) – Maryville, Oak Ridge	I-140 Exit 1 westbound; Exit 1 A/B eastbound
Knox	Knoxville	115.8	186.4	SR 332 (Northshore Drive)	
Knox	Knoxville	119.3	192.0	Kingston Pike to Cumberland Avenue - Downtown Knoxville	Former routing of US 11/US 70/SR 1 through downtown Knoxville; western end of now unsigned SR 158 (Neyland Drive) concurrency
Knox	Knoxville	119.5– 119.6	192.3– 192.5	US 129 (Alcoa Highway/SR 115) to I-40 / I-75 – Alcoa, Maryville	Interchange
Knox	Knoxville	119.7	192.6	SR 450 east (Joe Johnson Boulevard) – University of Tennessee	Western terminus of SR 450
Knox	Knoxville	121.0	194.7	Lake Loudon Boulevard – University of Tennessee, Thompson-Boling Arena, Neyland Stadium	
Knox	Knoxville	121.8	196.0	Walnut Street – Civic Colesium / Blount Mansion / James White Fort	Intersection with exit to Tennessee Riverboat Landing
Knox	Knoxville	121.9	196.2	Volunteer Landing	Eastbound exit only
Knox	Knoxville	122.1	196.5	SR 158 east (James White Parkway) to I-40	Eastbound exit, westbound entrance; eastern end of now unsigned SR 158 concurrency
Knox	Knoxville	122.2	196.7	SR 71 south (James White Parkway)	Southern end of unsigned SR 71 concurrency; interchange; follows Hall of Fame Drive
Knox	Knoxville	122.5	197.1	W Church Avenue - Knoxville Civic Coliseum, Downtown	
Knox	Knoxville	122.8	197.6	Summit Hill Drive - Downtown	To US 441/SR 62
Knox	Knoxville	123.2	198.3	East 5th Avenue - Downtown; Hall of Fame Drive (SR 71 north)	Northern end of unsigned SR 71 concurrency; East 5th Avenue is the former routing of US 11/US 70/SR 1; follows Magnolia Avenue
Knox	Knoxville	124.86	200.94	US 11W north (Rutledge Pike/SR 1) / US 11E north / US 70 east (Asheville Highway/SR 168)	Route splits into US 11E and US 11W; US 70/SR 1 continues along US 11E; eastern terminus of unsigned SR 168
1.000 mi = 1.609 km; 1.000 km = 0.621 mi: Concurrency terminus; Incomplete access; Route transition

== Cleveland bypass route ==
U.S. Route 11 Bypass
- Keith Street
- Location: Cleveland, Tennessee
- Length: 3.75 mi (6.04 km)
- Existed: 1956–present

U.S. Route 11 Bypass (US 11 Byp.) is a 3.75-mile-long (6.04 km) bypass route around downtown Cleveland, Tennessee, for US 11. It is a four-lane divided highway its entire length, and it is known as Keith Street.

US 11 Byp. begins at an intersection with US 11/US 64 (State Route 2 [SR 2], South Lee Highway) in Cleveland near Bradley Central High School. SR 2 turns north onto US 11 Byp. and runs as a hidden route. US 11/US 64 turns northeast into downtown as 3rd Street. At its terminus, it begins following immediately along South Mouse Creek. About one-third mile (0.54 km) later, the bypass intersects SR 312 (Harrison Pike/Inman Street), a connector to and formerly the route of US 64 about one-half mile (0.80 km) west of downtown. At this intersection, the Cleveland/Bradley County Greenway also begins, following alongside Mouse Creek. The route continues north through a historic residential district. Further along, US 11 Byp. comes to an intersection with SR 60 (25th Street). The route then enters a primarily commercial district, passing the corporate headquarters of Life Care Centers of America, and turns northeast, crossing Mouse Creek and the greenway. The route crosses Mouse Creek Ridge, passing through commercial areas and coming to an intersection with Woodcrest Avenue/Ocoee Crossing, a connector to US 11 (Ocoee Street). About one-half mile (0.80 km) later, the bypass comes to an end at an intersection with US 11 (Ocoee Street).

Originally, the route's state designation was SR 2 Byp., and SR 2 remained on the bypassed portion of US 11. In 1983, when TDOT modified their highway numbering system, SR 2 was rerouted onto Keith Street. The section of US 11 between the southern terminus of Keith Street and the intersection with US 64 became part of SR 40 (which continues on US 64 into North Carolina, and the section between US 64 and Keith Street's northern terminus became part of SR 74.

Major intersections
The entire route is in Cleveland, Bradley County.

mi	km	Destinations	Notes
0.00	0.00	US 11 / US 64 (South Lee Highway/SR 2 west/SR 40 east) – Ooltewah, Downtown	Southern terminus; southern end of unsigned SR 2 concurrency
0.35	0.56	SR 312 west (Harrison Pike / W. Inman Street) – Downtown, Birchwood	
2.05	3.30	SR 60 (25th Street NW) to I-75 – Dayton, Dalton	Connector to APD-40
3.75	6.04	US 11 (Ocoee Street/SR 74 south/North Lee Highway/SR 2 east) – Downtown, Athens	Northern terminus of US 11 Bypass and unsigned SR 74; northern end of unsigned SR 2 concurrency
1.000 mi = 1.609 km; 1.000 km = 0.621 mi: Concurrency terminus

== Riceville–Athens business loop ==
U.S. Route 11 Business
- Location: Riceville–Athens, Tennessee
- Length: 9.7 mi (15.6 km)

U.S. Route 11 Business (US 11 Bus.) is a business route of US 11 that runs from Riceville to Athens, Tennessee. It runs along SR 39 in Riceville until it reaches downtown Athens where it becomes a one-way pair just before the intersection with Woodman Street. From there, US 11 Bus./SR 39 runs north and eastbound on Madison Avenue, while the southbound routes runs along Washington Street. At the McMinn County Courthouse, the routes turn onto a second one way pair specifically northbound along Jackson Street and southbound along White Street. The one-way pair ends as the routes merge into Jackson Street at Tennessee Wesleyan University between College Street and Coach Farmer Drive. On the verge of departing downtown, the road has one major intersection with SR 30 (Decatur Pike westbound and Green Street eastbound), then runs along the hills of the suburbanized landscape of the outskirts of the city. At an abandoned factory near a railroad line, Jackson Street ends as it makes a sharp turn west onto Redfern Drive and then crosses a railroad crossing before finally terminating at US 11.

Major Intersections
The entire route is in McMinn County.

Location	mi	km	Destinations	Notes
Riceville	0.0	0.0	US 11 / SR 39 west (Lee Highway/SR 2) – Calhoun, Charleston, Athens	Southern terminus; southern end of SR 39 concurrency
Athens	7.5	12.1	SR 39 east (East Washington Avenue/East Madison Avenue (one-way pair))	Northern end of SR 39 concurrency
Athens	8.0	12.9	SR 30 (Decatur Pike/Green Street) to I-75 – Decatur, Etowah	
Athens	9.7	15.6	US 11 (Congress Parkway/SR 2) – Sweetwater, Niota, Riceville, Calhoun	Northern terminus
1.000 mi = 1.609 km; 1.000 km = 0.621 mi: Concurrency terminus

== See also ==
- Special routes of U.S. Route 11

U.S. Route 11
Previous state: Georgia	Tennessee	Next state: Virginia
