= Tennessee State Route 38 =

State highway in Tennessee, United States

State Route 38

Route information
- Maintained by TDOT
- Length: 2.96 mi (4.76 km)
- Existed: October 1, 1923–present

Major junctions
- South end: US 11 / SR 58 at the Georgia state line near Wildwood, GA
- North end: US 11 / US 41 / US 64 / US 72 in Chattanooga

Location
- Country: United States
- State: Tennessee
- Counties: Hamilton

Highway system
- Tennessee State Routes; Interstate; US; State
← SR 37	→ SR 39

State Route 38 (SR 38) is a north–south highway located entirely in Hamilton County in southern East Tennessee. The 2.96-mile-long (4.76 km) highway runs concurrently with U.S. Route 11 (US 11) for its entire length from the Georgia state line to the US 41/US 64/US 72 (SR 2) in west Chattanooga.

== Major intersections ==
The entire route is in Hamilton County.

Location	mi	km	Destinations	Notes
	0.0	0.0	US 11 south (Birmingham Pike/SR 58 south) – Wildwood, Trenton	Southern terminus; Georgia state line; southern end of US 11 concurrency
Chattanooga	2.96	4.76	US 11 north / US 41 / US 64 / US 72 (SR 2) to I-24 – Haletown, Chattanooga	Northern terminus; US 11 continues north along US 41/US 64/US 72/SR 2
1.000 mi = 1.609 km; 1.000 km = 0.621 mi: Concurrency terminus

== See also ==
- U.S. Route 11 in Tennessee
