= Tennessee State Route 323 =

State highway in Tennessee, United States

State Route 323
- Pond Creek Road
- SR 323 highlighted in red

Route information
- Maintained by TDOT
- Length: 2.2 mi (3.5 km)
- Existed: July 1, 1983–present

Major junctions
- West end: I-75 near Philadelphia
- East end: US 11 in Philadelphia

Location
- Country: United States
- State: Tennessee
- Counties: Loudon

Highway system
- Tennessee State Routes; Interstate; US; State
← SR 322	→ SR 324

State Route 323 (SR 323), also known as Pond Creek Road, is a short 2.2-mile-long (3.5 km) east–west state highway in Loudon County, Tennessee. It serves as the primary access road from Interstate 75 (I-75) at exit 68 to the town of Philadelphia, at U.S. Route 11 (US 11).

== Route description ==
SR 323 begins at an interchange with I-75 at exit 68. It goes east as a two-lane undivided highway through farmland with a speed limit of 50 miles per hour (80 km/h). The highway then enters Philadelphia and crosses over Norfolk Southern's Knoxville District West End railroad line before coming to an end at an intersection with US 11 (Lee Highway and its unsigned designation of SR 2).

== Major intersections ==
The entire route is in Loudon County.

Location	mi	km	Destinations	Notes
	0.0	0.0	I-75 – Chattanooga, Knoxville	I-75 exit 68; western terminus; road continues west as Pond Creek Road
Philadelphia	2.2	3.5	US 11 (Lee Highway/SR 2) – Sweetwater, Loudon	Eastern terminus
1.000 mi = 1.609 km; 1.000 km = 0.621 mi
