= Tennessee State Route 148 =

State highway in Tennessee, United States

State Route 148
- Lookout Mountain Parkway
- SR 148 highlighted in red

Route information
- Maintained by TDOT
- Length: 4 mi (6.4 km)

Major junctions
- South end: SR 189 at Georgia state line in Lookout Mountain
- North end: US 11 / US 41 / US 64 / US 72 in West Chattanooga

Location
- Country: United States
- State: Tennessee
- Counties: Hamilton

Highway system
- Tennessee State Routes; Interstate; US; State
← SR 147	→ SR 149

State Route 148 (SR 148) is a state highway in Hamilton County in southeastern portion of the U.S. state of Tennessee.

== Route description ==
SR 148 begins at Georgia State Route 189 at the Tennessee-Georgia border in both Lookout Mountain, Tennessee and Lookout Mountain, Georgia. It proceeds northeast to a four-way intersection where SR 148 turns northward and continues northward to Downtown Lookout Mountain, Tennessee, where SR 148 turns eastward and leaves the Town limits of Lookout Mountain. It then turns back north and climbs up the mountain ridge and enters Chattanooga city limits. SR 148 then passes Ruby Falls and comes to a three way T-intersection, SR 318 goes west and SR 148 turns back eastward and comes to an end at an intersection with US 11/US 41/US 64/US 72.

== Junction list ==
The entire route is in Hamilton County.

Location	mi	km	Destinations	Notes
Lookout Mountain	0.0	0.0	SR 189 (Lookout Mountain Scenic Highway) – Lookout Mountain, Covenant College, Trenton	Southern terminus; Georgia state line
Chattanooga	3.7	6.0	SR 318 north (Old Wauhatchie Pike) to I-24 – Birmingham, Jasper, Nashville	Southern terminus of SR 318
Chattanooga	4.0	6.4	US 11 north / US 41 south / US 64 east / US 72 east (SR 2 / Cummings Highway) – Chattanooga	Northern terminus; No access to US 11 south, US 41 north and US 64/US 72 west
1.000 mi = 1.609 km; 1.000 km = 0.621 mi: Incomplete access
