= Tennessee State Route 309 =

Public roadway in Tennessee

State Route 309
- Union Grove Road
- SR 309 highlighted in red

Route information
- Maintained by TDOT
- Length: 2.6 mi (4.2 km)
- Existed: July 1, 1983–present

Major junctions
- West end: I-75 near Niota
- East end: US 11 in Niota

Location
- Country: United States
- State: Tennessee
- Counties: McMinn

Highway system
- Tennessee State Routes; Interstate; US; State
← SR 308	→ SR 310

State Route 309 (SR 309), also known as Union Grove Road, is a 2.6-mile-long (4.2 km) east–west state highway in McMinn County, Tennessee. It serves as the primary access road from Interstate 75 (I-75, Exit 56) to the town of Niota.

== Route description ==
SR 309 begins at an interchange with I-75 (Exit 56). It heads east past a few roadside businesses before passing through farmland as a two-lane highway. It then enters Niota and comes to an end at an intersection with U.S. Route 11 (US 11, Willson Street/SR 2) on the north side of town.

== Major intersections ==
The entire route is in McMinn County.

Location	mi	km	Destinations	Notes
	0.0	0.0	I-75 – Chattanooga, Knoxville	I-75 exit 56; western terminus
Niota	2.6	4.2	US 11 (Willson Street/SR 2) – Athens, Sweetwater	Eastern terminus
1.000 mi = 1.609 km; 1.000 km = 0.621 mi
