= Georgia State Route 189 =

State highway in Georgia, United States

State Route 189
- Lookout Mountain Scenic Highway
- SR 189 highlighted in red

Route information
- Maintained by GDOT
- Length: 15.7 mi (25.3 km)

Major junctions
- South end: SR 136 southeast of Trenton
- South end: SR 148 at the Tennessee state line at Lookout Mountain, Tennessee

Location
- Country: United States
- State: Georgia
- Counties: Dade, Walker

Highway system
- Georgia State Highway System; Interstate; US; State; Special
← SR 188	→ SR 190

State Route 189 (SR 189) is a 15.7-mile-long (25.3 km) state highway that runs south-to-north through portions of Dade and Walker counties in the northwestern part of the U.S. state of Georgia.

== Route description ==
SR 189 begins at an intersection with SR 136 southeast of Trenton, in Dade County. It heads northeast through part of Cloudland Canyon State Park and has a small wobble into Walker County before going back into Dade County. It heads northwest and curves to the northeast until it meets SR 157 (Hinkle Road). The two routes run concurrent to the northeast. On the southwestern edge of Lookout Mountain, they cut across the eastern edge of Covenant College. They briefly run along the Dade–Walker county line, with SR 157 splitting off onto McFarland Road, before SR 189 crosses back into Dade County. The road enters Walker County for the last time until it meets its northern terminus, a connection with Tennessee State Route 148 at the Tennessee state line on the Lookout Mountain, Georgia–Lookout Mountain, Tennessee city line. SR 189 is not part of the National Highway System.

== Major intersections ==
County	Location	mi	km	Destinations	Notes
Dade		0.0	0.0	SR 136 – Trenton, LaFayette	Southern terminus
Walker	No major junctions				
Dade		11.1	17.9	SR 157 south (Hinkle Road)	Southern end of SR 157 concurrency
Dade–Walker county line	Lookout Mountain	14.9	24.0	SR 157 north (McFarland Road)	Northern end of SR 157 concurrency
Walker	No major junctions				
Tennessee state line		15.7	25.3	Northern terminus; roadway continues as SR 148 north – Lookout Mountain.	
1.000 mi = 1.609 km; 1.000 km = 0.621 mi: Concurrency terminus
