= Calhoun, Tennessee =

- Town
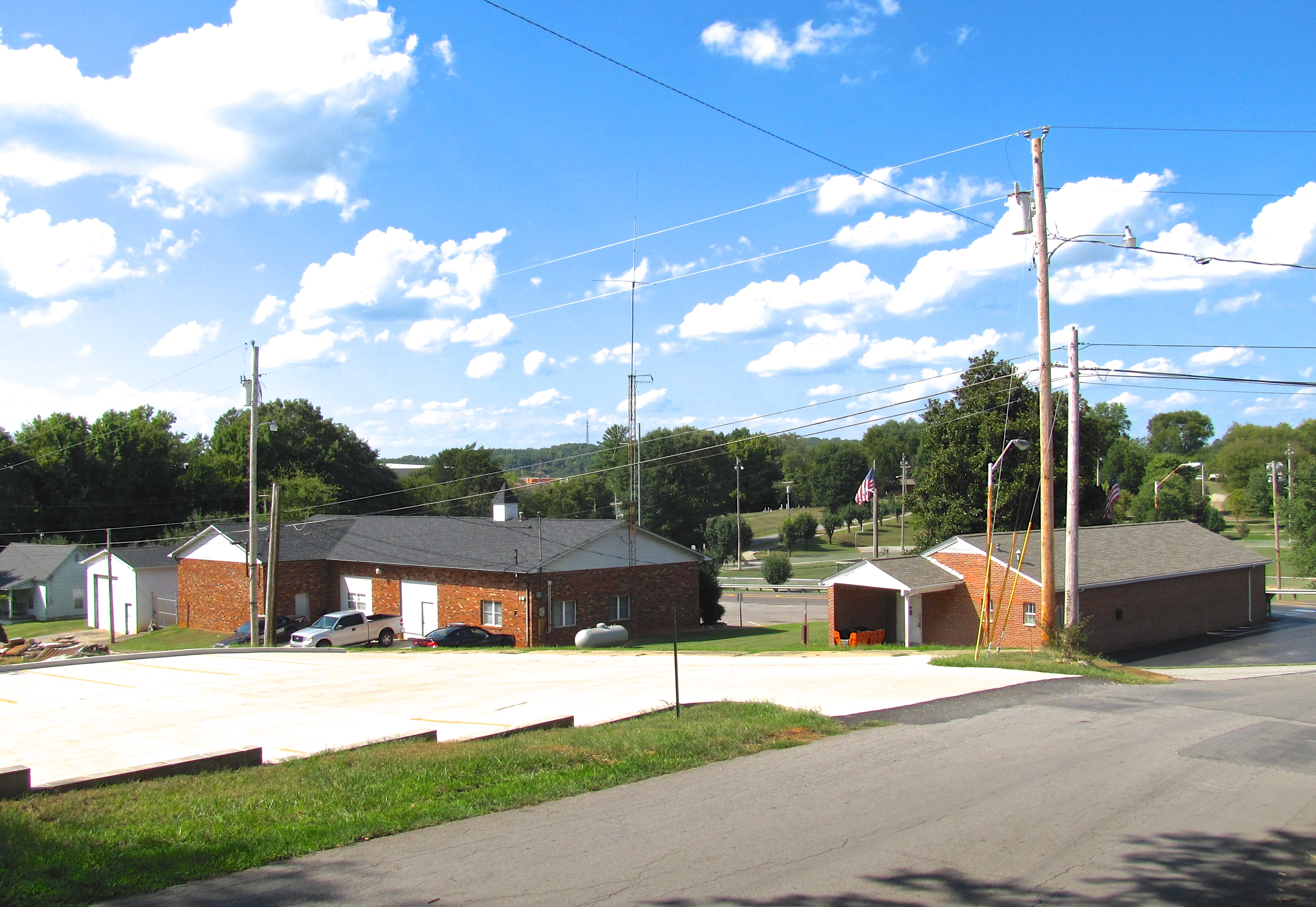

- Location of Calhoun in McMinn County, Tennessee.
- Coordinates: 35°17′45″N 84°44′53″W
- Country: United States
- State: Tennessee
- County: McMinn
- Founded: 1820
- Incorporated: 1961
- Named for: John C. Calhoun

Area
  - Total: 1.25 sq mi (3.23 km^{2})
  - Land: 1.19 sq mi (3.08 km^{2})
  - Water: 0.058 sq mi (0.15 km^{2})
- Elevation: 712 ft (217 m)

Population (2020)
  - Total: 536
  - Density: 451.4/sq mi (174.29/km^{2})
- Time zone: UTC-5 (Eastern (EST))
  - Summer (DST): UTC-4 (EDT)
- ZIP code: 37309
- Area code: 423
- FIPS code: 47-10440
- GNIS feature ID: 1279325

Calhoun is a town in McMinn County, Tennessee, United States. It is part of the Athens Micropolitan Statistical Area . The population was estimated at 536 in 2020.

== History ==
The area where Calhoun is located was settled by John Walker (c. 1770-1834), a part-Cherokee grandson of Nancy Ward and a prominent figure in the formation of McMinn County. Walker helped contract the Cherokee Turnpike Company in 1808 to maintain a road between Knoxville and Georgia. What is now Calhoun began around 1808, when Walker established a ferry across the Hiwassee River between the present locations of Calhoun and Charleston. In 1819, Walker helped negotiate the Calhoun Treaty, where the Cherokee ceded the remaining lands between the Hiwassee River and the Little Tennessee River to the U.S. government. That same year McMinn County was organized at Walker's home in Calhoun. In 1820, Walker laid out the town of Calhoun, which he named for John C. Calhoun, the Calhoun Treaty's chief U.S. negotiator. Walker's son, John "Jack" Walker Jr., would eventually be assassinated by two anti-removal Cherokees, who felt he had betrayed the Cherokee Nation.

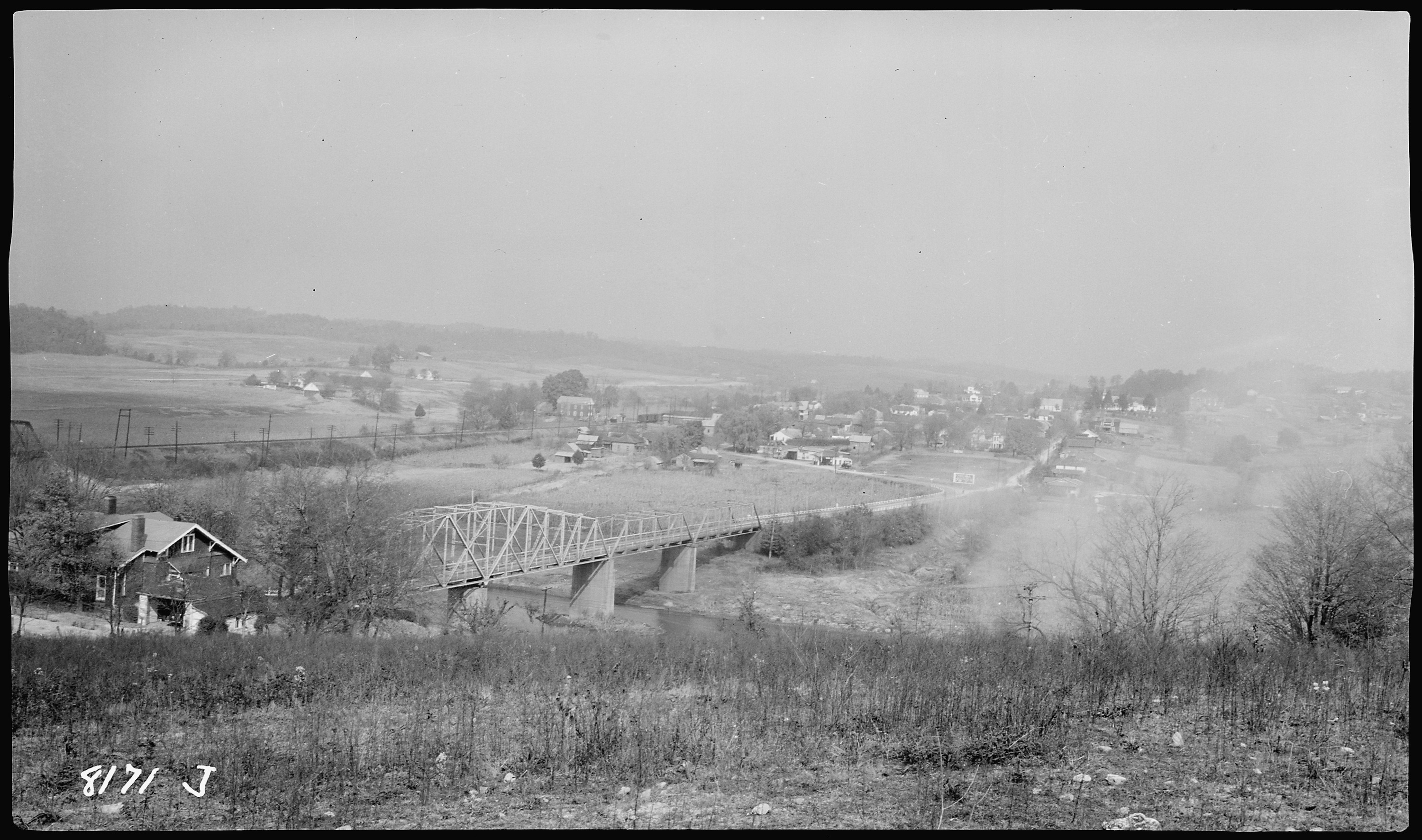
Calhoun in 1939

Joseph McMinn, governor of Tennessee from 1815 to 1821, spent the last few years of his life in Calhoun, and is buried in the Shiloh Presbyterian Cemetery, which is located in Calhoun.

In 1954, the pulp and paper giant Bowater (now Resolute Forest Products) established a plant in Calhoun that soon grew to become one of the largest newsprint mills in North America. The mill, which dominates the western half of Calhoun, used to produce 750,000 metric tons of newsprint and specialty paper per year. Currently it only makes tissue paper and the pulp wood division is being dismantled for scrap.

There is one government building in the city which functions as the town's library, courthouse, police station, and fire station. Directly across the road from this building is a baseball field where Little League games are held.

Calhoun had its own high school that shut down in 1980. They had some very successful baseball teams. They also had basketball teams. Their cross river rivals were the Charleston panthers who also later closed their high school in 2001.

On December 11, 1990, a heavy fog led to a crash involving 99 vehicles along Interstate 75 near Calhoun, killing 12 and injuring 42. As a result, electronic speed limit signs equipped with fog sensors have been installed along the Calhoun section of the interstate.

== Geography ==
Calhoun is situated along the north bank of the Hiwassee River, which flows from the Appalachian Mountains to the east and empties into the Chickamauga Lake impoundment of the Tennessee River a few miles to the west. The river forms the boundary between McMinn County and Bradley County. The town of Charleston is located across the river to the south, on the Bradley County side.

Calhoun is situated around the junction of U.S. Route 11, which connects the town to Athens to the north and Charleston and Cleveland to the south, and State Route 163 (Bowater Road), which connects Calhoun to U.S. Route 411 in Delano to the east and Interstate 75 (Exit 36) to the west.

According to the United States Census Bureau, the town has a total area of 1.1 square miles (2.8 km^{2}), of which 1.0 square mile (2.6 km^{2}) is land and 0.1 square miles (0.26 km^{2}) (4.67%) is water.

== Demographics ==
Historical population
Census	Pop.	Note	%±
1870	232		—
1880	203		−12.5%
1890	222		9.4%
1970	624		—
1980	590		−5.4%
1990	552		−6.4%
2000	496		−10.1%
2010	490		−1.2%
2020	536		9.4%

=== 2020 census ===
Calhoun racial composition
Race	Number	Percentage
White (non-Hispanic)	476	88.81%
Black or African American (non-Hispanic)	12	2.24%
Other/Mixed	34	6.34%
Hispanic or Latino	14	2.61%

As of the 2020 United States census, there were 536 people, 230 households, and 144 families residing in the town.

=== 2000 census ===
As of the census of 2000, there were 496 people, 205 households, and 148 families residing in the town. The population density was 486.4 inhabitants per square mile (187.8/km^{2}). There were 225 housing units at an average density of 220.6 per square mile (85.2/km^{2}). The racial makeup of the town was 97.78% White, 0.81% African American, 1.01% Asian, and 0.40% from two or more races. Hispanic or Latino of any race were 3.43% of the population.

There were 205 households, out of which 28.3% had children under the age of 18 living with them, 60.0% were married couples living together, 7.8% had a female householder with no husband present, and 27.8% were non-families. 25.9% of all households were made up of individuals, and 10.7% had someone living alone who was 65 years of age or older. The average household size was 2.42 and the average family size was 2.86.

In the town, the population was spread out, with 22.6% under the age of 18, 6.0% from 18 to 24, 25.2% from 25 to 44, 29.2% from 45 to 64, and 16.9% who were 65 years of age or older. The median age was 41 years. For every 100 females, there were 101.6 males. For every 100 females age 18 and over, there were 93.9 males.

The median income for a household in the town was $38,438, and the median income for a family was $44,688. Males had a median income of $36,563 versus $20,333 for females. The per capita income for the town was $19,984. About 5.3% of families and 10.2% of the population were below the poverty line, including 3.5% of those under age 18 and 9.5% of those age 65 or over.

== Education ==
McMinn County Schools operates public schools, including Calhoun Elementary School. Calhoun had its own high school that shut down in 1980
