= Tennessee State Route 324 =

Highway in Loudon County, Tennessee

State Route 324
- Sugar Limb Road
- SR 324 highlighted in red

Route information
- Maintained by TDOT
- Length: 2.3 mi (3.7 km)
- Existed: July 1, 1983–present

Major junctions
- West end: I-75 near Loudon
- East end: US 11 in Loudon

Location
- Country: United States
- State: Tennessee
- Counties: Loudon

Highway system
- Tennessee State Routes; Interstate; US; State
← SR 323	→ SR 325

State Route 324 (SR 324), also known as Sugar Limb Road, is a short state highway in Loudon County, Tennessee. It serves as one of two roads connecting the city of Loudon with Interstate 75 (I-75); the other is SR 72.

== Route description ==
SR 324 begins at an interchange with I-75 at exit 76. It travels southeasterly through rural hilly terrain along the banks of the Tennessee River. The highway then enters the Loudon city limits and passes through industrial areas before coming to an end at an intersection with U.S. Route 11 (US 11, Lee Highway/SR 2) north of downtown. The entire route of SR 324 is a two-lane highway.

== Major intersections ==
The entire route is in Loudon County.

Location	mi	km	Destinations	Notes
	0.0	0.0	I-75 – Chattanooga, Knoxville	I-75 exit 76; western terminus
Loudon	2.3	3.7	US 11 (Lee Highway/SR 2) – Loudon, Lenoir City	Eastern terminus
1.000 mi = 1.609 km; 1.000 km = 0.621 mi
