= Interstate 75 in Tennessee =

Highway in Tennessee

Interstate 75
- I-75 highlighted in red

Route information
- Maintained by TDOT
- Length: 161.86 mi (260.49 km)
- Existed: August 14, 1957–present
- History: Completed December 20, 1974
- Tourist routes: Cumberland Historic Byway
- NHS: Entire route

Major junctions
- South end: I-75 at the Georgia state line in East Ridge
- I-24 on the East Ridge–Chattanooga line; SR 153 in Chattanooga; I-40 near Lenoir City; I-140 in Knoxville; I-40 in Knoxville; I-275 / I-640 in Knoxville
- North end: I-75 at the Kentucky state line in Jellico

Location
- Country: United States
- State: Tennessee
- Counties: Hamilton, Bradley, McMinn, Monroe, Loudon, Knox, Anderson, Campbell

Highway system
- Interstate Highway System; Main; Auxiliary; Suffixed; Business; Future; Tennessee State Routes; Interstate; US; State
← SR 74	→ SR 75

Interstate 75 (I-75) in the US state of Tennessee runs in the eastern part of the state, from Chattanooga to Jellico by way of Knoxville. I-75 enters the Tennessee from Georgia, following the Tennessee Valley all the way through Knoxville to near Rocky Top. It then climbs into the Cumberland Mountains, where it reaches its highest elevation, before crossing over into Kentucky at Jellico.

Of the six states that I-75 traverses, the segment in Tennessee is the shortest, at 161.86 miles (260.49 km). It has one auxiliary route, I-275 in Knoxville, which was originally part of I-75 until 1980. Between Chattanooga and Knoxville, I-75 follows the route of U.S. Route 11 (US 11), and, from Knoxville into Kentucky, it follows the route of US 25W. Beginning in Chattanooga, I-75 follows the route of US 41 for the rest of the length to its southern terminus in Miami, Florida.

The first sections of I-75 in Tennessee reused short highways that predated the Interstate system, and the Interstate was completed in 1974. A segment of the highway is notoriously prone to dense fog, and was the site of one of the largest multi-vehicle collisions in United States history. While the Interstate has seen expansion projects since its initial construction, most of I-75 in Tennessee remains two lanes in each direction, unlike in other states it passes through.

== Route description ==
I-75 is maintained by the Tennessee Department of Transportation (TDOT), along with all Interstate, U.S., and state highways in Tennessee. The busiest stretch of highway in Tennessee is usually on the segment concurrent with I-40 in Knoxville between Papermill Road and I-640, which had an average daily traffic volume of 187,191 vehicles in 2025, down from a peak of 218,583 vehicles nearby in 2022. (Note: While this section usually ranks as the busiest in Tennessee, in 2025 it was narrowly surpassed by a section of I-24/I-65 in Nashville.) The lowest volume that year was 28,628 vehicles in rural Campbell County. The busiest weigh station in the country is on I-40/I-75 in Farragut, a suburb of Knoxville, which serves more than 2.4 million trucks annually. Unlike most states that I-75 passes through, most of the Tennessee portion is still two lanes in each direction.

=== Chattanooga ===
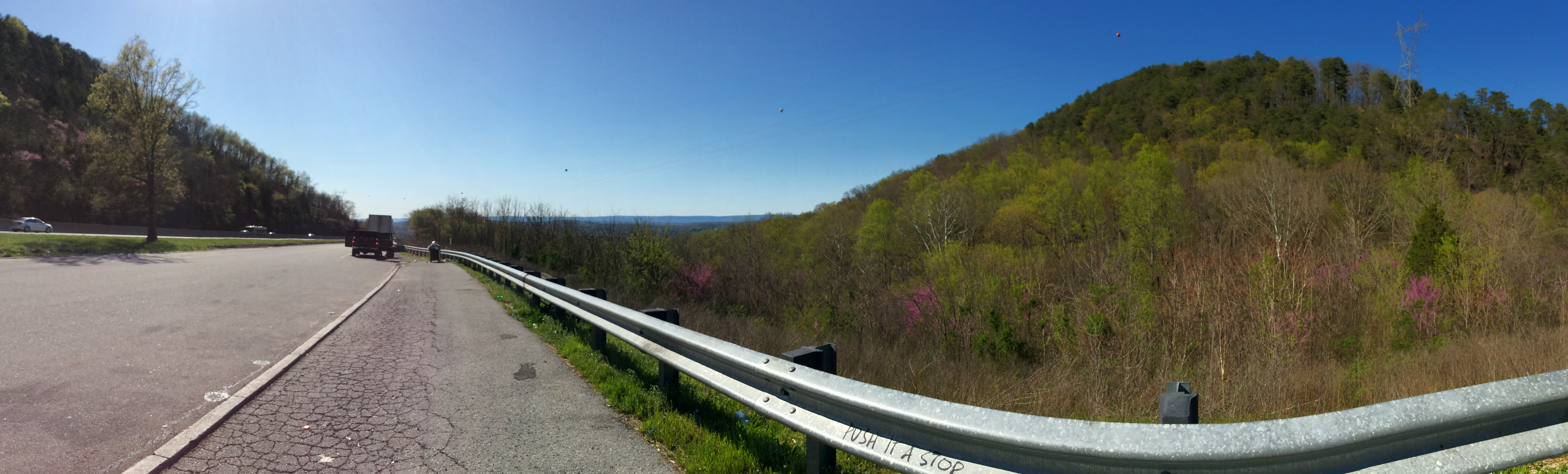
Scenic view along I-75 southbound crossing White Oak Mountain

I-75 enters Tennessee on the eastern side of East Ridge, a southern suburb of Chattanooga. Less than 1/2 mile (0.80 km) into Tennessee is an interchange with US 41 and US 76, the latter of which is unsigned. About a mile (1.6 km) later, at exit 2, is a three-way interchange with the eastern terminus of I-24, which runs west into downtown Chattanooga, then to northwest towards Nashville while connecting to the northern terminus of I-59 near Wildwood, Georgia that goes southwest toward Birmingham, Alabama. At this interchange, I-75 turns northeast, running along the eastern boundary of Chattanooga. Almost two miles (3.2 km) later is an interchange with State Route 320 (SR 320), which connects to East Brainerd, and, about a half mile (0.80 km) later is a three-way interchange with the southern terminus of SR 153, a controlled-access highway that runs northwest to the Chattanooga Metropolitan Airport and crosses the Tennessee River on the Chickamauga Dam. Accessible from the northbound lanes at this interchange is Hamilton Place Boulevard, a connector to Hamilton Place. The southbound lanes of I-75 are also accessible from an entrance ramp from this road. At this point, I-75 enters a large commercial area dominated by Hamilton Place and has an interchange with Shallowford Road about a mile (1.6 km) later. A few miles later, at exit 7, I-75 has an interchange with US 11 southbound, US 64 westbound, and SR 317 westbound and begins a concurrency with these respective routes. Turning slightly northeast, the Interstate crosses a Norfolk Southern Railway, and, at exit 9, SR 317 splits off to the east. I-75 then crosses a steep ridge, passing between the Enterprise South Industrial Park to the west and Collegedale to the east. A few miles later, in Ooltewah, US 11/US 64 split off at exit 11, where the route narrows to six lanes. I-75 then turns northwest and narrows to four lanes.

=== Bradley to Loudon counties ===
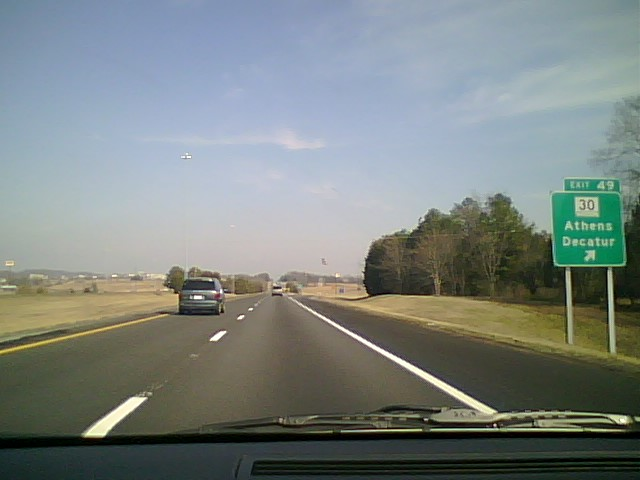
I-75 northbound in Athens

A few miles later, I-75 begins a steep ascent up the western slope of White Oak Mountain, where the northbound lanes receive a truck climbing lane. At this point, the Interstate turns northeast and, for the next three miles (4.8 km), traverses east northeast over the top of White Oak Mountain, where it crosses into Bradley County. I-75 then runs for the next several miles through a predominantly wooded and agricultural area and crossing a few ridges before reaching Cleveland at an interchange with APD-40 eastbound (US 64 Bypass [US 64 Byp.]), a bypass and connector to US 64. Running along the western edge of Cleveland, I-75 has an interchange with SR 60 about 4.5 miles (7.2 km) later, also crossing Candies Creek Ridge at this location, and, less than two miles (3.2 km) later, an interchange with Paul Huff Parkway, a major thoroughfare along the northern part of Cleveland. The Interstate then leaves Cleveland and enters rural northern Bradley County, running northeast. Beginning at this point and continuing for nearly 60 miles (97 km), I-75 is very straight and flat, with few curves. Nearly the entirety of this section also contains an extremely wide median, mostly separated by trees. In some locations, the north and southbound lanes are as much as a half mile (0.80 km) apart.

About 12 miles (19 km) north of the central business district of Cleveland, I-75 curves to the northeast, crosses the Hiwassee River into McMinn County, and then curves back to the northwest. This area is extremely susceptible to fog hazards, which obscures the visibility of drivers, and several bad accidents have occurred on this section as a result. Running through mostly wooded and agricultural areas, I-75 reaches Athens about 15 miles (24 km) later and has an interchange with SR 30, a major east–west corridor in East Tennessee. Running through northern McMinn County, the Interstate passes near several unincorporated communities and has interchanges with several secondary state highways. Around milemarker 58, I-75 enters Monroe County and, a few miles later, passes near the town of Sweetwater, containing an interchange with SR 68, another major primary state highway. A few miles later, I-75 crosses into Loudon County. At exit 72 is an interchange with SR 72, which connects to Loudon, and, a few miles later, the highway crosses the Tennessee River on the Mitchell W. Stout Memorial Bridges. I-75 then enters a predominantly commercial and residential area and has an interchange with US 321 and SR 95 in Lenoir City. These routes also connect to Oak Ridge and Maryville. Curving slightly to the west and then again to the east, I-75 reaches an interchange with I-40 westbound about three miles (4.8 km) later, where it begins a concurrency with I-40, and the combined routes widen to six lanes. Less than one mile (1.6 km) later, about 20 miles (32 km) west southwest of Knoxville, the concurrent routes cross into Knox County.

=== Knoxville ===
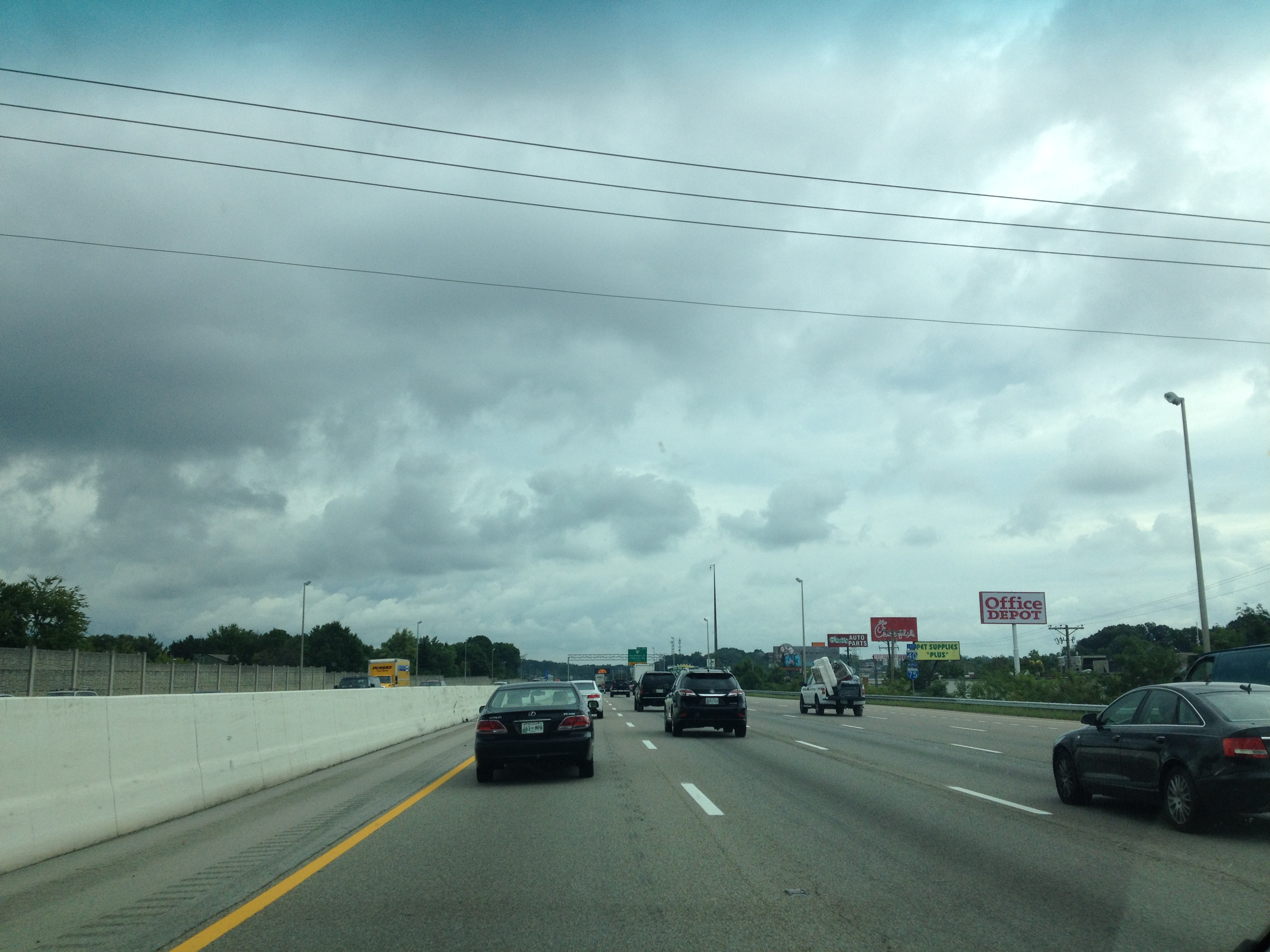
I-75 north, along its concurrency with I-40 east in Knoxville

Running approximately east-northeast, the two Interstates pass through the western suburbs of Knoxville, including Farragut and West Knoxville. Along this concurrency, exits are numbered according to I-40 mileage. At exit 374 is an interchange with SR 131 (Lovell Road), where the highway widens to eight lanes, and, less than two miles (3.2 km) later is a four-way interchange with the Pellissippi Parkway (SR 162 westbound, I-140 eastbound), which connects to Oak Ridge to the west and Maryville to the east. At exit 380 is an interchange with US 11/US 70 (Kingston Pike), which connects to the West Hills neighborhood and West Town Mall. This section is the most heavily traveled section of highway in Tennessee, with an annual average daily traffic (AADT) volume of more than 210,000 vehicles. About five miles (8.0 km) later, at an interchange with the western terminus of I-640, the northern bypass around Downtown Knoxville, I-75 splits north off of I-40 and onto a concurrency with I-640. Along this concurrency, exits are numbered according to I-640 mileage. Heading north, the Interstates come to an interchange with SR 62 (Western Avenue) about one mile (1.6 km) later. About 1.5 miles (2.4 km) later is a complicated interchange with I-275 southbound, the former route of I-75, and US 25W, where I-75 splits off and turns northwest.

=== Clinch River Valley and Cumberland Mountains ===
Leaving Knoxville, I-75 runs north northwest, crossing several paralleling ridges of the Ridge-and-Valley Appalachians. The terrain for the next 20 miles (32 km) of I-75 north of Knoxville is characterized mostly by a slight downhill grade. At exit 112 in Powell, I-75 once again has an interchange with SR 131, and the Interstate narrows from six to four lanes. Entering a rural area, I-75 runs along a creek valley for the next several miles that bisects several ridges in a crooked and hazardous segment marked by several S-curves. Maintaining its north-northwesterly direction, I-75 crosses into Anderson County. Beyond this section, the Cumberland Mountains become visible in the distance. At exit 122, the Interstate has an interchange with SR 61 near Clinton. I-75 then descends sharply into a valley, crossing the Clinch River a few miles later. About four miles (6.4 km) later, near the community of Rocky Top, I-75 has interchanges with US 441 and US 25W, beginning a concurrency with the latter. The Interstate then crosses into Campbell County.

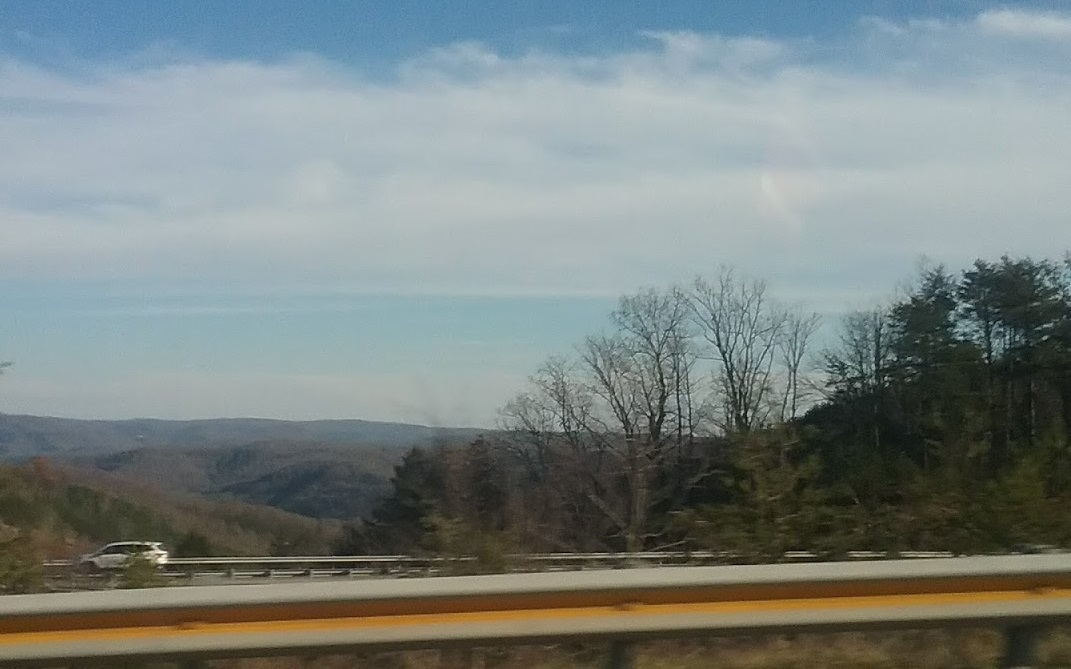
View from I-75 on top of Jellico Mountain near the Kentucky border

For approximately the last 30 miles (48 km) in Tennessee, I-75 traverses the rugged terrain of the Cumberland Mountains. Although this stretch of highway is considered to be scenic, it is one of the most hazardous stretches, which is characterized by steep ascents (northbound) and steep downhill grades (southbound). About two miles (3.2 km) north of Rocky Top, I-75 begins the first of three major ascents for a few miles before leveling out, and. When the highway approaches the community of Caryville, US 25W splits off and I-75 runs concurrently with SR 63. The Interstate then begins a second ascent, which is steeper than the first ascent, adding a truck climbing lane going northbound. About five miles (8.0 km) later, the highway levels out onto a plateau and the truck lane terminates. Less than one mile (1.6 km) later, SR 63 departs near the unincorporated community of Pioneer. Traveling through a further sparsely populated rural area marked by dense woodlands, I-75 remains relatively flat for the next few miles before beginning its final major ascent, this time ascending Jellico Mountain, which in turn is part of the Pine Mountain subrange, and adding a truck climbing lane for the final time. I-75 curves sharply to the northeast, and, about one mile (1.6 km) later, it reaches the peak of Jellico Mountain, where the truck lane ends for the final time. I-75 traverses the peak of Jellico Mountain for approximately the next eight miles (13 km) on a segment marked by rolling hills, and reaches its highest elevation along its entire route, at more than 2,000 feet (610 m). The Interstate then begins a steep descent off of the mountain, beginning a transition into the Cumberland Plateau region. About four miles (6.4 km) later, it levels out and enters the city of Jellico where it has an interchange with US 25W. For the next mile (1.6 km) or so, it has a slight uphill grade before entering the hilly terrain of the Cumberland Plateau in Kentucky.

== History ==
=== Predecessors and planning ===
I-75 was preceded by a network of Native American trails in East Tennessee. One of these trails connected the Chattanooga and Knoxville areas. Another series of trails connected the Knoxville area to Kentucky and Virginia, and included the Cumberland Gap. In 1866, the road between Knoxville and Kingston became the Kingston turnpike, later known as Kingston Pike. In 1915, the road between the Dixie Lee Junction community west of Knoxville and Jellico became part of the Dixie Highway, an auto trail. In 1923, the road between Chattanooga and Knoxville became part of another auto trail, the Lee Highway. In 1926, the United States Numbered Highway System was established. Lee Highway became part of US 11, and the Dixie Highway between Knoxville and Kentucky became US 25W. The road to the east through the Cumberland Gap became US 25E Both of these roads, along with Kingston Pike, were part of the famed "Thunder Road" network used by bootleggers to illegally transport and trade moonshine during Prohibition and afterwards. US 25E is now considered the principal alternate route to I-75 between Knoxville and Kentucky.

The highway that is now I-75 had its origins in the late 1930s, when the federal government began planning for a national "superhighway" system. A 1939 report titled Toll Roads and Free Roads and published by the Bureau of Public Roads (BPR), the predecessor agency to the Federal Highway Administration (FHWA), recommended a controlled-access highway that largely follows the present-day alignment of I-75. This alignment was reaffirmed in the National Interregional Highway Committee's 1944 report, titled Interregional Highways, and a subsequent 1947 plan produced by the Public Roads Administration of the now-defunct Federal Works Agency. When the Interstate Highway System was created by the Federal-Aid Highway Act of 1956, I-75 was part of the 1,047.6 miles (1,685.9 km) of Interstate Highways allocated to Tennessee. The numbering was approved by the American Association of State Highway Officials on August 14, 1957.

=== Early history ===
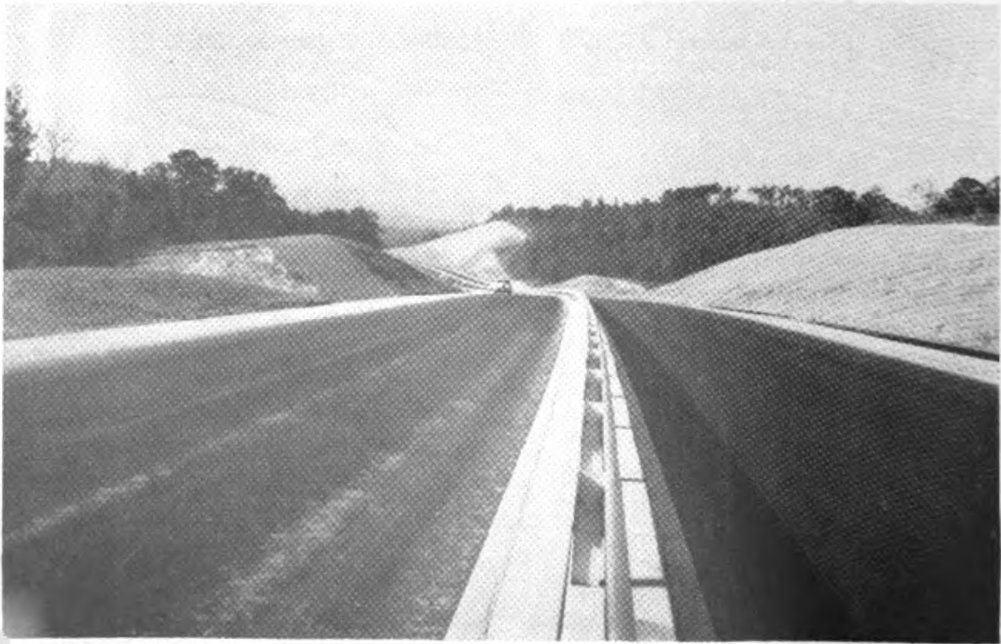
The Summit Bypass in the 1950s.

The first two segments that became I-75 in Tennessee were located in Knoxville and Chattanooga, and were constructed prior to the passage of the Federal-Aid Highway Act of 1956. The segment in Knoxville, which was concurrent with I-40, was approximately 0.6 miles (0.97 km) of a one-mile-long (1.6 km) freeway downtown, completed in two phases on November 14, 1952, and December 10, 1955, that was initially known as the Magnolia Avenue Expressway. The segment of this route that became I-75 was located between Unaka Street and a cloverleaf interchange that became the split between I-75 (now I-275) and I-40. The segment in Chattanooga was an approximately 3.2-mile (5.1 km) relocated segment of US 11 and US 64 between approximately 3/4 mile (1.2 km) north of the present interchange with those routes and SR 317 (Bonny Oaks Drive, then SR 2A) and the interchange with US 11/US 64 (Lee Highway) in Ooltewah. This route, which was initially known as the Summit Bypass, opened to traffic on July 23, 1954, and was constructed as a bypass around a one-lane railroad tunnel in Collegedale that had been the site of many traffic accidents.

Construction of the first original section of I-75 in Tennessee began in late 1956 with short extension of the Summit Bypass. Additional segments in Chattanooga and Knoxville were under construction by 1958. On October 28, 1960, a short segment in Knoxville that is now part of I-275 opened. The interchange with I-24 and the segment extending south to the Georgia state line were let to contract on July 26, 1959, and dedicated on May 31, 1961. The concurrent segment with I-40 between the split near Lenoir City and Papermill Road opened to traffic on December 2, 1961. On December 7, 1962, the short stretch between I-24 and SR 320 opened. In January 1963, the one-mile (1.6 km) section between US 25W in Jellico and the Kentucky state line was opened to traffic, along with a short segment in Kentucky. The route was completed through Chattanooga on July 17, 1963, with the completion of the 6.6-mile (10.6 km) segment between SR 320 and the Summit Bypass north of SR 317 (Bonny Oaks Drive). The short segment between US 321/SR 95 in Lenoir City and the split with I-40 was completed on December 1, 1963. Like much of the Interstate Highway System in rural Tennessee, priority was generally given to completing rural segments in Middle and West Tennessee over East Tennessee, but the last approximately 35-mile (56 km) segment of I-75 in Tennessee, located mostly in Campbell County, was constructed much earlier than most of the rural segments in Tennessee, reportedly due to the influence of then-Representative and later Senator Howard Baker, who was from that area. The concurrent segment with US 25W, located between Rocky Top (then Lake City) and Caryville, was completed in October 1964. Portions of this segment predated the Interstate System. The last segment of what was then I-75 in Knoxville to open was the 1.8-mile (2.9 km) segment concurrent with I-40 between Liberty Street and Unaka Street on December 4, 1964. The section between Ooltewah and SR 60 in Cleveland opened on October 18, 1966.

Work on the 25.8-mile (41.5 km) section between US 25W/SR 63 in Caryville and US 25W in Jellico started in 1963, and the section was dedicated and opened to traffic on October 22, 1968. Construction of this section proved to be one of the most laborious and expensive highway projects in the state at the time, due to the massive amounts of earth and rock which had to be blasted and moved. The 0.7-mile (1.1 km) segment in Rocky Top, located between US 441 and US 25W, opened on September 1, 1970. In December 1970, the 4.9-mile (7.9 km) segment between US 25W/I-640 and SR 131 (an approximately 0.3-mile [0.48 km] portion of which is now I-275) opened. Part of the section between SR 60 and SR 308 in Bradley County began construction in 1968 but was stalled shortly thereafter. Construction resumed in 1972, and the segment was opened to traffic on January 23, 1973. The section between US 25W north of Knoxville and SR 61 in Clinton broke ground in segments, beginning in August 1968, and was opened to traffic on August 1, 1972. The approximately six-mile (9.7 km) segment between SR 61 in Clinton and US 441 in Rocky Top was dedicated and opened on August 31, 1973, completing the route between Knoxville and Detroit. The section of the highway between SR 308 near Charleston and SR 30 in Athens opened on December 24, 1973, and was completed the following spring. The last section of I-75 in Tennessee, approximately 32 miles (51 km) between SR 30 in Athens and US 321/SR 95 in Lenoir City, opened to traffic on December 20, 1974, in a ceremony officiated by then-Governor Winfield Dunn. The last sections of I-40 and I-81 in Tennessee were opened on this same day.

=== Fog hazards ===
An approximately 10-mile (16 km) section of I-75 in northern Bradley and southern McMinn counties, including the bridge over the Hiwassee River, is prone to hazards from dense fog in the morning, which can severely obscure the visibility of drivers. This segment is located near several heavy industries including the Resolute Forest Products paper mill, formerly Bowater, which operates settling ponds along the Interstate. This segment has been the site of several serious multivehicle accidents, the first of which occurred on March 9, 1974, less than three months after the section opened to traffic, and before it had been declared complete. This accident involved 18 vehicles, killing three and injuring 10. A total of six multivehicle accidents occurred along this stretch in the 1970s. The worst, which took place on November 5, 1978, involved 62 vehicles and injured 46, and took place on the Hiwassee River Bridge. After a multivehicle accident on April 15, 1979, that involved 18 vehicles, killed three, and injured 14, the Tennessee Department of Transportation (TDOT) identified the stretch as prone to fog hazards and agreed to install warning signs with flashing lights, which would activate if fog was detected. After this, no serious fog related accidents occurred for more than 11 years.

On December 11, 1990, a 99-vehicle accident occurred in this same area, causing 12 deaths and 56 injuries. Extensive investigations followed, and several lawsuits were filed against Bowater, alleging that they had contributed to the fog with their water vapor emissions, and the state of Tennessee, alleging that TDOT had failed to install adequate warning systems along this stretch of I-75. The existing fog warning lights were reportedly not working the day of the accident. After settling with the family members of accident victims and survivors in court, TDOT instituted several safety measures along this stretch of highway, including re-striping the roadway with extra markings to make it more visible and installing a computerized fog detection system, which contains a warning system with flashing lights, electronic signs, variable speed limits, and electronic controlled swing gates which block access to the Interstate from six entrance ramps in and near this stretch in the event of dense fog. Between mileposts 31 and 39, the highway is designated as a fog advisory zone. The $4.5 million (equivalent to $9.04 million in 2025) system began operation in December 1993, and, in 2006, a $6.6 million (equivalent to $10.1 million in 2025) upgrade was completed which installed video cameras. Bowater also agreed to limit the use of their settling pond closest to the Interstate. The accident was profiled in a 1997 episode of the show Forensic Files.

=== Geological difficulties ===
The entire section of I-75 in Tennessee north of Knoxville has been subject to many geological difficulties, particularly the last 30 miles (48 km) through the Cumberland Mountains. In March 2005, the southbound lanes of Interstate 75 were shut down between milemarkers 141 and 143 due to a rockslide below the roadway that caused the pavement to partially collapse. In March 2012, the southbound lanes of the Interstate were again closed to traffic between milemarkers 141 and 143 in Campbell County, Tennessee due to a slide beneath the roadway. This was later followed by a second slide in early May 2012 that caused a portion of the southbound lanes to completely erode and forced the detour lanes to be closed. In February 2016, a rock slide closed I-75 near Caryville.

=== Other incidents ===
On March 28, 1994, a runaway barge that had broken loose from its mooring due to flooding struck the I-75 bridge over the Tennessee River, along with the US 11 bridge and a railroad bridge. The collision broke loose a chunk of concrete from a post, but engineers determined that it caused no major structural damage. I-75 had been closed to traffic on this section in preparation for the collision.

On April 1, 2019, part of the bridge on I-75 southbound over the ramp from I-24 westbound to I-75 northbound at the split in Chattanooga collapsed, injuring one person and blocking traffic for hours. The bridge, built in 1959, was one of the oldest on I-75 in Tennessee, and the interchange had been the site of frequent accidents. TDOT's chief engineer said that the collapse was most likely caused by weakening of the bridge's rail that occurred when an illegally oversized load hit the bridge.

=== Improvements ===
Throughout its history, I-75 has seen reconstruction and widening projects in Tennessee.

==== Knoxville projects ====
On June 22, 1980, the American Association of State Highway Transportation Officials approved rerouting I-75 from Downtown Knoxville onto the western leg of I-640. The old route of I-75 between I-40 and I-640/US 25W became I-275. This redesignation went into effect when the western leg of I-640 was completed and opened to traffic on December 23, 1980, and was intended to remove through traffic from downtown Knoxville in preparation for the 1982 World's Fair. This I-75/640 concurrency is somewhat unusual in that the exit numbers and mile markers follow the auxiliary route I-640 instead of I-75 mileage. The stretch of I-40/75 between Papermill Road and the western terminus with I-640, as well as the portion of I-40 continuing into downtown, were widened to six lanes between May 1980 and March 1982, less than two months before the fair opened.

By the mid-1970s, the concurrent segment of I-40 with I-75 between Lenoir City and western Knoxville was congested. The FHWA authorized TDOT in 1978 to widen the section from the I-75 interchange near Lenoir City to the Pellissippi Parkway to six lanes and the segment from the Pellissippi Parkway to I-640 to eight lanes, and to reconstruct interchanges along this section. TDOT announced plans to proceed with the project in May 1981, initially choosing to widen the entire segment to six lanes due to the need for immediate congestion relief and additional right-of-way required by the larger project. The six-lane project began in July 1984 with the segment between Papermill Road and the Pellissippi Parkway, and was completed in December 1985. The remainder of the project, located between the Pellissippi Parkway and the I-75 split, was done from June 1985 to July 1986.

On October 9, 1986, the FHWA approved an environmental impact statement (EIS) for the remainder of the I-40/I-75 improvement project. The first phase, between August 1990 and August 1994, widened the section from east of the Pellissippi Parkway to east of Cedar Bluff Road and reconstructed the Cedar Bluff Road interchange. In preparation for the second phase, Gallaher View Road was extended north to the Interstate between April 1994 and July 1996 with a new overpass and on-ramp. The second phase, from May 1996 to December 1999, widened the section from east of Cedar Bluff Road to east of Gallaher View Road and extended Bridgewater Road to the Interstate. The interchange with Walker Springs Road was replaced, providing access to all three roads via collector–distributor frontage roads. The third phase, from early 2000 to late 2002, widened the segment linking Papermill Road to I-640 from six to 10 lanes. The fourth phase, from September 2000 to July 2003, improved the interchange with SR 131 and widened the section to the Pellissippi Parkway. The final phase, from January 2003 to December 2006, widened the section connecting Gallaher View Road to Papermill Road and reconfigured the interchanges with the US 11/70 connector and Papermill Road. A collector–distributor facility serving the westbound ramps was built along the Papermill interchange, and ramps to Weisgarber Road and SR 332 were constructed.

The four-mile (6.4 km) section of I-75 from north of I-640/275 and SR 131 (Lovell Road) was widened to six lanes between March 1998 and August 1999. On May 1, 2008, I-75 northbound traffic was rerouted back along its original path in Downtown Knoxville along I-275 as part of SmartFIX40, a major construction project that included rebuilding and closing a portion of I-40 downtown to all traffic. Traffic was rerouted along I-275 as the ramp from I-640 eastbound/I-75 northbound to I-75 northbound is only one lane which causes traffic delays at peak times. The project was completed on June 12, 2009, at which time I-75 traffic was returned to its normal configuration.

==== Chattanooga projects ====
I-75 was widened from four to six and eight lanes in Chattanooga between the interchange with I-24 and SR 153 in the early 1990s. Between 1998 and 2010, a series of projects reconstructed and widened I-75 between SR 153 and north of US 11/US 64 in Ooltewah. The first of these projects, which began in September 1998 and was completed in 2001 after multiple delays, rebuilt the interchange with SR 153, changing the approach of two flyover ramps that connect to I-75 northbound from the left to the right side of the road. This project also modified the interchange with SR 320, removing two cloverleaf loop ramps from I-75 southbound and moving the access to the entrance ramp from I-75 southbound to a point near the interchange with SR 153. The next project, which widened I-75 further between mileposts 6 and 9 and improved the interchange with SR 317, began in early 2002 and was completed in November 2005, also after several delays. The next phase, which began in August 2004 and was completed in December 2006, widened the section from north of SR 317 to south of US 11/64 from four to eight lanes. As part of this project, a new interchange was constructed in 2006 to provide access to the Enterprise South Industrial Park, which at that time was in the process of redevelopment. This interchange, which became exit 9, now provides access to the Volkswagen Chattanooga Assembly Plant and was not opened until August 20, 2010, when the connector road was completed. A segment of SR 317 was later routed onto a concurrency of I-75 between exit 7 and this interchange. Exit 9 was designated as the Bredesen–Ramsey Interchange in 2015 in honor of the efforts of then-Governor Phil Bredesen and county Mayor Claude Ramsey to bring Volkswagen to Chattanooga. The last of these projects, which began on November 8, 2007, widened I-75 from approximately mileposts 10 to 13, just north of the interchange of US 11/US 64, and included reconstruction of this interchange, including the addition of a loop ramp, and improvements on this road. This project was completed on August 12, 2010, four months ahead of schedule.

In December 2018, a contract was awarded to rebuild the interchange with I-24 in Chattanooga, with preliminary work beginning in May 2019. The project consisted of eliminating left-hand entrance and exit ramps from I-75 onto I-24, straightening curves, widening I-75 to six lanes through the interchange, widening two ramps from I-75 to I-24 to three lanes, replacing two overpass bridges, and construction of a collector–distributor facility that carries traffic directly from US 41 and the Tennessee welcome center along I-75 southbound, providing direct access to both I-75 southbound and I-24 westbound. Additional space was also provided to widen the remaining ramps between I-75 and I-24 to three lanes, which will be done in the second phase. The project was completed on August 19, 2021, at a cost of $133.5 million, making it the second-most expensive individual contract in state history at the time. Construction on the second phase began on July 13, 2023. This project consists of extending the auxiliary lanes along I-75 to SR 320, replacing the bridge over the CSX railroad between the two interchanges with a higher bridge, expansion of the ramps in the interchange into their final alignments, and widening I-24 west of the split. The project was originally slated for completion in late summer 2025, but in April 2025, TDOT officials announced that the section of I-75 around the railroad crossing and the SR 320 interchange was behind schedule, and the project would continue past its original deadline. In July 2025, further delays were reported, and the projected completion date was revised to spring 2026. The delays were reported to have been caused by coordination problems with CSX over the replacement of the railroad bridge, which pushed the start of that portion of the project to early 2024. The final phase was completed and dedicated in a ceremony on April 24, 2026.

== Future ==
In the mid-1990s, a freeway, referred to as SR 475 (with the intent of being renamed I-475), was proposed as an outer beltway around Knoxville, running north of the city between I-75/I-40 near Farragut, and I-40 near Sevierville. A number of studies were conducted on the proposed route, but the entire project was canceled on June 25, 2010.

TDOT has approved the widening of several segments of I-75 in Tennessee from four to six lanes, including the approximately nine-mile (14 km) segment between US 11/US 64 in Ooltewah and APD-40 in Cleveland, the 16-mile (26 km) segment between SR 323 near Philadelphia and the interchange with I-40 near Lenoir City, and the five-mile (8.0 km) segment between SR 131 near Powell and SR 170.

== Exit list ==
The exits north of Knoxville are numbered based on I-75's original path through Downtown Knoxville along I-40 and I-275.

County	Location	mi	km	Exit	Destinations	Notes
Hamilton	East Ridge	0.00	0.00		I-75 south (SR 401) – Atlanta	Continuation into Georgia
Hamilton	East Ridge	0.32	0.51	1	US 41 (US 76 / SR 8) – East Ridge	Northbound lanes has a collector–distributor lane that directly connects US 41 northbound to I-24 (exit 2) without merging on the mainline I-75
Hamilton	East Ridge	1.44	2.32	2	I-24 west to I-59 south – Chattanooga, Nashville, Birmingham US 74 east	Southern end of US 74 concurrency; eastern terminus and exits 185A-B on I-24; northbound signed as Nashville; southbound signed as I-59 and Birmingham; western terminus of US 74
Hamilton	Chattanooga	3.51	5.65	3	SR 320 (East Brainerd Road)	Signed as exits 3A (east) and 3B (west) northbound
Hamilton	Chattanooga	4.24	6.82	4	SR 153 north – Chattanooga Airport, Chickamauga Dam	
Hamilton	Chattanooga	5.10	8.21	4A	Hamilton Place Boulevard	Northbound exit only; access to Hamilton Place Mall
Hamilton	Chattanooga	5.69	9.16	5	Shallowford Road	
Hamilton	Chattanooga	6.50	10.46		Standifer Gap Road	Removed c. 1970
Hamilton	Chattanooga	7.53	12.12	7	US 11 south / US 64 west (Old Lee Highway / SR 2 west) / SR 317 west (Bonny Oaks Drive) – Summit, Collegedale	Southern end of US 11/US 64/SR 2 concurrency; signed as exits 7A (SR 317 east) and 7B (SR 317 west) northbound
Hamilton	Chattanooga	9.05	14.56	9	SR 317 (Apison Pike) – Ooltewah, Collegedale / Volkswagen Drive	Serves Volkswagen Chattanooga Assembly Plant
Hamilton	Chattanooga	11.66	18.76	11	US 11 north / US 64 east (SR 2 east) – Ooltewah, Collegedale	Northern end of US 11/US 64/SR 2 concurrency
Bradley	Cleveland	20.52	33.02	20	US 64 Byp. east (US 74 east / SR 311) – Cleveland	Northern end of US 74 concurrency
Bradley	Cleveland	25.05	40.31	25	SR 60 – Cleveland, Dayton	
Bradley	Cleveland	26.80	43.13	27	Paul Huff Parkway – Cleveland	
Bradley		32.83	52.83	33	SR 308 – Charleston	
McMinn		36.09	58.08	36	SR 163 – Calhoun	
McMinn		42.31	68.09	42	SR 39 (Riceville Road) – Riceville	
McMinn	Athens	48.79	78.52	49	SR 30 – Decatur, Athens	
McMinn		52.17	83.96	52	SR 305 (Mount Verd Road) – Athens	
McMinn		56.13	90.33	56	SR 309 – Niota	
Monroe	Sweetwater	60.61	97.54	60	SR 68 – Spring City, Sweetwater	
Monroe	Sweetwater	62.78	101.03	62	SR 322 (Oakland Road) – Sweetwater	
Loudon		68.76	110.66	68	SR 323 – Philadelphia	
Loudon	Loudon	72.15	116.11	72	SR 72 – Loudon	
Loudon		76.69	123.42	76	SR 324 (Sugar Limb Road)	
Loudon	Lenoir City	81.48	131.13	81	US 321 (SR 73) to SR 95 – Oak Ridge, Lenoir City, Maryville	
Loudon		84.64	136.21	84B	I-40 west – Nashville	Southern end of I-40 concurrency; no exit number southbound; I-40 exit 368 westbound
Knox	Farragut	85.85	138.16	369 (Note: Concurrency uses I-40 exit numbers)	Watt Road	
Knox	Farragut	89.63	144.25	373	Campbell Station Road – Farragut	
Knox	Knoxville	91.39	147.08	374	SR 131 (Lovell Road)	
Knox	Knoxville	92.74	149.25	376	I-140 east / SR 162 north – Oak Ridge, Maryville	Signed as exits 376A (north) and 376B (east) on collector/distributor lanes; I-140 exits 1C-D westbound
Knox	Knoxville	94.54	152.15	378	Cedar Bluff Road	Signed as exits 378A (south) and 378B (north) southbound; southbound exit 378B also serves Executive Park Drive
Knox	Knoxville	95.78– 96.39	154.14– 155.12	379	Bridgewater Road, Walker Springs Road, Gallaher View Road	Signed as exits 379 (Bridgewater Road, Walker Springs Road) and 379A (Gallaher View Road) southbound
Knox	Knoxville	97.32	156.62	380	US 11 / US 70 (Kingston Pike / SR 1) – West Hills, West Town Mall	Also access to Montvue Road
Knox	Knoxville	99.33– 99.85	159.86– 160.69	383	SR 332 (Northshore Drive/Papermill Drive) / Weisgarber Road	Complete access to Papermill Drive; southbound exit and entrance only for Weisgarber Road; northbound exit and entrance only for SR 332 (Northshore Drive); southbound entrance and exit ramps accessible via collector-distributor slip ramp
Knox	Knoxville	101.89	163.98	385	I-40 east – Knoxville I-640 east	Northern end of I-40 concurrency; western terminus of I-640; no exit number southbound
Knox	Knoxville	103.10	165.92	1 (Note: Concurrency uses I-640 exit numbers)	SR 62 (Western Avenue)	Northbound split into separate unnumbered exits for eastbound and westbound exits on collector–distributor lanes
Knox	Knoxville	104.74	168.56	3B	US 25W north (SR 9 north) / Gap Road – Clinton	Northbound exit only
Knox	Knoxville	105.22	169.34	3	I-640 east (US 25W south / SR 9 south) – Asheville	Northern end of I-640 concurrency; no exit number northbound; no exits from I-75 to US 25W northbound
Knox	Knoxville	105.42	169.66	3	I-275 south – Knoxville	No exit number southbound; former routing of I-75
Knox	Knoxville	106.35	171.15	108	Merchants Drive	Southbound access to northbound US 25W
Knox	Knoxville	108.08	173.94	110	Callahan Drive	
Knox	Knoxville	109.82	176.74	112	SR 131 (Emory Road) – Powell	
Knox		114.65	184.51	117	SR 170 (Raccoon Valley Road)	
Anderson		120.12	193.31	122	SR 61 – Clinton, Norris	
Anderson	Rocky Top	125.97	202.73	128	US 441 (SR 71) – Rocky Top	
Anderson	Rocky Top	126.64	203.81	129	US 25W south (SR 9 south / SR 116) – Rocky Top	Southern end of US 25W/SR 9 concurrency
Campbell	Caryville	132.32	212.95	134	US 25W north / SR 63 east (SR 9 north) – Caryville, Jacksboro, LaFollette	Northern end of US 25W/SR 9 concurrency; southern end of SR 63 concurrency
Campbell	Caryville	138.70	223.22	141	SR 63 west – Huntsville, Oneida	Northern end of SR 63 concurrency
Campbell		142.21	228.86	144	Stinking Creek Road	
Campbell		153.61	247.21	156	Rarity Mountain Road	
Campbell	Jellico	158.14	254.50	160	US 25W (SR 9) – Jellico	
Campbell	Jellico	159.08	256.01		I-75 north – Lexington	Continuation into Kentucky
1.000 mi = 1.609 km; 1.000 km = 0.621 mi: Concurrency terminus; Closed/former; Incomplete access

== Notes ==
Interstate 75
Previous state: Georgia	Tennessee	Next state: Kentucky
