= Tennessee State Route 163 =

State highway in Tennessee, United States

State Route 163
- SR 163 highlighted in red

Route information
- Maintained by TDOT
- Length: 16.2 mi (26.1 km)

Major junctions
- West end: I-75 near Calhoun
- US 11 in Calhoun
- East end: US 411 / SR 30 in Delano

Location
- Country: United States
- State: Tennessee
- Counties: McMinn, Polk

Highway system
- Tennessee State Routes; Interstate; US; State
← SR 162	→ SR 164

State Route 163 (SR 163) is an east-west state highway in McMinn and Polk counties of East Tennessee. It connects Calhoun and Delano, along with serving as the main access road between Interstate 75 (I-75) and Calhoun.

== Route description ==
Officially, SR 163 begins in McMinn County at an interchange with I-75 (Exit 36). West of the interchange, the route travels as Lamontville Road through rural wooded areas running parallel to the Hiwassee River, until it reaches SR 58 in Meigs County. About 2.5 miles (4.0 km) east of I-75 the highway enters Calhoun and comes to an intersection and runs concurrently with US 11 (SR 2, Lee Highway) for about 1/2 mile (0.80 km). They go south near a paper mill operated by Resolute Forest Products, formerly Bowater, before entering a business district, where SR 163 splits off and goes through downtown as Bowater Road. SR 163 then leaves both Calhoun and the Hiwassee River behind and continues east through farmland rural areas to cross into Polk County. About 1 mile (1.6 km) later, the highway enters the unincorporated community of Delano and comes to an end at an intersection with US 411/SR 30 (SR 33).

== Major intersections ==
County	Location	mi	km	Destinations	Notes
McMinn		0.0	0.0	I-75 – Chattanooga, Knoxville	I-75 exit 36; western terminus; road continues west as Lamontville Road
McMinn	Calhoun			US 11 north (Lee Highway/SR 2 east) – Riceville, Athens	Western end of wrong-way US 11/SR 2 concurrency
McMinn	Calhoun			US 11 south (Lee Highway/SR 2 west) – Charleston, Cleveland	Eastern end of wrong-way US 11/SR 2 concurrency
Polk	Delano	16.2	26.1	US 411 / SR 30 (SR 33) – Etowah, Benton	Eastern terminus
1.000 mi = 1.609 km; 1.000 km = 0.621 mi: Concurrency terminus
