= Tennessee State Route 308 =

Highway in Tennessee

State Route 308
- Lauderdale Memorial Highway; Lower River Road
- SR 308 highlighted in red

Route information
- Maintained by TDOT
- Length: 7.5 mi (12.1 km)
- Existed: July 1, 1983–present

Major junctions
- East end: SR 306 in northwest Bradley County
- I-75 in northern Bradley County
- West end: US 11 in Charleston

Location
- Country: United States
- State: Tennessee
- Counties: Bradley

Highway system
- Tennessee State Routes; Interstate; US; State
← SR 307	→ SR 309

State Route 308 (SR 308) is a secondary state route located in northern Bradley County, Tennessee, that serves the city of Charleston. The route is 7.5 miles (12.1 km) long and is located entirely in Bradley County.

== Route description ==
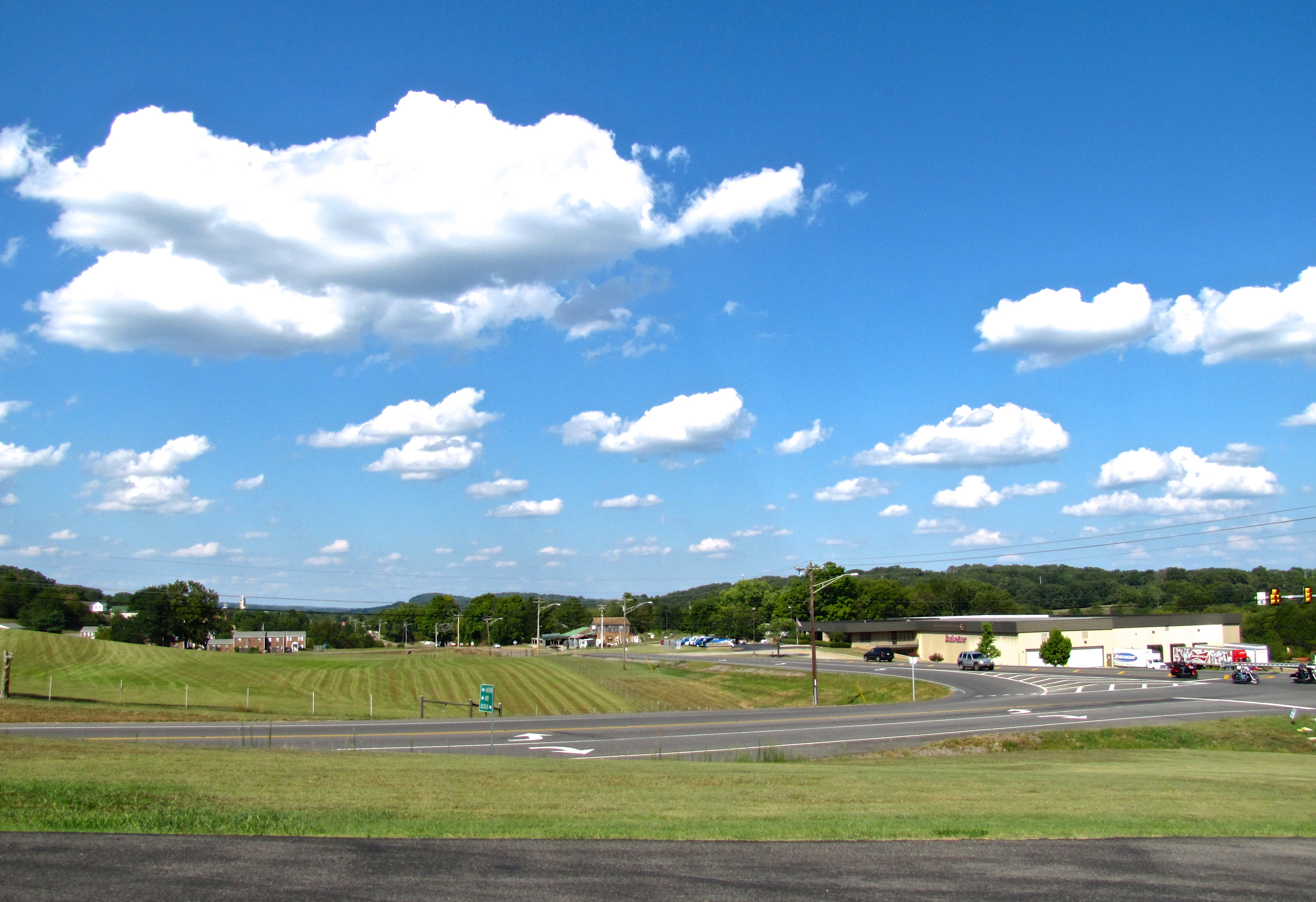
Intersection of SR 308 (left) and U.S. 11 in Charleston.

SR 308 begins at a bearing intersection with SR 306 (Eureka Road, Lower River Road) in northwestern Bradley County. SR 306 continues south to the community of Hopewell northwest of Cleveland, and turns northwest to Meigs County and SR 58. The route continues north as Lower River Road, taking its name from its parallel of the Hiwassee River, and crosses the Chickamauga Lake impoundment where Candies Creek runs into the river. Approximately one mile (1.6 km) later, the road turns sharp east, crossing Candies Creek Ridge a short distance later before coming to an intersection with Old Lower River Road, the former route of SR 308, almost two miles (3.2 km) later. The route then turns sharp south and runs straight for another mile, before turning east once again, and coming to an interchange with I-75. The route then becomes known as Lauderdale Memorial Highway. The route continues for another mile, passing through the southern edge of an industrial area, and crosses South Mouse Creek, before entering farmland and passing Walker Valley High School. A short distance later, the road comes to a four-way intersection with Walker Valley Road, and begins a steep ascent over a ridge. Approximately one mile (1.6 km) later, it meets its eastern terminus in southern Charleston with US 11 (North Lee Highway/Hiwassee Street/SR 2) after descending the ridge.

== History ==
The route originally continued to Charleston along the Hiwassee on what is now Old Lower River Road. This route is very curvy, and contains a one-lane bridge across Mouse Creek. For this reason, part of the highway was moved to its current location on a new alignment in the early 1970s when the Interstate was built. The new section between I-75 and US 11 was named Lauderdale Memorial Highway in memory of a superintendent of the Bradley County Road Department who died months before its completion and had lobbied for its construction. The northern edge of the industrial area traversed by SR 308 is located on the old road, which includes such industries as Wacker Polysilicon and Olin Corporation.

== Major intersections ==
The entire route is in Bradley County.

Location	mi	km	Destinations	Notes
	0.0	0.0	SR 306 – Cleveland, Hopewell	Western terminus
	4.2– 4.4	6.8– 7.1	I-75 – Chattanooga, Knoxville	Exit 33 on I-75
Charleston	7.5	12.1	US 11 (SR 2) – Cleveland, Athens	Eastern terminus
1.000 mi = 1.609 km; 1.000 km = 0.621 mi
