= Philadelphia, Tennessee =

- City
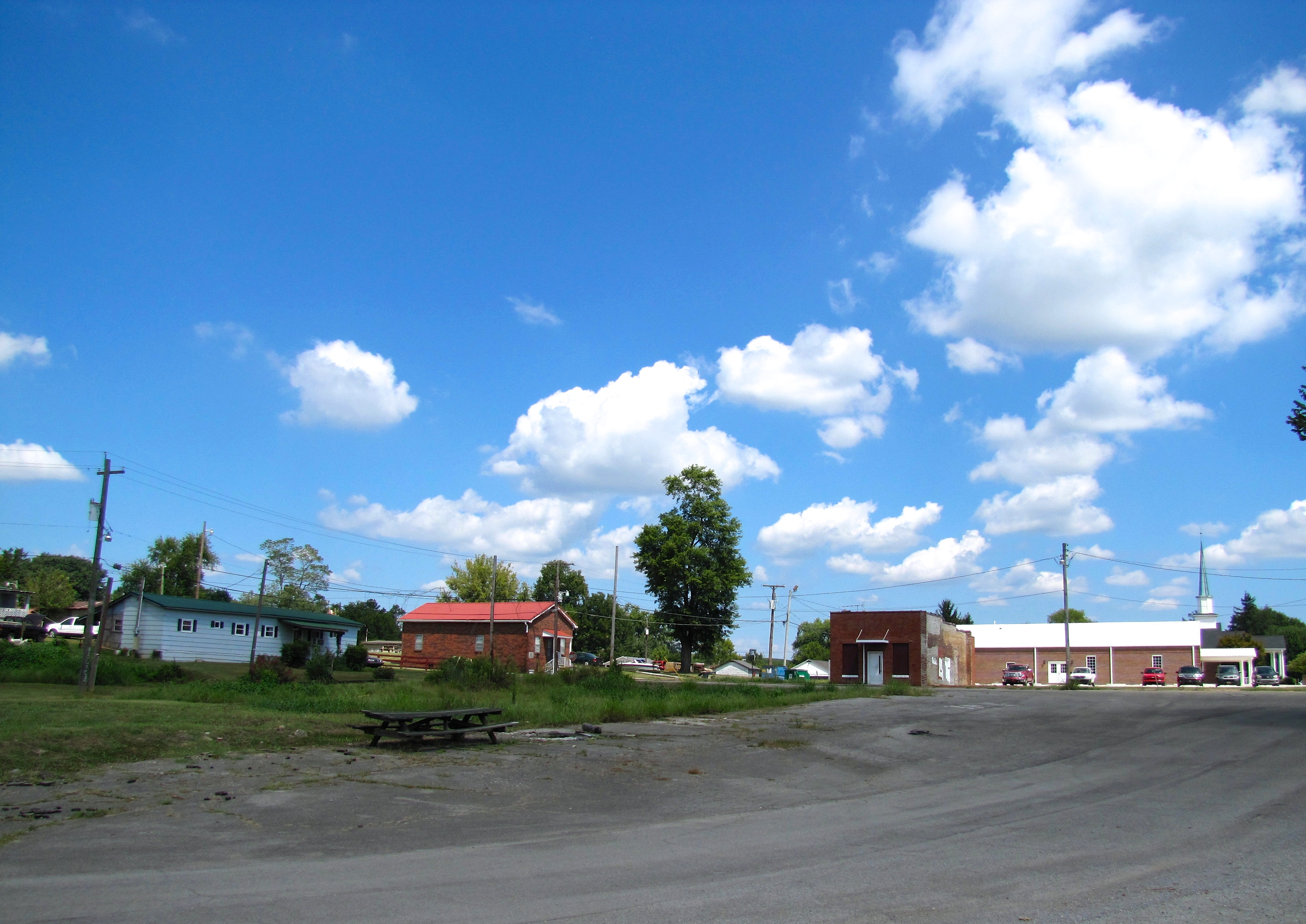
- Philadelphia, Tennessee

- Location of Philadelphia in Loudon County, Tennessee.
- Coordinates: 35°40′45″N 84°24′00″W
- Country: United States
- State: Tennessee
- County: Loudon
- Founded: 1822
- Incorporated: 1968

Area
  - Total: 1.56 sq mi (4.03 km^{2})
  - Land: 1.56 sq mi (4.03 km^{2})
  - Water: 0 sq mi (0.00 km^{2})
- Elevation: 879 ft (268 m)

Population (2020)
  - Total: 607
  - Density: 390.3/sq mi (150.71/km^{2})
- Time zone: UTC-5 (Eastern (EST))
  - Summer (DST): UTC-4 (EDT)
- ZIP code: 37846
- Area code: 865
- FIPS code: 47-57900
- GNIS feature ID: 2404511
- Website: https://philadelphiatn.com/

Philadelphia is a city in Loudon County, Tennessee, United States. As of the 2020 census, Philadelphia had a population of 607. It is included in the Knoxville Metropolitan Statistical Area.

== History ==
Philadelphia was founded in the early 1820s by William Knox and Jacob Pearson. The town initially grew quickly and prospered as a center of business in the Sweetwater Valley. By the mid-19th century, Philadelphia had two general stores, a tanning yard, a stillhouse, and a hotel.

On October 20, 1863, during the Civil War, two Confederate cavalry regiments attacked and routed a Union brigade at Philadelphia while conducting maneuvers following the Battle of Chickamauga. The Confederates captured 700 soldiers, six cannon, and 50 supply wagons.

On October 20, 2001, there was a reenactment of the events in 1863.

== Geography ==
Philadelphia is situated along Sweetwater Creek, which empties into the Watts Bar Lake impoundment of the Tennessee River a few miles to the north.

Philadelphia is concentrated around an area northwest of the junction of U.S. Route 11 (Lee Highway), which connects Philadelphia with Loudon to the north and Sweetwater to the south, and State Route 323 (Pond Creek Road), which connects Philadelphia with Interstate 75 to the west.

According to the United States Census Bureau, the city has a total area of 1.6 square miles (4.1 km^{2}), all land.

== Demographics ==
Historical population
Census	Pop.	Note	%±
1880	332		—
1970	554		—
1980	507		−8.5%
1990	463		−8.7%
2000	533		15.1%
2010	656		23.1%
2020	607		−7.5%

=== 2020 census ===
As of the 2020 census, Philadelphia had a population of 607, and there were 213 families residing in the city.

The median age was 37.5 years. 23.6% of residents were under the age of 18 and 15.3% of residents were 65 years of age or older. For every 100 females there were 95.2 males, and for every 100 females age 18 and over there were 95.0 males age 18 and over.

0.0% of residents lived in urban areas, while 100.0% lived in rural areas.

There were 214 households in Philadelphia, of which 44.4% had children under the age of 18 living in them. Of all households, 50.5% were married-couple households, 17.8% were households with a male householder and no spouse or partner present, and 26.2% were households with a female householder and no spouse or partner present. About 21.4% of all households were made up of individuals and 12.6% had someone living alone who was 65 years of age or older.

There were 245 housing units, of which 12.7% were vacant. The homeowner vacancy rate was 1.3% and the rental vacancy rate was 4.8%.

Racial composition as of the 2020 census
Race	Number	Percent
White	495	81.5%
Black or African American	23	3.8%
American Indian and Alaska Native	1	0.2%
Asian	0	0.0%
Native Hawaiian and Other Pacific Islander	2	0.3%
Some other race	49	8.1%
Two or more races	37	6.1%
Hispanic or Latino (of any race)	76	12.5%

=== 2000 census ===
As of the census of 2000, there was a population of 533, with 205 households and 150 families residing in the city. The population density was 333.5 inhabitants per square mile (128.8/km^{2}). There were 222 housing units at an average density of 138.9 per square mile (53.6/km^{2}). The racial makeup of the city was 92.87% White, 4.13% African American, 0.75% Native American, 0.19% Asian, and 2.06% from two or more races. Hispanic or Latino of any race were 0.38% of the population.

There were 205 households, out of which 31.2% had children under the age of 18 living with them, 60.0% were married couples living together, 10.2% had a female householder with no husband present, and 26.8% were non-families. 22.0% of all households were made up of individuals, and 11.2% had someone living alone who was 65 years of age or older. The average household size was 2.60 and the average family size was 3.09.

In the city, the population was spread out, with 26.3% under the age of 18, 6.6% from 18 to 24, 30.4% from 25 to 44, 22.7% from 45 to 64, and 14.1% who were 65 years of age or older. The median age was 36 years. For every 100 females, there were 97.4 males. For every 100 females age 18 and over, there were 99.5 males.

The median income for a household in the city was $31,563, and the median income for a family was $39,792. Males had a median income of $30,875 versus $14,318 for females. The per capita income for the city was $12,239. About 13.1% of families and 17.3% of the population were below the poverty line, including 22.3% of those under age 18 and 15.9% of those age 65 or over.

== Education ==
Philadelphia is served by Loudon County Schools. Philadelphia pupils are zoned to the Philadelphia School (kindergarten to grade 8) and Loudon High School (grades 9-12) in Loudon.
