= Dixie Lee Junction, Tennessee =

- Unincorporated community
- Dixie Lee Junction
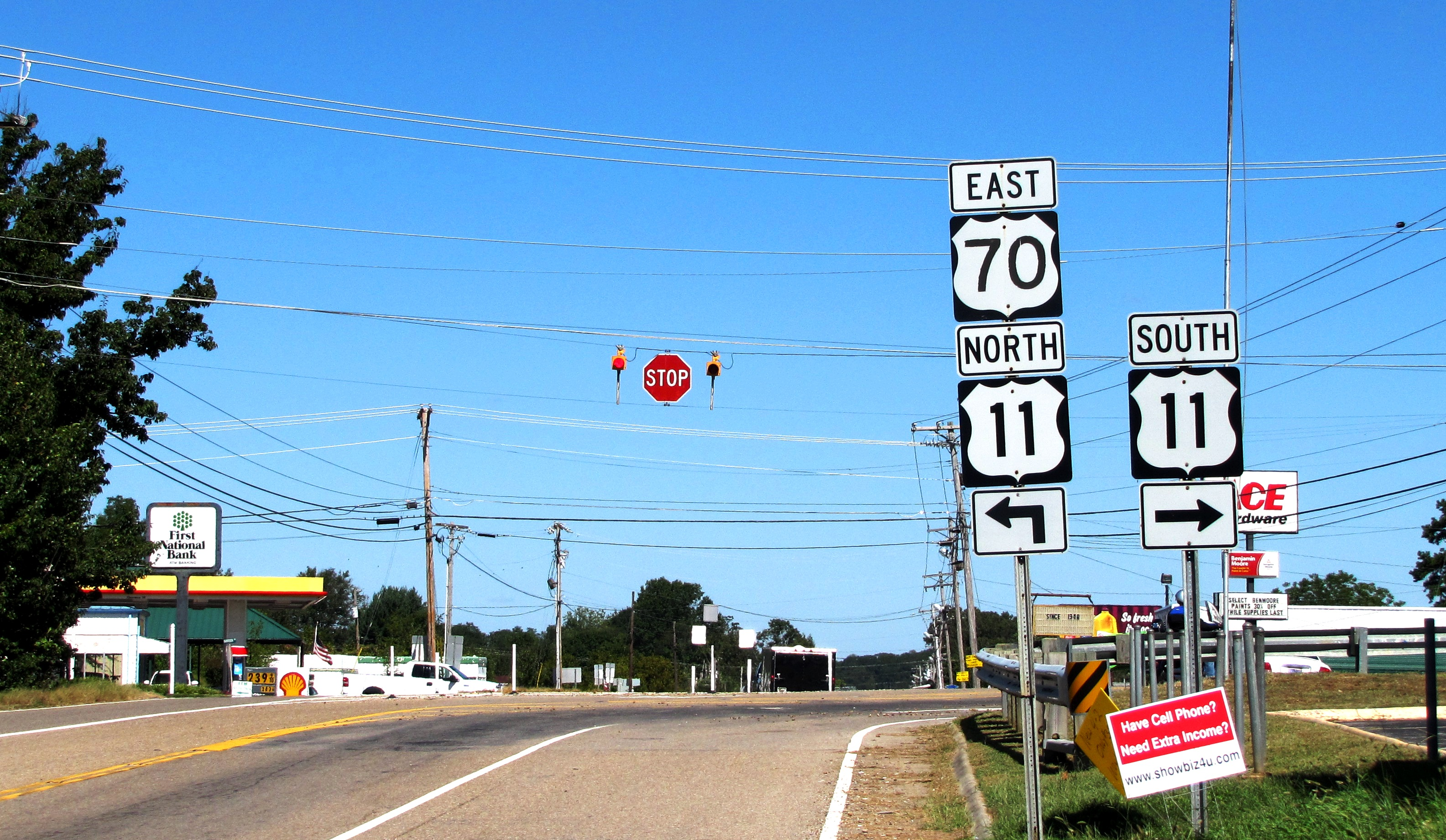
- The intersection of US 70 and US 11 at Dixie Lee Junction

- Location within Tennessee Location within the United States
- Coordinates: 35°51′37″N 84°13′33″W
- Country: United States
- State: Tennessee
- County: Loudon
- Elevation: 988 ft (301 m)
- Time zone: UTC-5 (Eastern (EST))
  - Summer (DST): UTC-4 (EDT)
- ZIP code: 37772
- Area code: 865
- GNIS feature ID: 1282515

Dixie Lee Junction is an unincorporated community in Loudon County, Tennessee, United States, situated at the intersection of U.S. Route 70 (US 70) and U.S. Route 11 (US 11). The community is named for its historical location at the junction of the eastern leg of the Dixie Highway (which followed US 70 through the region) and the Lee Highway (which followed US 11). From the advent of automobile travel in the late 1920s until the construction of the Interstate Highway System in the late 1950s and 1960s, these two highways were major cross-country routes, and Dixie Lee Junction developed as a "last chance" stopover for tourists traveling southward from Knoxville. While the completion of the interstates drew away most of the cross-country traffic, the US 70/US 11 intersection still serves a strategic role as the western end of the four-lane Kingston Pike, a major commercial thoroughfare in western Knox County.

The Dixie Lee Junction community lies adjacent to the town of Farragut, with the Knox-Loudon county line (which runs perpendicular to Kingston Pike) being the technical boundary between the two communities. US 70 approaches Dixie Lee Junction from Kingston to the west, and US 11 approaches from Lenoir City to the southwest. The merged highways then continue eastward for 20 miles (32 km) through Farragut and Knoxville. Two major interstate highways, Interstate 40 (I-40) and I-75, merge just northwest of Dixie Lee Junction.

The Dixie Highway was conceived in 1914 to provide a convenient route from the Midwestern United States to Florida. Its eastern section entered downtown Knoxville via Broadway before veering westward along Cumberland Avenue and out into West Knoxville along Kingston Pike. The Lee Highway, which connected New York and San Francisco, entered Knoxville from Bean Station to the northeast, and merged with the Dixie Highway in downtown Knoxville.

Knoxville lay along the Dixie Highway roughly halfway between the Midwestern states and Florida, and thus made a convenient place for Florida-bound tourists to stop for the night. Throughout the 1930s, 1940s, and 1950s, Kingston Pike was lined with motor courts and motels, and restaurants with oddly-shaped buildings and flashy signs designed to catch the attention of passers-by. Businesses in Dixie Lee Junction during this period consisted of "last-chance" ventures that provided food, fuel, and other supplies before south-bound drivers entered a predominantly-rural stretch of the highway en route to Chattanooga.

== Arts and culture ==
Ronnie James Dio's band Elf released a song "Dixie Lee Junction" about the community on their 1972 album Elf.
