= Tiftonia =

Coordinates: 35°01′13″N 85°21′58″W

- Neighborhood
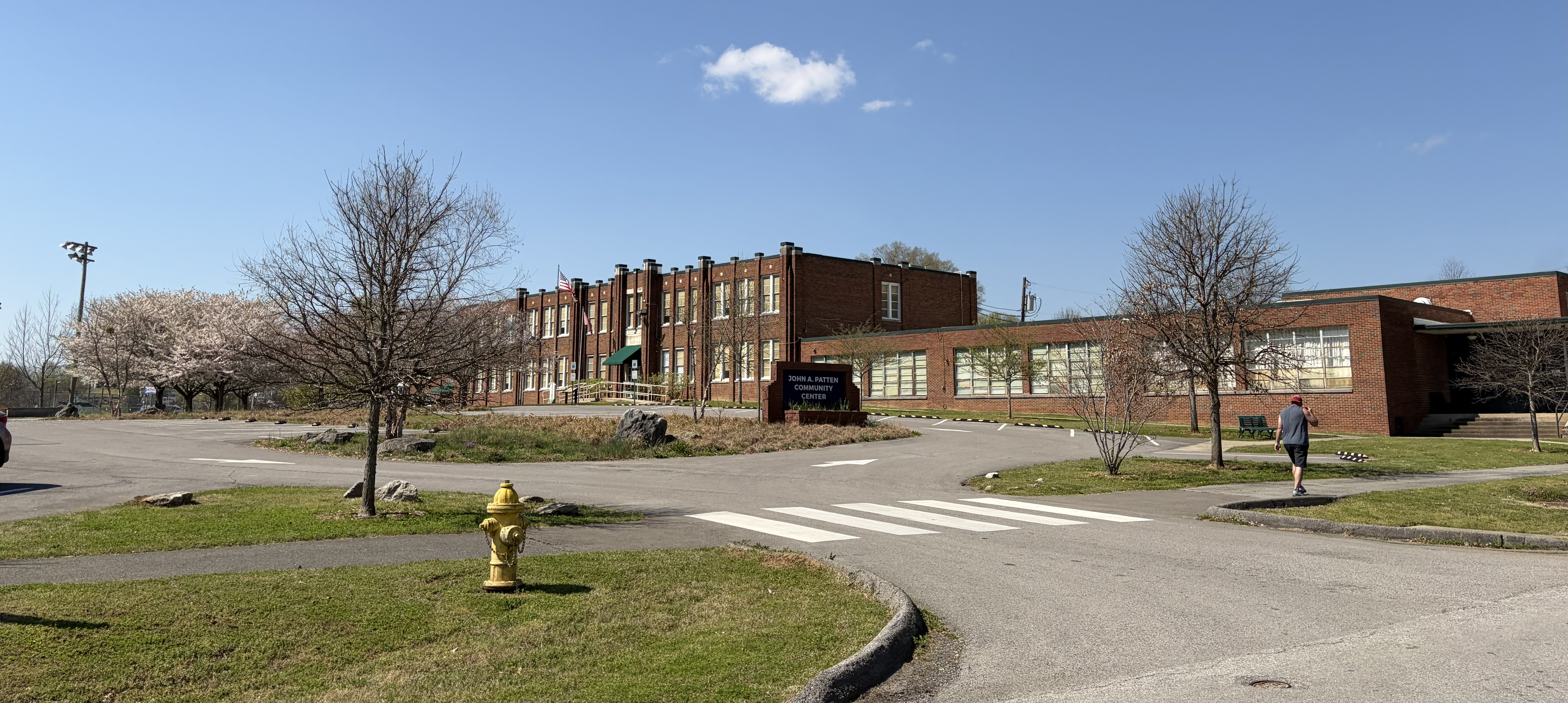
- The John A. Patten Community Center in Tiftonia
- Nickname: Lookout Valley
- Interactive map of Tiftonia
- Country: United States
- State: Tennessee
- County: Hamilton
- City: Chattanooga

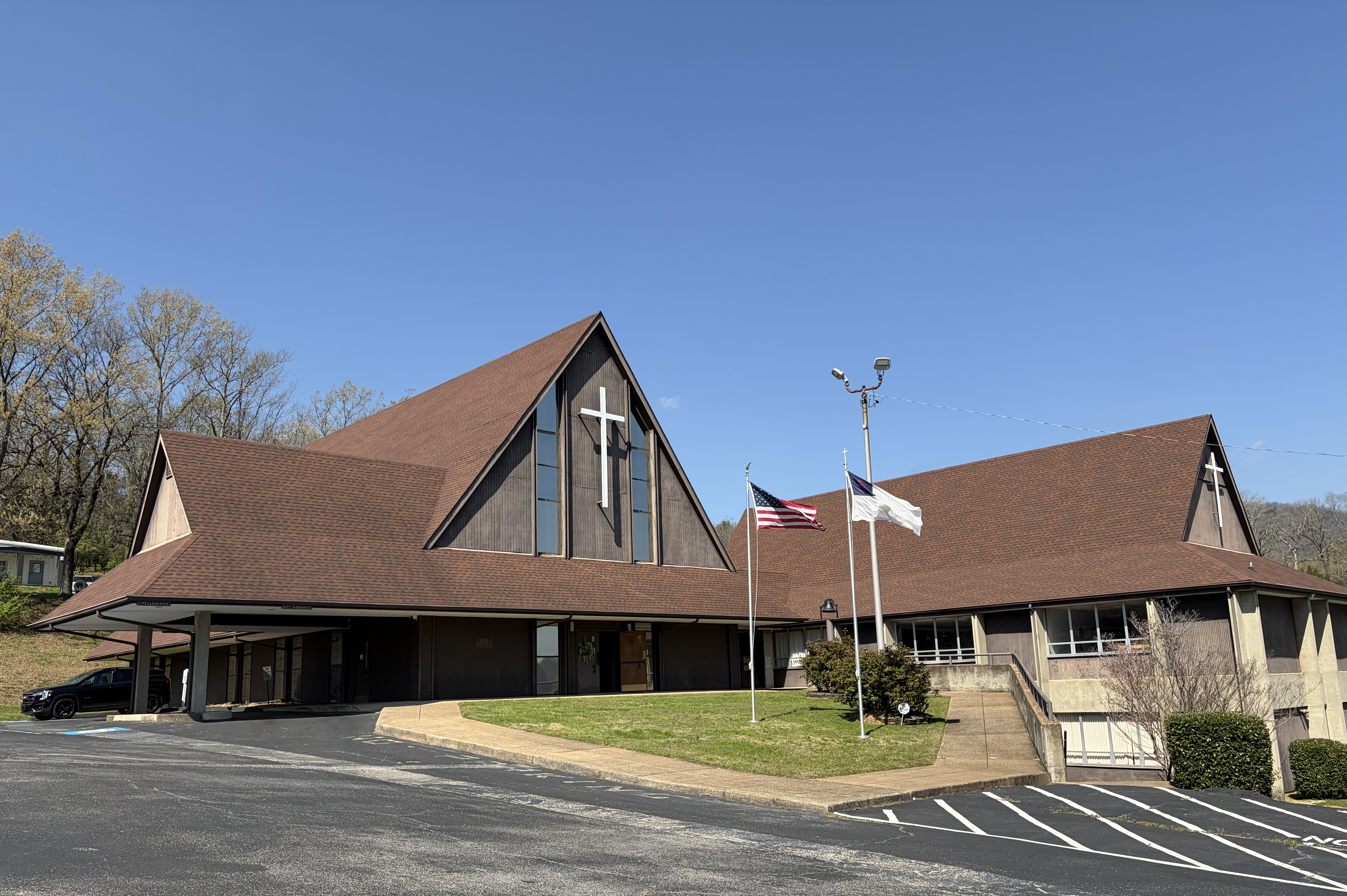
Wauhachie Methodist Church (GMC) in the Tiftonia area

Tiftonia (Lookout Valley) is a neighborhood of Chattanooga, Tennessee and a former unincorporated community in Hamilton County, Tennessee. It is located in the western portion of the city along Interstate 24 and US Routes 11, 41, 64, and 72.

Lookout Valley is the oldest part of Hamilton County, having been established in the late 1790s and early 1800s. In fact, the oldest house in Hamilton County is located within the community, that of John Brown's Ferry Tavern.

== Education ==
Schools in Tiftonia/Lookout Valley are a part of Hamilton County Schools:

- Lookout Valley Elementary
- Lookout Valley Middle and High School
