= Delano, Tennessee =

- Unincorporated community
- Location within Tennessee Location within the United States
- Coordinates: 35°15′54″N 84°33′12″W
- Country: United States
- State: Tennessee
- County: Polk, McMinn

Area
  - Total: 3.92 sq mi (10.15 km^{2})
  - Land: 3.83 sq mi (9.92 km^{2})
  - Water: 0.085 sq mi (0.22 km^{2})
- Elevation: 784 ft (239 m)

Population (2020)
  - Total: 777
  - Density: 202.8/sq mi (78.32/km^{2})
- Time zone: UTC-5 (Eastern (EST))
  - Summer (DST): UTC-4 (EDT)
- ZIP code: 37325
- Area code: 423
- GNIS feature ID: 1328046

Delano is an unincorporated community in Polk and McMinn counties in the state of Tennessee . It is located near the junction of U.S. Route 411, Tennessee State Route 30 and Tennessee State Route 163 4.3 miles (6.9 km) south-southwest of Etowah. Delano has a post office with ZIP code 37325, which opened on August 14, 1909.

Delano is home to an Old Order Mennonite community, that operates a popular produce market. The Mennonites are under the oversight of Noah Hoover Old Order Mennonites of Scottsville, Kentucky.

== Demographics ==
Historical population
Census	Pop.	Note	%±
2020	777		—
U.S. Decennial Census
