= Tennessee State Route 74 =

Highway in Tennessee

State Route 74
- SR 74 mainline in red

Route information
- Maintained by TDOT
- Length: 17.4 mi (28.0 km)
- Existed: October 1, 1923–present

Major junctions
- South end: SR 225 at the Georgia state line near Tennga, GA
- US 64 Byp. / US 74 (APD-40) in Cleveland; SR 60 in Cleveland; US 11 / US 64 / SR 312 in Cleveland
- North end: US 11 in Cleveland

Location
- Country: United States
- State: Tennessee
- Counties: Polk, Bradley

Highway system
- Tennessee State Routes; Interstate; US; State
← US 74	→ I-75

State Route 74 (SR 74) is a north–south state highway located primarily in Bradley County, Tennessee. It runs from the Georgia state line to downtown Cleveland. The route serves as a major shortcut, along with SR 60, for Cleveland citizens to commute to Atlanta, Georgia.

The section of SR 74 from its southern terminus to US 64 in Cleveland is a signed secondary highway, with the rest of the route to its northern terminus an unsigned primary highway.

== Route description ==
SR 74 begins at the Tennessee–Georgia state line and runs along the Bradley–Polk county line as Spring Place Road, continuing into Murray County as Georgia State Route 225. The route takes its name from Spring Place, an unincorporated community in Murray County on GA 225. The route immediately crosses the Conasauga River Basin and the Conasauga River, then veers to the northeast approximately one-half mile (800 m) later, completely into Bradley County. The route travels for approximately eight miles (13 km), passing through primarily farmland and woodland, crossing several ridges and valleys. The route then comes to an intersection with SR 313, which continues southeast to Oldfort, and enters the community of Wildwood Lake. The route continues for another 2.75 miles (4.43 km) and comes to an interchange with APD-40 (US-64 Bypass/US 74/SR 311), and enters the city limits of Cleveland. The route continues for approximately one mile (1.6 km) through East Cleveland, and comes to an intersection with SR 60 (Dalton Pike), and the route turns right, continuing north as Wildwood Avenue. Approximately 1.25 miles (2.01 km) later the route comes to an intersection with US 64. Most maps show the route as ending here, but the Tennessee Department of Transportation (TDOT) lists the route as continuing along concurrently with US 11 (Ocoee Street) through downtown Cleveland up to its split with the US 11 Bypass (Keith Street) in northern Cleveland.

== History ==
The current SR 74 is the third state route in Tennessee to bear this designation. The first designation was one of the original 78 state highways established on October 1, 1923, and ran between SR 24 in Algood southeast to SR 1 in Cookeville. Around 1925 or 1926, it was extended southeast to Crossville. In 1927 or 1928, this SR 74 was renumbered as part of SR 42. The second iteration of SR 74 was established in 1927 or 1928 between SR 39 (now US 411/SR 33) in Ocoee to the North Carolina line east of Ducktown. In 1933, US 64 was added to this routing, and the following year, the SR 74 designation was extended west along this route to Cleveland, and slightly rerouted. This route was further slightly rerouted in 1938, and renumbered SR 40 in 1941. The present-day SR 74 was established around 1949 or 1950, between the Georgia state line and US 64 in Cleveland. On July 1, 1983, as part of the highway renumbering and state takeover that year, SR 74 was extended along US 11 from downtown Cleveland to the intersection with the US 11 Bypass, replacing SR 2; SR 2 was rerouted onto the bypass, replacing SR 2 Bypass.

Between early 2012 and late 2013, TDOT rebuilt the bridges over the Conasauga River and Basin, closing the route for several miles.

== Major intersections ==
County	Location	mi	km	Destinations	Notes
Polk–Bradley county line		0.0	0.0	SR 225 south – Chatsworth	Georgia state line; southern terminus; SR 74 begins as a signed secondary highway
Bradley	Wildwood Lake			SR 313 east (Ladd Springs Road) – Old Fort	Western terminus of SR 313
Bradley	East Cleveland			US 64 Byp. / US 74 (APD-40/SR 311)	Interchange; beltway around the eastern side of Cleveland
Bradley	Cleveland			SR 60 south (Dalton Pike) – Dalton, GA	Southern end of SR 60 concurrency
Bradley	Cleveland			US 64 east / SR 60 north (Inman Street/SR 40 east) to US 64 Byp. / US 74 – Ocoee	Southern end of US 64/SR 40 concurrency; northern end of SR 60 concurrency; SR 74 becomes an unsigned primary highway
Bradley	Cleveland			US 11 south / US 64 west (S Broad Street/S Ocoee Street/SR 40 west) / SR 312 west (Inman Street) – Ooltewah, Birchwood	US 11 south/US 64 west follow one-way pair; southern end of US 11 concurrency; northern end of US 64/SR 40 concurrency; eastern terminus of SR 312; US 11/SR 74 follow Broad Street/Ocoee Street one-way pair north
Bradley	Cleveland			SR 60 (25th Street/APD-40) to I-75	Northern terminus of APD-40
Bradley	Cleveland	17.4	28.0	US 11 Byp. south / US 11 north (Keith Street/SR 2) – Ooltewah, Charleston, Calhoun	Partial interchange; northern terminus of US 11 Bypass and SR 74; SR 74 ends as an unsigned primary highway
1.000 mi = 1.609 km; 1.000 km = 0.621 mi: Concurrency terminus
