= Tennessee State Route 313 =

Highway in Tennessee

State Route 313
- Ladd Springs Road
- SR 313 highlighted in red

Route information
- Maintained by TDOT
- Length: 7.7 mi (12.4 km)
- Existed: July 1, 1983–present

Major junctions
- East end: US 411 in Old Fort
- West end: SR 74 in Wildwood Lake

Location
- Country: United States
- State: Tennessee
- Counties: Bradley, Polk

Highway system
- Tennessee State Routes; Interstate; US; State
← SR 312	→ SR 314

State Route 313 (SR 313) is a secondary state highway mostly in Bradley County but also in Polk County. Although it is signed as an east-west highway, it actually runs diagonally on a northwest-southeast axis.

== Route description ==
SR 313 is known as Ladd Springs Road its entire length. It begins at an intersection with US 411 (SR 33) in southeastern Polk County in the unincorporated community of Old Fort. About one mile (1.6 km) later it crosses into Bradley County. SR 313 continues for several miles through a rural and mostly agricultural area before reaching its terminus with SR 74 in the census designated place of Wildwood Lake. This is about four miles (6.4 km) southeast of Cleveland.

== Major intersections ==
County	Location	mi	km	Destinations	Notes
Polk	Oldfort			US 411 (SR 33) – Chatsworth, GA, Eton, GA, Ocoee, Benton	Eastern terminus
Bradley	Wildwood Lake			SR 74 (Spring Place Road) – Chatsworth, GA, Cleveland	Western terminus
1.000 mi = 1.609 km; 1.000 km = 0.621 mi
