= Tennessee State Route 312 =

State highway in Tennessee, United States

State Route 312
- SR 312 highlighted in red

Route information
- Maintained by TDOT
- Length: 26.8 mi (43.1 km)
- Existed: July 1, 1983–present

Major junctions
- East end: US 11 / US 64 in Cleveland
- US 11 Byp. in Cleveland; SR 58 in Hamilton County
- West end: SR 60 in Birchwood

Location
- Country: United States
- State: Tennessee
- Counties: Hamilton, Bradley

Highway system
- Tennessee State Routes; Interstate; US; State
← SR 311	→ SR 313

State Route 312 (SR 312) is a secondary state route in Hamilton and Bradley counties in the US state of Tennessee that runs from Birchwood to Cleveland. The route runs east and west; however, much of the route in Hamilton County runs north and south.

== Route description ==
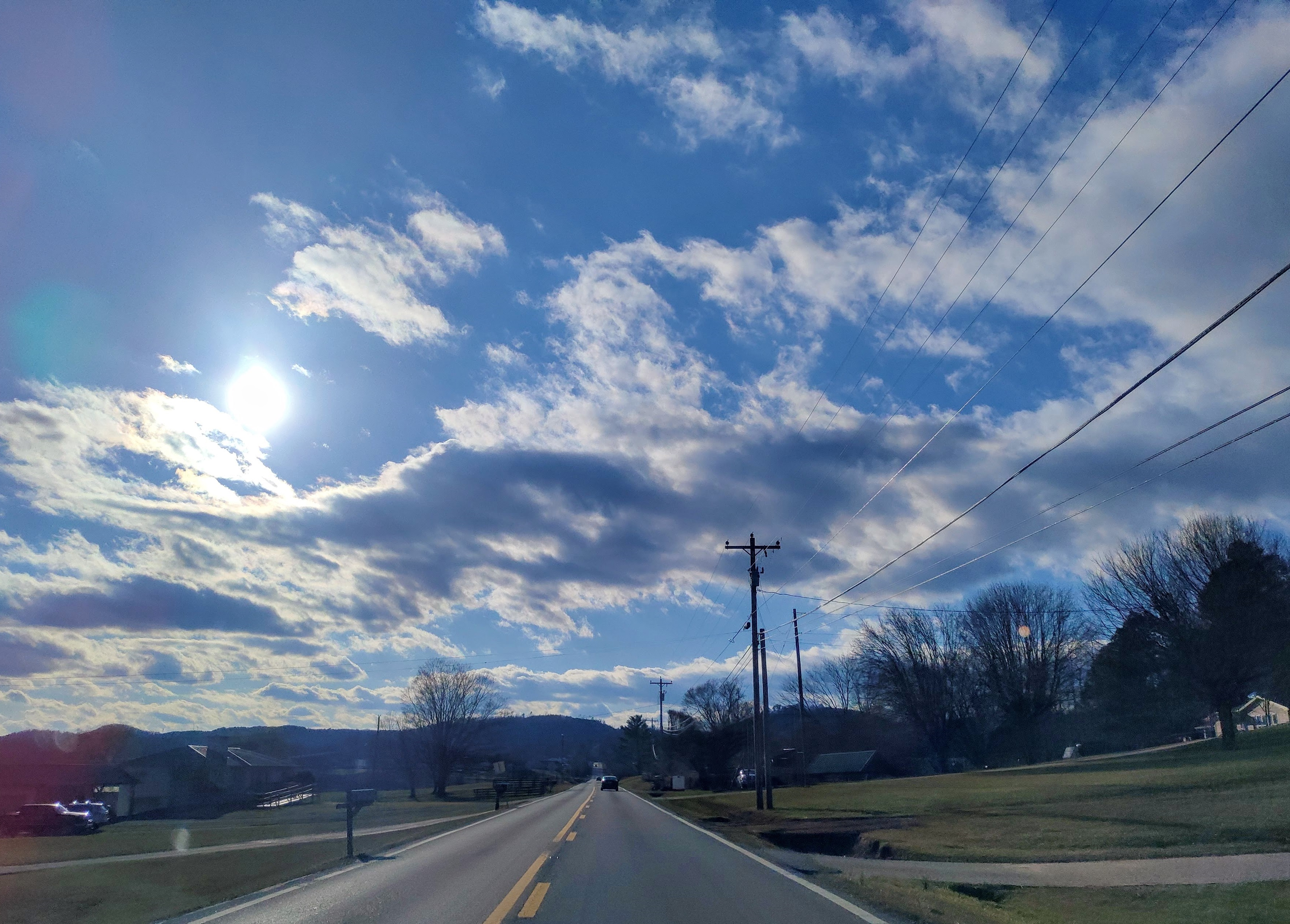
SR 312 in western Bradley County

SR 312 begins at an intersection with SR 60 in Birchwood, a small community in northeastern Hamilton County, and travels southwest for approximately 13 miles (21 km) as Birchwood Pike through rural farmland, before turning east and intersecting with SR 58 near Harrison. The route then runs north concurrently with SR 58 for about one-half mile (0.80 km), before turning east as Mahan Gap Road. The route runs through the community of Snow Hill, and about two miles (3.2 km) later comes to a four-way intersection with Ooltewah-Georgetown Road, a major connector road between the communities of Ooltewah and Georgetown. The route then crosses Mahan Gap in White Oak Mountain, and about one and a half miles (2.4 km) later crosses into Bradley County, where it becomes known as Harrison Pike. About two and a quarter miles (3.6 km) later it intersects with Bancroft Road, a connector to McDonald. The route continues for another two and a half miles (4.0 km) through a rural residential area, before turning sharp east, and entering the community of Prospect. About one and a half miles (2.4 km) later the route crosses I-75, but does not have an interchange. The route then continues for another two miles (3.2 km), crossing Candies Creek, Candies Creek Ridge in a gap, and entering Cleveland, before coming to an intersection with US 11 Bypass (Keith Street). The route continues east as Inman Street for another one-fifth mile (0.32 km) before meeting its eastern terminus with US 11/US 64 (Ocoee Street, Broad Street) in downtown Cleveland. Also at this intersection, US 64 splits off from US 11, and continues east as Inman Street.

== Major intersections ==
County	Location	mi	km	Destinations	Notes
Bradley	Cleveland	26.8	43.1	US 11 / US 64 (Ocoee Street/Broad Street/Inman Street/SR 40/SR 74) – Chattanooga, Athens, Ocoee	Eastern Terminus
Bradley	Cleveland			US 11 Byp. (Keith Street/SR 2) – Cleveland	
Hamilton	Snow Hill			SR 58 north – Georgetown, Decatur	Eastern end of SR 58 concurrency
Hamilton	Snow Hill			SR 58 south – Chattanooga	Western end of SR 58 concurrency
Hamilton	Birchwood	0.0	0.0	SR 60 – Cleveland, Georgetown, Dayton	Western terminus
1.000 mi = 1.609 km; 1.000 km = 0.621 mi: Concurrency terminus
