= Candies Creek Ridge =

Geographical feature in Tennessee and Georgia, United States

Coordinates: 35.224°N 84.869°W

Candies Creek Ridge, also known (more commonly in the past) as Clingan Ridge, is a geographic feature ridge located primarily in Bradley County, Tennessee, on the southeastern border of the state. It overlooks Candies Creek and is in north Cleveland, Tennessee.

Found here in 1996 was a large South Appalachian Mississippian culture village, built about 1000–1200 CE. It is unusual in this location, because Mississippian villages were typically found in the bottomlands along rivers and creeks. The 5-acre site was acquired for preservation by The Archeological Conservancy in 2001 and is known as the Jim Sharp Archeological Preserve.

== Geography ==
The ridge, one of a series of parallel ridges that are a continuation of the Ridge-and-Valley Appalachians, is one of the tallest, averaging approximately 997 feet (304 meters) of elevation. The highest point, in Cleveland, Tennessee, is 1,014 feet (309 meters). It is also known as Lebanon Ridge south of Cleveland. The ridge stretches from Tunnel Hill, Georgia to the lower Hiwassee River at the Bradley/McMinn County line in Tennessee.

Several highways cross the formation, including (from south to north) GA SR 2, TN SR 317, APD-40, US 11/US 64, SR 312, Interstate 75 and SR 60 (together), Paul Huff Parkway, and SR 308.

To the west is a ridge usually referred to in Tennessee as Mount Zion Ridge, and in the valley between the ridges in Tennessee is Candies Creek. To the east is a ridge referred to in northern Bradley County as Mouse Creek Ridge, and in the valley between is South Mouse Creek. This ridge is called Lead Mine Ridge in the southern part of the Bradley County and in Georgia.

== History ==
As was the case throughout the river and creek valleys in the Southeast, this area for thousands of years was settled by indigenous cultures. In 1996 a team of archeologists were consulted to investigate possible Cherokee graves at a subdivision development site a few miles west of Candies Creek Ridge. They discovered a large South Appalachian Mississippian culture village, which has been dated to 1000–1200 CE. Architectural remains included a defensive palisade. Archeologists said it was unusual to find such a large Mississippian site in the uplands, as they were more typically developed in bottomlands along rivers.

The Archeological Conservancy bought the site from the developer, who offered it at less than market, recognizing its historic significance. (This transaction was approved by both the Eastern Band of Cherokee Indians and the Cherokee Nation.) Additional work at the site has found a variety of artifacts, another Mississippian palisade, some human burials, and trade goods associated with the historic Cherokee. After surveying and mapping, the researchers left most of the features and artifacts undisturbed in the ground, to allow opportunity for future studies. The federally recognized Cherokee tribes arranged for reconsecrating the human burials. The site is now named the Jim Sharp Archeological Preserve, for the man who sold the property to the Conservancy.

The historic Cherokee referred to the creek in the valley west of the ridge in Bradley County as Little Kiuka Creek. Their village nearby overlooked the confluence of two creeks.

=== 19th century to present ===
The waterway was later named by European Americans as Candy's Creek (today is known as Candies Creek) for Henry Candy, who settled along the creek around 1817, after the Cherokee had ceded their land north of the Hiwassee River to the United States.

A historical marker once stood along State Route 60 near the location of the Candy's Creek Cherokee Mission Station

The Candy's Creek Cherokee Indian Mission Station, organized in 1824 by Samuel Worcester and five others, was built near their historic village by the creek. Today the intersection of SR 60 and Paul Huff Parkway are south of this former site. The station closed in 1838 after Cherokee Removal; it was notable as the first organized church and post office in Bradley County. The building also contained a school.

A historical marker commemorating the mission station was installed near the historic site along SR 60 in 1959 near the present-day intersection of Paul Huff Parkway. It disappeared, reportedly around the time Paul Huff Parkway was constructed. Candy's Creek Cherokee Elementary, a new school in North Cleveland that opened here in August 2019, was named for the mission station.

In Bradley County, the ridge is named for the Clingan family, who lived on it in what is now northern Cleveland. A.A. Clingan, one of the family members, was Bradley County's first elected sheriff, serving from 1837 to 1838 and 1840 to 1846. The family of his wife, Martha Blythe, founded Blythe Ferry on the south side of the Tennessee River in Meigs County, Tennessee, in 1809. The Clingan family cemetery, located on the western foot of the ridge off SR 60, was rediscovered in 2014 and restored in 2016.

== Counties ==
GA

- Catoosa County
- Whitfield County

TN

- Bradley County
- Hamilton County

== Cities and communities ==
- Cleveland, Tennessee
- McDonald, Tennessee
- Tunnel Hill, Georgia
