= Appalachian Highway =

Appalachian Highway may refer to:

- Appalachian Development Highway System
- Ohio State Route 32
- APD-40
- Appalachian Highway (auto trail)
