= Tri-County Veterans Bridge =

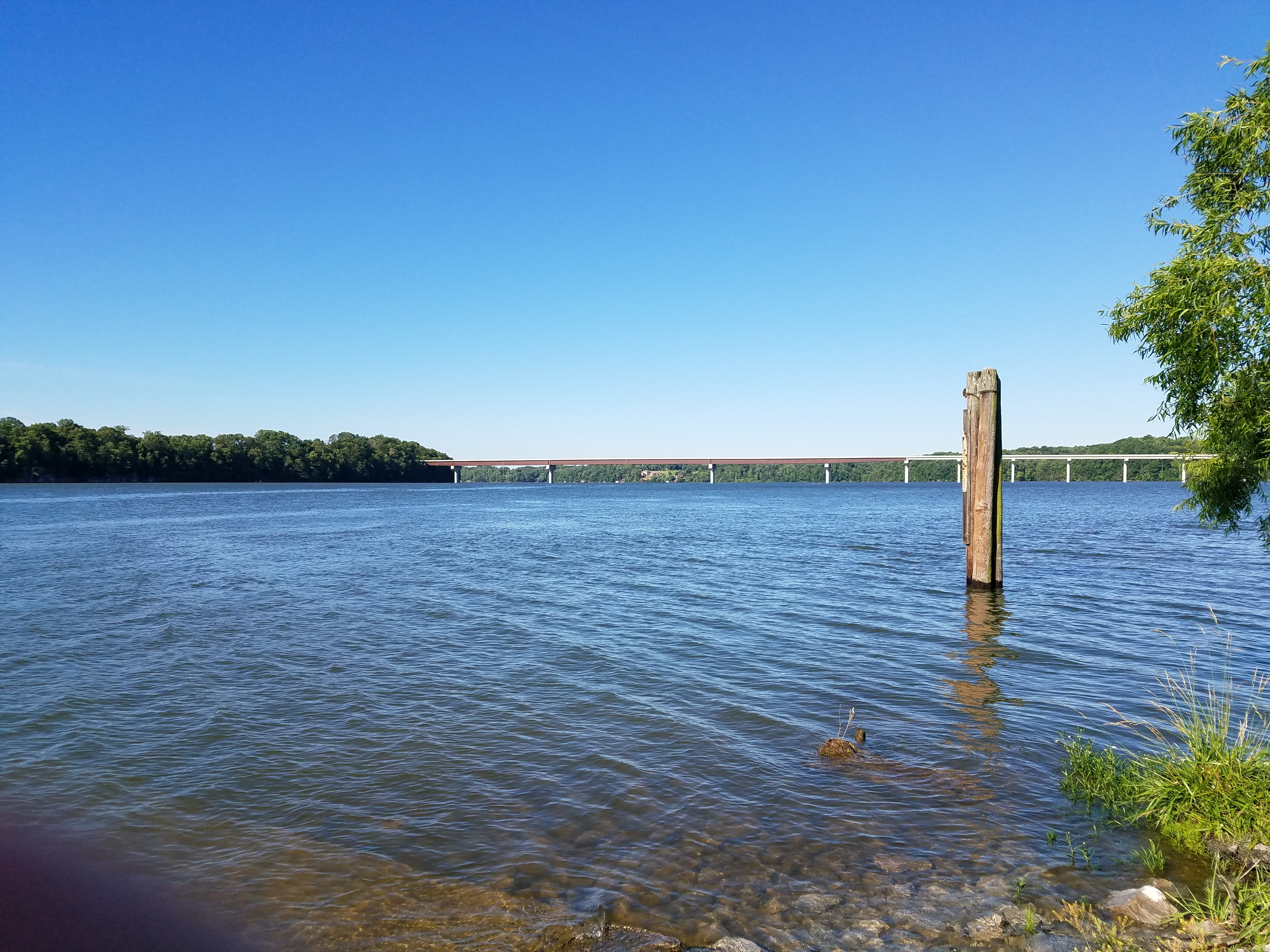
- View of the Tri-County Veterans Bridge from the western approach to Blythe Ferry
- Coordinates: 35°24′41″N 85°01′12″W
- Carries: 2 lanes of SR 60
- Crosses: Tennessee River
- Locale: Hamilton, Meigs, and Rhea County, Tennessee

Characteristics
- Design: Girder bridge
- Total length: 3,174 feet (967 m)
- Width: 50 feet (15 m)

History
- Construction start: September 21, 1993
- Construction end: March 1995
- Opened: July 3, 1995

Location
- Interactive map of Tri-County Veterans Bridge

The Tri-County Veterans Bridge, also known as the Blythe Ferry Bridge, carries Tennessee State Route 60 (SR 60) over Chickamauga Lake on the Tennessee River. It connects Meigs and Rhea counties just north of Hamilton County. It is located just south of the confluence of the Tennessee and Hiwassee River as well as Hiwassee Island near descending river mile 500. The two-lane bridge is 3,174 feet (967 m) long. It's substructure consists of both steel girders and prestressed concrete beams.

It replaced Blythe Ferry, a ferry across the Tennessee River which began operations in 1809. Construction of the $11.2-million (equivalent to $21 million in 2024) bridge began on September 21, 1993. Work was completed in March 1995, but the approaches, which cost $5.5 million (equivalent to $10.3 million in 2024), were not yet complete. The bridge opened to traffic on July 3, 1995, and it was dedicated by then-Tennessee Governor Don Sundquist and other officials on September 12, 1995.

== See also ==
- List of crossings of the Tennessee River
