= Tennessee State Route 60 =

Highway in Tennessee

State Route 60
- Dalton Pike, APD-40, 25th Street, Georgetown Road, Hiwassee Highway
- SR 60; primary in red, secondary in blue

Route information
- Maintained by TDOT
- Length: 54.04 mi (86.97 km)
- Existed: October 1, 1923–present

Major junctions
- South end: SR 71 at the Georgia State Line near Cohutta, GA
- US 64 Byp. in Cleveland; US 64 / US 74 in Cleveland; US 11 / SR 74 in Cleveland; I-75 in Cleveland; SR 58 in Georgetown
- North end: US 27 / SR 378 in Dayton

Location
- Country: United States
- State: Tennessee
- Counties: Bradley, Hamilton, Meigs, Rhea

Highway system
- Tennessee State Routes; Interstate; US; State
← SR 59	→ US 61

State Route 60 (SR 60) is a north-south major state route in East Tennessee. It covers 54 miles (87 km) and runs from the Tennessee-Georgia state line in Bradley County to Dayton joining US 27.

== Route description ==
=== Bradley County ===
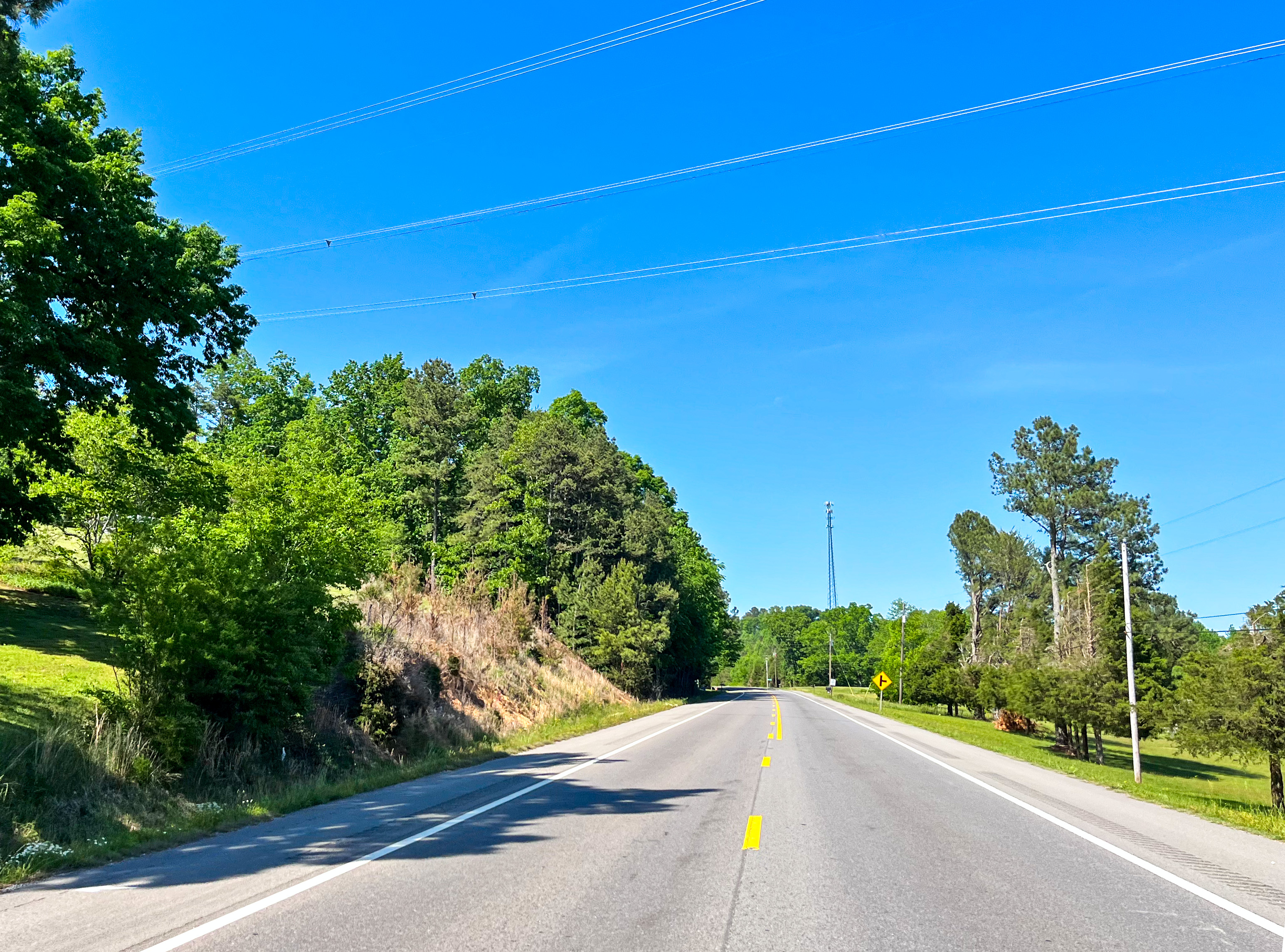
SR 60 just north of Georgia border

SR 60 begins at the Georgia border in Bradley County, heading north on two-lane Dalton Pike, a primary state route. At the state line, the route continues into Whitfield County, Georgia as SR 71 (Cleveland Highway) to Dalton. From the border, SR 60 passes a mix of hilly farmland and woodland as it reaches a junction with SR 317 (Weatherly Switch Road). The route continues through the agricultural valley, entering the community of Waterville, where it widens to five lanes, including a two-way left turn lane. Continuing northeast, the road enters Cleveland and passes residential development as it turns to the north. SR 60 heads into commercial areas and intersection with McGrady Drive, a connector to APD-40 (US 64 Bypass/US 74, SR 311), where it reduces back to two lanes. The road heads northwest into residential areas, turning north into business areas, and intersects SR 74 (Spring Place Road S.E.). TDOT lists the route as turning southeast to form a concurrency with SR 74, but it is signed on some maps as continuing north with SR 74 at this intersection along Wildwood Avenue SE. and then east with US 64 to the interchange with APD-40.

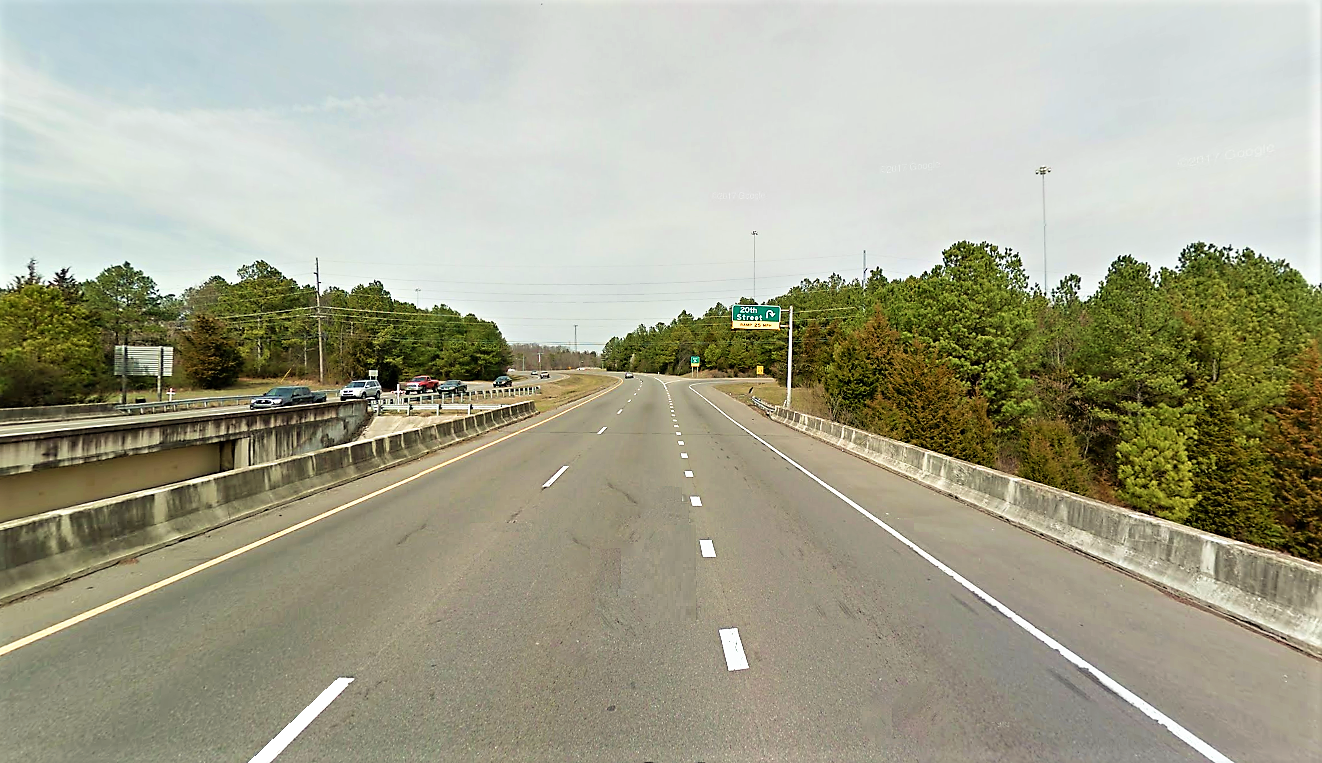
SR 60 as part of APD-40 near the interchange with 20th Street NE.

A short distance later, SR 60 splits from SR 74 by heading north along APD-40 as part of the four-lane divided and limited-access highway, becoming a primary route again. The road passes through wooded areas near some residential development, bypassing Cleveland to the east. Upon reaching a cloverleaf interchange with US 64/US 74 (SR 40), US 64 Bypass terminates and SR 60 continues north as a freeway. The route comes to an interchange with Benton Pike before coming to the Overhead Bridge Road exit, at which point the freeway temporarily gains auxiliary lanes. SR 60 passes over Norfolk Southern's Knoxville District West End railroad line and interchanges with 20th Street NE, where the auxiliary lanes terminate, making a turn to the northwest. The road then enters the metropolis of Cleveland, passing developed areas of homes and businesses as it becomes a surface road again. Here the APD-40 designation ends and the route becomes known as 25th Street. SR 60 comes to intersections with US 11 (SR 74, Ocoee Street) and US 11 Bypass (SR 2, Keith Street) in this area. The road passes through a patch of woods before passing more commercial establishments as it comes to the I-75 interchange.

At this point, SR 60 turns north and becomes Georgetown Road, a secondary route that passes through residential areas, where it gains a two-way left turn lane once again. The route comes to an intersection with Paul Huff Parkway, and leaves Cleveland, heading into a mix of farmland and woodland before passing near more residential and commercial areas as it comes to the SR 306 junction in Hopewell. Following this, the road immediately narrows back to two lanes and continues northwest through forested areas with some farm fields and residences. SR 60 continues into more agricultural areas before it travels along the border between Meigs County to the northeast and Hamilton County to the southwest.

=== Hamilton and Meigs Counties ===
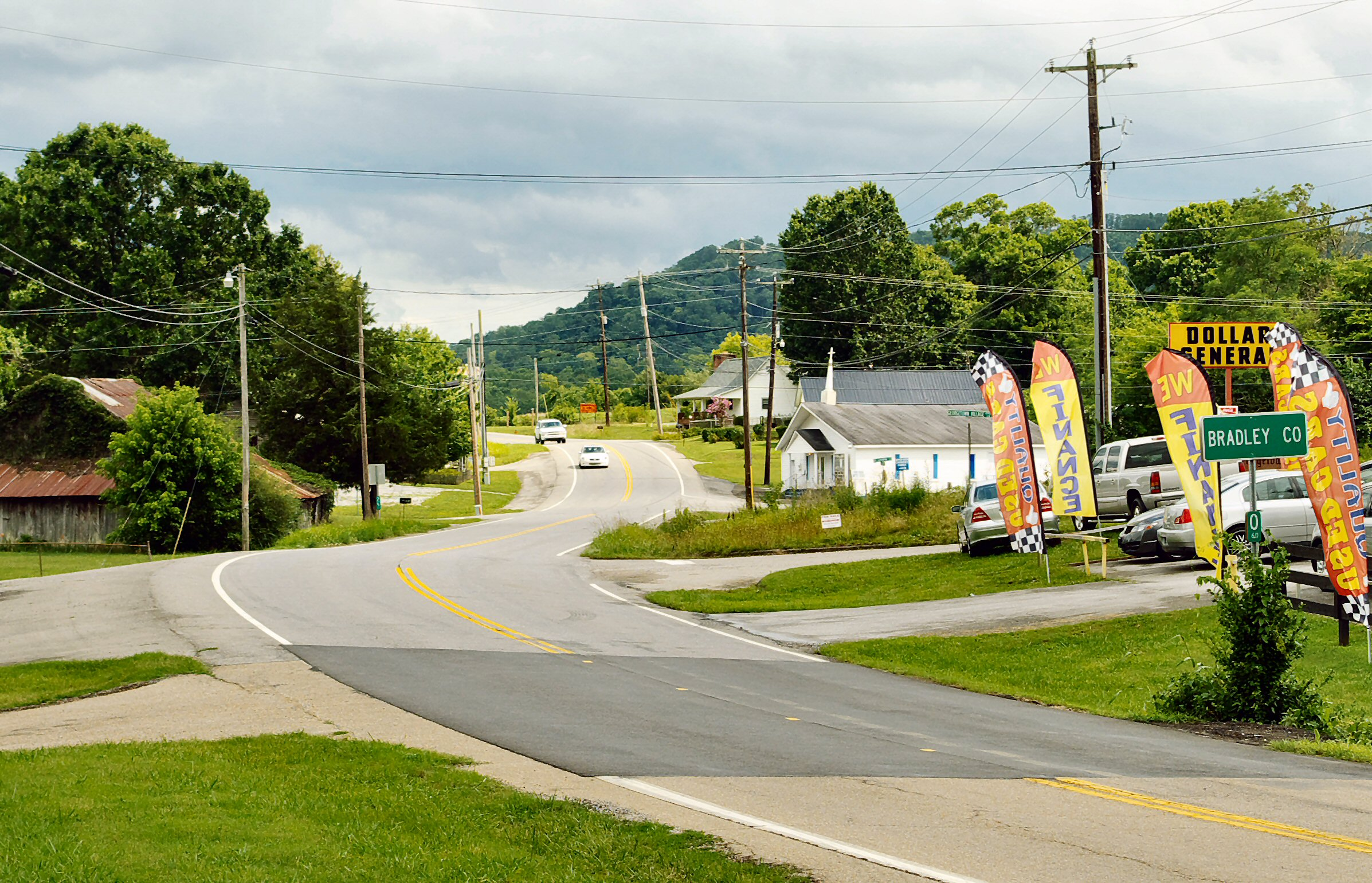
SR 60 in Georgetown at the Bradley-Hamilton-Meigs County line.

The route passes through Georgetown, where it passes a few residences and businesses. A short distance past Georgetown, SR 60 crosses onto the Hamilton-Meigs County line, passing through more rural areas as an unnamed road and comes to a junction with SR 58. The road passes through more agricultural and wooded areas, turning to the north and entering more forested surroundings. After a turn to the northwest, the route continues through wooded areas with a few farm fields fully within Hamilton County, reaching an intersection with the northern terminus of SR 312 (Birchwood Pike). At this point, SR 60 turns north again and passes through the residential community of Birchwood. From here, the road becomes Hiwassee Highway and curves northwest into farmland with some woods and homes, crossing into Meigs County and becoming straighter.

=== Rhea County ===
Upon crossing the Tennessee River on the Tri-County Veterans Bridge, SR 60 enters Rhea County and turns north into forested areas with a few farms. The road continues to wind through rural areas with some residential development before SR 60 reaches its northern terminus at US 27 (SR 29) in Dayton. On the opposite side of this intersection is the southern terminus of SR 378, which runs through downtown Dayton.

== History ==
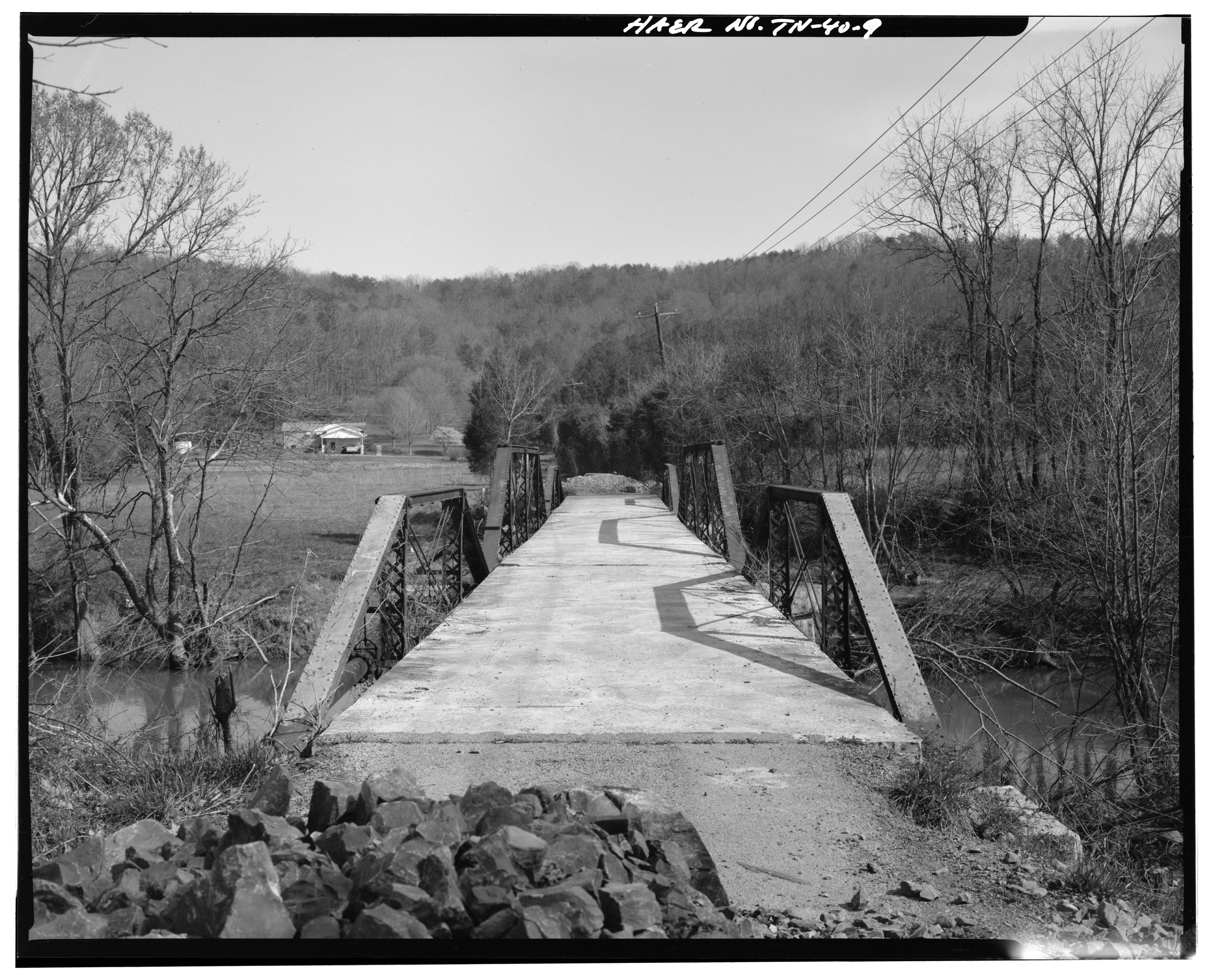
The Lea Bridge, which carried SR 60 across Candies Creek until being rerouted in 1948.

When the first state routes in Tennessee were established on October 1, 1923, State Route 60 was assigned to a road called Benton Pike that runs between Cleveland and Benton in Polk County to the east. In 1927 or 1928, SR 60 was extended from Cleveland along Dalton Pike to the Georgia state line. Around the same time, the road between Cleveland and SR 58 in Georgetown was designated as SR 83. In 1939, SR 60 was rerouted from Benton Pike to replace SR 83 and Benton Pike was removed from the state highway system. In 1951, SR 60 was extended to US 27 in Dayton. This segment used Blythe Ferry, a historic ferry across the Tennessee River that was established in 1809. The Tri-County Veterans bridge was built immediately downstream of the ferry between October 1993 and June 1995, and the ferry ceased operations the following month. The bridge was dedicated by then-Tennessee Governor Don Sundquist on September 12, 1995. The east landing of the ferry is now part of Cherokee Trail of Tears State Park.

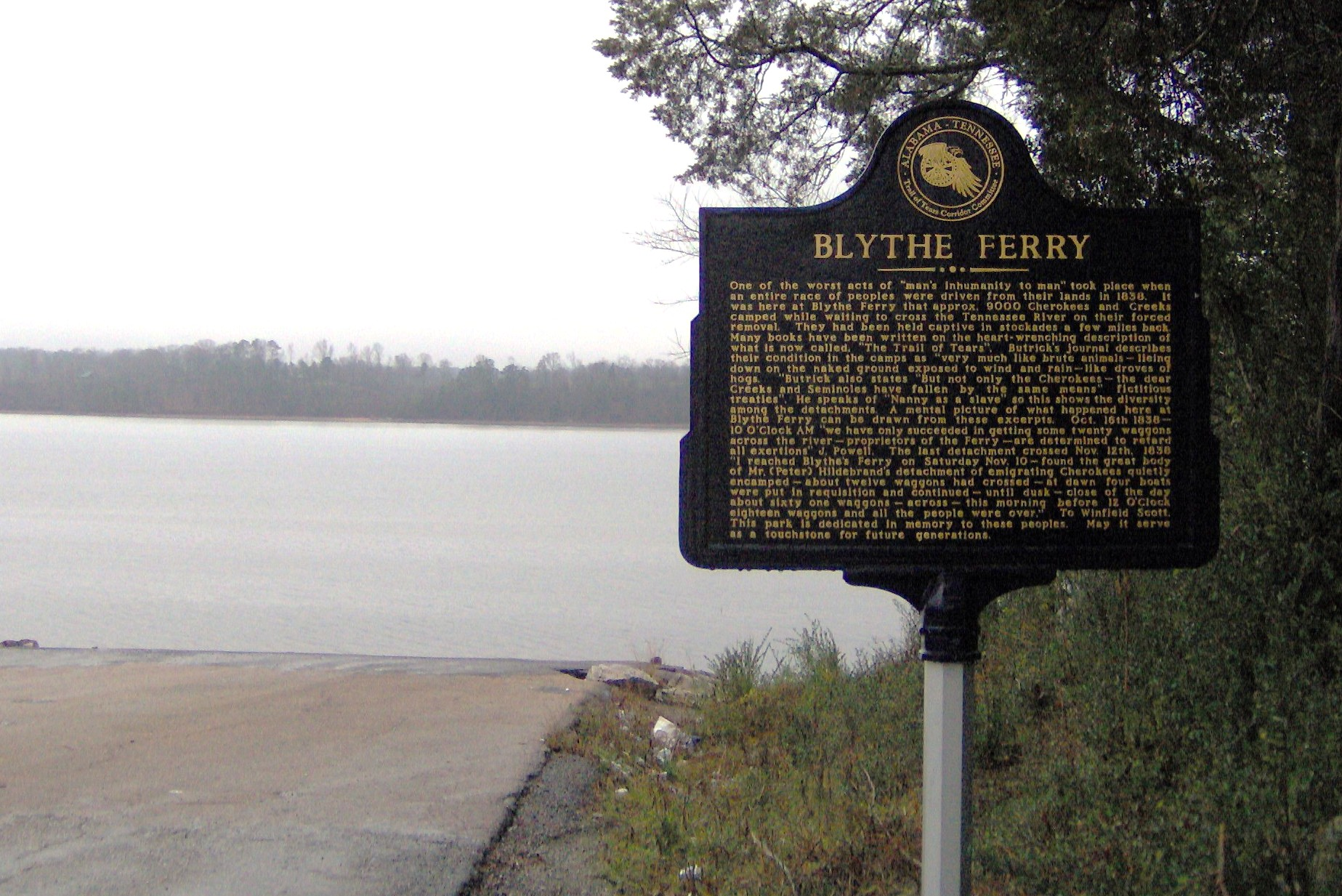
Historical marker at Blythe Ferry

In 1948, a new straighter alignment was constructed between Cleveland and Hopewell, including a new bridge over Candies Creek that replaced the one-lane Lea Bridge built in 1886. This bridge, however, remained until 1988 when it was replaced. In Cleveland, the route originally turned south about 1/4 mile (0.40 km) east of the interchange with I-75 onto a road which is still called Georgetown Road, and briefly ran together with US 64 through downtown Cleveland before splitting off onto Wildwood Avenue. It was moved onto 25th Street and a concurrency with the US 11 Bypass (Keith Street) into downtown Cleveland after a new four-lane alignment was constructed between I-75 and the US 11 Bypass in the mid-1960s. In the fall of 1969, work was completed on the widening of 25th Street between the US 11 Bypass and US 11 to four lanes, which was still a city-maintained street at the time. SR 60 was relocated onto the section between US 11 Bypass and US 64 after that section of APD-40 was completed in 1975. The APD-40 section was originally referred to as SR 60 Bypass during the planning and construction phase.

Between early 2010 and early 2013, the section of SR 60 (Dalton Pike) south of the intersection with McGrady Drive through the Waterville community was widened to five lanes and straightened out. The original route was a hazardous two-lane road with several dangerous curves prone to accidents.

In 2016, the parallel bridges on APD-40 across 20th Street, the railroad, and Overhead Bridge Road were designated as the Dustin Ledford Memorial Bridge in honor of a man who was killed by an intoxicated driver near the Overhead Bridge Road exit.

In September 2017, TDOT began the process of right-of-way acquisition to widen the segment of SR 60 (Georgetown Road) between north of I-75 and SR 306 from two to five lanes. After years of delays, the project broke ground on October 14, 2021, with completion initially expected on August 25, 2025. On July 15, 2025, a ribbon cutting ceremony was held to celebrate the substantial completion of the project, although final work was not finished for many more weeks.

== Major intersections ==
County	Location	mi	km	Destinations	Notes
Bradley		0.00	0.00	SR 71 south (Cleveland Highway) – Dalton	Georgia state line; southern terminus; SR 60 begins as a primary route
Bradley				SR 317 west (Weatherley Switch Road SE) – Apison, Collegedale, Ooltewah	Eastern terminus of SR 317
Bradley	Cleveland			US 64 Byp. / US 74 (APD-40/SR 311)	Interchange via access road (McGrady Drive)
Bradley	Cleveland			SR 74 south (Spring Place Road SE) – Wildwood Lake	Southern end of SR 74 concurrency
Bradley	Cleveland			US 64 west / SR 74 north (Inman Street E/SR 40 west) – Downtown	Northern end of SR 74 concurrency; southern end of US 64/SR 40 concurrency
Bradley	Cleveland			US 64 east / US 74 east (SR 40 east/Waterlevel Highway) – Ocoee US 64 Byp. west / US 74 west (APD-40/SR 311 south) – Chattanooga	Interchange; northern end of US 64/SR 40 concurrency; southern end of APD-40 concurrency; northern terminus of unsigned SR 311
Bradley	Cleveland			South end of freeway section (APD-40)	
Bradley	Cleveland			Benton Pike	
Bradley	Cleveland			Overhead Bridge Road	
Bradley	Cleveland			20th Street	
Bradley	Cleveland			North end of freeway section (APD-40)	
Bradley	Cleveland			US 11 (SR 74/North Ocoee Street) – Downtown Cleveland, Athens	Northern terminus of APD-40
Bradley	Cleveland			US 11 Byp. (SR 2 / Keith Street NW) – Chattanooga, Charleston, Calhoun, Athens	
Bradley	Cleveland			I-75 – Chattanooga, Knoxville	I-75 exit 25, SR 60 becomes secondary route
Bradley	Cleveland			Paul Huff Parkway east	Western terminus of Paul Huff Parkway
Bradley	Hopewell			SR 306 north (Eureka Road NW)	Southern terminus of SR 306
Hamilton	Georgetown			SR 58 – Decatur, Chattanooga	
Hamilton	Birchwood			SR 312 east (Birchwood Pike)	Western terminus of SR 312
Meigs	No major junctions				
Tennessee River				Tri-County Veterans Bridge over the Tennessee River	
Rhea	Dayton	54.04	86.97	US 27 (Rhea County Highway/SR 29) – Spring City, Chattanooga SR 378 north (Market Street) – Downtown	Northern terminus; Southern terminus of SR 378; SR 60 ends as a secondary route
1.000 mi = 1.609 km; 1.000 km = 0.621 mi: Concurrency terminus
