= Cherokee Trail of Tears State Park =

Memorial park in Tennessee, United States

Coordinates: 35°24′30″N 85°00′23″W

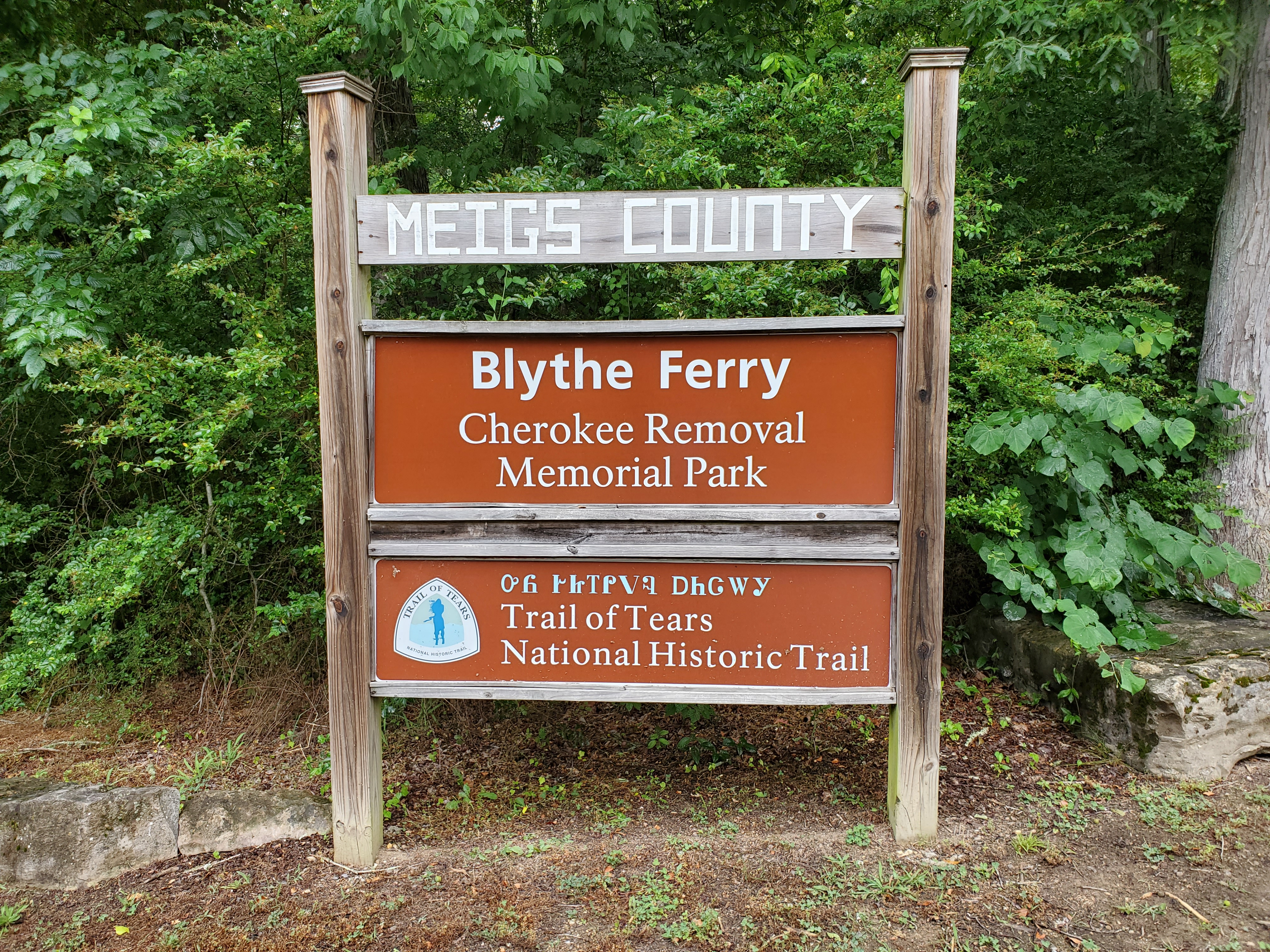
- Entrance sign at Blythe Ferry at the former Cherokee Removal Memorial Park
- Interactive map of Cherokee Trail of Tears State Park
- Type: State park
- Location: 6800 Blythe Ferry Lane, Birchwood, Tennessee 37308
- Area: 29 acres (120,000 m^{2})
- Opened: June 2, 2026; 60 days ago 2005 (as Cherokee Removal Memorial Park
- Operator: Tennessee Department of Environment and Conservation
- Open: Year round
- Website: Cherokee Trail of Tears State Park

Cherokee Trail of Tears State Park, formerly Cherokee Removal Memorial Park, is a state park in Meigs County, Tennessee, that is dedicated in memory of the Cherokee who were forced to emigrate from their ancestral lands during the Cherokee removal, in an event that came to be known as the Trail of Tears. It was established in 2005 as a local park, and became a state park in 2026.

== Background ==
Cherokee Trail of Tears State Park is located on the banks of the Chickamauga Lake reservoir of the Tennessee River near the Birchwood community, and includes the east bank of Blythe Ferry. This ferry was used to transport many of the Cherokees west on their journey to Indian Territory in present-day Oklahoma. The park is a short distance south of the mouth of the Hiwassee River and Hiwassee Island, another important historic Cherokee site. It is surrounded by Hiwassee Wildlife Refuge. The removal was headquartered at Fort Cass in nearby Charleston.

== Description and history ==
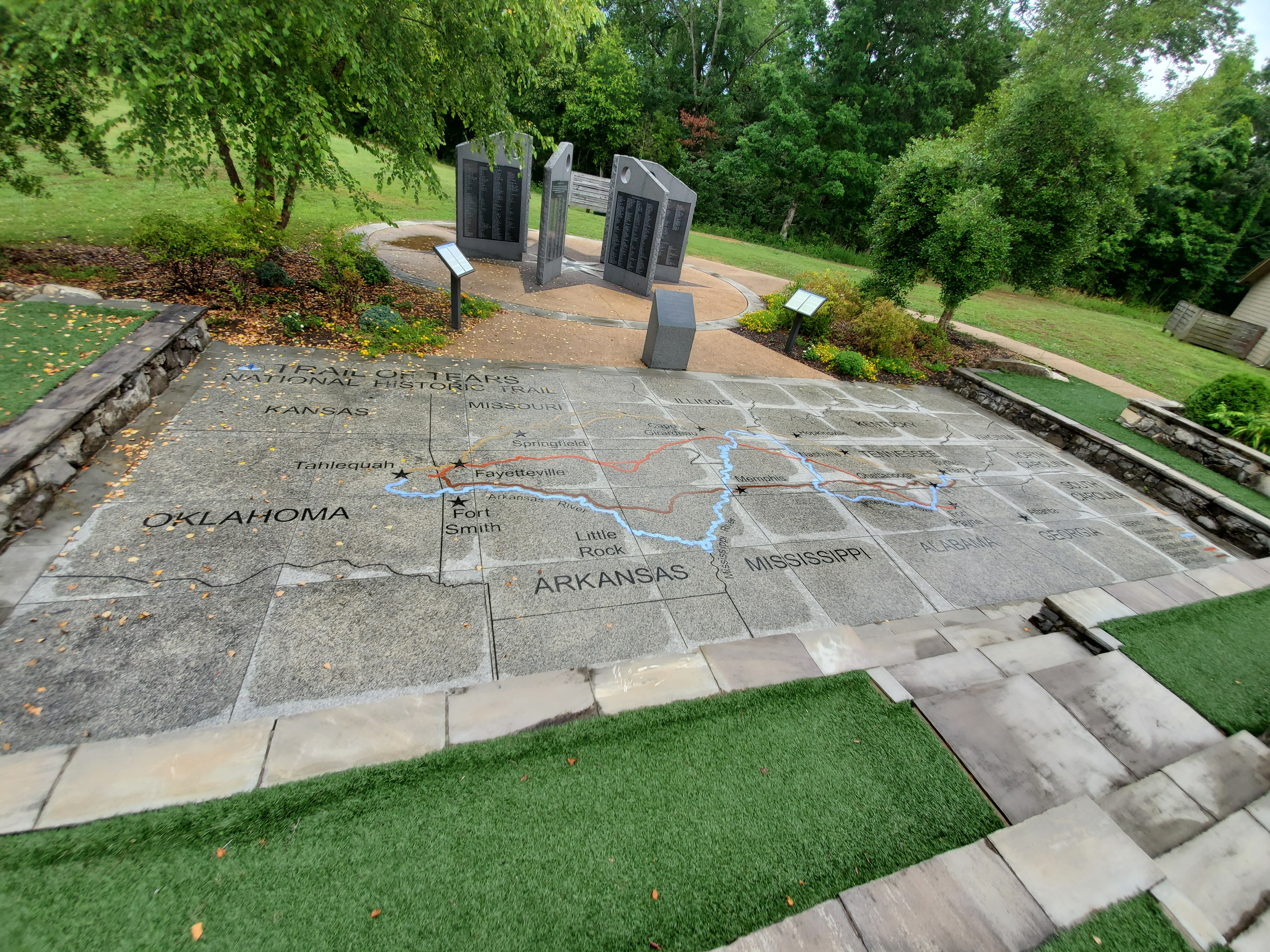
Walkway map at Cherokee Trail of Tears State Park depicting the route of the Cherokee on the Trail of Tears, June 2020

The park was established as a partnership between the government of Meigs County, Tennessee Valley Authority (TVA), Tennessee Wildlife Resources Agency (TWRA), National Park Service (NPS), and Friends of the Cherokee. It is surrounded by Hiwassee Wildlife Refuge, which is managed by the TWRA. The park is located on 29 acres (120,000 m^{2}) and consists of a visitor center containing an interpretive center, library, and presentation room; a history wall which chronicles the development of the Cherokee people; a memorial wall which identifies the names of Cherokee who were removed; and a map of the Trail of Tears carved in stone on the ground. It is listed as an interpretive center on the Trail of Tears National Historic Trail.

The park was established in 2005, with the visitor center opening in May 2009. The memorial wall was dedicated on October 27, 2013. A statue of Sam Houston honoring his relations with Native Americans was dedicated at the park on August 21, 2016, in a ceremony officated by then-Cherokee Nation Supreme Court justice Troy Poteete. On June 2, 2026, the park was established as Tennessee's 65th state park and renamed Cherokee Trail of Tears State Park in a dedication ceremony. The new name was chosen to better reflect the Cherokee people's lived experiences during the forced removal.

== See also ==
- Fort Cass
- Red Clay State Park
- Hiwassee River Heritage Center
