= Wildwood Lake, Tennessee =

- Census-designated place
- Location within the state of Tennessee
- Coordinates: 35°6′15″N 84°51′31″W
- Country: United States
- State: Tennessee
- County: Bradley

Area
  - Total: 12.05 sq mi (31.22 km^{2})
  - Land: 12.01 sq mi (31.10 km^{2})
  - Water: 0.046 sq mi (0.12 km^{2})
- Elevation: 833 ft (254 m)

Population (2020)
  - Total: 3,286
  - Density: 273.6/sq mi (105.65/km^{2})
- Time zone: UTC-5 (Eastern (EST))
  - Summer (DST): UTC-4 (EDT)
- ZIP code: 37323
- Area code: 423
- FIPS code: 47-80760
- GNIS feature ID: 1867540

Wildwood Lake is a census-designated place (CDP) in Bradley County, Tennessee, United States. The population was 3,286 at the 2020 Census. It is included in the Cleveland, Tennessee Metropolitan Statistical Area.

== Geography ==
Wildwood Lake is located at 35°6′15″N 84°51′31″W (35.104121, -84.858645).

According to the United States Census Bureau, the CDP has a total area of 12.1 square miles (31 km^{2}), of which 12.0 square miles (31 km^{2}) is land and 0.046 square miles (0.12 km^{2}), or 0.38%, is water.

Wildwood Lake is situated approximately four miles southeast of downtown Cleveland. It is bordered by State Route 60 (Dalton Pike) on the west and State Route 74 (Spring Place Road) on the east. APD-40 and State Route 313 (Ladd Springs Road) are also major connectors to the community.

== Demographics ==
Historical population
Census	Pop.	Note	%±
2010	3,124		—
2020	3,286		5.2%
U.S. Decennial Census

=== 2020 census ===
As of the 2020 census, Wildwood Lake had a population of 3,286. The median age was 40.5 years. 21.5% of residents were under the age of 18 and 17.9% of residents were 65 years of age or older. For every 100 females there were 100.7 males, and for every 100 females age 18 and over there were 99.5 males age 18 and over.

49.0% of residents lived in urban areas, while 51.0% lived in rural areas.

There were 1,265 households in Wildwood Lake, of which 26.5% had children under the age of 18 living in them. Of all households, 50.4% were married-couple households, 18.6% were households with a male householder and no spouse or partner present, and 24.4% were households with a female householder and no spouse or partner present. About 25.3% of all households were made up of individuals and 12.4% had someone living alone who was 65 years of age or older.

There were 1,368 housing units, of which 7.5% were vacant. The homeowner vacancy rate was 1.3% and the rental vacancy rate was 3.6%.

Wildwood Lake racial composition
Race	Number	Percentage
White (non-Hispanic)	2,864	87.16%
Black or African American (non-Hispanic)	25	0.76%
Native American	10	0.3%
Asian	10	0.3%
Pacific Islander	2	0.06%
Other/Mixed	164	4.99%
Hispanic or Latino	211	6.42%

=== 2000 census ===
As of the census of 2000, there were 3,050 people, 1,195 households, and 910 families residing in the CDP. The population density was 254.3 inhabitants per square mile (98.2/km^{2}). There were 1,261 housing units at an average density of 105.1 per square mile (40.6/km^{2}). The racial makeup of the CDP was 97.67% White, 0.82% African American, 0.07% Native American, 0.20% Asian, 0.59% from other races, and 0.66% from two or more races. Hispanic or Latino of any race were 0.85% of the population.

There were 1,195 households, out of which 32.1% had children under the age of 18 living with them, 63.6% were married couples living together, 8.1% had a female householder with no husband present, and 23.8% were non-families. 20.3% of all households were made up of individuals, and 8.2% had someone living alone who was 65 years of age or older. The average household size was 2.55 and the average family size was 2.91.

In the CDP, the population was spread out, with 23.6% under the age of 18, 8.6% from 18 to 24, 31.3% from 25 to 44, 24.9% from 45 to 64, and 11.5% who were 65 years of age or older. The median age was 37 years. For every 100 females, there were 100.7 males. For every 100 females age 18 and over, there were 94.7 males.

The median income for a household in the CDP was $37,708, and the median income for a family was $41,357. Males had a median income of $29,344 versus $21,484 for females. The per capita income for the CDP was $16,191. About 8.9% of families and 9.2% of the population were below the poverty line, including 15.4% of those under age 18 and 9.2% of those age 65 or over.
