= Birchwood, Tennessee =

- Unincorporated community
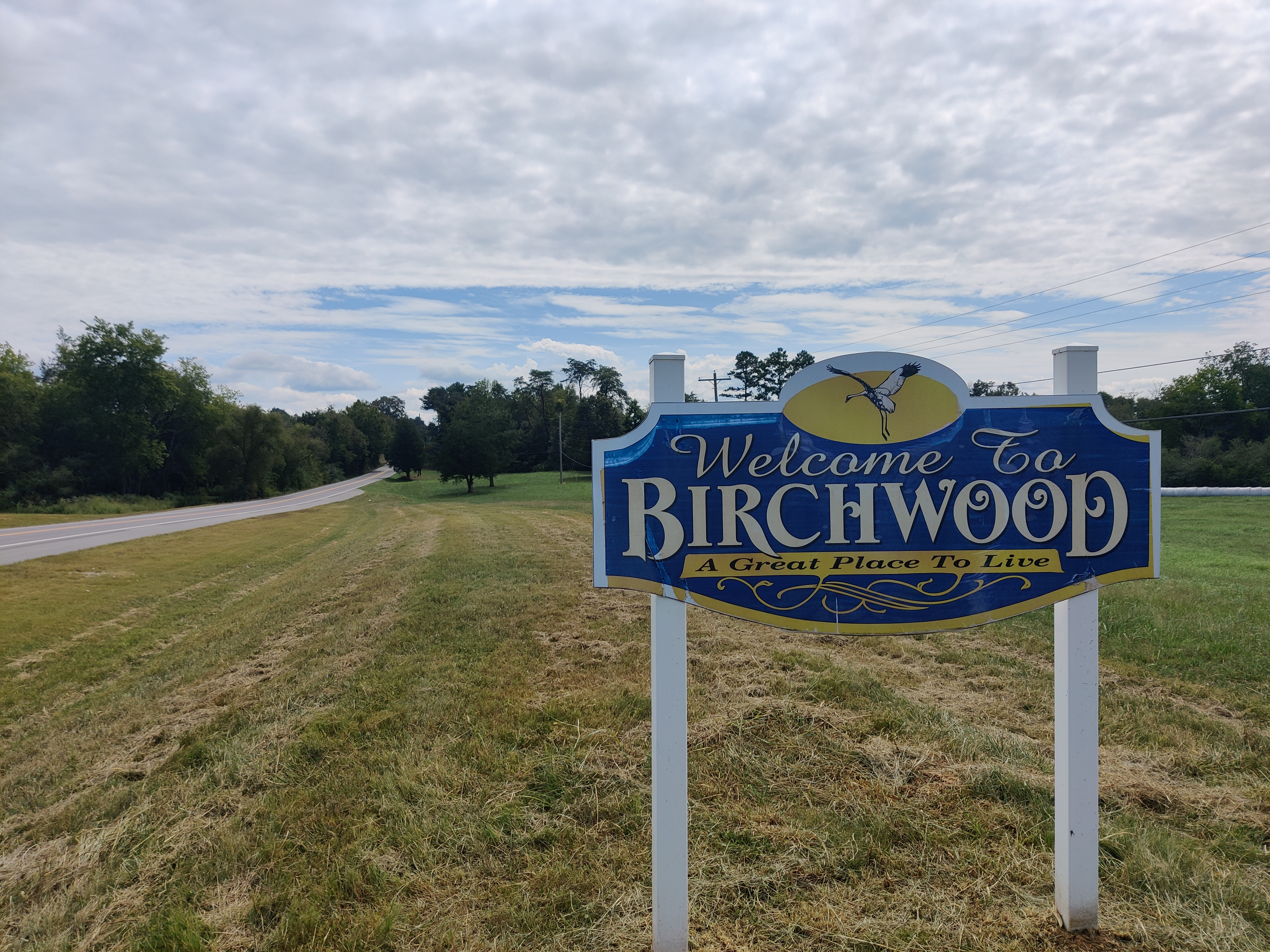

- Location within Tennessee Location within the United States
- Coordinates: 35°22′02″N 84°59′33″W
- Country: United States
- State: Tennessee
- County: Hamilton, Meigs
- Elevation: 758 ft (231 m)
- Time zone: UTC-5 (Eastern (EST))
  - Summer (DST): UTC-4 (EDT)
- ZIP code: 37308
- Area code: 423
- GNIS feature ID: 1305251

Birchwood is an unincorporated community in Hamilton and Meigs counties in Tennessee, United States. It is a rural area located along Tennessee State Route 60 and Tennessee State Route 312 (Birchwood Pike) northwest of Chattanooga. It is part of the Chattanooga, TN–GA Metropolitan Statistical Area.

According to the 2024 American Community Survey the 37308 Zip Code Tabulation Area had a total population of 3,188.

== Culture and tourism ==
Birchwood is known as the location of the Tennessee Sandhill Crane Festival, generally held annually in January at the Hiwassee Wildlife Refuge.

== History ==
The area has a long history of Native American settlement. The Cherokee leader John Jolly operated a trading post on Hiwassee Island, on the north side of what is now Birchwood. Sam Houston lived there for about three years from 1809.

The Roark family was among the earliest settlers of the Cherokee lands, with the homestead of Joseph Roark dating to about 1833. The Roark-Conner Association has continued to document the genealogy and history of Birchwood.

The area was a stopping point along the Trail of Tears, memorialized by the Cherokee Trail of Tears State Park and nearby Blythe Ferry.

Much of Birchwood, along with nearby communities in the eastern part of Hamilton County, was part of James County, Tennessee, from its creation in January 1871 until its dissolution in December 1919.
