= Blythe Ferry =

- U.S. National Register of Historic Places
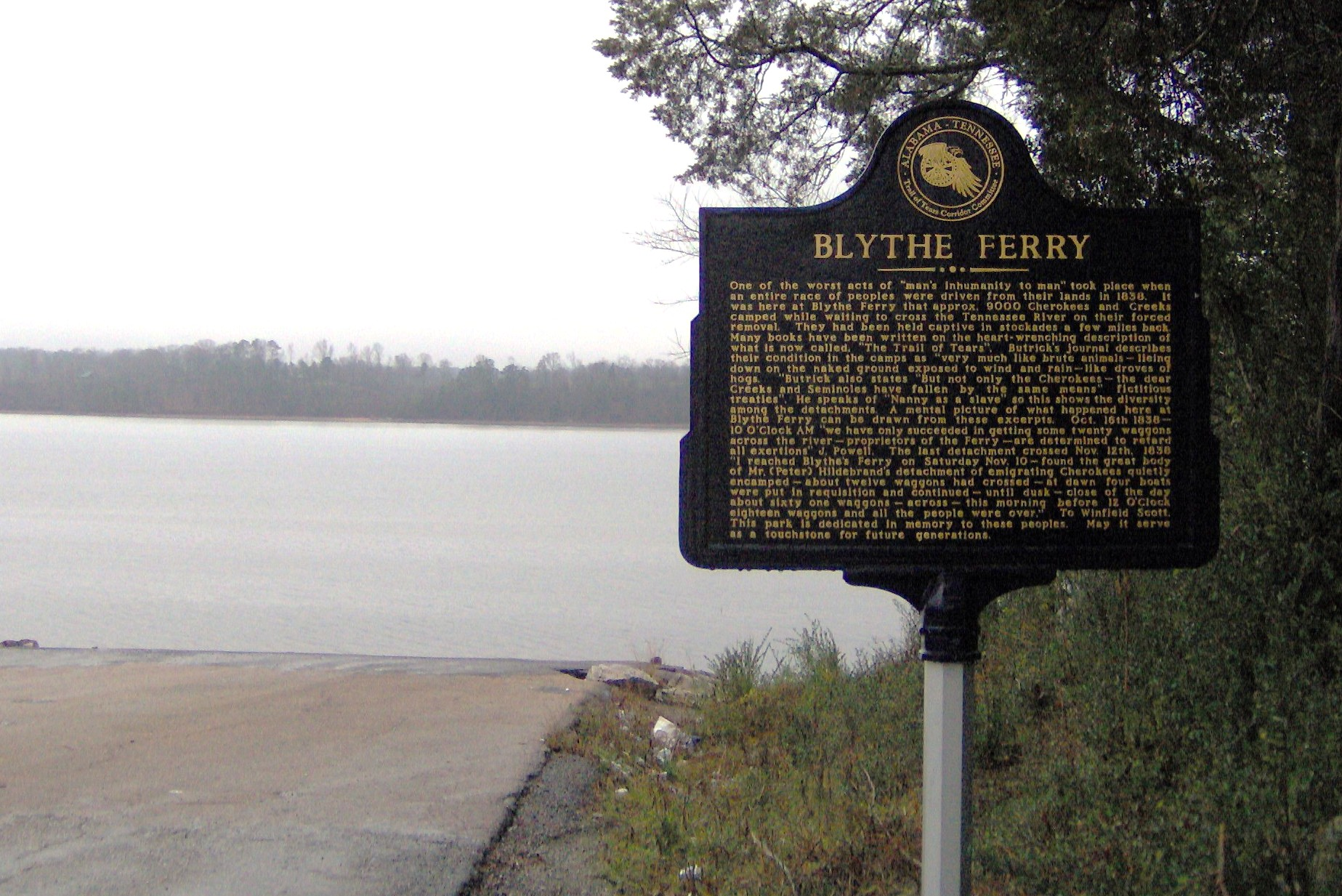
- Blythe Ferry site
- Location: North of Birchwood on S.R. 60 at Tennessee River
- Built: 1809
- Architect: William Blythe
- MPS: Meigs County, Tennessee MRA
- NRHP reference No.: 83003055
- Added to NRHP: January 5, 1983

Blythe Ferry was a ferry across the Tennessee River in Meigs County, Tennessee, United States. In 1838, the ferry served as a gathering point and crossing for the Cherokee removal, commonly called the Trail of Tears, in which thousands of Cherokee were forced to move west to Oklahoma from their homeland in the southeastern United States.

While the ferry no longer exists, the site of the ferry's east bank is now part of the Cherokee Trail of Tears State Park, which was dedicated in 2005 and established as a state park in 2026. The park comprises a section of the Hiwassee Wildlife Refuge, which is managed by the Tennessee Wildlife Resources Agency.

== Geographical setting ==
The Blythe Ferry site is situated along the eastern bank of the Chickamauga Lake impoundment of the Tennessee River, just south of the mouth of the Hiwassee River. The site is located near a point where Meigs County, Rhea County, and Hamilton County meet. Tennessee State Route 60 (SR 60), which formerly crossed the river at the ferry, connects the area to Cleveland to the east, Dayton to the west, and Decatur to the north. The unincorporated community of Birchwood is located just to the southeast.

== History ==
Blythe Ferry was established by William Blythe and his Cherokee wife, Nancy Fields, around 1809. The ferry was an important river crossing on the "Great Road" between Chattanooga and Knoxville. Blythe sold the ferry in 1825, and the Blythe family would make the trek west with the Cherokee in the 1830s.

In 1836, the Treaty of New Echota was ratified, transferring all Cherokee lands east of the Mississippi River to the United States. The treaty called for a general relocation of the Cherokee Nation to the Indian Territory (modern Oklahoma). In 1838, President Martin Van Buren ordered General Winfield Scott to round up all Cherokees who had not voluntarily made the trek to Oklahoma and commence a forced removal. By the Fall of that year, some 9,000 Cherokee and 300 Creek had been imprisoned in stockades in Bradley County, a few miles to the east. It took several weeks to move the entire contingent across the river, with the last detachment crossing on November 12, 1838.

The route that Blythe Ferry was on was grandfathered into State Route 60, and operated until July 1995, one month after a bridge was built spanning the river immediately downstream. The ferry site was placed on the National Register of Historic Places in 1982.
