= Madeline Kneberg Lewis =

American archaeologist

- Born: Madeline Dorothy Kneberg; 18 January 1903; Moline, Illinois, US
- Died: June 5, 1996 (aged 93); Winter Haven, Florida
- Education: University of Chicago (1937)
- Occupation: Anthropologist
- Spouse: Thomas M. N. Lewis

Madeline Dorothy Kneberg Lewis (18 January 1903–1996) was an American archaeologist and professor of anthropology at the University of Tennessee. She is most famous for her work on excavations in the Tennessee Valley, beginning in the 1930s. She was instrumental in establishing the anthropology department at the University of Tennessee as well as the Frank H. McClung Museum. She was the first female full professor at Tennessee outside of home economics and among the first prominent female archaeologists in the United States.

== Early life and education ==
Madeline Dorothy Kneberg was born on 18 January 1903 in Moline, Illinois, to artist and interior designer Charles Kneberg and his wife Ann (married 1879). She travelled to Italy in 1924 to study art and music in preparation for a career as a musical performer, but after four years returned to the United States and began training as a nurse at the Presbyterian Hospital of Chicago. She engaged in to graduate study in sociology at the University of Chicago, where she was persuaded to study physical anthropology under Fay-Cooper Cole, the founder of the university's Department of Anthropology. There she completed all of the requirements for a PhD save her dissertation, though she published on her graduate school research on hair variability in 1935 and 1936. She taught at Beloit College in Wisconsin for one year in 1937 before being taken onto the staff of Thomas Lewis at the University of Tennessee in 1938, who was working for the Works Progress Administration on sites inundated by TVA projects.

== Tennessee Valley excavations ==
Beginning with the Marksville, Louisiana excavations in 1933, money and work crews from a succession of federal relief agencies (the Civil Works Administration, Federal Emergency Relief Administration, Works Progress Administration, Tennessee Valley Authority, and National Park Service) were committed to major excavations all over the region.

The TVA, established in 1933 to provide for navigation, flood control, and rural electrification, was perhaps the most important agency in fostering archaeology in Tennessee and surrounding states. The agency's dam construction efforts threatened to inundate large numbers of sites, but was persuaded to also engage in salvage archeology, under the direction of archeological consultant William Webb of the University of Kentucky.

Archaeological projects in Tennessee were placed under the responsibility of Tom Lewis at the University of Tennessee. He assembled a staff of archaeologists and physical anthropologists that included Madeline Kneberg, who would take over the management of the university's archaeology laboratory and work closely with Lewis in drafting many of its most important reports. These included major surveys of the archaeology of the Chickamauga Basin (1941) and of Hiwassee Island (1946). Due to financial constraints and philosophical conflicts with the TVA and Webb, the Chickamauga report was not published in full until 1995. However, Hiwassee Island: An Archaeological Account of Four Tennessee Indian Peoples became a classic in the field, established as a model by Walter Taylor in his widely read A Study in Archaeology. Kneberg and Lewis also composed a 2,000 page manual for the UT lab, which detailed protocols for all stages of excavation and analysis and described a sophisticated catalog system for sites and artifacts.

== Later work ==
When WPA funds ran out in 1940, Kneberg joined the UT Division of Anthropology (part of the Department of History) as its second professor, becoming the first female professor at the university outside of home economics. She became the first female full professor in 1950. In 1947, in large part due to the work of Kneberg and Lewis, the division became a full department. Kneberg continued working on scientific reports, often with Lewis, through the 1950s and early 1960s. She also made major contributions to archaeology in Tennessee as an institution. Kneberg and Lewis were major drivers in the founding of the Tennessee Archaeological Society in 1944, which continues to work to support archaeology and archaeological knowledge in the state and published the annual journal Tennessee Archaeologist until 1981. In 1950, she collaborated with the Eastern Band of the Cherokee to reconstruct an 18th-century Cherokee village in Cherokee, North Carolina, which remains an important center for historical re-enactment and cultural tourism. She published popular works during this period that brought Tennessee archaeology to a lay public. The most successful of these, Tribes that Slumber: Indian Times in the Tennessee Region, she both wrote and illustrated, employing skills gained during her early life training as an artist. It remains a bestseller for the UT Press. Perhaps her most enduring physical contribution to archaeology in the state was the establishment of the Frank H. McClung Museum (now the McClung Museum of Natural History and Culture) on UT's Knoxville campus in 1961.

== Marriage and retirement ==
In 1961, at age 65, Kneberg married her longtime colleague Tom Lewis after what she described as “the longest courtship on earth.” The same year the couple retired from archaeology and moved to Winter Haven, Florida. Kneberg Lewis died there in 1996 of heart failure at the age of 93.

== Honors ==
Kneberg was elected a fellow of the American Association for the Advancement of Science in 1950. In 1995, she was honored at the Southeastern Archaeological Conference with the Distinguished Service Award. The conference dubbed her a “founding mother of Southeastern archaeology.”

== Publications ==
- 1935. Improved Technique for Hair Examination. American Journal of Physical Anthropology 20:15-67.
- 1936a. Hair Weight as a Racial Criterion. American Journal of Physical Anthropology 21:279-286.
- 1936b. Scientific Apparatus and Laboratory Methods: Differential Staining of Thick Sections of Tissues. Science 83(2):561-562.
- 1941. Prehistory of the Chickamauga Basin in Tennessee (with T. M. N. Lewis). University of Tennessee, Division of Anthropology, Tennessee Anthropological Papers No. 1. Mimeographed.
- 1945 . The Persistent Potsherd. Tennessee Archaeologist 1(4):4-5.
- 1946 . Hiwassee Island: An Archaeological Account of Four Tennessee Indian Peoples (with T. M. N. Lewis). University of Tennessee Press, Knoxville.
- 1951a. An Archaic Autobiography (with T. M. N. Lewis). Tennessee Archaeologist 7(1):1-5.
- 1951b. Early Projectile Point Forms and Examples from Tennessee (with T. M. N. Lewis). Tennessee Archaeologist 7(1):6-19.
- 1951c. An Early Woodland Autobiography (with T. M. N. Lewis). Tennessee Archaeologist 7(2):31-38.
- 1952a. The Tennessee Area. In Archaeology of Eastern United States, edited by J. B. Griffin, pp. 190–198. University of Chicago Press, Chicago.
- 1952b. The Autobiography of a Memorial Mound Builder (with T. M. N. Lewis). Tennessee Archaeologist 8(2):37-41.
- 1952c. The Autobiography of a "Bone House" Indian (with T. M. N. Lewis). Tennessee Archaeologist 8(2):37-41.
- 1952d. Comparison of Certain Mexican and Tennessee Shell Ornaments (with T. M. N. Lewis). Tennessee Archaeologist 8(2):42-46.
- 1953 . The Cherokee "Hothouse" (with T. M. N. Lewis). Tennessee Archaeologist 9(1):2-5.
- 1954a. Oconoluftee Indian Village: An Interpretation of a Cherokee Community of 1750 (with T. M. N. Lewis). Cherokee Historical Association. Cherokee, North Carolina.
- 1954b. Ten Years of the Tennessee Archaeologist, Selected Subjects (editor, with T. M. N. Lewis). J. B. Graham, Chattanooga.
- 1954c. The Duration of the Archaic Tradition in the Lower Tennessee Valley. Southern Indian Studies 5:40-44.
- 1955. The A. L. LeCroy Collection (with T. M. N. Lewis). Tennessee Archaeologist 11(2):75-82.
- 1956a. The Paleo-Indian Complex on the LeCroy Site (with T. M. N. Lewis). Tennessee Archaeologist 12(1):5-11.
- 1956b. Some Important Projectile Point Types Found in the Tennessee Area. Tennessee Archaeologist 12(1):17-28.
- 1957a. The Camp Creek Site (with T. M. N. Lewis). Tennessee Archaeologist 13(1):1-48.
- 1957b. Chipped Stone Artifacts of the Tennessee Valley Area. Tennessee Archaeologist 13(1):55-65.
- 1958a. Tribes That Slumber: Indians of the Tennessee Region (with T. M. N. Lewis). The University of Tennessee Press, Knoxville.
- 1958b. The Nuckolls Site (with T. M. N. Lewis). Tennessee Archaeologist 14(2):60-79.
- 1959a. The Archaic Culture in the Middle South (with T. M. N. Lewis). American Antiquity 25:161-183.
- 1959b. Engraved Shell Gorgets and Their Associations. Tennessee Archaeologist 15(1):1-39.
- 1961a. Eva: An Archaic Site (with T. M. N. Lewis). University of Tennessee Press, Knoxville.
- 1961b. Four Southeastern Limestone-tempered Pottery Complexes. Southeastern Archaeological Conference Newsletter 7:3-15.*
- 1962. Woodland Fabric Marked Ceramic System. Proceedings of the Sixteenth Southeastern Archaeological Conference, edited by S. Williams. 8:33-40.
- 1995. The Prehistory of the Chickamauga Basin in Tennessee. 2 vols. (Compiled and edited by L. P. Sullivan). University of Tennessee Press, Knoxville.
