= McKenzie Windmill =

- U.S. National Register of Historic Places
- Location within Tennessee Location within the United States
- Location: Georgetown, Tennessee
- Coordinates: 35°21′23″N 84°54′55″W
- Built: 1931
- Architect: Aermotor Windmill Company
- MPS: Meigs County, Tennessee MRA
- NRHP reference No.: 82004011
- Added to NRHP: July 6, 1982

McKenzie Windmill is a historic windmill on Tennessee State Route 58 in Georgetown, Tennessee.

The windmill was built in 1931 and added to the National Register of Historic Places in 1982. At the time of its listing, it was the only windmill in Meigs County.
