= Georgetown, Tennessee =

Unincorporated community in Tennessee, United States

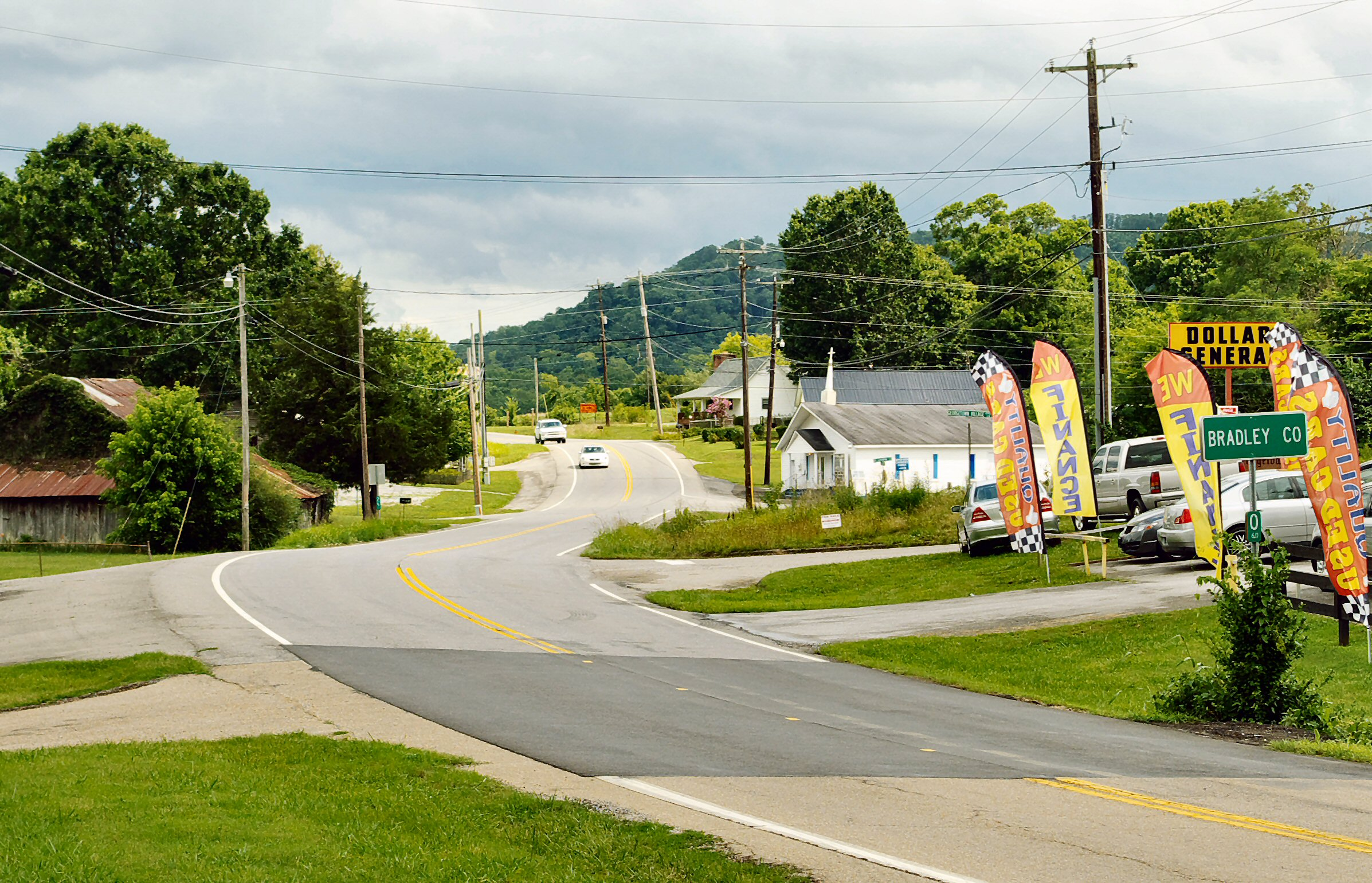
State Route 60 in Georgetown

Georgetown is an unincorporated community at the junction of Bradley, Hamilton, and Meigs counties, Tennessee. The community is located along State Route 60 near its intersection with State Route 58.

The Bradley County portion of Georgetown is part of the Cleveland, TN Metropolitan Statistical Area, while the Hamilton County portion is part of the Chattanooga, TN–GA Metropolitan Statistical Area.

Georgetown is the place name associated with U.S. Postal Service zip code 37336. The Zip Code Tabulation Area for that zip code had a population of 5,337, according to the 2020 U.S. census.

== History ==
Georgetown is located along Tennessee State Route 60, along what was part of the main Northern Route of the Trail of Tears in 1838. According to tradition, the village was named for Cherokee trader George Fields, who owned a two-story log home and operated a trading post at the intersection of Georgetown Road and Francisco Road in the early 1800s. "An affluent merchant who operated a flatboat on the Hiwassee and Tennessee Rivers, he was also an enslaver and leader in tribal politics. His two-story log dwelling, known as the George House, bears the date of 1812." The "George House" burned and was dismantled in 2014. It is believed that George Fields was buried just east of where his home once stood.

In the late 1800s, Georgetown was an active trading center featuring several gristmills, tanneries, and sawmills. Goods arrived in nearby Cleveland via the Tennessee, Virginia, and Georgia Railroad and were transported by wagon to the village. The main items produced for the market during this time were corn, wheat, and bacon.

Georgetown's first post office was established as "Limestone" on March 9, 1837, and was changed to "Georgetown" in 1867. It has since been located in four different counties, including James County, "The Lost County of Tennessee", which dissolved in 1919. It currently operates in Meigs County.

Properties on the National Register of Historic Places located in Georgetown:

National Register of Historic Places (Near Georgetown, Tennessee)
Pleasant L. Matthews House	Upload image	December 12, 1976 (#76001781)	Southwest of Georgetown on Ooltewah-Georgetown Rd. 35°16′38″N 84°57′57″W	Georgetown	Nomination Form
Bradford Rymer Barn	Upload image	July 6, 1982 (#82004012)	State Route 135°17′47″N 84°57′11″W	Georgetown	Nomination form
Scott Hooper Garage	Upload image	July 6, 1982 (#82004010)	State Route 135°21′21″N 84°54′56″W	Georgetown	
McKenzie Windmill	Upload image	July 6, 1982 (#82004011)	State Route 5835°21′23″N 84°54′55″W	Georgetown	
G. W. Shiflett Barn	Upload image	July 6, 1982 (#82004013)	State Route 135°18′37″N 84°54′53″W	Georgetown	
Andy Wood Log House and Willie Wood Blacksmith Shop	Upload image	July 6, 1982 (#82004015)	State Route 135°21′11″N 84°55′42″W	Georgetown	
Georgetown Road (Trail of Tears Segment)	Upload image	March 23, 2022 (#100007556)	8100 Block of TN 60 35°17′56″N 84°57′23″W	Georgetown	

== Education ==
The Georgetown Academy, founded in 1847 by the Cumberland Presbyterian Church, is Georgetown's earliest school of record. Located about a quarter mile southwest of the intersection of TN SR 60 and Ooltewah-Georgetown Road, it is believed to have been operated until around the time of the Civil War. The school's second floor was the location of the Limestone Lodge No. 176 F. & A.M., chartered in 1849.

== Notable people ==
- Greg Vital, American conservationist, businessman, and District 29 Tennessee State Representative
- Wilburn Cartwright, lawyer, educator, U.S. Representative from Oklahoma, and United States Army officer in World War II was born here
