= Chickamauga Lake =

Lake in Tennessee, United States

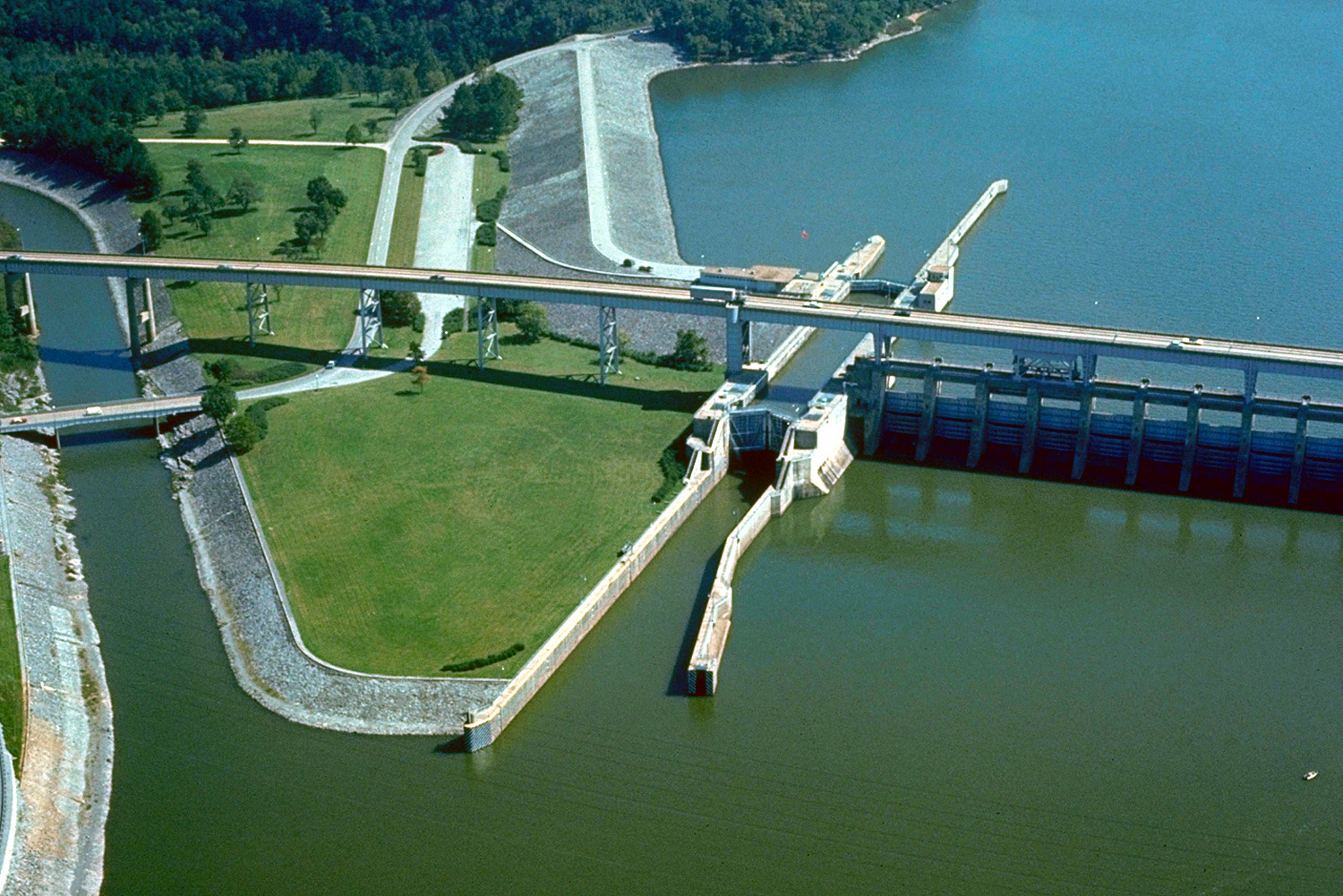
- Chickamauga Lock and Dam

- Location within Tennessee Location within the United States
- Location: Hamilton / Rhea / Meigs / McMinn / Bradley counties, Tennessee
- Coordinates: 35°06′14″N 85°13′46″W
- Type: reservoir
- Primary inflows: Tennessee River, Hiwassee River
- Primary outflows: Tennessee River
- Catchment area: 20,790 square miles (53,846 km^{2})
- Basin countries: United States
- Surface area: 36,240 acres (147 km^{2})
- Max. depth: 72 ft (22 m)
- Surface elevation: 679 ft (207 m)

Chickamauga Lake is a reservoir in the United States along the Tennessee River created when the Chickamauga Dam, as part of the Tennessee Valley Authority, was completed in 1940. The lake stretches from Watts Bar Dam at mile 529.9 (853 km) to Chickamauga Dam at mile 471.0 (758 km) making the lake 58.9 miles (94.8 km) long. It borders Rhea County, Meigs County, and Hamilton County with 810 miles (1,303 km) of shoreline and two bridges crossing it at State Highway 60 and Highway 30. The lake is commonly used for recreational and outdoor activities, especially at the southern end, due to the high population density surrounding it. It was named after the Chickamauga Cherokee who used to live in the area.

The Hiwassee River empties into Chickamauga Lake at Hiwassee Island, just north of the Highway 60 bridge at mile 500 (804.5 km).

Chickamauga Lake is immediately downstream from Watts Bar Lake and immediately upstream from Nickajack Lake.

Full pool for Chickamauga Lake is 682 feet (208 m) above sea level; the current lake level can be checked . The normal operating zone is between 675 ft (206 m) and 677 ft (206 m) through the end of March, rising steadily to a summer range of 681.5 to 682.5 ft (207.7 to 208.0 m) by the middle of May. Then, full pool is maintained through the end of August, at which time the level drops steadily back down to 676 ft (206 m) by the end of November. Actual lake levels vary due to weather conditions and power needs.

The lake is a popular venue for fishing and a variety of gamefish can be caught there including largemouth bass, smallmouth bass and catfish. As a result, the venue hosts popular fishing tournaments.

== See also ==
- Dams and reservoirs of the Tennessee River
- Harrison Bay State Park, a park along the shore of Chickamauga Lake
- Booker T. Washington State Park (Tennessee), another park along the shore of Chickamauga Lake
