= APD-40 =

Highway in Cleveland, Tennessee, United States

APD-40
- Veterans Memorial Highway

Route information
- Length: 9.22 mi (14.84 km)
- Existed: 1965 as ADHS Corridor K–present
- History: Completed in 1975
- Component highways: US 64 Byp. / US 74 / SR 311 / SR 60

Major junctions
- South end: I-75 in Cleveland
- US 11 / US 64 in Cleveland; SR 60 south in Cleveland; SR 74 in East Cleveland; US 64 in East Cleveland
- North end: US 11 / SR 60 in Cleveland

Location
- Country: United States
- State: Tennessee
- Counties: Bradley

Highway system
- Tennessee State Routes; Interstate; US; State
← SR 310	SR 311	→ SR 312

APD-40 or APD 40 is a road composed of the U.S. Route 64 Bypass (US 64 Byp.) and a section of State Route 60 (SR 60) which forms a partial beltway around the business district of Cleveland, Tennessee. The route takes its name from its part of Corridor K of the Appalachian Development Highway System and is sometimes called Appalachian Highway or simply the Cleveland Bypass. The route is also designated as Veterans Memorial Highway. The US 64 Byp. section of the road is multiplexed with unsigned State Route 311 (SR 311) and US 74. The road is a four-lane divided highway its entire length, and parts are controlled-access. The bypass is an east–west route, and the state route runs north–south.

APD-40 runs 9.22 miles (14.84 km) counterclockwise from Interstate 75 (I-75) in southwest Cleveland around the business district to US 11 near the geographic center of the city. The route arose out of an effort to relieve congestion around downtown Cleveland, and the first section was constructed along with I-75 as a spur into the city, opening in 1966. The remainder of the route was constructed in three sections between 1970 and 1975. Since then, the growth of the city of Cleveland has resulted in traffic volumes that have placed considerable congestion and safety hazards on parts of the route.

== Route description ==
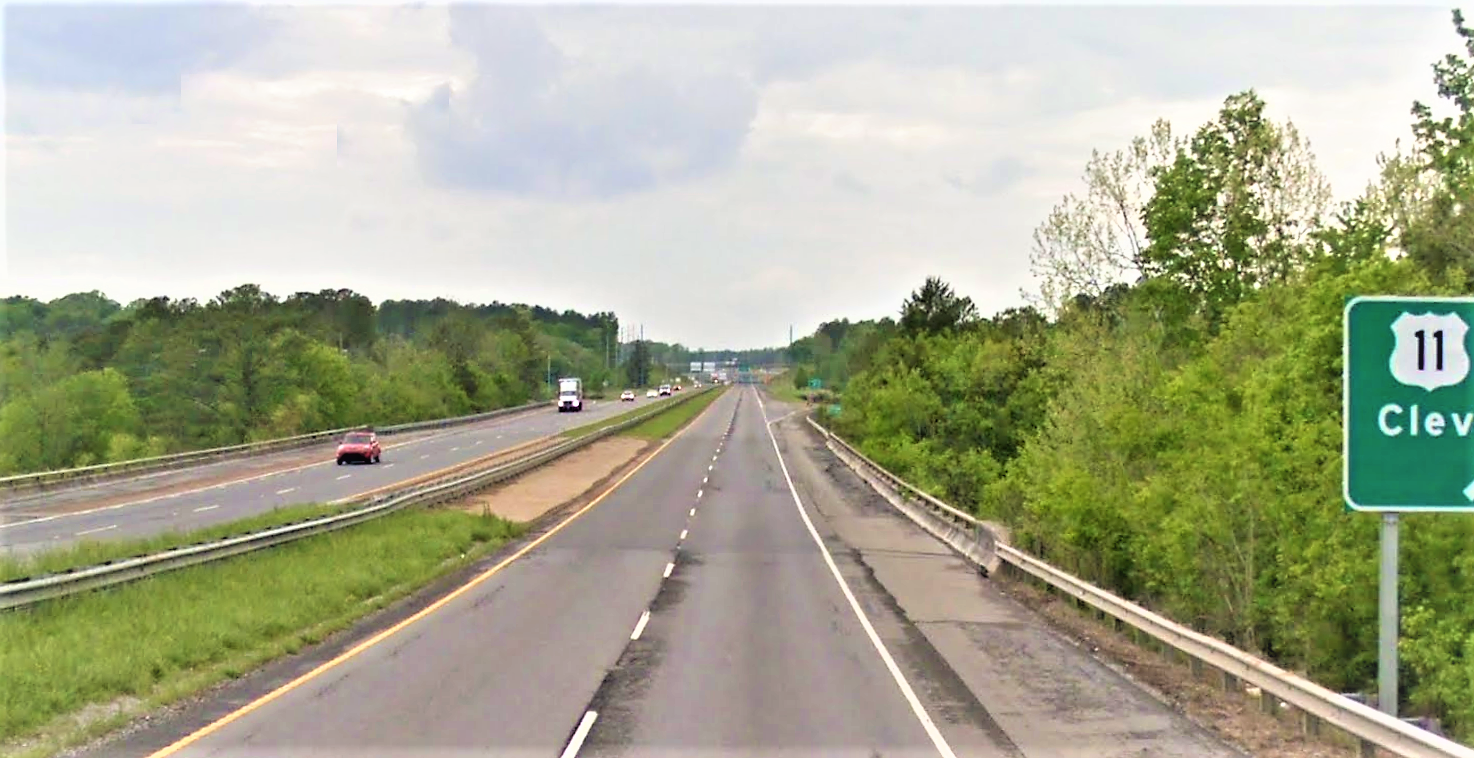
APD-40/US 64 Byp. westbound approaching US 11/64 (South Lee Highway).

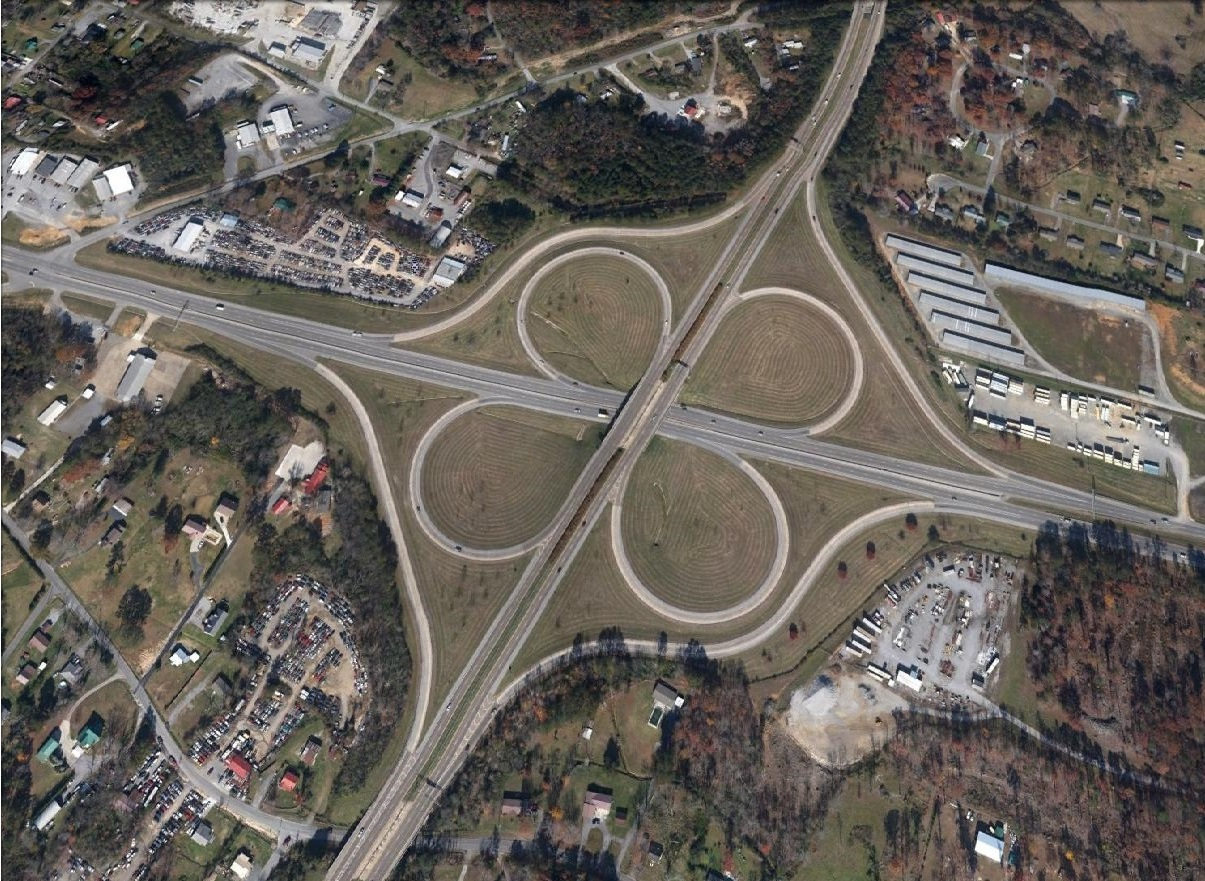
Aerial view of the cloverleaf interchange with APD-40 (US 64 Byp., SR 60) and US 64 (Waterlevel Highway)

APD-40 is maintained by the Tennessee Department of Transportation (TDOT), along with all other Interstate, US, and state highways in Tennessee. The entire route is part of the National Highway System (NHS), a national network of roads identified as important to the national economy, defense, and mobility; the US 64 Bypass section is one of the few non-Interstate components in Tennessee of the Strategic Highway Network (STRAHNET), a sublevel of the NHS that is important to the country's defense policy. In 2025, annual average daily traffic (AADT) volumes ranged from 24,598 vehicles per day at the Cherokee Gateway interchange to 36,738 vehicles per day between SR 74 and US 64.

APD-40 begins at the Exit 20 interchange on I-75 as US 64 Byp., which is also the western terminus of Corridor K. Beginning as controlled-access, it rounds a minor curve to the southeast and enters a long straightaway on the edge of the city limits of Cleveland. It comes to an interchange first with the Cherokee Gateway and then US 11/US 64 (South Lee Highway) approximately 1.5 miles (2.4 km) later. The route then crosses Candies Creek Ridge on a relatively steep grade, and about 2.5 miles (4.0 km) from the Interstate, the freeway ends, and the road enters South Cleveland, passing an industrial park with several major factories and manufacturers before crossing a Norfolk Southern Railway. It then crosses Lead Mine Ridge; junctions at an interchange with Blue Springs Road, a connector to Red Clay State Historic Park in southern Bradley County; and crosses another Norfolk Southern railroad. The road travels for about one mile (1.6 km) through a business and residential area before crossing SR 60 (Dalton Pike) and intersecting with McGrady Drive, which is a connector to SR 60. The road then curves sharply to the northeast and becomes a limited-access highway, reaching an interchange with SR 74 (Spring Place Road) about 1/4 mile (0.40 km) later. Bypassing Cleveland to the east on the edge of the East Cleveland community, the route enters a straightaway, and about one mile (1.6 km) later, APD-40 once again becomes a freeway, interchanging with US 64 (Waterlevel Highway) in a cloverleaf interchange and becoming SR 60. Here the ADHS corridor splits from the route and continues east on US 64 into North Carolina. The road curves slightly to the northwest and has an interchange with Benton Pike. It then has an interchange with Overhead Bridge Road; crosses this road, a Norfolk Southern line, and 20th Street on a single set of bridges; and has an interchange with the latter. The highway then curves again to the northwest where the freeway ends about 1/2 mile (0.80 km) later and the road becomes 25th Street, entering into a commercial area near the geographic center of Cleveland. The road intersects with US 11 (Ocoee Street) about 1/2 mile (0.80 km) later and I-75 a few miles beyond this point, continuing north eventually to Dayton.

== History ==
=== Background and construction ===
The route that is now APD-40 was originally proposed and built to relieve congestion and divert commercial through traffic away from downtown Cleveland, which increased as a result of industrial and residential growth. The initial plans for I-75 in Cleveland included two interchanges: one with a connector to US 11/64 southwest of the city and another with SR 60 near what was then the northwestern city limits. Both of these routes were intended to be four-lane spurs, with the former an entirely new road and the latter a widening and relocation of SR 60. Two projects preceded APD-40: the construction of the four-lane alignment of SR 60 (25th Street) from north of I-75 to the US 11 Bypass (Keith Street) between 1963 and 1965, and the widening of 25th Street between the US 11 Bypass and US 11 (Ocoee Street) from 1968 to 1969. On December 19, 1963, state highway commissioner David Pack rejected a petition by residents of the McDonald community and the Hamilton County community of Ooltewah to relocate the I-75 interchange with what is now APD-40 two miles (3.2 km) to the southwest. These residents had argued the shift would be more beneficial to their communities and believed that the proposed location was impractical since it was in an area that was sparsely populated at the time.

The first section of APD-40, located between I-75 and US 11/64 (South Lee Highway), was constructed at the same time as the corresponding section of I-75 between Ooltewah and SR 60 in Cleveland. The first contract was let on December 13, 1963, and the stretch was officially opened on October 18, 1966, along with I-75. When the ADHS was created by the Appalachian Regional Development Act of 1965, the section between I-75 and US 64, as well as US 64 into North Carolina, became part of Corridor K. Construction of the extension to US 64, as well as the widening of US 64 to four lanes between Cleveland and Ocoee, was subsequently funded by this legislation. The design for this extension was approved by the Federal Highway Administration (FHWA) in November 1969. The contract for the segment between US 11/64 and Blythe Avenue, about 1/4 mile (0.40 km) east of Blue Springs Road, was awarded on January 30, 1970, and construction was completed in November 1971. The contract to construct the segment between Blythe Avenue and US 64, including the cloverleaf interchange with the latter, was awarded on November 19, 1971, and the segment was completed in August 1973.

While not initially planned, the need to provide a continuous loop around Cleveland to relieve congestion and improve mobility was quickly realized. A public hearing was held on November 5, 1969, on the possibility of extending the bypass between US 64 and US 11 (Ocoee Street). Unlike the other sections, however, this project required an environmental impact statement (EIS) since it had not been approved prior to the enactment of the National Environmental Policy Act. The EIS was approved on December 20, 1971, and the design was subsequently approved by the FHWA in July 1972. In preparation for this project, the Tennessee Valley Authority began relocating a subtransmission line in April 1973, and construction began the following November. On April 3, 1974, construction equipment was damaged by winds from a nearby tornado that was part of a record-breaking tornado outbreak in the United States and Canada. Grading and bridge construction was completed by the end of that year, and the entire project was completed in October 1975, one month behind schedule. This was one of the first highway projects in Tennessee to utilize jersey barrier-style bridge railings, which had recently been deemed safer than conventional designs after crash tests.

=== Traffic hazards and later history ===
Early in its history, APD-40 developed a notoriety for its high rate of traffic accidents. In 1973, an at-grade intersection with Varnell Road, located at the bottom of the steep downgrade on the western slope of Candies Creek Ridge, was reconstructed with an overpass after many accidents occurred immediately after being opened to traffic. Prior to construction, the then-incumbent superintendent of the Bradley County Road Department had reportedly requested TDOT to make this change to the design, but they had refused. That same year, TDOT considered replacing the at-grade intersection with Blackburn Road with an underpass, but a number of residents requested that access between the roads remain. The intersection continued to see frequent accidents and, in 1985, was improved in a project that constructed new turn lanes and added a traffic signal. As Cleveland grew and traffic increased over the succeeding decades, several of the interchanges, some of which have 15-mile-per-hour (24 km/h) advisory speeds, started to become problematic. The Benton Pike interchange especially became a point of contention when Whirlpool Corporation moved their plant onto this road from downtown Cleveland in 2012, resulting in a large increase in truck traffic and crashes. As a result, TDOT installed additional warning signs at all of the interchanges with hazardous ramps in 2015. However, most of the route has changed little since its initial construction, and TDOT has at times been accused of neglecting these safety hazards.

After many years of proposals and lobbying from local officials, TDOT began a project in August 2013 to rework the interchange with I-75. The original route narrowed at the interchange and crossed the Interstate on a two-lane bridge, which had come to experience backups at nearly all times during the day. The project was completed and dedicated on December 15, 2015. The old bridge was replaced with a six-lane bridge, and the ramps were rebuilt and widened, with turn lanes added.

In 2005, plans for a new interchange between I-75 and US 11/64 began to materialize in order to allow commercial development in this area, and in 2009, TDOT undertook a feasibility study for this project. This project was further spearheaded in the early 2010s, when the city and county planned a controversial publicly owned industrial park directly south of this section of APD-40. Construction on the interchange began in early 2015, and it was completed and dedicated on May 12, 2017. The industrial park was opposed and criticized by many locals as a boondoggle and waste of taxpayer money, as well as corporate welfare. Subsequently, TDOT's decision to construct this interchange was criticized as pork barrel and a prioritization over more urgent needs in the area, such as improvements to other hazards on APD-40.

=== Designation history ===
The first segment of APD-40 was initially signed as part of State Route 40 (SR 40), which was established in 1923 as the state designation for US 64 between Cleveland and the North Carolina state line. It became known as the US 64 Bypass and the SR 40 Bypass after construction began on the extension. The SR 40 Bypass was replaced with SR 311 on July 1, 1983, during a state highway renumbering that year. The section between US 64 and US 11 was initially known as the SR 60 Bypass, but SR 60 was rerouted onto this section when construction was completed. SR 60 originally turned south about 1/4 mile (400 m) past the interchange with I-75 and went directly to downtown; it was moved to 25th Street NW in the mid-1960s after that road was widened, and onto the section of APD-40 to US 64 after it opened. US 74 was added to the route by the American Association of State Highway Transportation Officials on June 9, 1986. This route, however, remains largely unsigned.

In addition, APD-40 also bears four honorary designations. The entire route was designated "Veterans Memorial Highway" by the Tennessee General Assembly in January 2007. The Tennessee General Assembly subsequently named the Cherokee Gateway interchange the "Honorable Mayor Tom Rowland Interchange" in October 2014 after a mayor of Cleveland who served from 1991 to 2018. On July 10, 2016, the parallel bridges across 20th Street, the railroad, and Overhead Bridge Road were designated as the "Dustin Ledford Memorial Bridge" in honor of a man who was killed by an intoxicated driver near the Overhead Bridge Road exit. In September 2018, the I-75 interchange was named the "Representative Kevin Brooks Interchange" after a longtime state representative who succeeded Rowland as mayor of Cleveland.

== Major intersections ==
The entire route is in Bradley County.

Location	mi	km	Destinations	Notes
Cleveland	0.00	0.00	US 64 Byp. begins (SR 311 begins) / US 74 west / I-75 – Knoxville, Chattanooga	Interchange; clockwise terminus of APD-40; clockwise end of US 64 Byp./US 74 overlap; I-75 exit 20; road continues west as Pleasant Grove Road
Cleveland	0.63	1.01	Cherokee Gateway	Interchange
Cleveland	1.51	2.43	US 11 / US 64 (S Lee Highway/SR 2) – Cleveland	Interchange
Cleveland	3.59	5.78	Blue Springs Road – Red Clay State Historic Area	Interchange
Cleveland	4.98	8.01	SR 60 (Dalton Pike) – Dalton Ga.	At-grade intersection via access road (McGrady Drive)
East Cleveland	5.33	8.58	SR 74 (Spring Place Road) – Chatsworth Ga.	Interchange
East Cleveland	6.66	10.72	US 64 Byp. ends (SR 311 ends) / US 74 east / US 64 / SR 60 south (Waterlevel Highway/ SR 40) – Ocoee, Cleveland	Interchange; counterclockwise end of US 64 Byp. overlap; clockwise end of SR 60 overlap
East Cleveland	7.39	11.89	Benton Pike	Interchange
Cleveland	7.81	12.57	Overhead Bridge Road	Interchange
Cleveland	7.87	12.67	20th Street NE	Interchange
Cleveland	9.22	14.84	SR 60 north (25th Street NW) / US 11 (Ocoee Street/SR 74) – Dayton, Athens	Counterclockwise terminus of APD-40; counterclockwise end of SR 60 overlap; at-grade intersection; road continues west as SR 60 (25th Street NW)
1.000 mi = 1.609 km; 1.000 km = 0.621 mi: Concurrency terminus

== See also ==
- Paul Huff Parkway
