= Oldfort, Tennessee =

- Unincorporated community
- Location within Tennessee Location within the United States
- Coordinates: 35°03′55″N 84°43′57″W
- Country: United States
- State: Tennessee
- County: Polk
- Elevation: 856 ft (261 m)
- Time zone: UTC-5 (Eastern (EST))
  - Summer (DST): UTC-4 (EDT)
- ZIP code: 37362
- Area code: 423
- GNIS feature ID: 1296400

Old Fort is an unincorporated community in Polk County, Tennessee, United States. Old Fort is located along U.S. Route 411, Tennessee State Route 33 and a CSX Transportation line 8.75 miles (14.08 km) south-southwest of Benton. Oldfort has a post office with ZIP code 37362.

The eponymous fort was Marr's Fort, believed to have been established in 1814 during the Creek War under the command of George Washington Lent Marr, although possibly earlier during construction of the Georgia Road. Capt. John Morrow reused the fort in 1837 to effect the Cherokee removal. The fort's preserved blockhouse now sits at a museum near Delano.
