= Hiwassee Island =

Island in the Tennessee River

Coordinates: 35°25′18.25″N 84°59′18.83″W

Hiwassee Island (Tennessee)

Hiwassee Island, also known as Jollys Island and Benham Island, is located in Meigs County, Tennessee, at the confluence of the Tennessee and Hiwassee Rivers. It is about 35 mi (56 km) northeast of Chattanooga. The island was the second largest land mass on the Tennessee River at 781 acres before the Tennessee Valley Authority created the Chickamauga Lake as a part of the dam system on the Tennessee River in 1940. Much of the island is now submerged, leaving 400 acres above the waterline.

The island has been inhabited as early as the Archaic and Woodland periods. A Mississippian culture village was inhabited by people of the Hiwassee Island and Dallas phases beginning in the 11th century. It was a Cherokee village of about 300 people in the 19th century. The village was led by Chief John Jolly, and Sam Houston lived there for three years.

When the state of Tennessee grew corn nearby to attract Canada geese, they attracted up to 20,000 sandhill cranes. Now there are fewer than 1,000 cranes and a few hundred pelicans that stopover on their seasonal treks.

== Native Americans ==
There are 17 Native American tribes who have connections to the island. The island was inhabited intermittently through pre-historic periods into historic times. It was among several Native American Mound Builder sites in the Chickamauga Reservoir Basin. Mounds began to be built in the area in the 9th and 11th centuries. At some point, perhaps as early as the Late Woodland phase, there was a stockade that surrounded the village. Initially, residents hunted and gathered food in the area. They became farmers, growing maize, which likely led to a growth of the island's population. Initially, manufactured pottery was tempered with limestone, but later almost all of the town's pottery was tempered with shells. Hiwassee Island Complicated Stamp pottery, similar to that of northern Georgia, was made on the island by the Cherokee.

=== Cherokee village ===
==== Early settlement ====
It is suggested that the Cherokee began as a Woodland culture (1000 BC – AD 1000) and had adopted a general southeastern pattern after having assimilated some of the traits of the Mississippian culture (ca. 800 CE to 1600 CE). Sustained interactions with whites began in the 17th century. The Cherokee, who were centered in the highlands of North and South Carolina into the 17th century, expanded into Tennessee during or after whites settled in the area. The Cherokee assimilated some of the cultural traits of the Europeans.

After 1650, settlement by people of European descent impacted the lives of the Cherokee. Their population was reduced by disease and warfare. Some villages were abandoned as the Cherokee gravitated to arable land for crops and ranching. There were fewer labor-intensive mounds and townhouses. Deerskins were traded by the Cherokee for manufactured goods, like garden tools, paint, clothing, beads, ornaments, and rum. They also traded for weapons that made it easier to hunt deer. By the early 18th century about 50,000 skins were exported from Charleston, South Carolina. The weapons made them more successful combatants when at war.

In the late 17th and early 18th centuries, shell gorget styles and burial pits were made on Hiwassee Island. Stones were used in mound construction and earth lodges were constructed for ceremonial purposes. The dead were buried in chambered tombs. They used rattlesnake motifs to decorate shell gorgets.

==== Latter settlement ====
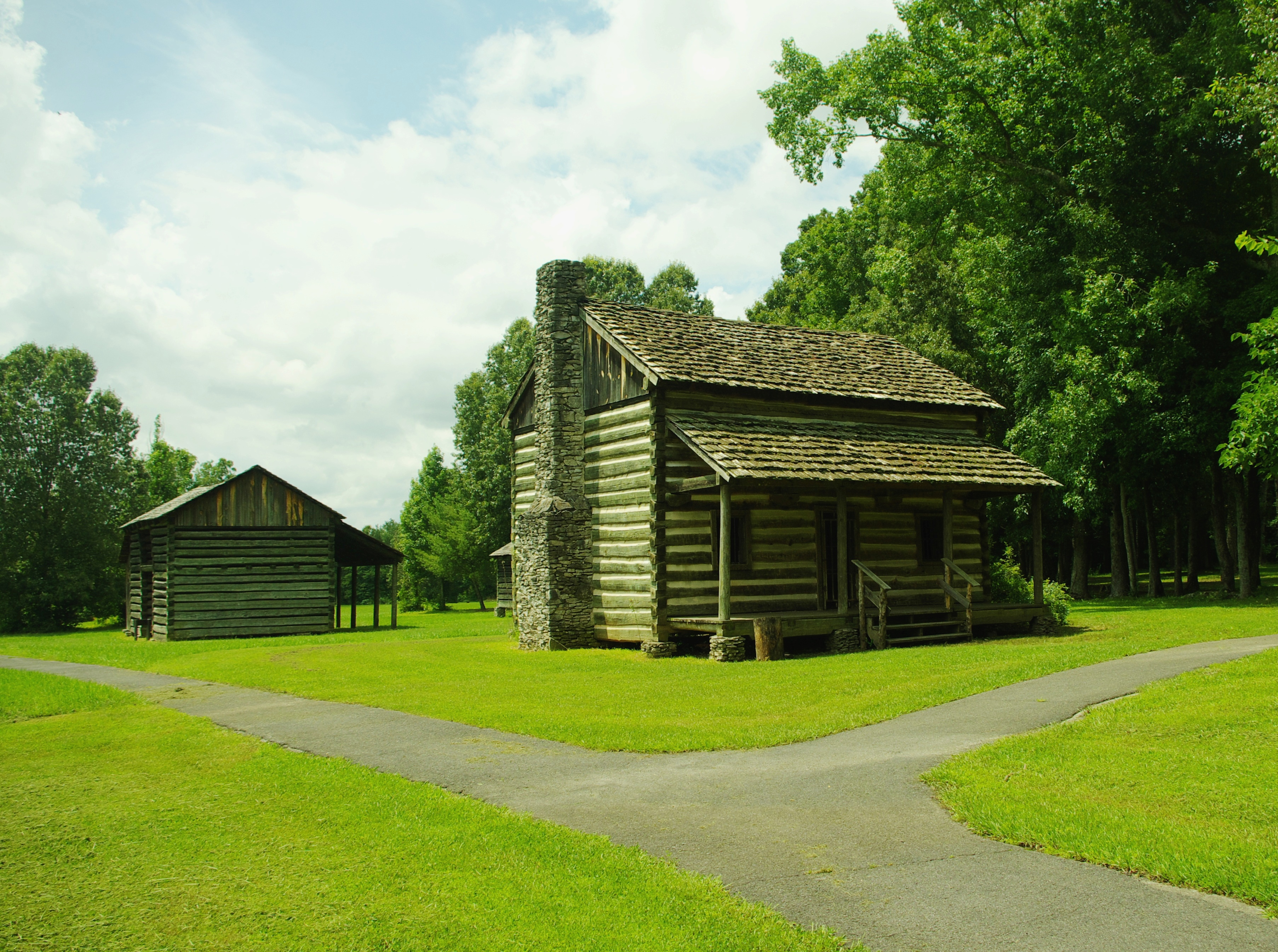
Reconstruction of an early 19th-century Cherokee farm in Tennessee

The last native people to inhabit the island were a small group of Cherokee from the late 18th century into the 19th century. The Cherokee were led by Chief John Jolly (also known as Oolooteeskee). In 1809, Sam Houston came to live with the Cherokee. He later married Jolly's niece, Diana Rogers Gentry. They cultivated corn and assimilated ways of Anglo-Europeans, such as establishing a constitution and treaties, as well as printing a newspaper called the Phoenix.

The Cherokee had developed a loose sociopolitical "tribal state", where earlier settlements of the late prehistoric (before 1550) and early historic periods (from 1550) had a more autonomous village-ceremonial-center groupings. There were three Cherokee historic districts by the early 19th century. 1) Ridge and Valley, or Overhill town, including Hiwassee Island, 2) Piedmont, or Lower Cherokee and 3) Blue Ridge, or Middle Cherokee districts. The Overhill towns were located in Ridge and Valley area of southeastern Tennessee, northwestern Georgia, and northeastern Alabama. There were different dialects for each of these districts. Western or Otali dialect was spoken in Tennessee in the Overhill districts.

Hiwassee Complicated Stamped pottery, a common material tradition of the Cherokee with a long history in the Georgia piedmont region, suggests that the "Cherokee culture was the end product of a long, continuous, and multilinear development in the south Appalachian region." It is among the Southern Appalachian pottery of the Mississippian culture and is very similar to the Etowah Complicated Stamped pottery of the Etowah Indian Mounds culture of Georgia. The difference is that the pottery from Hiwassee Island is tempered with finely to medium ground shell instead of sand or grit. Known vessels include bowls with rounded bases and globular jars. The use of ground shell to temper pottery, as well as abundance of plain surface finish, distinguishes the pottery of Overhill towns from Lower (Piedmont) and Middle Cherokee (Blue Ridge Mountain) districts. All three of the historic Cherokee districts produced complicated stamping pottery.

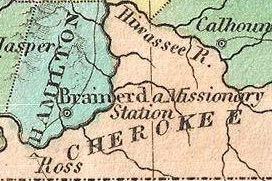
Detail of an 1827 map depicting a substantial part of southeastern Tennessee and northwestern Georgia as a confined territory assigned to the lower Creek and Cherokee nations.

Return J. Meigs Sr. was an Indian agent for the Cherokee from 1801 to 1823. He encouraged education, such as the establishment of the Brainerd Mission in what is now Chattanooga. He was respected by the Cherokees until they grew frustrated by the degree of white encroachment of their lands. As the result of westward expansion of white Americans, the tribe left the island in 1818. The Calhoun Treaty of 1819 ceded the land to the United States. Most of the remains of the former village are a couple of feet below ground.

==== Cherokee Trail of Tears State Park ====
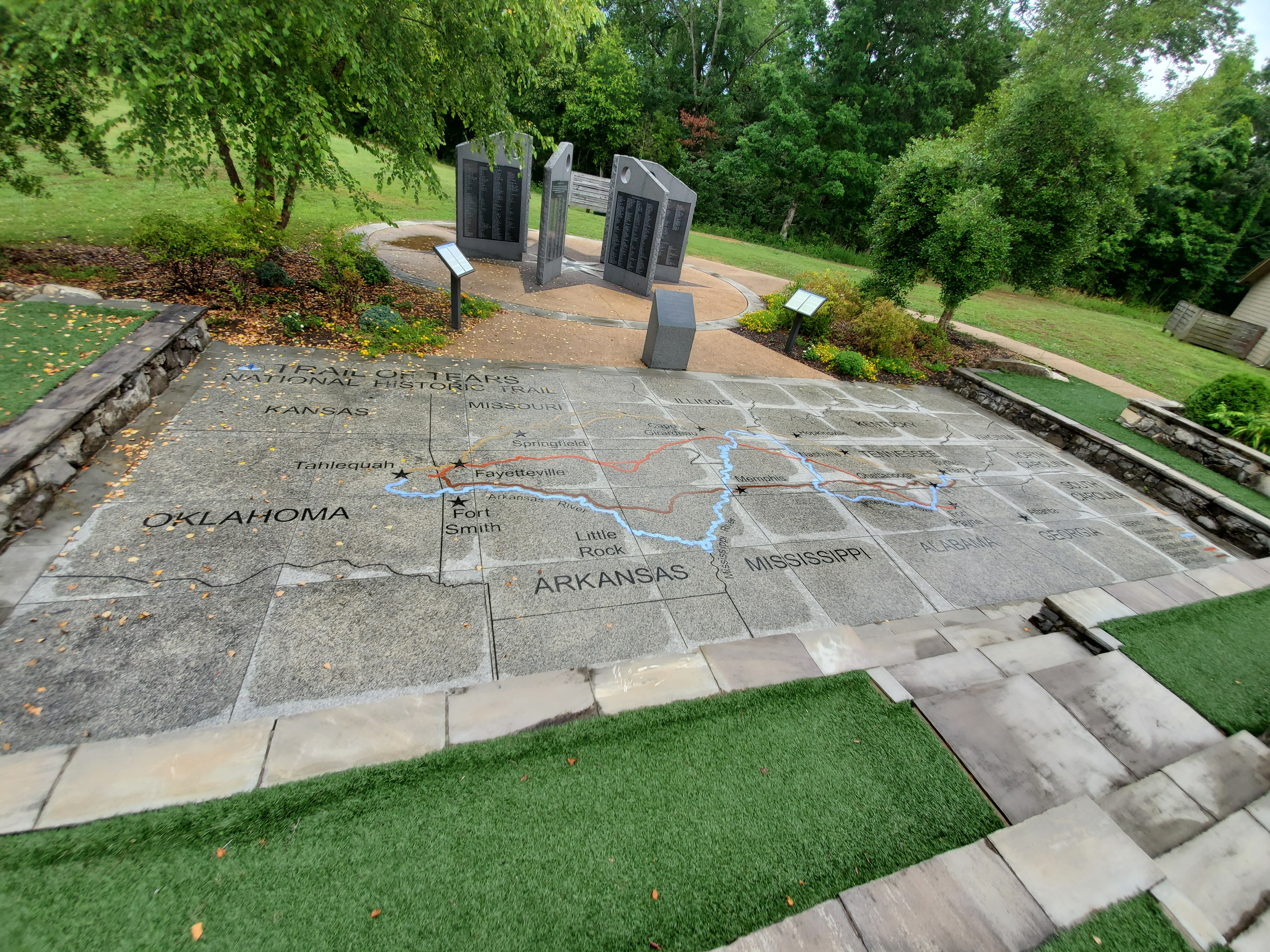
Walkway map at Cherokee Trail of Tears State Park depicting the route of the Cherokee on the Trail of Tears

The Cherokee Trail of Tears State Park, overlooking Hiwassee Island, was established to honor the relationship between Houston and Native Americans who lived in Tennessee, Arkansas, and Oklahoma. It is located near Dayton, Tennessee, and the confluence of the Tennessee and Hiwassee Rivers. Initially established as a county-run park called Cherokee Removal Memorial Park, it became a state park in 2026.

=== Creeks and Yuchi ===
In Hiwassee Island by Thomas M.N. Lewis and Madeline Kneberg, the authors assert that there were Creeks in eastern Tennessee by 1450 and both Creeks and Yuchi were in the area by 1540. The Creeks stayed in the area until 1700 to 1715.

=== Mississippian village ===
The Hiwassee Island and Dallas cultures are the primary periods of habitation on the island during the Middle Mississippian culture. There may have been two additional but unconfirmed phases of habitation on the island, Martin Farm (900 to 1100) and Mouse Creek (began in the 1400s) that overlapped with the Dallas phase.

==== Hiwassee Island culture ====
People of the Hiwassee culture lived on the island beginning in the 11th century. The people of the Hiwassee Island phase (ca. 1100–1300), also called the Irwin focus, was an Early Middle Mississippian culture. On the north end of the island, there was a four-acre palisaded village of the Mississippian era. It had a central plaza and a number of houses that were found under a large platform mound, which was 23 feet high by 148 feet in diameter at the base.

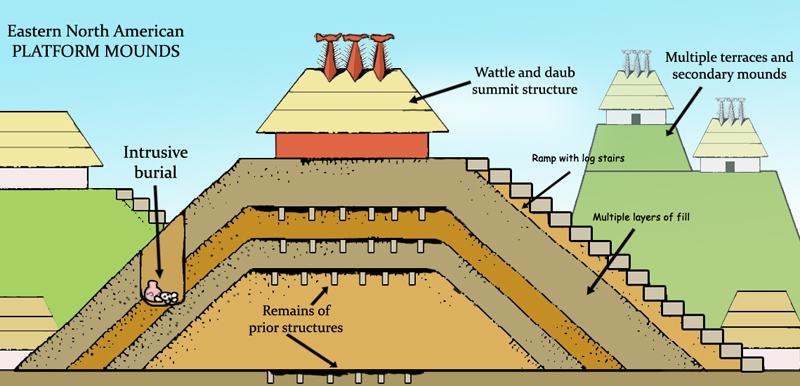
A diagram showing the various components of Eastern North American indigenous ceremonial substructure mounds of platform mounds

Large platform mounds began to be built by the 12th century. The platforms were substructures for important buildings. Within the mound, there were multiple summits with multiple buildings. There were four phases of habitation by the Hiwassee Island culture, with 30 rectangular buildings, mostly built of wall trenches or small-pole single-post construction. Pottery from the period includes Hiwassee Island Red Filmed and Hiwassee Island Red-on-Buff types. It is a rare example of pottery painted in red in the Eastern United States.

In the latter part of this period, more Hiwassee red pottery was produced. Instead of interring the dead in conical burial mounds, they were buried in the platform mounds. More sophisticated technology was used to create tools, like monolithic axes, and ornaments, such as engraved shell gorgets, headdresses, and copper ornaments.

==== Dallas culture ====
A late Middle Mississippian culture, the people of the Dallas Phase (ca. 1300–1600) were believed to be Creek Indians. (Note: Some researchers believe the Dallas culture may have extended into the 1700s and another school of thought that it only went to 1550.) The phase was named for the Dallas site, another archaeological site within the Chickamauga Reservoir Basin. Lewis and Kneberg state that the population of the village increased in the latter part of the Dallas phase when a group moved up the Tennessee River.

There were four phases of habitation by the Dallas culture who built square buildings built of log single-post wall construction, with four roof supports and wall-trench entrances. Later in the Dallas phase, only buildings on the top of summits were built with small posts set in trenches. Structures were now supported by large posts.

In this phase, a single summit replaced the platform mound of the Hiwassee Island phase. When people died, their bodies were placed in or around dwellings or in the mound. One hundred eighty eight people were buried near the Dallas culture houses in rectangular pits. Buried with them were stone and bone tools, pottery, shell beads, cups and gorgets. Gorgets were designed with a variety of patterns.

The Dallas culture was differentiated from the Hiwassee Island culture by their greater production of shell-tempered, cord-wrapped pottery. Lug handles and straps were added to jars. They made Late Mississippian Dallas Decorated and Modeled pottery with new designs, like effigy motifs and incising.

There were periods of time when the island does not appear to have been inhabited, such as from the 13th to the 14th century, when the number of settlements in the Chickamauga basin decreased, and the settlements had larger mounds, suggesting a consolidation of smaller groups of people. There were other Dallas Phase settlements along the Tennessee River between Chattanooga and Knoxville. Other sites within the Chickamauga Reservoir Basin include the Davis, Hixon, and Sale Creek sites.

=== Archaic and Woodland periods ===
The earliest people to inhabit the island were of the Archaic phase (377 to 1348 B.C.) After that, it was inhabited by people of the Woodland period. The Watts Barr focus (later found at Candy Creek in a modified form) was followed by the Mound Builders of the Hamilton focus of the Middle Valley Aspect (similar to the Adena and Copena). The Hamilton focus is a Late Woodland culture. This group made pottery of the Late Woodland Hamilton Cord-Marked and Plain types, with pottery clay tempered with limestone. Five burial mounds of 173 bodies and the presence of river-mussel shells are attributed to the Late Woodland period habitations. Conical burial mounds were used from the Late Woodland period to around 1200 in the Early Mississippian period.

== Excavation ==
Hiwassee Island was excavated between 1937 and 1939 by the Works Progress Administration (WPA). The goal was to determine if site was an important archaeological site prior to the construction of Tennessee Valley Authority (TVA) reservoirs along the Tennessee River.

Madeline Kneberg and Thomas M.N. Lewis, archaeologists from the University of Tennessee supervised the excavation. Lewis began the study as an apprentice of W. C. McKern at the Milwaukee Public Museum. Madeline D. Kneberg, a physical anthropologist, was supervisor at the University of Tennessee Knoxville main laboratory. At the time, she was also a student at the University of Chicago of archaeologist Fay-Cooper Cole. A summary of the excavation was included in a "landmark publication in Mississippian studies". In the late 1990s a field school was conducted on the island and additional cultural artifacts were found by Lynne P. Sullivan, a research professor and curator at the McClung Museum of Natural History and Culture at the University of Tennessee-Knoxville.

In 2016, a geophysical survey conduction by the TVA identified up to seven palisade features from the Mississippian village. Data from this and other studies were used to determine that the site is eligible for listing in the National Register of Historic Places. In 2017, the TVA returned to validate the survey findings and to carbon date archaeological findings. Five Native American tribes participated in the studies: Chickasaw Nation, Eastern Band of Cherokee Indians, Muscogee (Creek) Nation of Oklahoma, Sac and Fox Nation in Oklahoma, and the United Keetoowah Band of Cherokee Indians. It is a rare historical site that was not totally submerged by the TVA project in 1940.

The Hiwassee Island Site (127MG31) is the name of the archaeological site. Within the site, there are Earth mounds (one of which is 37MG31). Within the mounds were structures that were covered over with soil, one of which was a 34 by 30 feet rectangular building. A trench-style water feature was uncovered on the island that is approximately 350 by 75 feet. Artifacts are held at the McClung Museum of Natural History and Culture at the University of Tennessee-Knoxville.

== Tennessee Valley Authority ==
In 1940, the Chickamauga Dam on the Tennessee River was completed. As a result, about one half of the island was submerged. The island is owned by the United States government, under the stewardship of the Tennessee Valley Authority (TVA).

== Hiwassee Wildlife Refuge ==
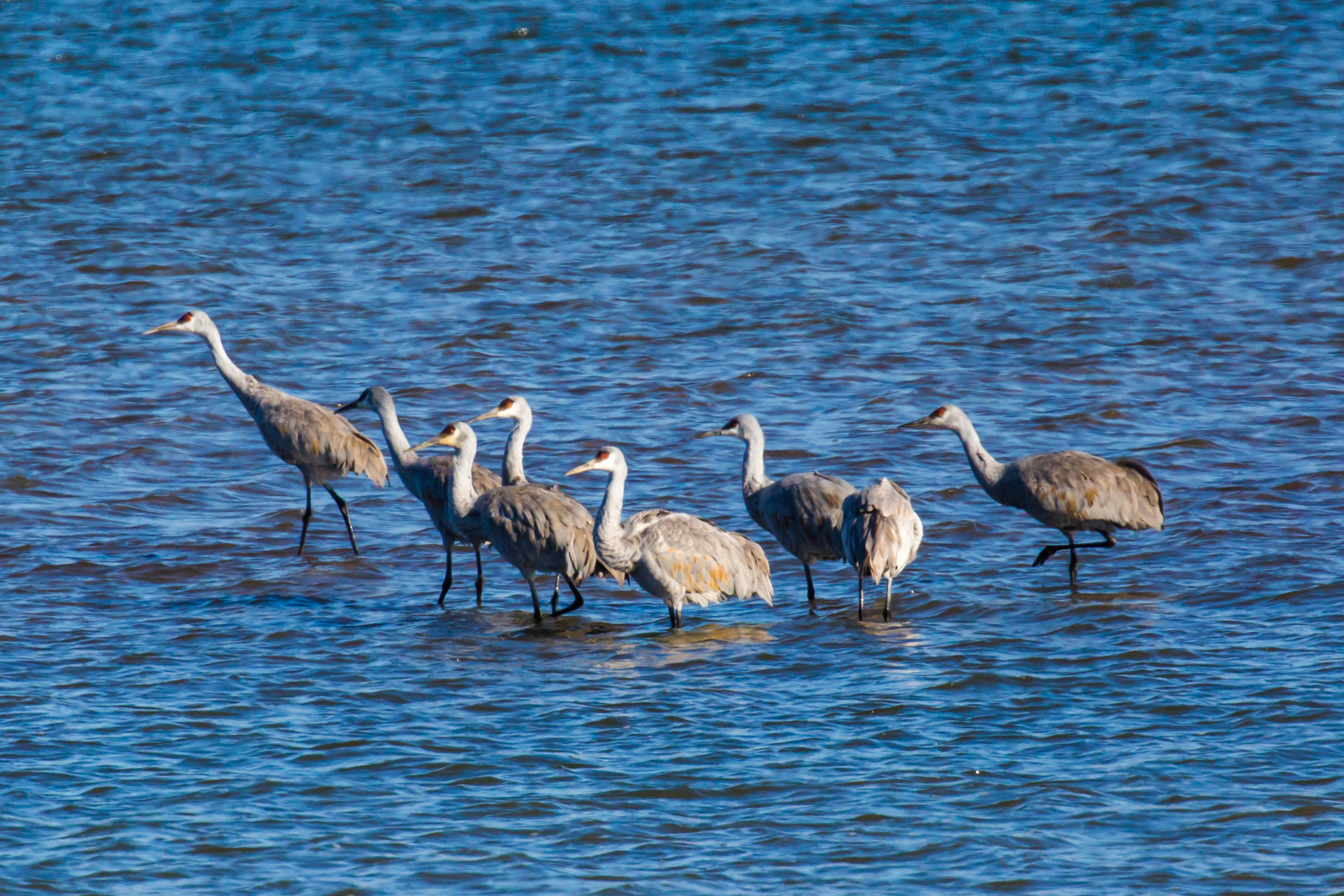
Sandhill cranes, Tennessee

An easement has been provided for the management of wildlife by the Tennessee Wildlife Resource Agency (TWRA). It is a sanctuary for sandhill cranes, which are very tall white birds with black tips on their wings.

The TWRA planted corn on Hiwassee Wildlife Refuge, which is close to the island, to attract Canada geese for hunting. They attracted 20,000 sandhill cranes each winter. They stopped planting corn, and the island remains a stopover for up to 5,000 cranes as they fly south for the winter. The endangered birds are sacred to some Native Americans. There are now less than 1,000 birds found on the island.

Large white pelicans have often stopped over on their spring voyages to Yellowstone National Park and their southern trips to the Gulf Coast. They may stay on the island during warmer winters.

== See also ==
- Blythe Ferry
- Black drink ceremonies were conducted by Native Americans at the island
- East Tennessee § Native Americans
- List of archaeological sites in Tennessee

== Sources ==
- Cordell, Linda S.; Lightfoot, Kent; McManamon, Francis; Milner, George (December 30, 2008). Archaeology in America: An Encyclopedia. ABC-CLIO. ISBN 978-0-313-02189-3.
- King, Duane H. (2005). The Cherokee Indian Nation: A Troubled History. University of Tennessee Press. ISBN 978-1-57233-451-9.
