= Ocoee, Tennessee =

Unincorporated community in Polk County, Tennessee

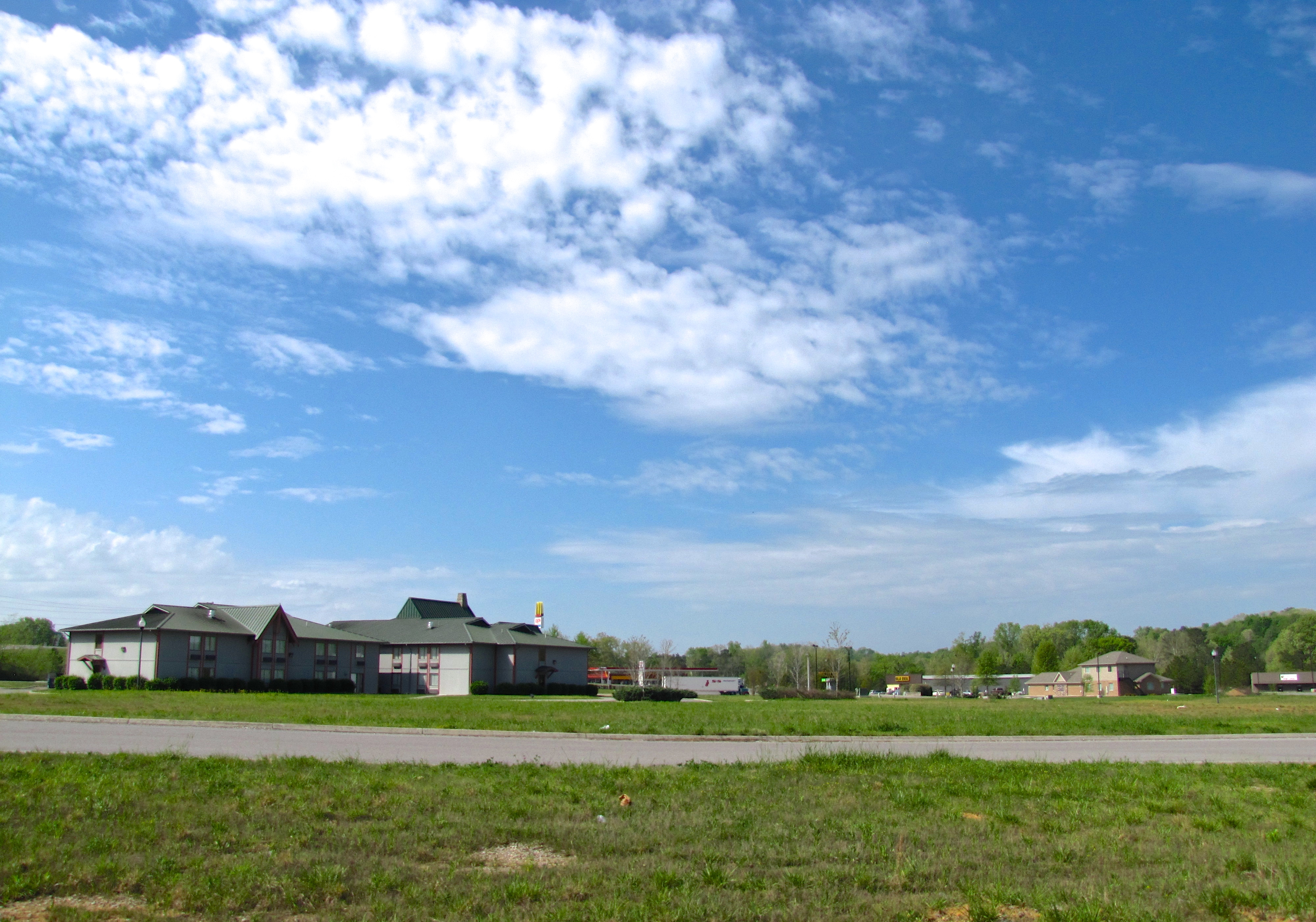
Businesses in Ocoee

Ocoee (Cherokee: ᎤᏩᎪᎯ, romanized: Uwagohi) is an unincorporated community in Polk County, Tennessee, United States and named after the Cherokee settlement located in the area. Ocoee had a post office until it was severely damaged by a tornado. It still retains its own ZIP code 37361.

== Geography ==
Its elevation is 797 feet (243 m), and it is located at 35°7′28″N 84°43′6″W (35.1245194, -84.7181327). Ocoee is located at the intersection of US 64/US 74 and US 411. The Ocoee River flows nearby.

== Economy ==
Ocoee's economy is fueled by the Cherokee National Forest and the Ocoee River, which is known for its whitewater rafting. The upper section of the Ocoee was home to the 1996 Olympics slalom racing event.

On November 30, 2016, an EF3 tornado touched down in Ocoee, causing two deaths and severe damage to the post office, the volunteer fire department and a shop.
