= Bradley County, Tennessee =

County in Tennessee, United States

- County
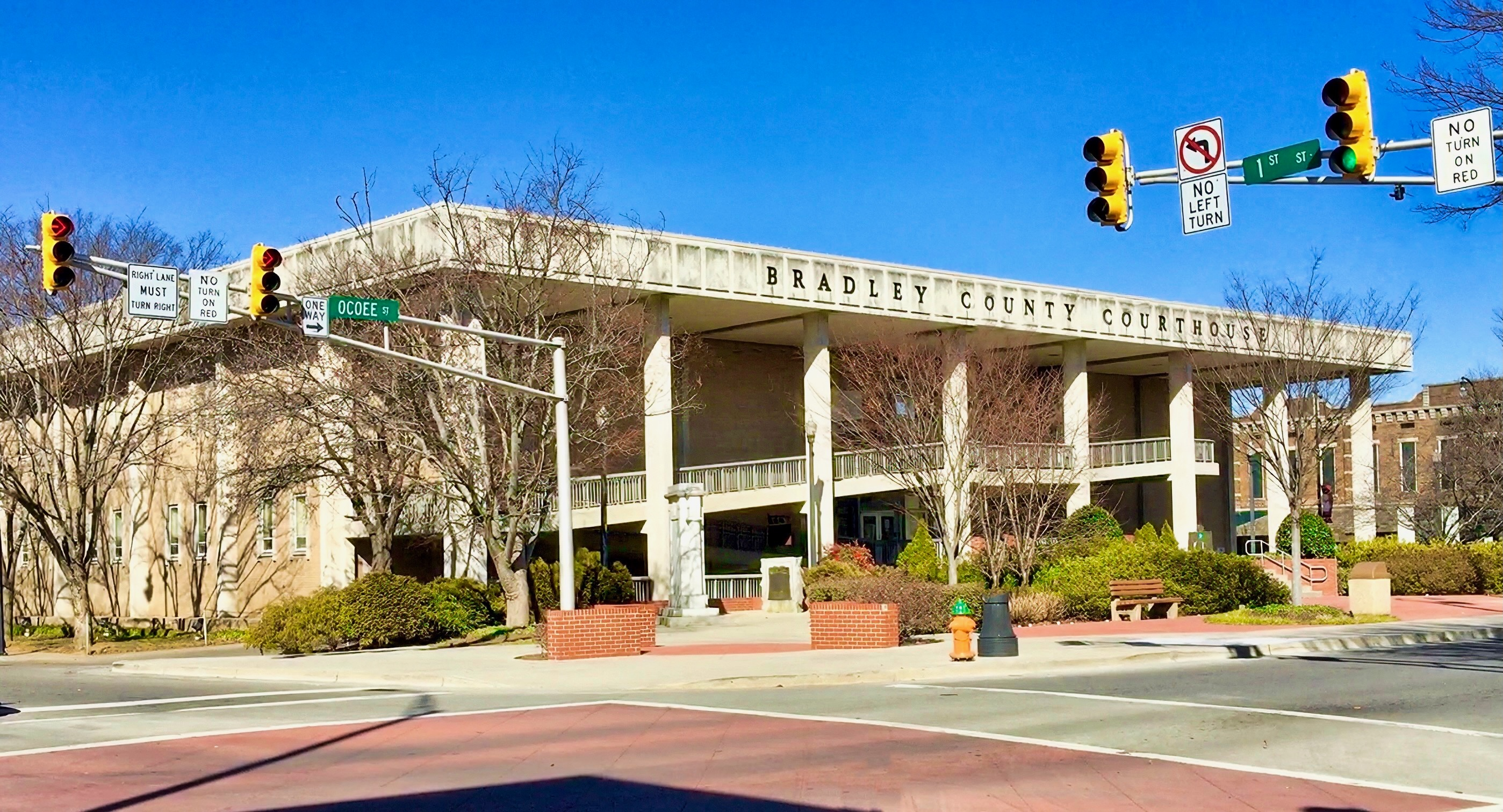
- Bradley County Courthouse in Cleveland

- Seal
- Motto: "Agriculture and Industry"
- Location within the U.S. state of Tennessee
- Coordinates: 35°09′N 84°52′W
- Country: United States
- State: Tennessee
- Founded: May 2, 1836
- Named for: Edward Bradley, state legislator
- Seat: Cleveland
- Largest city: Cleveland

Area
  - Total: 331 sq mi (860 km^{2})
  - Land: 329 sq mi (850 km^{2})
  - Water: 2.7 sq mi (7.0 km^{2}) 0.8%

Population (2020)
  - Total: 108,620
  - Estimate (2025): 115,465 ▲
  - Density: 330.15/sq mi (127.47/km^{2})
- Time zone: UTC−5 (Eastern)
  - Summer (DST): UTC−4 (EDT)
- ZIP Codes: 37310, 37311, 37312, 37320, 37323, 37353, 37364
- Congressional district: 3rd
- Website: www.bradleycountytn.gov

Bradley County is a county located in the southeastern portion of the U.S. state of Tennessee. As of the 2020 census, the population was 108,620, making it the thirteenth most populous county in Tennessee. Its county seat is Cleveland. It is named for Colonel Edward Bradley of Shelby County, Tennessee, who was colonel of Hale's Regiment in the American Revolution and the 15th Regiment of the Tennessee Volunteers in the War of 1812. Bradley County is included in the Cleveland, Tennessee metropolitan area, which is also included in the Chattanooga Metropolitan Statistical Area.

== History ==
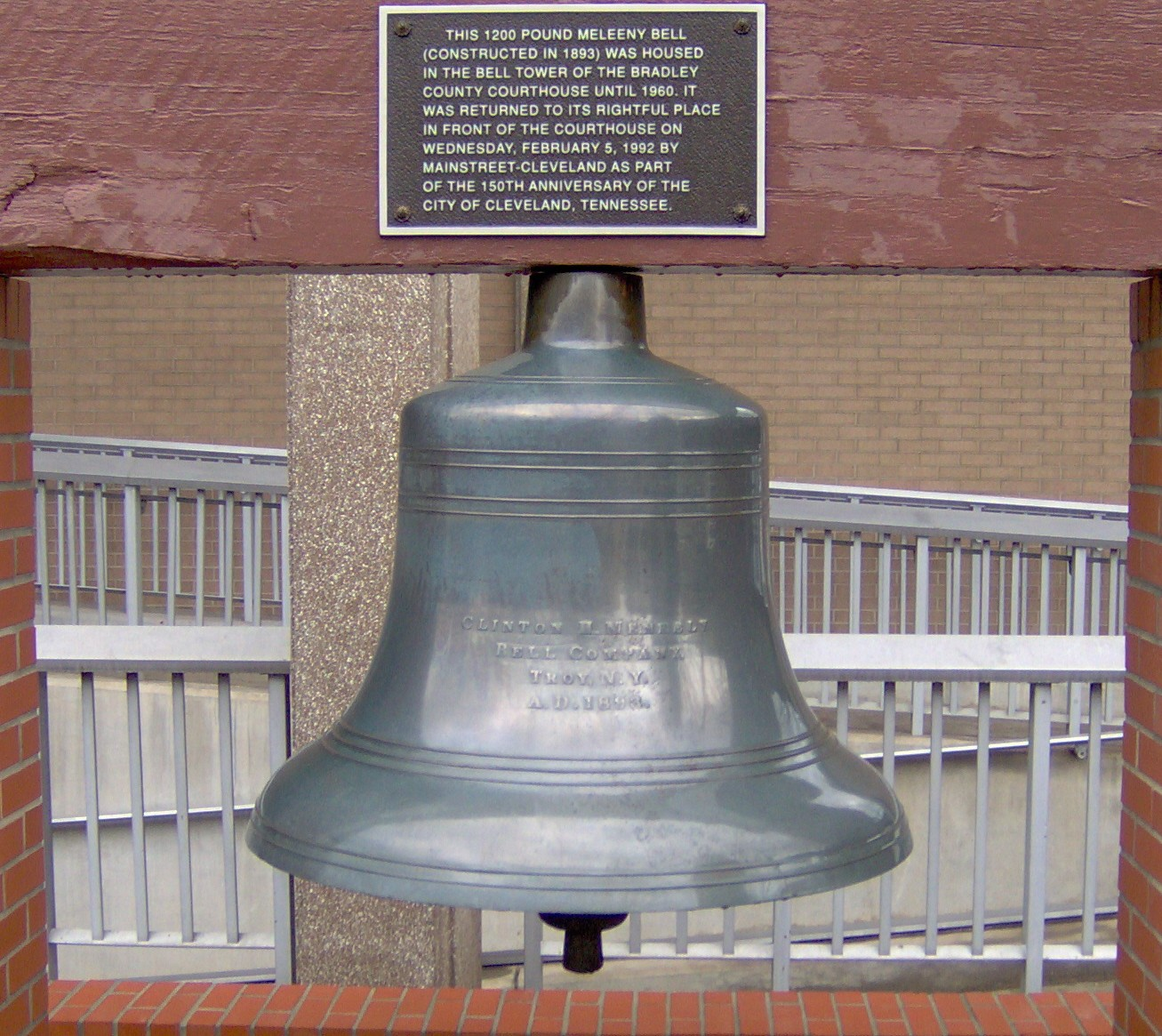
Meeleny Bell, located on the former Bradley County Courthouse from 1893 to 1963.

Indigenous peoples occupied this territory, especially along the waterways, for thousands of years before European contact. The first Europeans to see this area were likely Hernando De Soto and his expedition on June 2, 1540, while traveling through the Southeast interior of the North American continent. They encountered peoples of the South Appalachian Mississippian culture.

The historic Muscogee Creek and Yuchi occupied areas of what became Tennessee. The Yuchi town of Chestowee was located on the south bank of the lower Hiwassee River. They later moved from Tennessee into Georgia and South Carolina under pressure from the Cherokee, who were rising to power in the region. Cherokee warriors from the Middle Towns destroyed Chestowee in 1714, encouraged by English fur traders from South Carolina. Archeological surveys suggest that Chestowee was located at what is known as the Rymer archeological site, identified in later studies as within the European-American J.P. Rymer farm.

The Cherokee became predominant in this area and referred to a large region in present-day Bradley County as Chatata, meaning "clear water". The Yuchi, while speaking a different language, allied with the Muscogee Creek when moving into their territory in Georgia and Alabama.

In anticipation of forced removal of the Cherokee by treaty cession in this area north of the Hiwassee River, white settlers began to move here. In 1821, the Cherokee Agency, the official liaison between the U.S. Government and the Cherokee Nation, was moved to present-day Charleston, Tennessee. Between 1832 and 1838, the Cherokee moved their capital to the Red Clay Council Grounds, on the southern border of Bradley County with Georgia; it served as the Cherokee capital and the last council grounds of the Cherokee Nation-East. This property is now a state park, Red Clay State Park.

The Cherokee Removal began after some of their leaders signed the Treaty of New Echota, signed on December 29, 1835. The government had earlier tried to persuade them to move to Indian Territory; these leaders signed the treaty while trying to gain the best conditions for their people, as they believed it was inevitable.

General Winfield Scott was directed to remove the Cherokee from the Southeast, and set up the headquarters at Fort Cass in Charleston. Several internment camps were established in Bradley County in the valleys between Charleston and Cleveland, Tennessee, where the Cherokee were held in preparation for the journey westward. This became known as the Trail of Tears. Two of the largest internment camps were located at Rattlesnake Springs.

=== European-American development ===
Bradley County was established by the legislature on February 10, 1836. It was named to honor Colonel Edward Bradley who served in the War of 1812. The first election in Bradley County took place on April 2, 1836. On May 2, 1836, the location for the county seat of Cleveland was chosen. On January 20, 1838, Cleveland, which had a population of 400, was formally recognized by the state legislature as the seat of Bradley County. Cleveland was incorporated on February 2, 1842.

Like most East Tennessee counties, the voters of Bradley County were largely opposed to secession on the eve of the Civil War. In Tennessee's Ordinance of Secession referendum on June 8, 1861, the county's residents voted against secession, 1,382 to 507. No major battles were fought in Bradley County, but several major skirmishes between Union and Confederate troops took place there. In 1864, Confederate soldiers failed in an attempt to destroy a Union train near the Tasso community, an effort that resulted in destroying a Confederate train instead.

The bridge over the Hiwassee River was burned on November 8, 1861, by members of the East Tennessee bridge-burning conspiracy led by Alfred Cate. On November 4, 1862, a train accident south of Cleveland near the Black Fox community killed 17 members of the 33rd Regiment Alabama Infantry, who were being transported to Chattanooga. Union soldiers under the command of William Tecumseh Sherman camped at Cleveland, Tasso, and Blue Springs on multiple occasions during the latter half of the war. The city of Cleveland was occupied by the Confederate Army from 1861 to 1863.

== Geography ==
According to the U.S. Census Bureau, the county has a total area of 331 square miles (860 km^{2}), of which 329 square miles (850 km^{2}) is land and 2.7 square miles (7.0 km^{2}) (0.8%) is water. The county is situated on a series of paralleling ridges running north-northeasterly which are part of the Ridge and Valley Appalachians. The highest of these, Candies Creek Ridge, runs through the center of Cleveland. Located in between these ridges are creeks, and there are several springs in the county, which made the area favorable to early settlers. The highest point in the county is located on the Hamilton County line along White Oak Mountain. The county is bordered on the north by the Hiwassee River. The majority of the county is located in the Tennessee Valley drainage basin, except for approximately the southeastern third, which is located in the Mobile Bay Watershed and contains the Conasauga River. This river is the only river in Tennessee that is not part of the Mississippi River Watershed.

=== Adjacent counties ===
- Meigs County (northwest)
- McMinn County (north)
- Polk County (east)
- Murray County, Georgia (southeast)
- Whitfield County, Georgia (south)
- Hamilton County (west)

=== State protected areas ===
- Chickamauga Wildlife Management Area (part)
- Charlotte Anne Finnell Neal Wildlife Management Area
- Red Clay State Park

== Demographics ==
Historical population
Census	Pop.	Note	%±
1840	7,385		—
1850	12,259		66.0%
1860	11,701		−4.6%
1870	11,652		−0.4%
1880	12,124		4.1%
1890	13,607		12.2%
1900	15,759		15.8%
1910	16,336		3.7%
1920	18,652		14.2%
1930	22,870		22.6%
1940	28,498		24.6%
1950	32,338		13.5%
1960	38,324		18.5%
1970	50,686		32.3%
1980	67,547		33.3%
1990	73,712		9.1%
2000	87,965		19.3%
2010	98,963		12.5%
2020	108,620		9.8%
2025 (est.)	115,465	▲	6.3%
U.S. Decennial Census; 1790-1960 1900-1990; 1990-2000 2010-2020

=== 2020 census ===
As of the 2020 census, the county had a population of 108,620. The median age was 39.7 years, with 21.8% of residents under the age of 18 and 17.7% aged 65 or older.

For every 100 females there were 94.0 males, and for every 100 females age 18 and over there were 91.4 males age 18 and over.

The racial makeup of the county was 82.4% White, 4.8% Black or African American, 0.4% American Indian and Alaska Native, 1.1% Asian, 0.1% Native Hawaiian and Pacific Islander, 3.6% from some other race, and 7.5% from two or more races. Hispanic or Latino residents of any race comprised 7.8% of the population.

68.1% of residents lived in urban areas, while 31.9% lived in rural areas.

There were 41,847 households in the county, of which 30.6% had children under the age of 18 living in them. Of all households, 49.9% were married-couple households, 17.0% were households with a male householder and no spouse or partner present, and 26.7% were households with a female householder and no spouse or partner present. About 25.5% of all households were made up of individuals and 11.1% had someone living alone who was 65 years of age or older.

There were 44,781 housing units, of which 6.6% were vacant. Among occupied housing units, 64.3% were owner-occupied and 35.7% were renter-occupied. The homeowner vacancy rate was 1.3% and the rental vacancy rate was 6.1%. The census counted 26,516 families residing in the county.

=== Racial and ethnic composition ===
Bradley County, Tennessee – Racial and ethnic composition Note: the US Census treats Hispanic/Latino as an ethnic category. This table excludes Latinos from the racial categories and assigns them to a separate category. Hispanics/Latinos may be of any race.
Race / Ethnicity (NH = Non-Hispanic)	Pop 1980	Pop 1990	Pop 2000	Pop 2010	Pop 2020	% 1980	% 1990	% 2000	% 2010	% 2020
White alone (NH)	63,900	69,704	80,917	87,589	87,830	94.60%	94.56%	91.99%	88.51%	80.86%
Black or African American alone (NH)	2,662	2,871	3,481	4,116	5,105	3.94%	3.89%	3.96%	4.16%	4.70%
Native American or Alaska Native alone (NH)	168	191	220	247	271	0.25%	0.26%	0.25%	0.25%	0.25%
Asian alone (NH)	163	222	489	821	1,188	0.24%	0.30%	0.56%	0.83%	1.09%
Native Hawaiian or Pacific Islander alone (NH)	x	x	12	45	117	x	x	0.01%	0.05%	0.11%
Other race alone (NH)	80	12	72	112	348	0.12%	0.02%	0.08%	0.11%	0.32%
Mixed race or Multiracial (NH)	x	x	952	1,369	5,300	x	x	1.08%	1.38%	4.88%
Hispanic or Latino (any race)	574	712	1,822	4,664	8,461	0.85%	0.97%	2.07%	4.71%	7.79%
Total	67,547	73,712	87,965	98,963	108,620	100.00%	100.00%	100.00%	100.00%	100.00%

=== 2010 census ===
As of the census of 2010, there were 98,963 people, 37,947 households, and 26,867 families residing in the county. The population density was 298.98 persons per square mile. There were 41,395 housing units at an average density of 125.06 per square mile. The racial makeup of the county was 92.10% White, 4.27% Black or African American, 0.33% Native American, 0.86% Asian, 0.06% Native Hawaiian or Pacific Islander, and 1.45% from two or more races. Hispanics or Latinos (of any race) were 4.71% of the population. The largest ancestral groups were Irish 14.27%, German 12.62%, English 8.91%, Italian 2.39%, and Dutch 2.18%. An estimated 3.90% of the population was foreign-born, and an estimated 7.54% were veterans.

Of all of the households, 29.07% had children under the age of 18 living in them, 53.58% were married couples living together, 4.78% had a male householder with no wife present, 12.44% had a female householder with no husband present, and 29.2% were non-family households, with 23.8% of householders living alone. 33.27% of all households had individuals under the age of 18 living in them, and 26.36% had individuals aged 65 and older living in them. The average household size was 2.54 persons, and the average family size was 2.98 persons.

The population was spread out, with 22.97% under the age of 18, 62.88% ages 18 to 64, and 14.15% over the age of 65. The median age was 37.9 years. 51.32% of the population was female and 48.68% was male.

The median household income was $40,032, and the average per capita income was approximately $21,444. Males had a median income of $37,735 versus $28,585 for females. Approximately 11.6% of families and 16.0% of the population were below the poverty line, including 20.2% of those under the age of 18 and 10.8% of those age 65 or over.

== Economy ==
With thirteen Fortune 500 manufacturers, Cleveland has the fifth largest industrial economy in Tennessee. Cleveland is home to a variety of industries, including household cooking equipment, foodstuff, textiles, furniture, storage batteries, pharmaceuticals, industrial cleaning products, photographic processing, industrial and domestic chemicals, and automotive parts. Major employers include Whirlpool, Johnston Coca-Cola, Mars, Incorporated, Procter & Gamble, Duracell, Hardwick Clothes, and Cleveland Chair Company. Wacker Polysilicon, Olin Corporation, Amazon, and Arch Chemicals have factories and distribution centers in Charleston. Resolute Forest Products, formerly Bowater, has a plant across the river from Charleston in Calhoun.

Agriculture in Bradley County has an annual market value of over $105 million. Bradley County ranks second in the state for the production of poultry and broilers, most of which is raised in the southern half of the county. Bradley County is also home to farms which raise beef cattle, dairy, and crops, such as corn, soybeans, and fruits and vegetables.

== Government ==
United States presidential election results for Bradley County, Tennessee
Year	Republican		Democratic		Third party(ies)	
Year	No.	%	No.	%	No.	%
1880	932	53.62%	665	38.26%	141	8.11%
1884	1,304	58.95%	892	40.33%	16	0.72%
1888	1,518	59.72%	991	38.99%	33	1.30%
1892	1,522	60.52%	871	34.63%	122	4.85%
1896	1,725	60.91%	1,057	37.32%	50	1.77%
1900	1,579	61.68%	909	35.51%	72	2.81%
1904	1,242	62.85%	701	35.48%	33	1.67%
1908	1,063	62.02%	620	36.17%	31	1.81%
1912	485	28.73%	645	38.21%	558	33.06%
1916	1,482	64.72%	784	34.24%	24	1.05%
1920	2,255	67.33%	1,058	31.59%	36	1.07%
1924	1,779	63.13%	999	35.45%	40	1.42%
1928	2,854	75.70%	913	24.22%	3	0.08%
1932	1,570	54.10%	1,295	44.62%	37	1.27%
1936	2,561	47.64%	2,806	52.19%	9	0.17%
1940	2,617	56.71%	1,976	42.82%	22	0.48%
1944	2,616	66.21%	1,312	33.21%	23	0.58%
1948	2,942	57.10%	2,036	39.52%	174	3.38%
1952	4,606	63.36%	2,646	36.40%	17	0.23%
1956	6,247	65.00%	3,225	33.56%	139	1.45%
1960	7,865	69.69%	3,307	29.30%	113	1.00%
1964	6,717	54.13%	5,693	45.87%	0	0.00%
1968	6,924	50.01%	2,762	19.95%	4,159	30.04%
1972	10,440	77.26%	2,804	20.75%	269	1.99%
1976	9,136	50.61%	8,776	48.62%	139	0.77%
1980	11,869	59.63%	7,638	38.37%	398	2.00%
1984	16,322	72.54%	6,085	27.04%	95	0.42%
1988	15,829	71.85%	6,122	27.79%	80	0.36%
1992	16,528	55.66%	9,889	33.30%	3,279	11.04%
1996	15,478	58.13%	9,095	34.16%	2,055	7.72%
2000	20,167	68.50%	8,768	29.78%	508	1.73%
2004	25,951	72.82%	9,431	26.46%	255	0.72%
2008	28,333	74.19%	9,357	24.50%	501	1.31%
2012	27,422	75.97%	8,037	22.27%	637	1.76%
2016	29,768	76.99%	7,070	18.28%	1,828	4.73%
2020	35,204	76.76%	9,851	21.48%	810	1.77%
2024	38,836	78.86%	9,852	20.01%	558	1.13%

Bradley County has a 14-member county commission form of government, with two commissioners from each of seven districts. The commission is headed by a chairman and vice chairman, who are chosen by fellow commissioners. The current chairman is Tom Crye from District 2 and the current vice chairman is Bill Winters from District 7. Each district is also assigned a constable, also elected. The county executive (or "county mayor") separately elected, is Republican D. Gary Davis. Other elected officials include county clerk, circuit and criminal court clerk, register of deeds, assessor of property, trustee, and road superintendent. Elections take place every even year, with primaries in the first week of May and general elections in the first week of August, along with the state primary.

District	Seat A	Seat B
District 1	Daniel Beaty	Mike Hughes
District 2	Louie Alford	Tom Crye
District 3	Milan Blake	Denny Collins
District 4	Scott Gilbert	Howard Thompson
District 5	Bobby Goins	Cindy Slater
District 6	Tim Mason	Tommy Ledford
District 7	Josh Rogers	Bill Winters

Bradley County is located in Tennessee's 3rd congressional district, represented by Republican Chuck Fleischmann. For the Tennessee House of Representatives, Bradley County is part of both District 22, represented by Republican Dan Howell, and District 24, represented by Republican Kevin Raper. Bradley County is represented in the Tennessee Senate, by Republican J. Adam Lowe

Cleveland and Bradley County have always been majority-Republican, as has most of East Tennessee, even when Tennessee was part of the Solid South. Since the Republican Party's founding, only two Democratic Presidential Candidates have won Bradley County; Woodrow Wilson in 1912 and Franklin Delano Roosevelt in 1936. In both the 2000 and 2004 Presidential elections, the Republican candidate received the highest percentage of the popular vote in Bradley County out of all of Tennessee's counties.

== Infrastructure ==
=== Transportation ===
==== Air ====
Hardwick Field, also known as Cleveland Municipal Airport, was the county's principal airport from 1955 to 2013. Cleveland Regional Jetport, located approximately two miles east of Hardwick Field opened on January 25, 2013, replacing Hardwick Field. It consists of a 6,200-by-100-foot (1,890 by 30 m) runway.

==== Rail ====
The county is served by the Norfolk Southern Railway, which forks in Cleveland and provides logistics for industries.

==== Highways ====
Interstate 75 traverses the county from the southwest to the north, passing through the western edge of Cleveland. There are four exits on I-75 in Bradley County: three in Cleveland and one in Charleston. U.S. Route 11 and U.S. Route 64 intersect in downtown Cleveland. U.S. 11 connects to Chattanooga to the southwest and Athens to the north. U.S. 64 connects to Murphy, North Carolina to the east. S.R. 60 connects Cleveland to Dayton to the northwest and Dalton, Georgia to the south. APD-40, made up of the U.S. 64 Bypass and a section of S.R. 60 forms a beltway and bypass route around the business district of Cleveland. The U.S. 11 Bypass bypasses downtown Cleveland to the west.

===== Principal highways =====
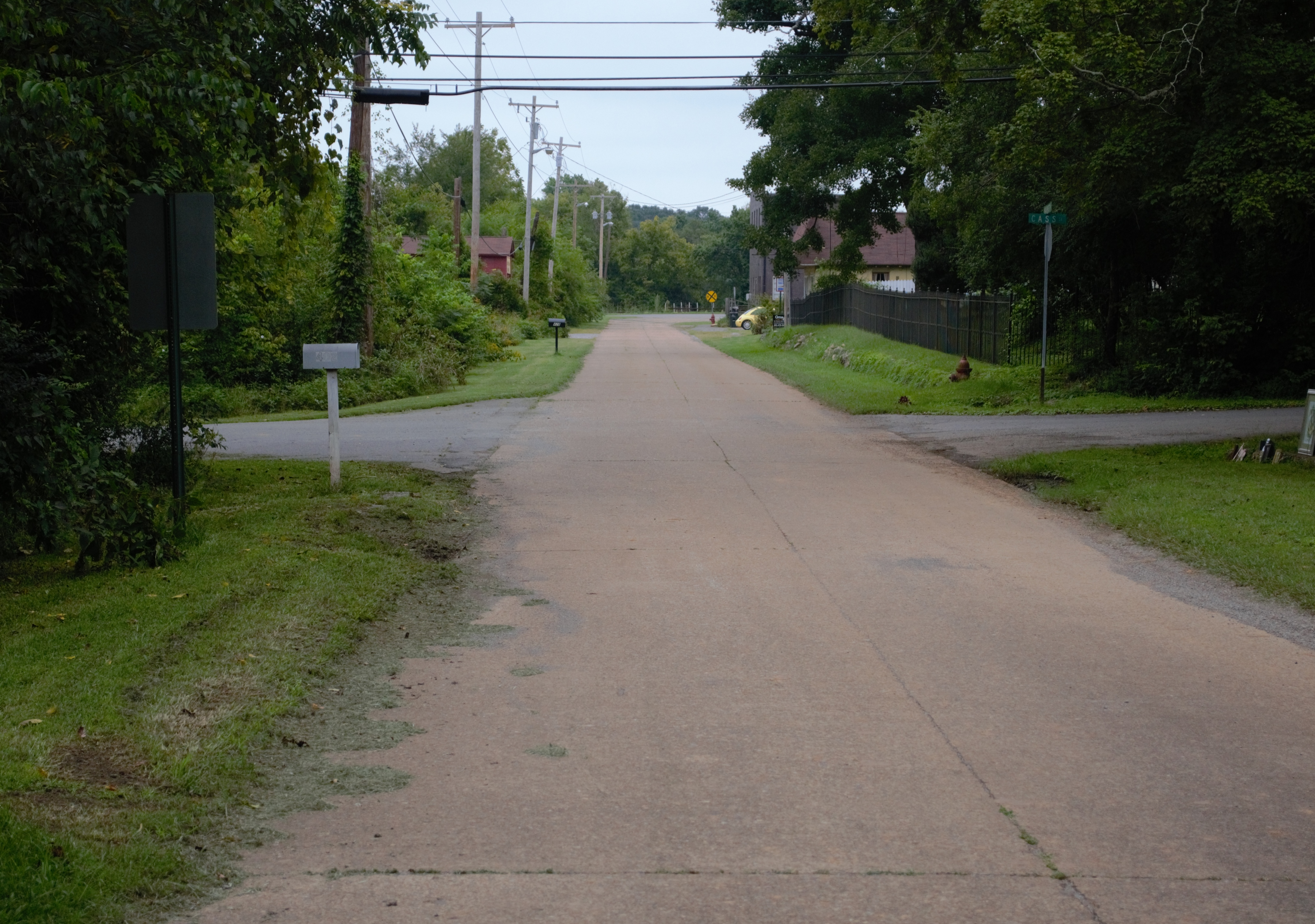
Historic U.S. Route 11 in Charleston.

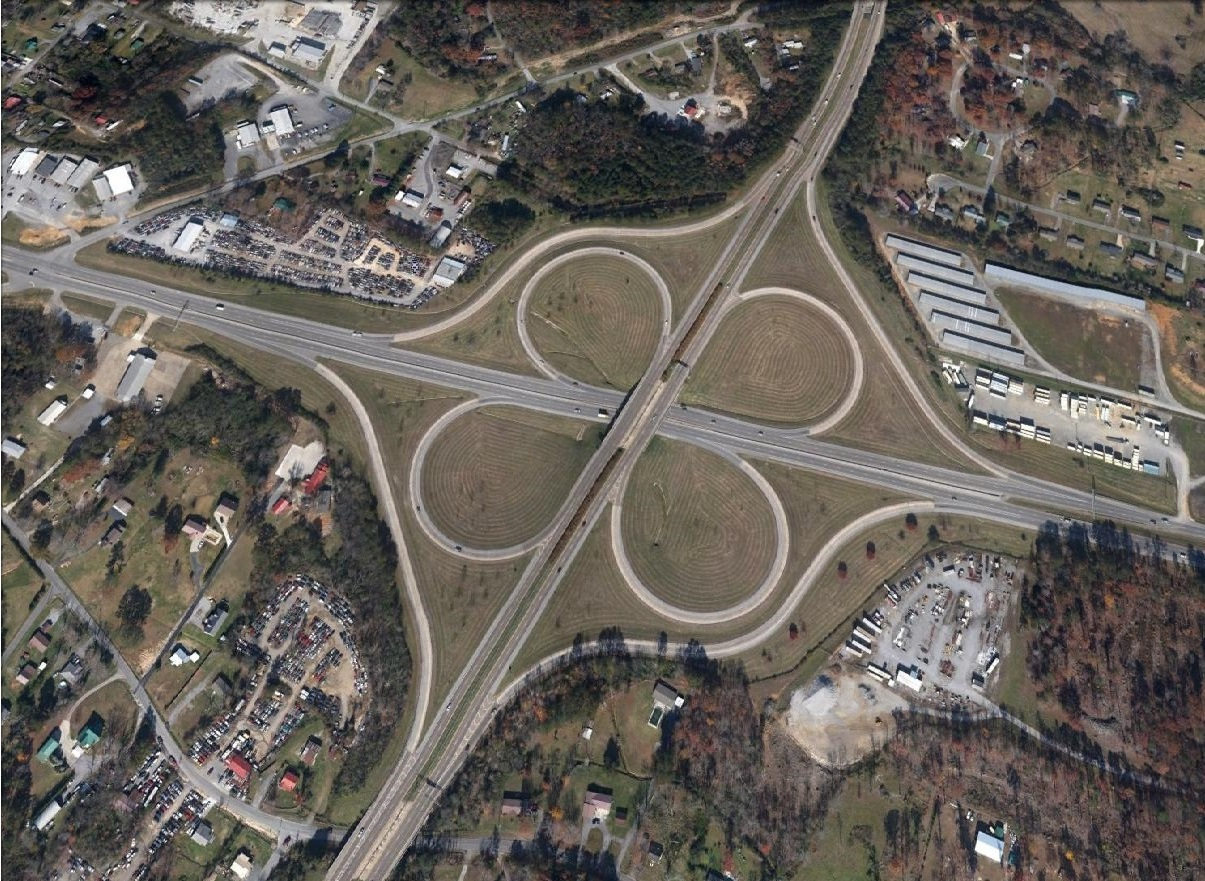
Aerial view of the cloverleaf interchange of APD-40 (U.S. 64 Byp./S.R. 60) and U.S. Route 64 (Inman Street/Waterlevel Highway).

- Interstate 75
- U.S. Route 11
- U.S. Route 11 Bypass
- U.S. Route 64
- U.S. Route 64 Bypass
- U.S. Route 74
- S.R. 60
- S.R. 40
- S.R. 2
- S.R. 311
- Paul Huff Parkway

===== Secondary highways =====
- S.R. 74
- S.R. 306
- S.R. 308
- S.R. 312
- S.R. 313
- S.R. 317

=== Utilities ===
Cleveland Utilities is a city-owned corporation which provides electricity, water, and sewer service to the city of Cleveland and surrounding areas. The Calhoun-Charleston Utilities District provides water to Charleston. Volunteer Electric Cooperative (VEC) provides electricity to Charleston and the rest of Bradley County, except for a small portion in the southwestern part of the county along U.S. 11/64, including McDonald, which receives its electricity from Chattanooga-based EPB. The rest of the county is provided water by the Hiwassee Utilities Commission, Ocoee Utility District, Eastside Utility District, and Savannah Valley Utility District. Cleveland Utilities, VEC, and EPB all purchase their power from the Tennessee Valley Authority (TVA), which also provides power directly to heavy industries Olin, United Hydrogen, and Wacker. Chattanooga Gas, a subsidiary of Southern Company, provides natural gas to Cleveland and surrounding areas.

=== Healthcare ===
Prior to 2008, the county's two main hospitals were Bradley Memorial Hospital and Cleveland Community Hospital. They ran independently until 2008 when they were both purchased by SkyRidge Medical Center. In 2015, the two hospitals were purchased by Tennova Healthcare. Bradley Healthcare & Rehabilitation Center is a nursing home that serves the county. Bradley County Emergency Medical Services is an emergency medical service (EMS) agency of the county government that was established in 1972 and consists of six stations, eight ambulances, and two ancillary vehicles, along with more than 60 full-time employees and more than 25 part-time employees.

== Education ==
Cleveland State Community College and Lee University are located in Bradley County. Public schools in the county are managed by the Bradley County Schools school district or the Cleveland City Schools school district. The county district has four public high schools: Bradley Central High School, Walker Valley High School, GOAL Academy, and REACH Adult High school. Cleveland High School is operated by the city school district. There is one State-accredited private Christian college preparatory school: Tennessee Christian Preparatory School.

=== Private schools ===
- Tennessee Christian Preparatory School
- Cleveland Christian School
- Bowman Hills Adventist School
- Shenandoah Baptist Academy
- United Christian Academy
- Vanguard Christian Academy
- Bachman Academy

=== Higher education ===
- Lee University
- Cleveland State Community College
- Pentecostal Theological Seminary

== Media ==
=== Newspapers ===
The Cleveland Daily Banner is the county's primary newspaper. The paper was first published in 1854, making it one of the oldest in the state. Additionally, the Chattanooga Times Free Press, a paper based in Chattanooga, also serves as a primary source of news for Bradley County residents.

=== Radio ===
Several radio stations located within Chattanooga and neighboring cities serve Bradley County, along with others licensed to Cleveland, which are listed below:

Call sign	Frequency	Format
W207C1 (WAYW)	89.3 FM	Contemporary Christian
WSAA	93.1 FM	Air 1, Contemporary Christian
WALI	97.1	Lite rock
WOOP-LP	99.9 FM	Country
WUSY	100.7 FM	Country
W267BI	101.3 FM	Talk
WCLE-FM	104.1 FM	Adult contemporary
W290CA (WTSE)	105.9 FM	Contemporary Christian
WBAC	1340 AM	News/Talk
WCLE-AM	1570 AM	Talk

=== Television ===
Bradley County is served by several TV stations licensed both in the county and in neighboring counties. Stations licensed in Cleveland include:

Call sign	Channel	Network
WPDP-CD	25	ABC, Fox, My Network TV
WTNB-CD	27	Heartland
WFLI-TV	42, 53	The CW, Me-TV

== Communities ==
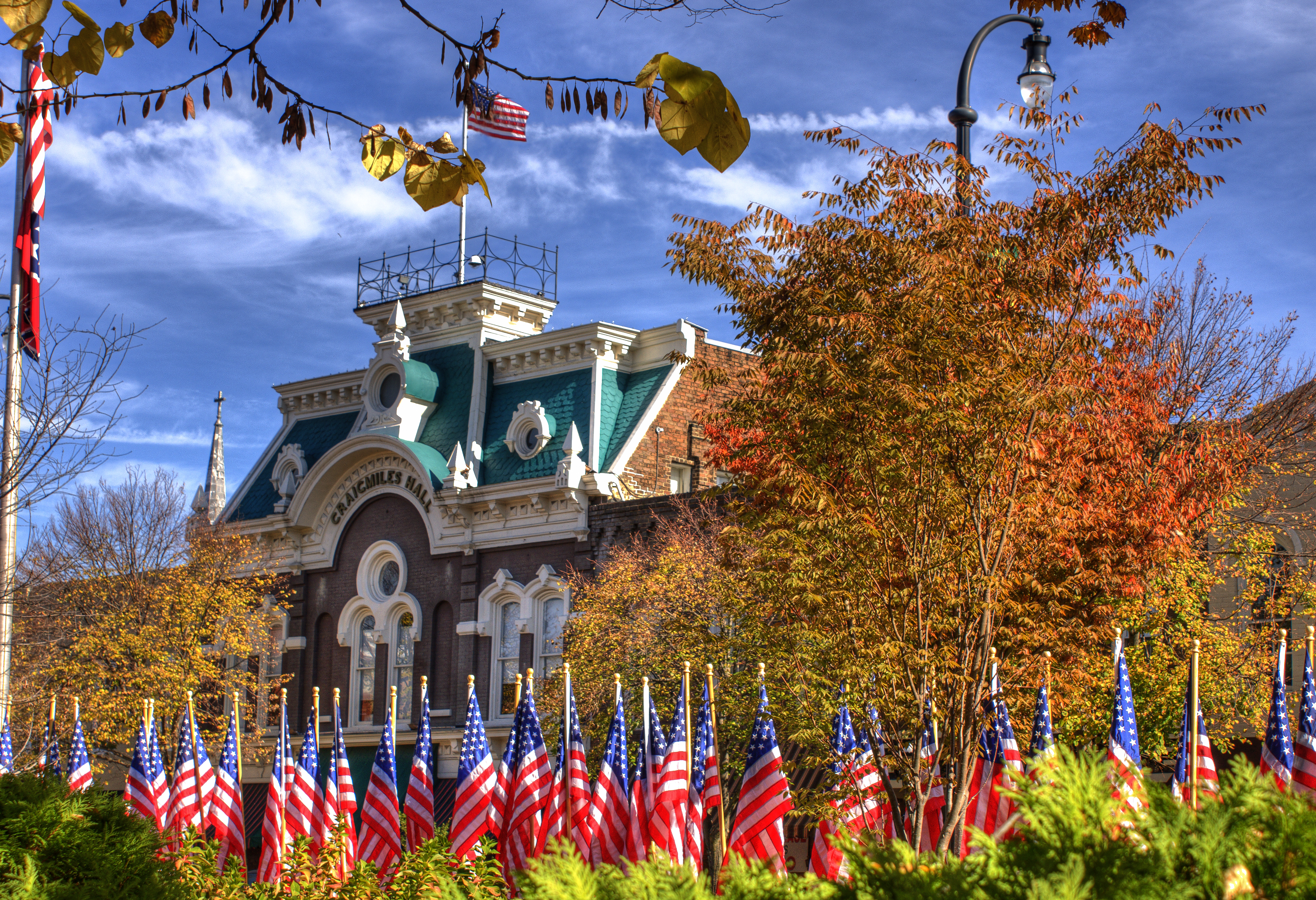
Cleveland

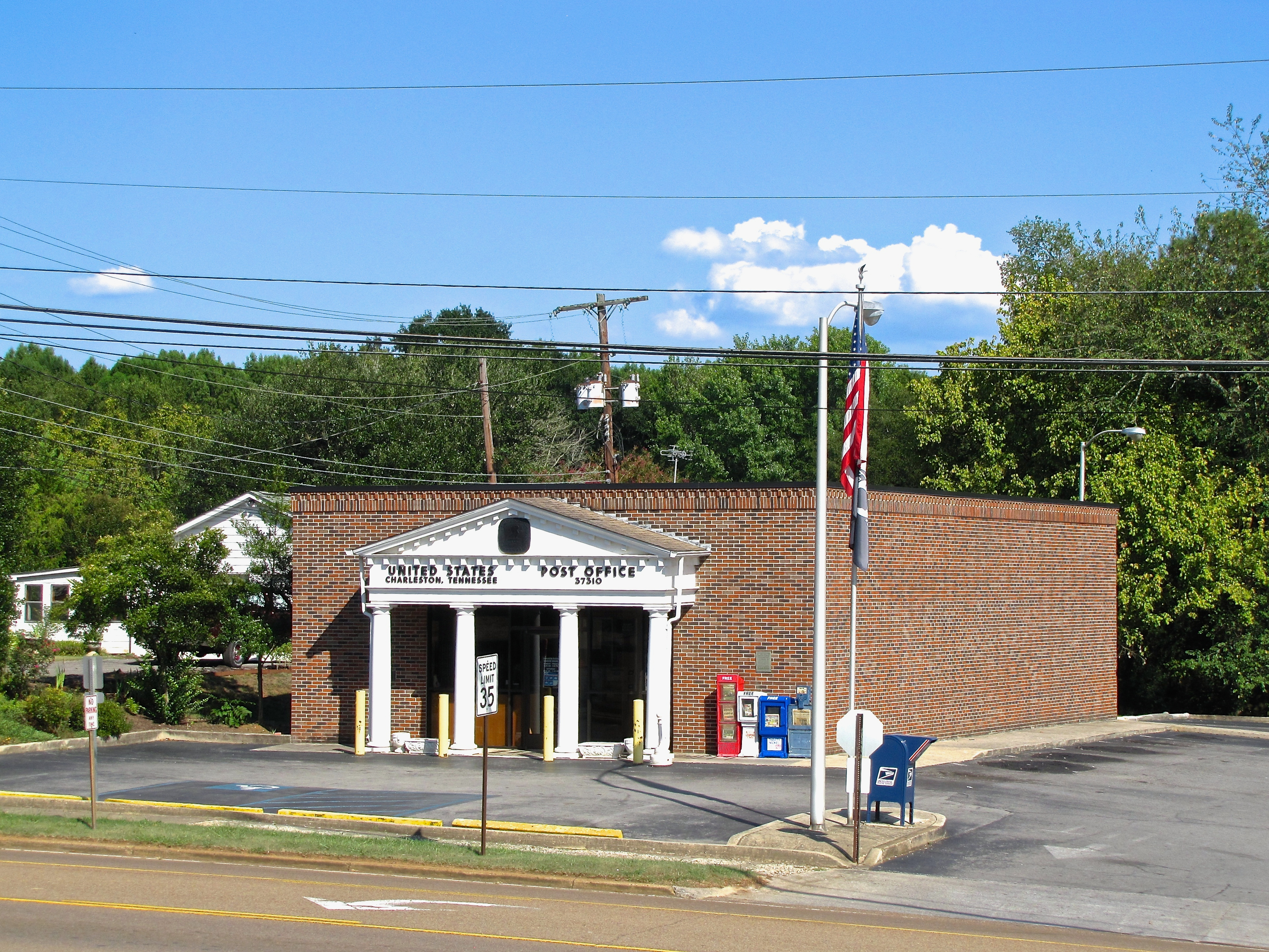
Charleston

=== Cities ===
- Cleveland (county seat)
- Charleston

=== Census-designated places ===
- East Cleveland
- Hopewell
- McDonald
- South Cleveland
- Wildwood Lake

=== Unincorporated communities ===
- Georgetown
- Misty Ridge
- Prospect
- Tasso
- Waterville

== See also ==
- Chatata
- National Register of Historic Places listings in Bradley County, Tennessee
- Red Clay State Park
