= Bachman Academy =

Location
- 414 Brymer Creek Road; McDonald, Tennessee 37353; United States
- Coordinates: 35.133078°N 84.941657°W

Information
- School type: Non-profit, College Preparatory, Specialty
- Established: 1906
- Closed: 2017
- Gender: Co-ed
- Campus size: 200 acres (0.81 km^{2})
- Colours: Burgundy, Gold, Dark Green
- Slogan: Tapping Potential...One Person at a Time
- Athletics: TSSAA
- Mascot: Warrior
- Website: http://bachmanfoundation.org/

Bachman Academy was a 6th-12th, co-ed college-preparatory boarding and day school in McDonald, Tennessee. It served to provide a non-traditional educational environment for students with learning differences, such as ADHD, Dyslexia, and NLD, but who have average to above average intelligence. It has since been re-branded as a charity that provides financial aid to students and schools called Bachman Foundation

== History ==
The school was founded in 1912 by Reverend John Lynn Bachman, pastor of the First Presbyterian Church of Sweetwater, Tennessee, as a Mission School for local children in the nearby mountain region of Farner, Tennessee. It was renamed "Lynn Bachman Memorial School." in 1916, Then, in 1925, the Jonathan W. Bachman Memorial Orphans Home was constructed on the grounds of the school, augmenting the school's mission. Over the years, the school added more cottages to the grounds.

In 1934, with the addition of a new public school system in the area, "Bachman Home" was able to refine its focus on providing a home for the children, but using the public schools for educational programs. By 1936, 34 students from Bachman Home were attending the local elementary school and 12 students were attending Ducktown High School.

In 1950, the school relocated to a site in Cleveland, Tennessee.

By 1970, the Bachman Home expanded to include caring for children who came from less fortunate families in addition to orphans. They sought to keep siblings together and to get them into foster homes or back to their own families as quickly as possible.

During the 1980s and 1990s, Bachman Home served as a transitional facility for boys referred from the Department of Corrections and the Department of Human Services, including an alternative school on campus for boys with behavioral problems or who needed additional education before returning to a traditional school setting.

In 1999, it was renamed Bachman Academy, and changed its program to one providing for both boys and girls with learning disabilities and began accepting students from other areas of the country. In 2004, the academy became a SEVIS approved school and was able to accept international students with learning differences as well. By 2011, the school has served students with learning differences from 27 states and 8 countries.

Due to sharp decline in enrollment and financial difficulties in later years, the board of trustees made the decision to close the school after the 2016–2017 school year. On May 8, 2017, parents and staff were notified that the school was closing.

== Academics ==
Bachman Academy was dually-accredited by the Southern Association of Colleges and Schools (SACS) and the Southern Association of Independent Schools (SAIS). The academy was a member of the Small Boarding Schools Association (SBSA). Academics met Tennessee state requirements. Career electives included Equestrian Science, Mechanics, Horticulture, and Woodworking.

== Athletics and extra-curriculars ==
Many extra-curricular activities were offered including clubs and sports at the school and at the local YMCA. Interscholastic sports offered included programs in cross-country running, bowling, and equestrian provided by the school, and other sports had cooperative teams with Bradley County Public Schools through the Tennessee Secondary School Athletic Association.

Many activities were planned for boarding students on weekends.
