= Tasso, Tennessee =

- Unincorporated community
- Location within Tennessee Location within the United States
- Coordinates: 35°12′42″N 84°48′15″W
- Country: United States
- State: Tennessee
- County: Bradley
- Elevation: 810 ft (250 m)
- Time zone: UTC-5 (Eastern (EST))
  - Summer (DST): UTC-4 (EDT)
- ZIP code: 37312, 37323
- Area code: 423
- GNIS feature ID: 1304009

Tasso is an unincorporated community located in Bradley County, Tennessee, approximately five miles north-northeast of the business district of Cleveland. Its coordinates are approximately 35.212 N, 84.804 W and its elevation is approximately 814 feet. It appears in the East Cleveland US Geological Survey records. Tasso is included in the Cleveland metropolitan statistical area.

== History ==
The community is part of a region once called Chatata, meaning "clear water", by the Cherokee, and has been in existence since before the American Civil War. The community was first called Fish Town, then McMillin Station, and then Chatata. The community was renamed Tasso in 1905 after an Italian poet who frequently rode the train through the community. The community once contained schools, a post office, train station, two stores, a blacksmith shop, flour mill, and a physician. The railroad was constructed through the community in 1858.

=== Civil War history ===
During the Civil War, Union troops under the command of general William T. Sherman camped directly east of Tasso and the railroad in the same valley on multiple occasions in 1863. These troops reportedly were forced to abandon at least one cannon in Little Chatata Creek south of Tasso after it got stuck in the creek bed while they were crossing. Troops under the command of Sherman also camped at the Blue Springs Encampments and Fortifications in southern Bradley County.

In the spring of 1864, during the Civil War, a group of Company C soldiers of the Confederate Army of Tennessee were camped in a field along the railroad just south of present-day Tasso when the commander received word of a train transporting approximately 2,000 Union soldiers approaching from the south, followed by a Confederate train pursuing the former. The commander ordered his soldiers to place an explosive charge on the tracks just south of the community, hoping to derail the Union train and allow them to capture the cargo, which reportedly consisted of a cache of rifles and ammunition and three cannons. The Union train failed to detonate the explosive, which was instead detonated by the Confederate train, destroying the train and killing several soldiers. The Confederate soldiers who attempted to destroy the Union train, who had been watching from a nearby hill, immediately rushed toward the wreckage only to be unexpectedly met by a large band of Union soldiers who attacked from a nearby wooded area. The Confederate soldiers immediately fled and several were killed by the Union soldiers in the process.

The Confederate train reportedly contained a cache of Confederate gold and silver coins intended for payroll that are rumored to still be buried at the site of the wreckage. Although no evidence of this has ever been found, a Confederate sword was discovered by a teenager in Little Chatata Creek adjacent to the railroad in 1970. This discovery was later followed by other artifacts from the wreckage, including mess kits, silverware, parts of boots, brass buttons, belt buckles, and a small number of coins.

== Geography ==
Tasso is mostly a residential community, located in northeastern Bradley County on the edge of a large agricultural area. Since the 1980s the city limits have greatly expanded to within a short distance of the community. Several historic Native American sites are located near the community, including Beeler Spring approximately one-half mile to the east and Rattlesnake Springs about two miles to the northeast, where 13,000 Cherokees were held in preparation for the Cherokee Removal, which became known as the Trail of Tears. Much of the area around the community remains heavily agricultural with hundreds of acres of protected land and some of the most fertile soils in Bradley County.

A Norfolk Southern Railway runs through the community, connecting the area with Cleveland to the south and Athens and Knoxville to the north and is paralleled through the community by Little Chatata Creek. No numbered highways run through Tasso, but it is served by two primary roads, Tasso Lane (which connects to US-11) and Dry Valley Road (which connects between Cleveland and Charleston). Other major roads include Old Charleston Road (also connects to Charleston), Urbane Road, and Jenkins Road. Cleveland Regional Jetport, opened in 2013, is located on the eastern border of the community. A few industries have located warehouses in Tasso including Tri-State Truss, Pratt Industries, Owens Corning, Reliance Frame & Furniture, and Cleveland Recycled Fiber. There are two churches based in Tasso: Tasso Baptist and Tasso United Methodist.

== Bibliography ==
- Hardy, Lucina Welch (March 1962). An Album of Historical Memories: Chatata - Tasso, Bradley County, Tennessee, 1830 -1961. Hardy & Randolph.
- Lillard, Roy G. (1980). Bradley County. Memphis State University Press. ISBN 0-87870-099-4 – via Internet Archive.
- Jameson, W.C. (1997). Lost and Buried Treasures of the Civil War. Lyons Press. ISBN 1493040758 – via Google Books.
