= East Cleveland =

East Cleveland is the name of the following places:

- In the United States of America:
  - East Cleveland, Ohio
  - East Cleveland, Tennessee
- In the United Kingdom:
  - Redcar and Cleveland
    - Middlesbrough South and East Cleveland parliament constituency
