= Prospect, Bradley County, Tennessee =

Coordinates: 35°10′37″N 84°55′06″W

Prospect is an unincorporated community located in Bradley County, Tennessee, and is part of the Cleveland metropolitan area. It is located about two miles west of the business district of Cleveland. It is bisected, but not directly accessible, by Interstate 75, and is served by State Route 312 (Harrison Pike). Prospect is predominantly residential and is served by Prospect Elementary School, part of Bradley County Schools. It was the home of the D'Addario sawmill that suffered a fire in 2014.
