= Waterville, Tennessee =

Unincorporated Tennessean community

Coordinates: 35°06′27″N 84°51′50″W

Waterville is an unincorporated community located in Bradley County, Tennessee. It is located about 3 miles southeast of the business district of Cleveland along State Route 60 (Dalton Pike), and is part of the Cleveland metropolitan area. It is located just west of Wildwood Lake.

Waterville Golf Course is a golf course located within the community. Waterville Elementary School, part of Bradley County Schools, serves students in the area.
