= Walker High School =

Walker High School may refer to the following schools in the United States:

- Walker High School (Jasper, Alabama)
- Walker High School (Atlanta), Georgia
- O. Perry Walker High School in New Orleans, Louisiana
- Walker High School (Walker, Louisiana), listed on the NRHP in Louisiana
- Warren-Walker High School, Henderson, Nevada
- Walker Valley High School, Bradley County, Tennessee
- Maggie L. Walker High School, Richmond, Virginia
