= Cleveland metropolitan area, Tennessee =

Cleveland Metropolitan Area Cleveland, TN Metropolitan Statistical Area
- Metropolitan Statistical Area
- Cleveland, Tennessee Metropolitan Statistical Area
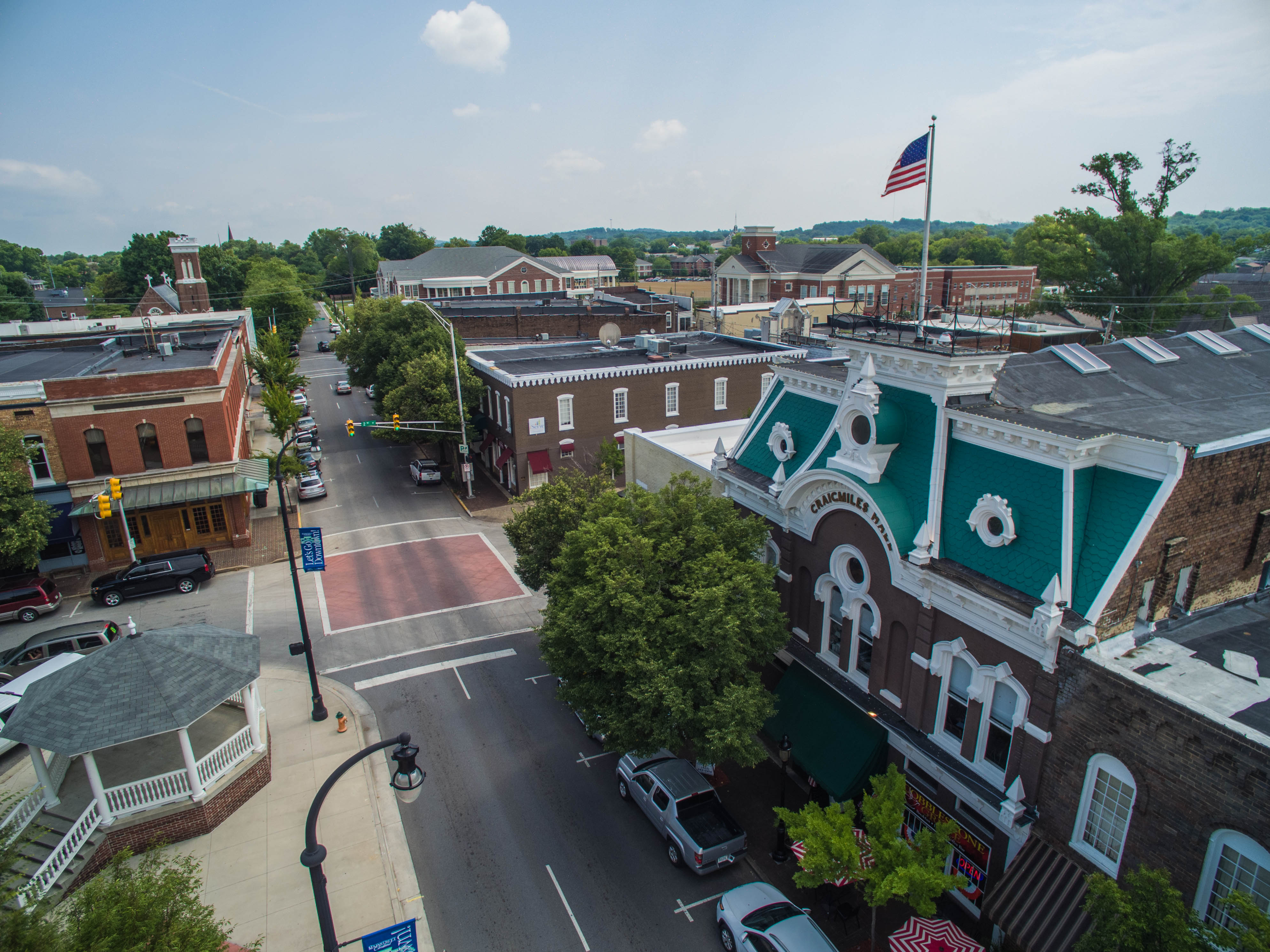
- Craigmiles Hall (on the right) in downtown Cleveland
Interactive Map of Cleveland, TN MSA
City of Cleveland
Cleveland, TN MSA
Other Counties in the Chattanooga CSA
- Country: United States
- State: Tennessee
- Largest city: Cleveland

Area
  - Total: 773 sq mi (2,000 km^{2})
- Highest elevation: 4,222 ft (1,287 m)
- Lowest elevation: 674 ft (205 m)

Population (2020)
  - Total: 126,164
  - Rank: 319th in the U.S.
  - Density: 163.21/sq mi (63.02/km^{2})
- Time zone: UTC−5 (EST)
  - Summer (DST): UTC−4 (EDT)

The Cleveland, Tennessee Metropolitan Statistical Area, as defined by the United States Census Bureau, is an area consisting of two counties in southeast Tennessee – Bradley and Polk – anchored by the city of Cleveland. As of the 2020 United States census, the MSA had a population of 126,164. The MSA is also part of the Chattanooga Combined Statistical Area. The MSA was first designated in June 2003. Geographically, this metropolitan area is mostly coexistant with the Ocoee Region, a historical and cultural name that reflects the heritage of the area.

== Counties ==
- Bradley
- Polk

== Communities ==
- Places with more than 40,000 inhabitants
  - Cleveland (Principal city)
- Places with 1,000 to 10,000 inhabitants
  - Benton
  - East Cleveland
  - Hopewell
  - South Cleveland
  - Wildwood Lake
- Places with fewer than 1,000 inhabitants
  - Charleston
  - Conasauga (CDP)
  - Copperhill
  - Ducktown
- Unincorporated places
  - Delano
  - Farner
  - Georgetown (partial)
  - Harbuck
  - Hopewell Estates
  - Misty Ridge
  - Ocoee
  - Old Fort
  - Parksville
  - Prospect
  - Reliance
  - Tasso
  - Turtletown
  - Waterville

== Demographics ==
As of the census of 2010, there were 115,788 people, 44,600 households, and 31,622 families residing in the metropolitan area. The racial makeup of the MSA was 92.89% White, 3.69% African American, 0.34% Native American, 0.76% Asian, 0.05% Pacific Islander, and 1.42% from two or more races.

As of the census of 2000, there were 104,015 people, 40,729 households, and 29,400 families residing within the MSA. The racial makeup of the MSA was 93.81% White, 3.40% African American, 0.28% Native American, 0.50% Asian, 0.02% Pacific Islander, 0.77% from other races, and 1.23% from two or more races. Hispanic or Latino of any race were 1.86% of the population.

The median income for a household in the MSA was $32,339, and the median income for a family was $39,075. Males had a median income of $29,179 versus $21,209 for females. The per capita income for the MSA was $17,067.

== Combined Statistical Area ==
The Chattanooga-Cleveland-Athens, TN-GA Combined Statistical Area is made up of six counties in southeast Tennessee and three counties in northwest Georgia. The statistical area includes the Cleveland Metropolitan Statistical Area, Chattanooga Metropolitan Statistical Area, and the Athens Micropolitan Statistical Area.

== Transportation ==
Interstate 75, U.S. Route 11, U.S. Route 64, U.S. Route 74, and S.R. 60 pass through Cleveland and Bradley County. U.S. 64 and 74 also serve Ocoee, Ducktown, and Copperhill. U.S. 11 also serves Charleston and McDonald. U.S. Route 411 runs north and south through Polk county and serves Benton and Ocoee. S.R. 68 runs through eastern Polk county and serves Copperhill and Ducktown.

=== Major roadways ===
- Interstate 75
- U.S. Route 11
- U.S. Route 64
- U.S. Route 74
- U.S. Route 11 Bypass
- U.S. Route 64 Bypass
- U.S. Route 411
- S.R. 30
- S.R. 40
- S.R. 60
- S.R. 68
- S.R. 74
- S.R. 123
- S.R. 163
- S.R. 306
- S.R. 308
- S.R. 312
- S.R. 313
- S.R. 314
- S.R. 315
- S.R. 317

== See also ==
- Tennessee census statistical areas
- List of cities and towns in Tennessee
