= Cleveland Daily Banner =

Newspaper in Cleveland, Tennessee

- Front page of the January 17, 2016 issue of the Cleveland Daily Banner.
- Type: Three day weekly
- Owner: Paxton Media Group
- Founder: Robert McNelley
- Publisher: Jana Thomasson
- Editor: Lindsay Pride
- Managing editor: Tim Siniard
- Founded: 1854
- Ceased publication: 1863
- Relaunched: 1865
- Political alignment: None
- Language: English
- Headquarters: 2075 N. Ocoee St. Suite B Cleveland, Tennessee 37311
- Website: clevelandbanner.com

The Cleveland Daily Banner is a two-day weekly newspaper published in Cleveland, Tennessee. Founded in 1854, it is the longest-running and currently only newspaper in Bradley County, and one of the oldest newspapers in the state.

The newspaper was founded as the Cleveland Banner, a Democratic newspaper by editor Robert McNelley (pronounced "McAnnelley"), and published its first edition on May 1, 1854. McNelley, who was a supporter of the Confederacy during the Civil War, was arrested by Federal troops in the fall of 1863, and the newspaper ceased publication. The newspaper returned on September 16, 1865, under McNelley's leadership.

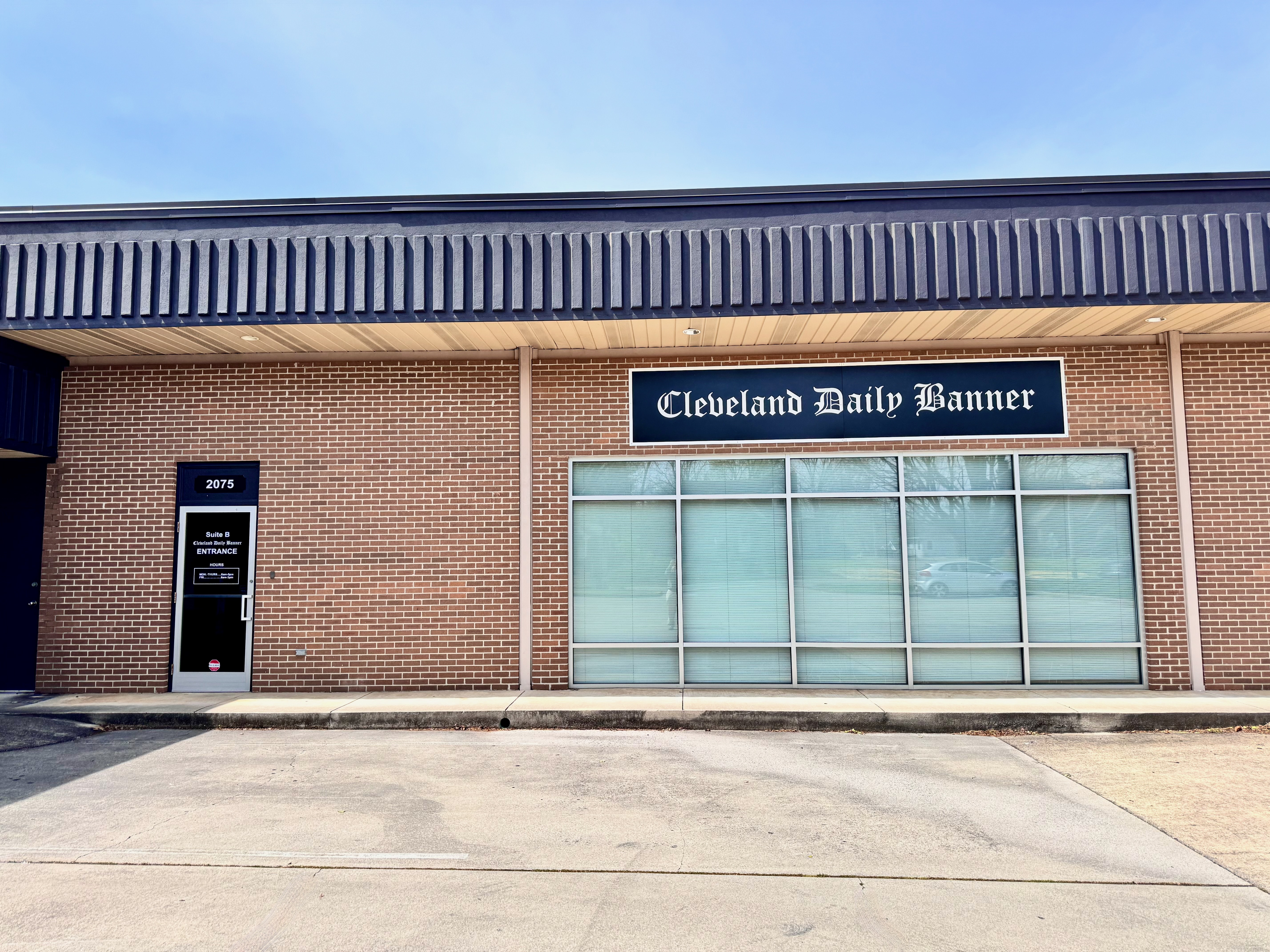
The Cleveland Daily Banner headquarters at 2075 N. Ocoee Street

By 1885 the paper had merged with The Polk County News and the Bradley News. The Banner building was destroyed by fire in 1906. Long headquartered downtown, the newspaper moved to new offices on 25th Street in January 1970. On February 13, 2023, the Banner offices moved once again to 2075 N. Ocoee Street following the sale of the Banner to Paxton Media Group. Printing of the Banner moved to a separate site in Sevierville, Tennessee.

The two former associate editors, Rick Norton and Gwen Swiger, were with the newspaper for a combined period of more than 50 years. The Gwen Swiger/Rick Norton Scholarship for Journalism and Communications, designed for students in Bradley County Schools and Cleveland City Schools, was announced on May 10, 2018, on a day designed in their honor by County Mayor D. Gary Davis and Cleveland Mayor Tom Rowland. The scholarship is being administered by the Community Foundation of Cleveland/Bradley County, and was established by Banner staff writer Brian Graves.

As of 2026, the paper is printed only on Wednesday and Saturday.

== Notable contributors ==
- Charles Paul Conn, former sports writer who became an author and president of Lee University
