= McDonald, Tennessee =

- Census-designated place
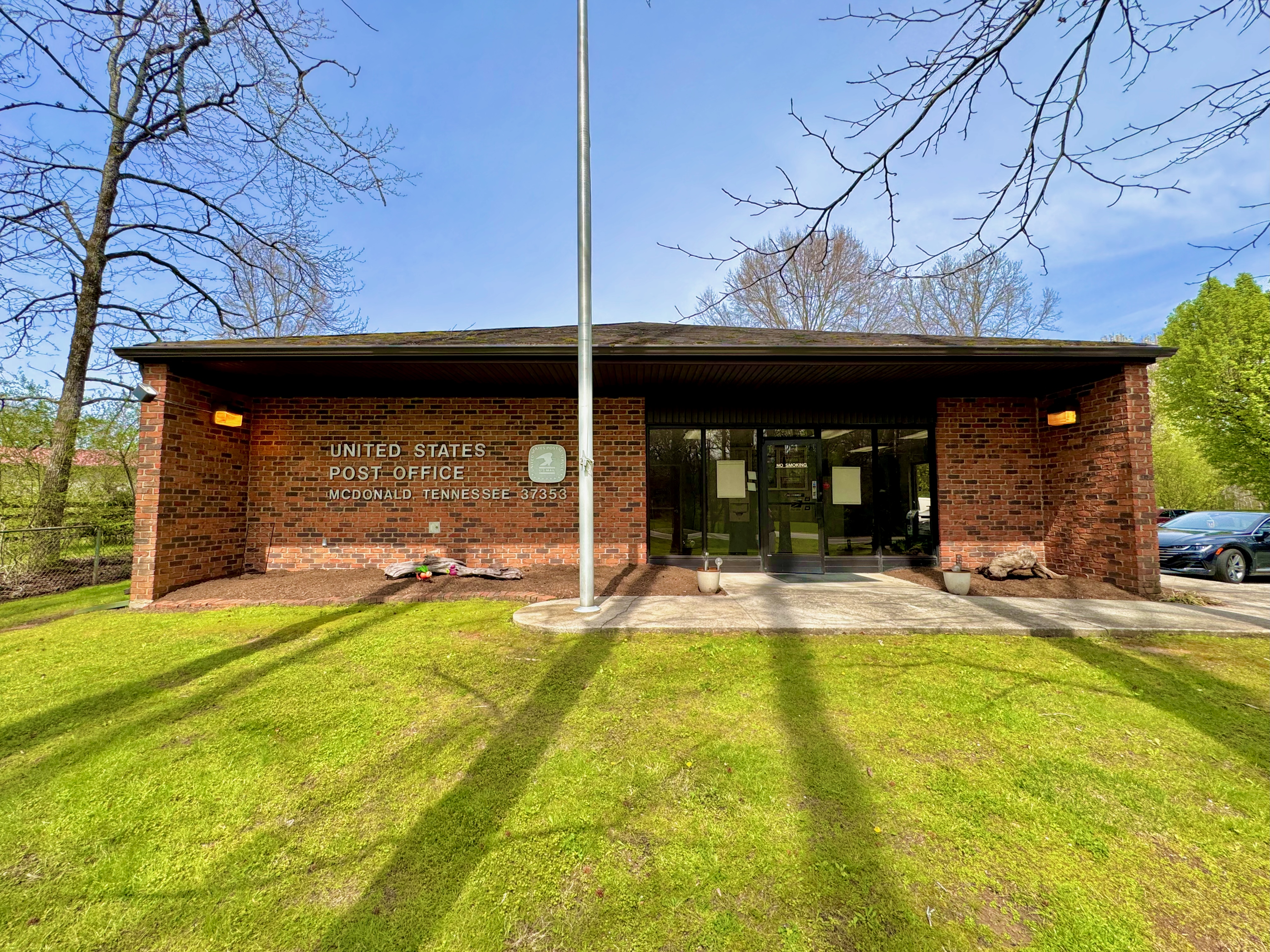
- The McDonald, Tennessee, post office

- Location within Tennessee Location within the United States
- Coordinates: 35°06′48″N 84°58′58″W
- Country: United States
- State: Tennessee
- County: Bradley County, Tennessee
- Elevation: 853 ft (260 m)

Population (2020)
  - Total: 586
- Time zone: UTC-5 (Eastern (EST))
  - Summer (DST): UTC-4 (EDT)
- ZIP code: 37353
- Area code: 423
- GNIS feature ID: 1293249

McDonald is an unincorporated community and census-designated place (CDP) in Bradley County, Tennessee, United States. McDonald is located along U.S. Route 11 and U.S. Route 64 6.8 miles (10.9 km) west-southwest of Cleveland. McDonald has a post office with ZIP code 37353.

The United States Census Bureau treated the community as a CDP for the 2020 census and the population was 586.

== History ==
The McDonald community was established circa 1850. The origin of its name is unclear; the community may have been named for a Scottish trader, a railroad builder, or the mother of a resident. In 1887, Goodspeed's History of Tennessee described McDonald's Station as a "small village on the East Tennessee, Virginia & Georgia Railroad." Many mineral springs are located in the McDonald area, and the community had many popular resorts from the 1880s to the 1930s.

== Horses ==
The Tri-State Exhibition Center, an arena for horse shows and other large events, is located in McDonald. The arena opened in 2001 and underwent a major expansion in 2003; the expansion was expected to be an economic boon for the area.

The Johnston family, of Coca-Cola Enterprises, has owned the 4,000-acre Bendabout Farm in McDonald since the 1830s. It has a polo ground maintained throughout the year. It is home to the Bendabout Polo Club, formerly known as the Chattanooga Polo Club, founded by Summerfield Johnston, Jr. in the 1950s. They hold the Bendabout Farm polo match once a year.

== School ==
Bachman Academy, a school for children with learning disabilities, was located in McDonald. The school opened in 1912 and served as a home for orphaned children until 1989. The school closed in 2017.
