= Blue Springs Encampments and Fortifications =

- U.S. National Register of Historic Places
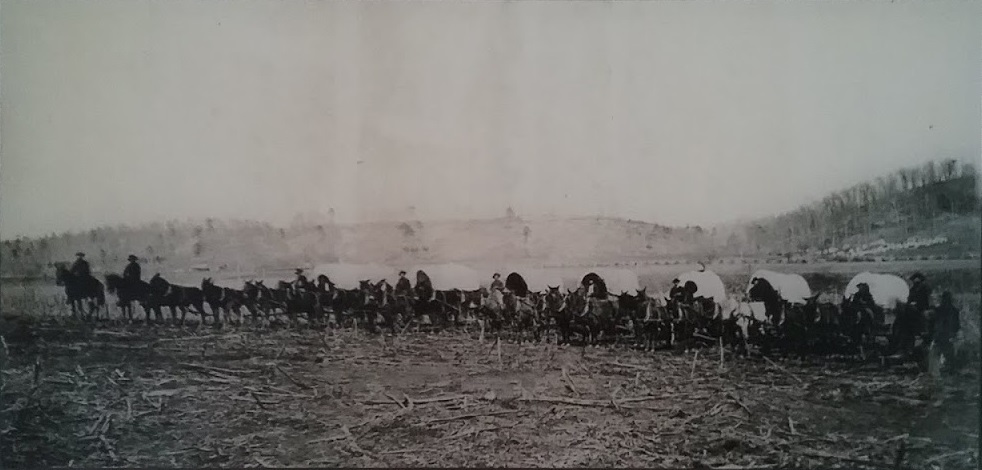
- IV Corps at Blue Springs in 1864.
- Location: Address Restricted, Cleveland, Tennessee
- Area: 682 acres (276 ha)
- Built: 1863
- MPS: Civil War Historic and Historic Archeological Resources in Tennessee MPS
- NRHP reference No.: 99000427
- Added to NRHP: April 16, 1999

Blue Springs Encampments and Fortifications is the site of a Civil War military encampment in Bradley County, Tennessee. Union Army forces commanded by General William Tecumseh Sherman camped at this location between October 1863 and April 1865. Entrenchments built on the crests of ridges overlooking the camps are still visible on the site. Stone reinforcements are present in some sections of the entrenchments.

The property, which is now forest and farmland, was listed on the National Register of Historic Places in 1999. A Civil War Trails Program marker was placed near the site in 2016.

In Bradley County, Union troops led by Sherman also camped near Tasso on multiple occasions in 1863.
