= Misty Ridge, Tennessee =

Unincorporated community in Tennessee, United States

Coordinates: 35°15′47″N 84°56′00″W

Misty Ridge is an unincorporated community in Bradley County, Tennessee. It is included in the Cleveland metropolitan statistical area.

The community is located in northwestern Bradley County a few miles south of Georgetown, Tennessee, partly on White Oak Mountain near the Hamilton County line. Originally a logging area, the community was improved and revitalized in the late 1970s by a local developer to allow for residences.
