= South Cleveland, Tennessee =

- CDP
- Location of South Cleveland, Tennessee
- Coordinates: 35°6′56″N 84°53′34″W
- Country: United States
- State: Tennessee
- County: Bradley

Area
  - Total: 14.07 sq mi (36.43 km^{2})
  - Land: 14.07 sq mi (36.43 km^{2})
  - Water: 0 sq mi (0.00 km^{2})
- Elevation: 929 ft (283 m)

Population (2020)
  - Total: 7,673
  - Density: 545.5/sq mi (210.62/km^{2})
- Time zone: UTC-5 (Eastern (EST))
  - Summer (DST): UTC-4 (EDT)
- FIPS code: 47-69740
- GNIS feature ID: 1303720

South Cleveland is a census-designated place (CDP) in Bradley County, Tennessee, United States. The population was 7,673 at the 2020 census. The community is located directly south of the city of Cleveland, Tennessee. It is included in the Cleveland Metropolitan Statistical Area.

== Geography ==
South Cleveland is located at 35°06′56″N 84°53′34″W.

According to the United States Census Bureau, the CDP has a total area of 14.3 square miles (37 km^{2}), all of it land.

The southern portion of the beltway bypass around Cleveland known as APD-40 (U.S. 64 Bypass) passes through the community. U.S. 11/64 (South Lee Highway) run along the western boundary, and State Route 60 (Dalton Pike) runs along the eastern. Several ridges run through the community, including (from west to east) Candies Creek Ridge, Lead Mine Ridge, and Blue Springs Ridge.

== Demographics ==
Historical population
Census	Pop.	Note	%±
2020	7,673		—
U.S. Decennial Census

=== 2020 census ===
South Cleveland racial composition
Race	Number	Percentage
White (non-Hispanic)	6,218	81.03%
Black or African American (non-Hispanic)	214	2.79%
Native American	20	0.26%
Asian	55	0.72%
Pacific Islander	8	0.1%
Other/Mixed	371	4.84%
Hispanic or Latino	787	10.26%

As of the 2020 United States census, there were 7,673 people, 3,066 households, and 2,178 families residing in the CDP.

=== 2000 census ===
As of the census of 2000, there were 6,216 people, 2,314 households, and 1,828 families residing in the CDP. The population density was 425.1 inhabitants per square mile (164.1/km^{2}). There were 2,473 housing units at an average density of 169.1 units per square mile (65.3 units/km^{2}). The racial makeup of the CDP was 94.88% White, 1.98% African American, 0.14% Native American, 0.27% Asian, 0.92% from other races, and 1.80% from two or more races. Hispanic or Latino of any race were 2.09% of the population.

There were 2,314 households, out of which 34.9% had children under the age of 18 living with them, 63.3% were married couples living together, 11.1% had a female householder with no husband present, and 21.0% were non-families. 17.7% of all households were made up of individuals, and 6.2% had someone living alone who was 65 years of age or older. The average household size was 2.68 and the average family size was 3.01.

In the CDP, the population was spread out, with 25.6% under the age of 18, 9.4% from 18 to 24, 30.9% from 25 to 44, 24.4% from 45 to 64, and 9.7% who were 65 years of age or older. The median age was 35 years. For every 100 females, there were 99.4 males. For every 100 females age 18 and over, there were 94.6 males.

The median income for a household in the CDP was $35,995, and the median income for a family was $39,983. Males had a median income of $28,181 versus $20,650 for females. The per capita income for the CDP was $15,370. About 8.2% of families and 10.0% of the population were below the poverty line, including 14.2% of those under age 18 and 8.1% of those age 65 or over.

== See also ==
- East Cleveland, Tennessee
- Wildwood Lake, Tennessee
