= D'Addario (manufacturer) =

American musical instrument accessories manufacturer

- Type: Private company
- Industry: Musical instruments
- Founded: 1973; 53 years ago
- Headquarters: Farmingdale, New York, United States
- Area served: Worldwide
- Key people: CEO: John D'Addario, III
- Products: Guitar strings & accessories, orchestral strings, woodwinds reeds & mouthpieces, drumheads, drumsticks
- Number of employees: 1,100+
- Subsidiaries: D'Addario; Evans Drumheads; ProMark Drumsticks; D'Addario Woodwinds; D'Addario Orchestral; D'Addario Foundation
- Website: daddario.com

D'Addario (da-DAIRY-oh) is a family-owned and operated American multinational company that specializes in musical instrument accessories. It was founded in 1973 by Jim and Janet D'Addario. It is headquartered in Farmingdale, New York.

D'Addario is the world’s largest musical instrument accessories manufacturer, marketing its products under several brands, including D'Addario Fretted, D'Addario Accessories, Evans Drumheads, ProMark Drumsticks, D'Addario Woodwinds, D’Addario Orchestral, and Puresound Snare Wire.

Today, the company conducts business on four continents including locations in Brooklyn, New York; Houston, Texas; Sun Valley, California; Newcastle upon Tyne, England; France, Germany, Australia and China.

== History ==
=== Early years ===
The Abruzzo region in Italy was an agricultural and sheep herding region in the 1600s, and many shepherds there produced strings made from sheep and hog intestines that were used on instruments such as guitars, violins, lutes, and harps. The D'Addario (phonetically pronounced /dəˈdɛɹio/ in American English or /dadˈdaɾio/ in Italian) family's connection to string making can be traced back to the 1600s.

The D’Addario family continued to make strings in Salle for two centuries before an earthquake destroyed the entire town in 1905. The D'Addario family eventually emigrated to Astoria in Queens, New York to continue the family business. In the company's earliest days, Charles D'Addario imported strings his father made from Salle. Later, he opened a shop out of his garage in Astoria where he began to produce and sell his own gut strings locally. He established C. D'Addario & Co. in the early years of The Great Depression. His son, John D'Addario Sr., grew up learning the trade from his father and ultimately became a partner of C. D'Addario & Son in the 1930s. The company then transitioned from producing gut strings to steel and nylon core strings. Nylon strings adapted a nylon microfilament created by chemical company DuPont to be used in toothbrushes and brooms. John Sr. realized this material would be perfect for nylon harp and classical guitar strings.

=== C. D'Addario & Son ===
In the 1940s and 1950s, C. D'Addario & Son continued to perfect its nylon strings. At this time, the company mainly was producing strings for violins; however, as the rock and roll community grew John D'Addario Sr. saw the opportunity to expand the company's product offerings. In the 1960s, John Sr. established Archaic Musical String Manufacturing Co., through which he produced the first electric guitar strings to have nickel-plated steel alloy. He supplied strings to instrument makers as original equipment and to private-label accounts. John Sr. then merged C. D'Addario & Son with Archaic Musical String Manufacturing Co. to form Darco Music Strings.

=== Darco Music ===
Darco Music Strings capitalized on the booming guitar market in the late 1950s and throughout the 1960s with a combination of innovative string technologies and partnerships with major guitar manufacturers. In 1959, Darco invented zinc-plated steel roundwound bass strings for electric bass guitars. In 1964, Darco offered bronze-wound acoustic and nickel-wrapped electric strings. In 1968, Darco Music Strings developed a strong relationship with the Martin Guitar Company and Darco eventually became a division of C. F. Martin & Company.

=== J. D’Addario & Company ===
In 1973, J. D'Addario and Company launched in Lynbrook, New York, where John Jr. and Jim D'Addario were the two partners of the company. Their father, John D'Addario, Sr., died in 2000.

=== Acquisitions ===
D'Addario has made several company acquisitions over the past four decades, including Kaplan Musical String Company in 1981, Evans Drumheads in 1995, Rico Reeds in 2004, Puresound Snarewire in 2007, ProMark Drumstick in 2011 and Super-Sensitive Musical String Company in 2020.

=== Present day ===
Effective January 1, 2020, D'Addario announced that John D’Addario III, son of John D'Addario Jr, and nephew of Jim D'Addario, would become the CEO & President of D'Addario, while Jim D'Addario, one of the company's founders and leaders since its inception in 1973, will be stepping down as CEO and assuming a new dual role as Chairman of the Board and Chief Innovation Officer.

=== COVID-19 face shields ===
In March 2020, after New York State required non-essential businesses to shut their doors due to the COVID-19 pandemic, the D'Addario Research & Development team worked alongside Chief Innovation Officer, Jim D'Addario to develop face shields with the mylar film used to produce Evans Drumheads' G2 heads.

In October 2020, D'Addario received a $341,000 grant from the New York State Government to expand face shield manufacturing operations.

== Brands ==
D’Addario markets products under a number of brand names, each of which is used on products geared toward a different niche.

- The D'Addario brand is used on many products, including guitar strings and straps.
- Evans Drumheads is a brand used for products geared toward drummers and is used for drumheads, including Level 360, introduced in 2013. It allows greater contact and balance between the head and drum with a larger tonal range.
- Pro-Mark is a line of drumsticks, including ActiveGrip, FireGrain and SPYR Mallets.
- D'Addario Woodwinds is a line of reed products, including Rico and Royal Reeds.
- D'Addario Orchestral is a line of orchestral string products, including Prelude, Ascenté synthetic violin strings, Helicore strings, Kaplan strings as well as Rosin and accessories.

== Products and innovations ==
=== Strings ===
The original 1950s string formula used pure nickel, which created a characteristically mellow sound. In the early 1960s, John D'Addario, Sr., introduced a brighter-sounding, second-generation nickel-plated steel string, which became the industry standard for the next five decades. Today, 80 percent of all electric guitar strings are based on his formula.

In 2014, D'Addario unveiled a new electric guitar string, NYXL, featuring a nickel-plated steel alloy designed to improve durability and tuning stability. The reformulated nickel-plated steel alloy boosts amplitude in the 1 kHz to 3.5 kHz range, modernizing overall tone without losing that nickel-plated steel feel.

In 2019, D’Addario introduced the X Series, a line of strings for electric, acoustic, classical, bass, and folk instruments. The D’Addario Research and Development team combined several of the company’s innovations, including extended lifespan treatments, New York Steel, and Fusion Twists, into a single product line. The series includes two variants, XT and XS, which differ in string construction and surface treatments to accommodate different player preferences and instrument types.

The first portfolio in the series, XT, combines high-carbon steel cores, and the most popular alloys with extended lifespan treatment on every string in the set, giving players enhanced break resistance, pitch stability, and long-lasting performance—all while preserving the tone and feel of uncoated strings.

In 2021, D'Addario launched XS Acoustic. Designed for six-string guitar, twelve-string guitar and mandolin, XS offers players maximum life, strength and stability—all without sacrificing tone. XS features a thin film coating (1/10 the thickness of a human hair) that completely protects the wound strings from corrosion, without dampening the tone.

In 2022, D’Addario introduced XS Electric strings, which included a reformulated nickel-plated steel wrap wire that provides a bright tone with increased output, bite, and sustain.

In 2025, D'Addario expanded its XS coated strings line with the introduction of XS Bass strings, marking the first time the XS series was made available for bass guitar. The strings incorporated the company’s ultra-thin film coating technology, previously used on acoustic and electric guitar strings, and were released in 4-, 5-, and 6-string configurations.

=== Accessories ===
In 1998, D'Addario acquired Planet Waves, a small guitar strap company on Long Island, and began manufacturing its own accessories under the Planet Waves brand name.

Some of the first products Jim D'Addario and the team designed included an Ergonomic Peg Winder with a built-in string stretcher, as well as a line of instrument cables.

Inventor Arthur Pantoja sent an email to Jim discussing the development of a combination peg winder and string cutter. Jim liked the idea, the patent was good, and the prototype worked, but the product needed some fine-tuning. With the help of guitar designer Ned Steinberger, they designed a marketable product called the Pro-Winder, with built-in hardened-steel wire cutters. The Pro-Winder, a combination peg winder and string cutter, was one of the first commercially available products to combine these functions.

D’Addario’s modern accessory line includes the XPND Pedalboards, a modular pedalboard system introduced in 2021 featuring a patented telescoping design that allows musicians to expand or reduce the size of the board to accommodate different effects pedal configurations. The XPND series also incorporates integrated cable management and adjustable layouts intended for live and studio use.

=== Drumheads ===
In 1956, drummer Marion "Chick" Evans produced the first commercially viable synthetic drumhead, which also proved to be weatherproof. He subsequently founded Evans Drumheads in 1957, running the company for a few years, making the heads by hand and personally selling them to professional drum shops along the West Coast of the United States. To help run production, Chick partnered with Bob Beals, who later became the company’s owner.

In March 1995, at Musikmesse Frankfurt, John D'Addario Jr. was introduced to Beals, who wanted to retire and was looking to sell the company. The D'Addario's saw this as an opportunity to enter a new market segment, and D'Addario acquired Evans Drumheads, moving the company’s factory from Dodge City, Kansas to Farmingdale, New York.

To improve quality, the new team developed and patented a Low Temperature Forming (LTF) system to bend and shape drumhead collars. One of D'Addario's most significant achievements was Jim D'Addario's idea for an overhead robotic gluing gantry to bond the drumhead film into the aluminum hoops.

In 2013, Evans Drumheads introduced Level 360, a new philosophy to each of its head ranges. A feature on all Evans drumheads, Level 360 technology aims to ensure greater contact and balance between the head and drum with a greater tonal range, allowing the playing surface of the head to sit perfectly level around the entire 360 degrees of the drum’s bearing edge. It also allows for ease of tuning and optimum quality of sound.

=== ProMark Drumsticks ===
Herb Brochstein, a seasoned drummer in the music industry, operated a studio and retail shop in Houston, Texas in the 1950s. A passing salesman sold him six pairs of Japanese-made drumsticks that were of much better quality than domestic sticks. Brochstein recruited Tat Kosaka in Japan to help him locate the factory in which they were made, and in 1957, he founded ProMark to begin selling drumsticks in the United States.

Initially, ProMark sticks were based on American-made models, which Brochstein sent to the factory with instructions on how he wanted them made. When Brochstein made his first visit to the factory, he was met with a startling revelation: that the factory was actually a house where two young guys used hand tools to shape each stick. The sticks made with hand tools were actually more consistent than the sticks being made in America in the late 1950s by the major drum companies. Ultimately, the hand-made quality is what led to the success of ProMark sticks.

ProMark was the first company to introduce Japanese Shira-Kashi white oak into the American market and the only company to successfully market oak sticks in the US.

D'Addario acquired ProMark in 2011, and in 2021, the company introduced the ProMark and ProMarkClassic brands.

ProMark includes the rear-weighted, performance-driven Rebound and Finesse lines, in addition to ActiveGrip and FireGrain.

Every ProMark stick undergoes a proprietary multi-stage weight and pitch sorting process called ProMatch, which assures consistency both from stick to stick and from pair to pair.

Kiln-dried wooden dowels are sorted, separated, and batched together based on the model. Using precise methods, raw dowels are cut, shaped, lacquered, and treated, yielding fully-formed sticks. Finished sticks are matched by weight, adhering to the strictest possible tolerances. All sticks are matched according to their tuned pitch, averaging a difference of only 9 Hz within any model.

ActiveGrip, which debuted in 2016, is a patented heat-activated grip coating. The black coating on the sticks gets tackier as the drummer's hands heat up and begin to sweat, essentially eliminating the need for conventional solutions.

ProMark's FireGrain sticks, which debuted in 2017, are inspired by the devastating fire in 2014 at D'Addario's previous sawmill in Prospect, Tennessee. While the blaze was a tragedy for the company in the short term, it led to the opening of a new 75,000-square-foot (7,000 m^{2}) sawmill in Elkton, Tennessee. It was also the spark that ignited the idea for ProMark's new line of drumsticks.

Some early findings pointed to other industries using flame-tempering techniques to harden baseball bats and hammer/axe handles, as well as arrowheads. One in-depth search turned out an ancient Japanese wood hardening and preservation method that originated in the 1700s: shō sugi ban ("burnt timber cladding"). This method is still popular in the construction industry. Its benefits include enhanced durability, UV ray protection, improved longevity and the repelling of insects.

ProMark's proprietary and patented flame-tempering technique was developed by D'Addario's in-house engineering team. Each drumstick is individually passed through a flame tunnel and receives an exterior char. In addition to creating a unique aesthetic, the open flames crystalize trace amounts of tree sap resin that remains in each stick, which builds an "exterior armor". This delays denting, chipping and fraying, which ultimately prolongs the life of the drumstick.

In 2020, ProMark released SPYR Mallets using a patented manufacturing system that ensures durability and consistency. All of the SPYR mallet heads are now injection molded in-house; the nail that had connected the shaft to the head has been replaced with an insert threaded inside the head.

=== Woodwinds ===
In 2004, Rico International and its parent company, The Rutland Group approached D'Addario to determine if the company had an interest in acquiring its woodwind instrument reed division.

Having been the North American Distributor for Vandoren since 1986, D'Addario invited the company to partner with them on a purchase, but Vandoren declined. D'Addario subsequently acquired Rico International in 2004.

The sale included Rico International's plantations in France and Argentina used to grow cane, which is then harvested, dried, sunned, processed into small sections, and ultimately machined into reeds.

With the acquisition, Jim D'Addario implemented sustainable plantation practices in the company's cane fields to develop digitally controlled diamond blades to make the final cut on the reeds.

=== Orchestral ===
In 1905, Ladislav Kaplan emigrated to the United States from Germany and opened a violin-making and repair shop in New York City. Kaplan soon moved the company to Connecticut, United States, where he began processing sheep gut for strings, eventually founding the Kaplan Musical String Company, makers of gut strings for harps and violin family instruments.

In 1981, D'Addario acquired the Kaplan Music String Company, and Jim D’Addario and his team retooled, retrofitted, automated and computerized the original Kaplamatic string winding machine designed by Otto Kaplan in 1949.

Jim and John D'Addario, Jr. were experts at manufacturing strings for fretted instruments, but making strings for bowed instruments required special expertise. They subsequently hired Norman Pickering, a prominent violist, luthier, and acoustic engineer, as a consultant to the bowed division.

Pickering and Jim began researching and developing multifilament twisted-steel core violin strings. D'Addario also began processing its own wires for bowed strings, introducing Prelude solid steel core strings in 1984.

The next challenge D'Addario had to overcome was to develop a way to manufacture commercially available twisted steel cables. Suppliers at the time couldn’t produce spring-tempered high-carbon steel cables on machines meant to manufacture stranded copper wires for electrical conduction. The D'Addario team developed their own machines to manufacture their own stranded-wire cables for violin and viola strings and following ten years of research and development, D'Addario introduced Helicore in 1994.

In 2017, D'Addario introduced Ascenté, a new synthetic core violin set. According to The Violin Channel, they are designed to provide a wider tonal range, a more sophisticated palette, increased pitch stability, and increased longevity and durability.

== Notable D'Addario string artists ==
- Billy Strings
- Yvette Young
- Chris Thile
- Brandi Carlile
- Kacey Musgraves
- Marty Schwartz
- Chris Stapleton
- Gary Clark Jr.
- Joe Satriani
- Kaki King
- Molly Tuttle
- John McLaughlin
- Mike Dawes
- Nile Rodgers
- Pat Metheny
- Vince Gill

== Corporate social responsibility ==
=== D'Addario Foundation ===
In 1979, Jim and John D'Addario, Jr. working in conjunction with Jim's wife Janet D'Addario, established the D'Addario Foundation. D'Addario had created professional-quality classical guitar strings, but the company wanted to reach out to new artists who were struggling to make a living. The Foundation's first iterations were born from a desire to connect with those artists and support the development of their careers. It was known as the Debuts and Premieres Series.

In 1981, the D'Addario Foundation for the Performing Arts established itself as a 501(c)(3) non-profit and expanded beyond New York City to support other programs in different cities. Janet D’Addario was Executive Director of the Foundation until 1992.

In 1993, The D'Addario Foundation shifted its focus beyond the performance series with a grant process for classical performance initiatives as well as not-for-profit music education, particularly focusing on expanding music education to the underprivileged.

In 2004, The D'Addario Foundation broadened its mission to support non-profit music education programs in high-poverty communities led by the passionate vision of John D'Addario, Jr.

In 2007, The D'Addario Foundation expanded its support of independent arts organizations, bringing immersive music construction and mentoring where it did not exist.

On its 30th anniversary in 2011, The D'Addario Foundation introduced the next generation of the D'Addario Performance Series at Carnegie Hall Weill Recital Hall.

In 2014, The James D'Addario Family Foundation in partnership with the D'Addario Foundation and the Harmony Program launched its own free El Sistema instrument instruction program for children on Long Island, New York. Participants in the program attend an elementary school that has not had a string program in over 30 years and where 75 percent of the student body is on free or reduced lunch.

In 2016, The D'Addario Foundation established a board that to launch a fundraising arm to amplify the need to support music education and build a donor base that supports the expansion of these efforts.

In 2018, The Girls in Music Initiative was launched with the goal of providing girls with advanced learning opportunities, scholarships, and transformative musical experiences that foster personal and professional growth. The D’Addario Foundation’s goal was to promote music created by women and to foster new opportunities that would allow more young women to thrive in the music industry.

In 2019, The D'Addario Foundation's College Scholarship Fund was announced. Each year, 10 students receive scholarships to help with the costs of college.

In 2022, D'Addario Foundation launched the Bridge Fund, focusing specifically on bridging the gap between access to extraordinary after-school and in-school music programs and the black community.

=== Playback ===
In 2016, D'Addario teamed up with TerraCycle, an international up-cycling and recycling company that re-purposes waste into new, materials and products, creating the Playback program. Playback is the world's leading string recycling program. Musical instrument strings are not recycled through municipal recycling programs and because of that, more than 1,500,000 pounds (680,000 kg) of instrument string metal ends up in landfills yearly. Playback’s goal is to facilitate 100 percent recycling and up-cycling of strings to minimize D'Addario's and the entire industry's impact.

=== Play. Plant. Preserve ===
D'Addario/ProMark conducted research in 2011 that showed the musical instrument industry used 1,500 trees daily to produce drumsticks. In 2013, ProMark began partnering with the Tennessee Department of Agriculture to replant all those trees. Today, ProMark is planting approximately 85,000 trees each year, totaling 600,000 trees in Tennessee soil to date. In 2021, D'Addario planted 100 percent of the trees used to manufacture ProMark drumsticks, and maintains a goal to plant one million trees by 2024, ultimately leading to a net-neutral industry in 2043.

== Controversy ==
In 2026, the company was accused of using artificial intelligence to produce a track featured on an advertisement for its new extended-range NYXL HD single strings. Initially denying the accusations, the company released a video purporting to show the workflow of the recorded demo, which was called into question after multiple content creators found that the track released on the video did not match up with the original advertisement. The company eventually admitted that the generative AI program Suno was used to regenerate an original recording and apologized, stating that "We do not support AI-generated music, and our process will reflect that going forward. We’ll require our employees and creative partners to disclose any use of generative AI, and we’ll more closely review everything we put into the world."
