= Walker Valley High School =

Public high school in Bradley County, Tennessee, United States

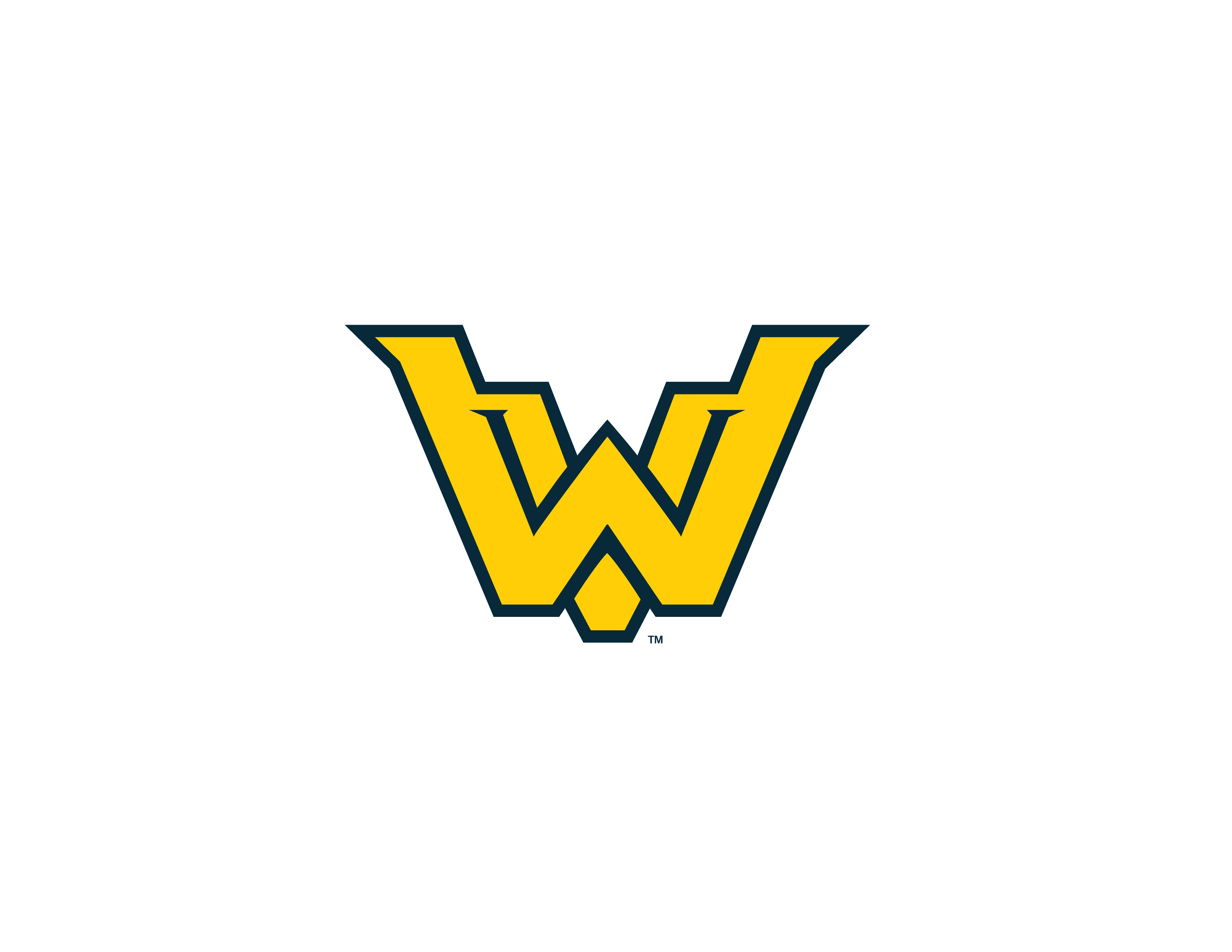

Location
- 750 Lauderdale Memorial Highway; Charleston, Tennessee 37310; United States; 35°16′34.68″N 84°47′5.28″W

Information
- Type: Public
- Motto: "One Valley"
- Established: 2001
- School district: Bradley County Schools
- Principal: Jeremy Jones
- Grades: 9–12
- Enrollment: 1,450 (2024–2025)
- Colors: Blue and Gold
- Athletics conference: Tennessee Secondary School Athletic Association (TSSAA)
- Mascot: Mustang
- Nickname: Dub-V
- Website: wvhs.bradleyschools.org

Walker Valley High School (WVHS) is a public high school in the Bradley County Schools system located in the northern part of Bradley County, Tennessee near Charleston. The school serves about 1,600 students in grades 9–12.

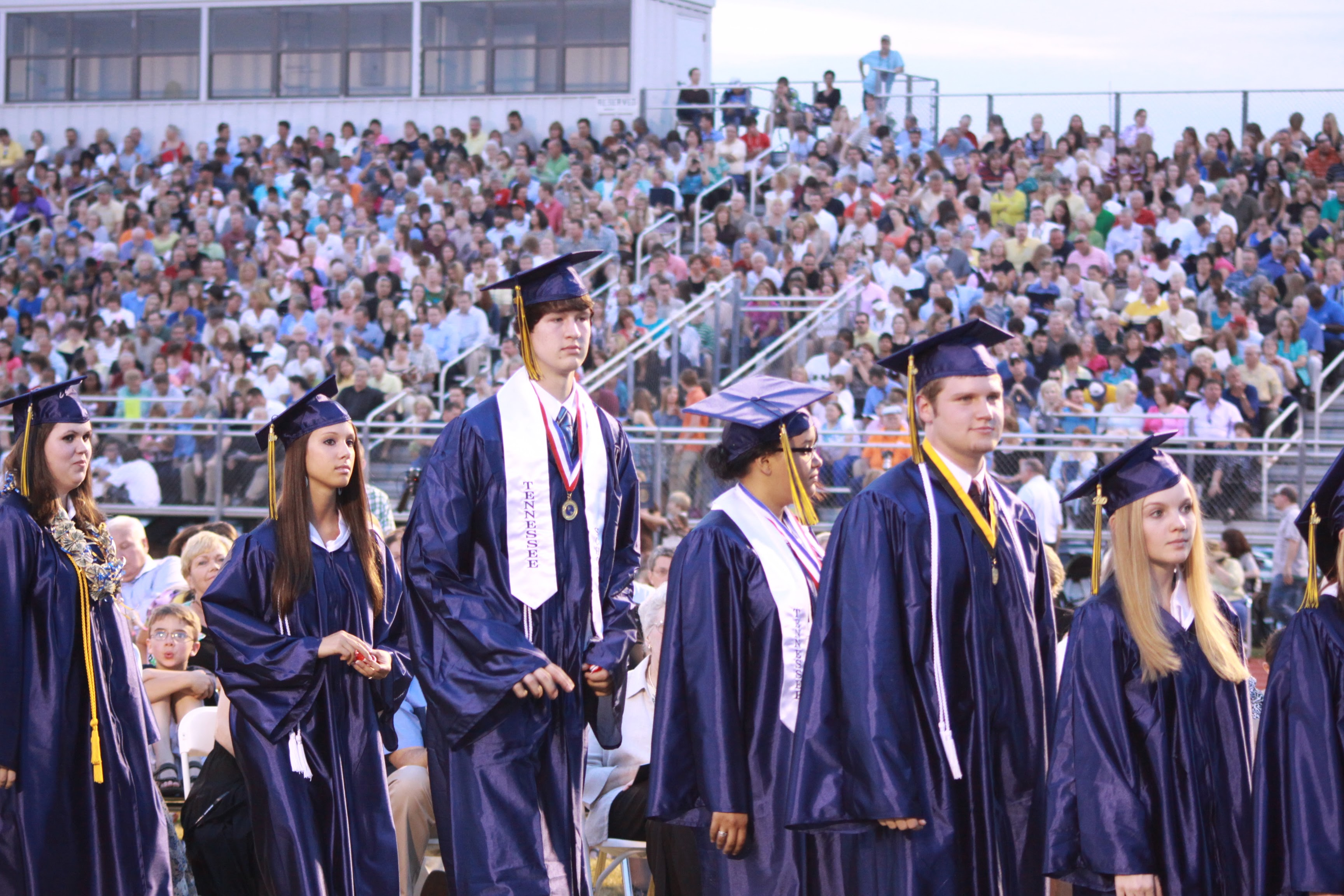
Graduation at Walker Valley High School.

The school's mascot is the mustang and its school colors are blue and gold. Walker Valley has been in existence since 2001, and maintains rivalries with Cleveland High School and Bradley Central High School. The principal is Jeremy Jones.

== History ==
Charleston High School was the first public high school in Bradley County. Located in Charleston, it opened its doors on September 18, 1913, and was expanded to include grades 1 through 8 in 1926. These later became known as Charleston Junior High School and Charleston Elementary School, and the entire school was called Charleston School. Due to increasing enrollment, deteriorating facilities, and the inability to expand the school, the need for a new school arose.

The land on State Route 308 was purchased in 1982 for the purpose of building a new school, however it took the Bradley County Commission 16 more years to secure funding to begin building. This was part of a master plan for the county schools that began in 1995 and continues to this day. The groundbreaking for the school occurred in May 1999, and construction began in June of that year, with a completion date set for June 2001. Community Tectonics of Knoxville, Tennessee was the architect for the project while the construction's management was under the oversight of H & M Construction from Jackson, Tennessee. Prior to construction of the project, committees from the schools in Bradley County and community members were formed to help with the design of the school. All teachers involved in secondary education had the opportunity to provide input into the design of the school.

After funding was secured, the process of naming the school began through a community panel. The panel narrowed the names down to three: Hiwassee River High School, River Valley High School and Walker Valley High School. They decided to go with the latter in honor of Chief Jack Walker, a leader of the Cherokee Nation who lived in the valley in the early 19th century, in addition to the fact that the name "reflects the heritage of the area". After Walker Valley opened, Charleston Junior High School was merged with Bradley Junior High School in Cleveland in 2001, and that same year, the name was changed to Ocoee Middle School. Charleston Elementary School still exists at the location.

== Athletics ==
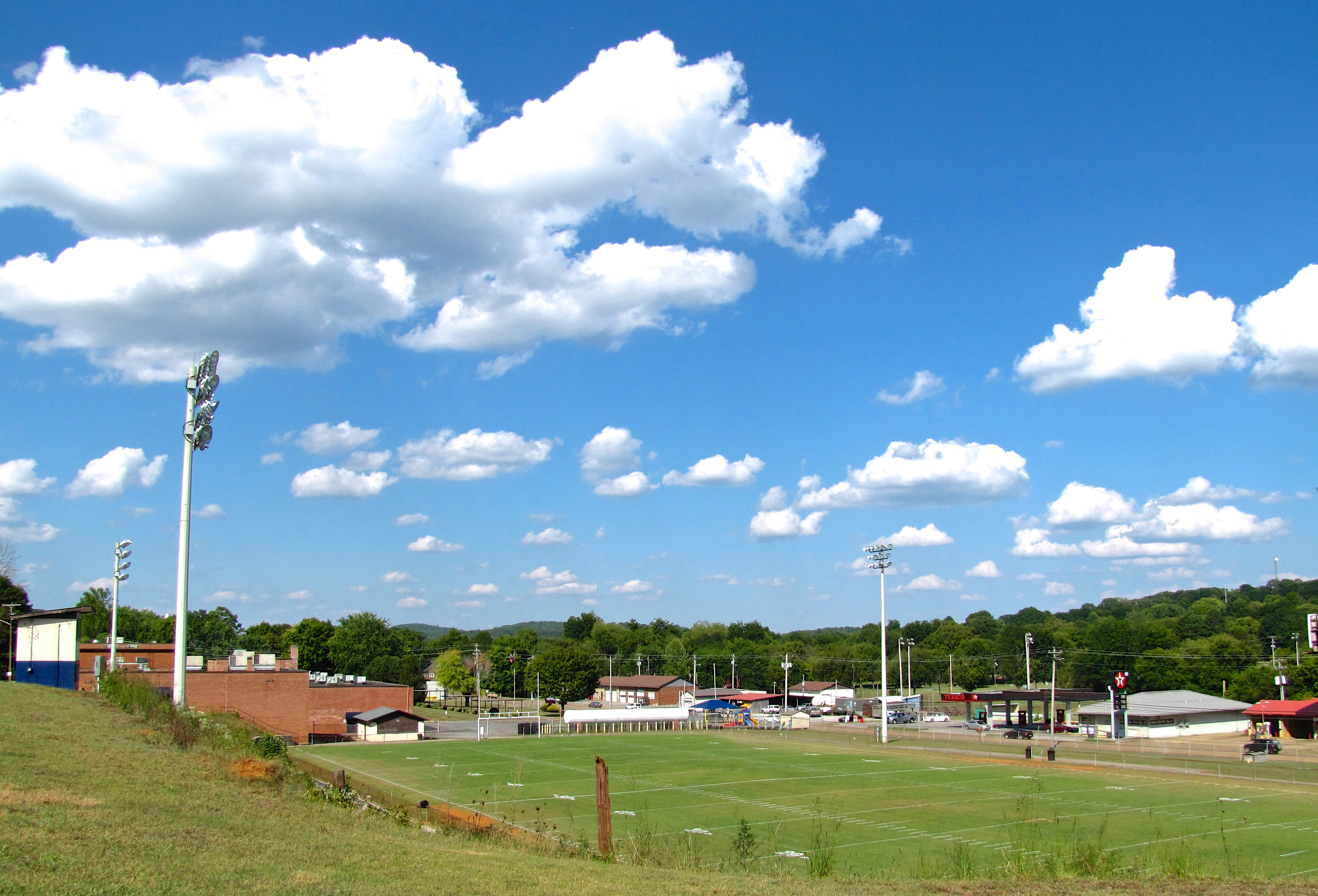
Football field of the former Charleston High School in Charleston.

Walker Valley competes in the Tennessee Secondary School Athletic Association (TSSAA). Its sports are:

- Baseball (State Tournament- 2012, 2023)
- Basketball (Boys State Tournament- 2009, 2016, 2025; Girls State Tournament- 2005, 2010)
- Bowling (Boys Runner Up 2014, 2021; Girls state champs 2005)
- Football (State Tournament- 2001, 2002, 2003, 2004, 2008, 2012, 2014, 2016, 2019, 2020, 2021, 2022, 2023, 2024)
- Girls' Flag Football (State Tournament- 2025)
- Golf
- Softball (State Tournaments- 2004 (Final 4), 2005 (Runner-Up), 2018 (Runner-Up), 2025 (State Champions)
- Soccer (State Tournament- 2024)
- Tennis
- Track and Field (Boys state champs 2011, 2021 Girls state champs 2005)
- Cross Country
- Wrestling (State champs 2013, 2016)

== Demographics ==
During the 2024–25 school year, Walker Valley High School enrolled 1,450 students, 49% of whom were male and 51% of whom were female. The racial and ethnic makeup of the student body was 84.3% Non-Hispanic White, 7.7% Hispanic (of any race), 2.6% Black, 1% Asian, 4.2% Multiracial, and 0.2% Native American.
