= Cleveland High School (Tennessee) =

High school in Tennessee, United States

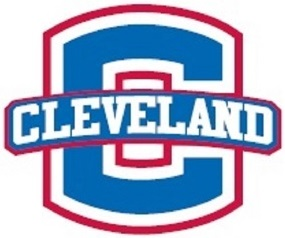

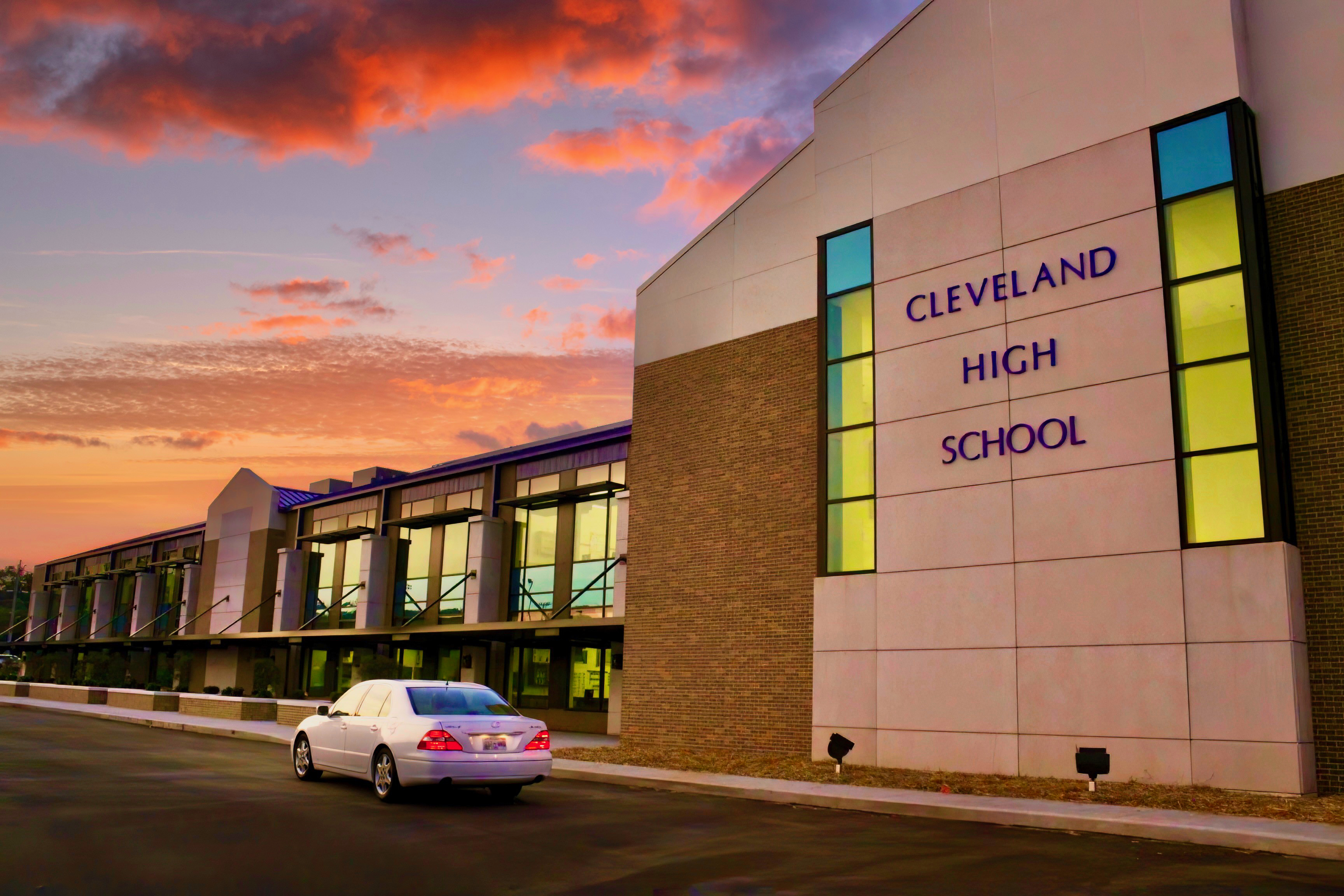
- Cleveland High School in Cleveland, Tennessee, pictured August 2, 2011

Location
- 850 Raider Drive NW; Cleveland, Tennessee 37312; United States; 35°11′40″N 84°52′8″W

Information
- Type: Public
- Established: 1966
- School district: Cleveland City Schools
- Principal: Bob Pritchard
- Staff: 110.50 (on an FTE basis)
- Grades: 9 to 12
- Enrollment: 1,799 (2023-2024)
- Student to teacher ratio: 16.28
- Colors: Blue, White, and Red
- Athletics conference: TSSAA District 3
- Nickname: Blue Raiders
- Website: chsraiders.com

Cleveland High School (CHS) is a public high school in the Cleveland City Schools system located in Cleveland, Tennessee. The school was founded in 1967 and serves 1,662 students in grades 9 to 12. The school's mascot is the Blue Raider, and its school colors are blue, white, and red. The principal is Bob Pritchard. The school maintains a rivalry with the crosstown Bradley Central High School, as with their other crosstown rival Walker Valley High School.

== History ==
Cleveland High School is located on the site of the home of Jesse Bushyhead (1804-1844), a Cherokee religious and political leader.

In the late 1950s, a group of Cleveland citizens began working for a city high school. The first step was taken when a ninth grade was added to Arnold Junior High, now an elementary school. On May 12, 1965, voters passed a referendum that allowed for the issuing of $2 million in bonds for construction of the new high school. The new school was completed in 1966, and in September of that year a historic walk took place from Arnold to the new high school to start the first year of school at CHS. Every year during homecoming week, a parade is held on Raider Drive to commemorate the anniversary of this historic walk. Former principals include James Traylor, Jim Sharp, T.C. Henley, Charles Carrick, Maxine Hughes, Doug Greene, Ken Willey, and Chuck Rockholt.

In 1971 Cleveland Junior High, which later became Cleveland Middle School, opened in a building adjacent to the high school at a cost of $2.1 million. A new building was added on to the school to add extra career prep courses in 1980. A renovation of the football field area took place in 1987. A new metal structure for the home stands was constructed on the opposite side of the field and a field house was built.

The Jones Wrestling Center was built in 2001 after Check Into Cash founder and class of 1972 alumni Allan Jones donated $1.5 million for its construction. Jones wrestled while at CHS. Also that year Cleveland Middle School moved to a new location, and the middle school building was adjoined to the original high school building, becoming the west wing of the high school and adding a "commons area" in between the two buildings in an $8.7 million project.

A new $8 million science wing was built in 2011. The wing is named the Max R. Carroll Science Wing in honor of a member of the Cleveland Board of Education who donated money for the project. The state provided funding for the expansion as well. This project had been proposed since 2005.

In December 2013, the Raider Dome, which was used as the school's main gymnasium was closed due to faults in the structure. The dome had always had structural problems since it was built in 1966. In May 2014, the school board voted to award a $319 thousand contract to demolish the dome. The dome was demolished the following month. A new $11 million gymnasium, dubbed the "Raider Arena," opened in April 2016.

In 2017 the school installed artificial turf on the football field.

== Academics ==
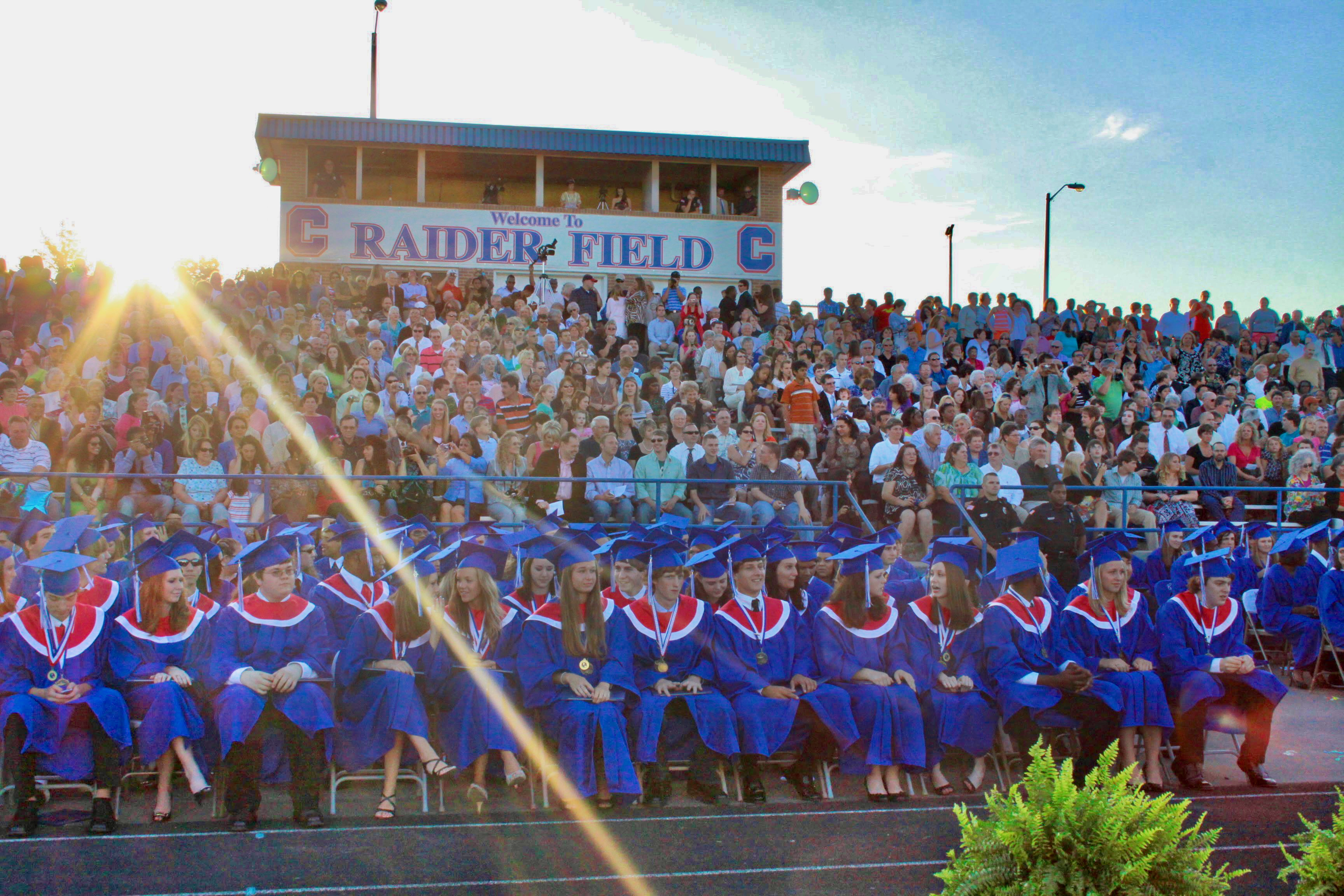
Graduation at Raider Field at Cleveland High School

- Cleveland offers 11 advanced placement (AP) courses and 5 dual enrollment courses.
- Cleveland also offers Early Admissions courses, which can be taken at Cleveland State or Lee University.
- Cleveland offers three foreign languages: Spanish, German, and French. English as a second language is also offered to non-native English speakers.
- Cleveland offers career and technical education for a variety of fields, including digital media, engineering, healthcare, business/marketing, criminal justice, automotive, culinary arts, and cosmetology.

The school has expanded its AP program over the last five years, adding new classes and preparing students for the exams, with a goal of increasing the number of students scoring 4s and 5s. As a result, the class of 2016 had the school's first AP Scholars since 2003, and the first AP Scholars with Honor and AP Scholars with Distinction in the school's history. In 2016, CHS was named to the 7th annual AP Honor Roll.

== CHS Live ==
CHS Live or CHSLive is the school's digital media/broadcasting program, begun in the late 2000s. Students in this program record and broadcast major events and a daily news show for students at the school through the National Federation of State High School Associations (NFHS) network. The program was awarded the NFHS Network's Best Overall School Broadcast Program at the NFHS convention in 2015, and the "Best Daily Newscast in the Nation" by the Student Television Network (STN) in 2016 and 2017, breaking an eight-year streak of Carlsbad High School in California.

== Athletics ==
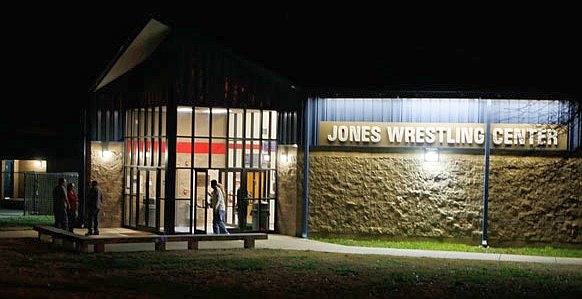
Jones Wrestling Center

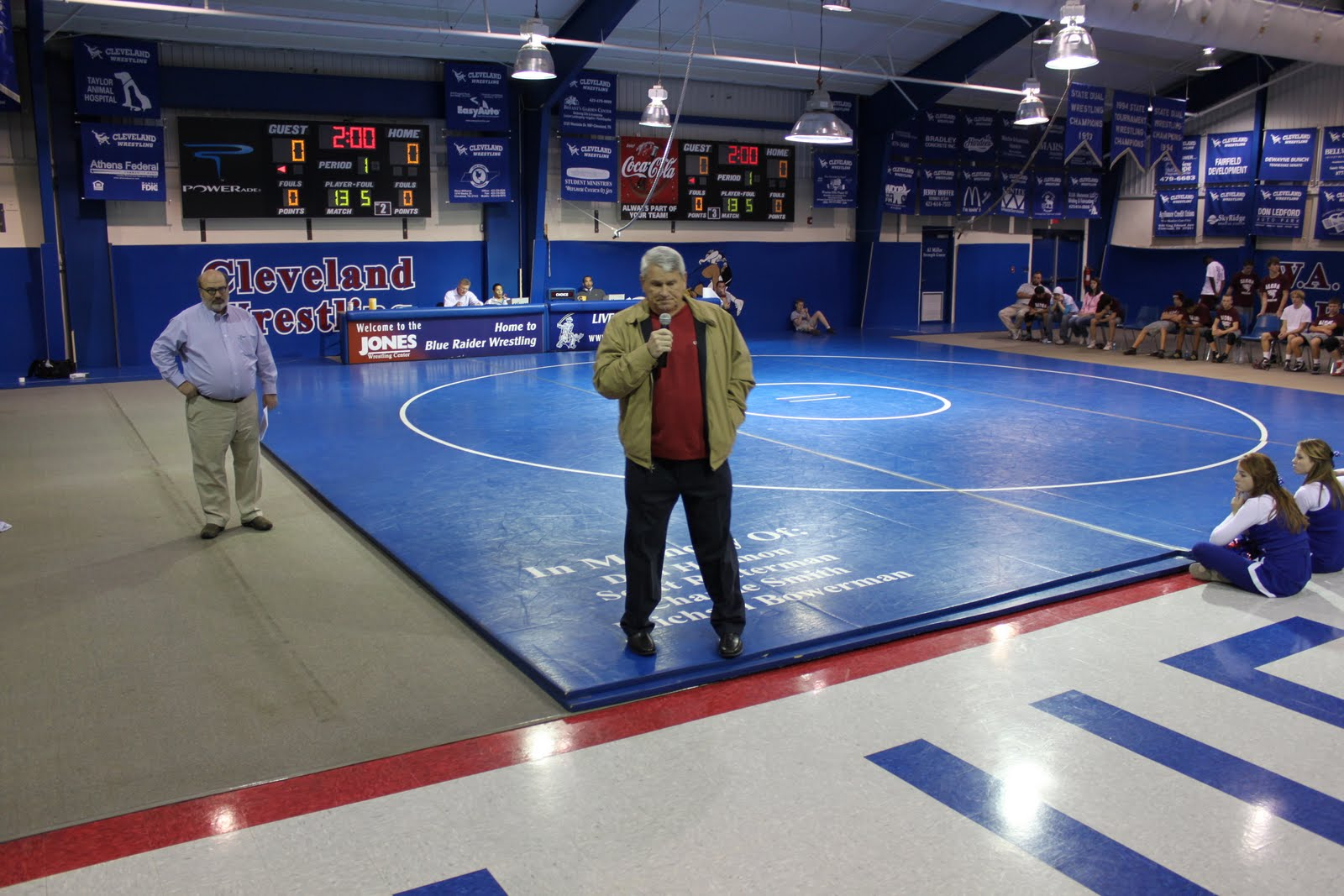
Inside the Jones Wrestling Center. Allan Jones, the center's namesake is at far left.

Cleveland's teams are known as the Blue Raiders. The school's main rival is Bradley Central High School, as well as Walker Valley High School. Cleveland competes in the Tennessee Secondary School Athletic Association (TSSAA) and its varsity sports are:

- Baseball
- Basketball
  - Boys state champs - 1997
  - 2020 - #1 ranked team in the state, 33-1, season canceled due to COVID-19
- Cheerleading
- Cross Country
  - State champs - 1994
- Football
  - State champs - 1968, 1993, 1994, 1995
  - Second longest winning streak in state - 54 straight games from Sept. 1993 to Nov. 1996.
- Golf
- Softball
- Soccer
- Swimming
- Tennis
  - Girls state champs - 1999
- Track and Field
  - Boys state champs - 1970, 1971, 1976, 1977, 1982, 1992, 1994, 1995, 2017
  - Boys team champs - 1977, 1992
  - Girls state champs - 2011
- Volleyball
  - State champs - 2016, 2017, 2022, 2023
- Wrestling
  - Individual State champs- 1968, 1976, 1980, 1981, 1982, 1983, 1986, 1987, 1988, 1993, 1994, 1995, 2001, 2003, 2005, 2007, 2010, 2011, 2012, 2013, 2014, 2015, 2017, 2018, 2019, 2020, 2021, 2022, 2023, 2024, 2025, 2026
  - Team Traditional State champs- 1980, 1994, 2011, 2013, 2014, 2015, 2018, 2019, 2020, 2021, 2022, 2023, 2024, 2025, 2026
  - Team Dual State champs - 1992, 1993, 1994, 2013, 2014, 2015, 2018, 2019, 2020, 2021, 2022, 2023, 2024, 2025, 2026

== Demographics ==
As of the 2016-17 school year, 64.22% of students were non-Hispanic white, 16.28% Hispanic or Latino (of all races), 14.82% Black or African American, 2.85% Asian, 1.14% from two or more races, 0.44% Native Hawaiian or Pacific Islander, and 0.25% Native American or Alaska Native. 54.08% of students were male and 45.92% were female.

== Notable alumni ==
- Travis Beacham (1999), screenwriter
- Brian Green (1980), stage actor
- Allan Jones (1972), businessman
- Alan J. Lacy (1971), businessman
- Darnell Mee (1989), NBA player
- Chad Voytik (2012), quarterback for the Pittsburgh Panthers
- Vincent Yarbrough (1998), NBA player
