= East Cleveland, Tennessee =

- CDP
- Location of East Cleveland, Tennessee
- Coordinates: 35°9′14″N 84°51′25″W
- Country: United States
- State: Tennessee
- County: Bradley

Area
  - Total: 1.26 sq mi (3.26 km^{2})
  - Land: 1.26 sq mi (3.26 km^{2})
  - Water: 0 sq mi (0.00 km^{2})
- Elevation: 965 ft (294 m)

Population (2020)
  - Total: 1,725
  - Density: 1,368.5/sq mi (528.39/km^{2})
- Time zone: UTC-5 (Eastern (EST))
  - Summer (DST): UTC-4 (EDT)
- FIPS code: 47-22500
- GNIS feature ID: 1283324

East Cleveland is a census-designated place (CDP) and community in Bradley County, Tennessee, United States. As indicated by its name, it is located directly east of the city limits of Cleveland, and is also considered one of the major divisions of the city. The population was 1,725 at the 2020 census. It is included in the Cleveland Metropolitan Statistical Area.

== Geography ==
East Cleveland is located at 35°9′14″N 84°51′25″W (35.154009, -84.856866).

According to the United States Census Bureau, the CDP has a total area of 1.3 square miles (3.4 km^{2}), all land.

U.S. Route 64 and APD-40 (U.S. 64 Bypass and a portion of State Route 60) intersect in the community. State Route 74 begins in the southern portion. The CDP is traversed by a ridge known in the south as Blue Springs Ridge.

== Demographics ==
Historical population
Census	Pop.	Note	%±
2020	1,725		—
U.S. Decennial Census

=== 2020 census ===
East Cleveland racial composition
Race	Number	Percentage
White (non-Hispanic)	1,269	73.57%
Black or African American (non-Hispanic)	115	6.67%
Native American	11	0.64%
Asian	3	0.17%
Other/Mixed	121	7.01%
Hispanic or Latino	206	11.94%

As of the 2020 United States census, there were 1,725 people, 672 households, and 548 families residing in the CDP.

=== 2000 census ===
As of the census of 2000, there were 1,729 people, 692 households, and 471 families residing in the CDP. The population density was 1,360.4 inhabitants per square mile (525.3/km^{2}). There were 769 housing units at an average density of 605.0 per square mile (233.6/km^{2}). The racial makeup of the CDP was 92.08% White, 5.26% African American, 0.46% Native American, 0.06% Asian, 0.06% Pacific Islander, 0.69% from other races, and 1.39% from two or more races. Hispanic or Latino of any race were 1.27% of the population.

There were 692 households, out of which 31.4% had children under the age of 18 living with them, 43.9% were married couples living together, 16.8% had a female householder with no husband present, and 31.8% were non-families. 24.9% of all households were made up of individuals, and 9.4% had someone living alone who was 65 years of age or older. The average household size was 2.50 and the average family size was 2.93.

In the CDP, the population was spread out, with 25.4% under the age of 18, 9.8% from 18 to 24, 30.0% from 25 to 44, 23.2% from 45 to 64, and 11.6% who were 65 years of age or older. The median age was 35 years. For every 100 females, there were 102.7 males. For every 100 females age 18 and over, there were 99.4 males.

The median income for a household in the CDP was $22,610, and the median income for a family was $23,893. Males had a median income of $24,125 versus $17,740 for females. The per capita income for the CDP was $10,649. About 24.2% of families and 26.4% of the population were below the poverty line, including 34.4% of those under age 18 and 10.2% of those age 65 or over.

== See also ==
- South Cleveland, Tennessee
- Wildwood Lake, Tennessee
