= Farner, Tennessee =

- Unincorporated community
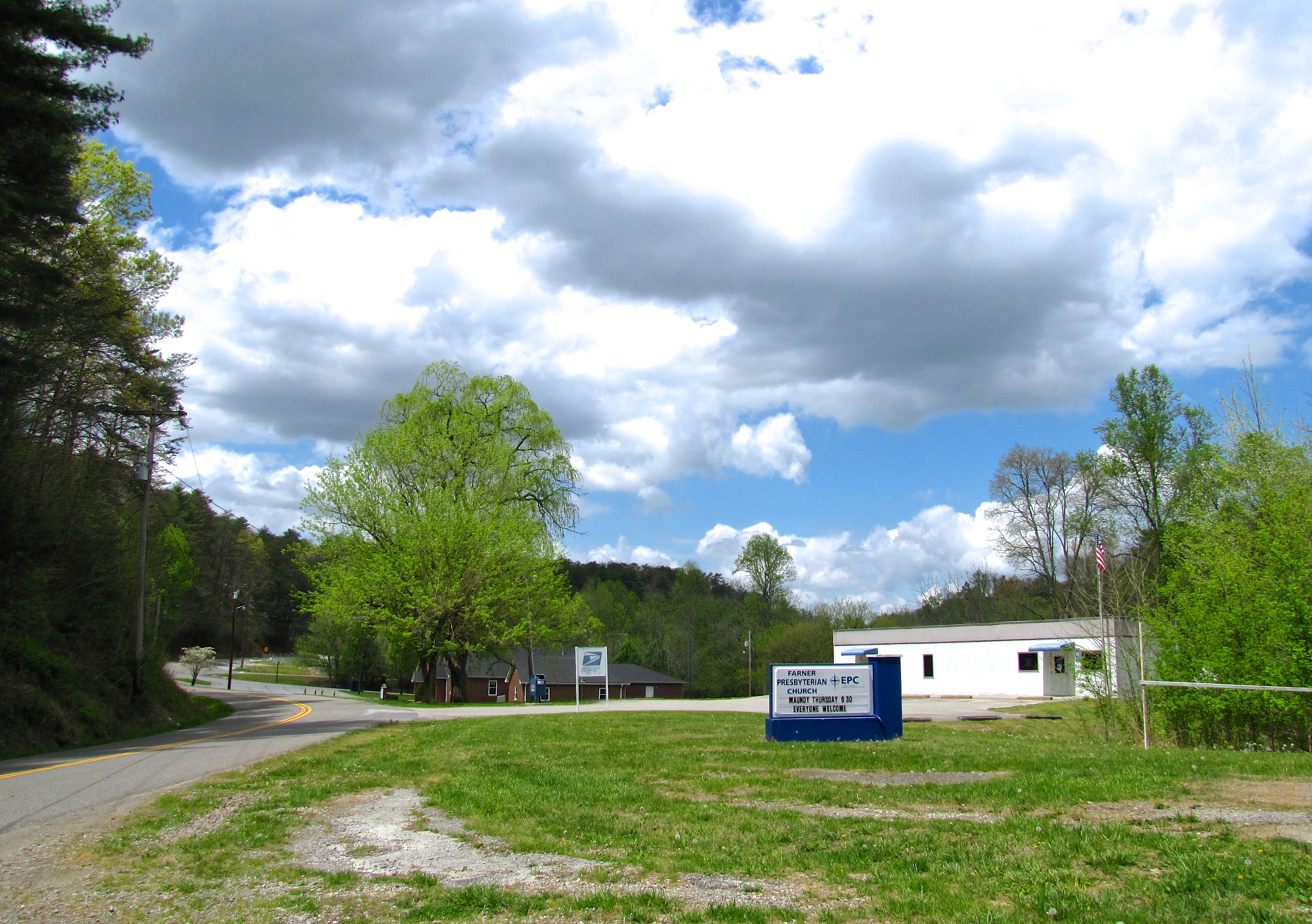
- Farner

- Location within Tennessee Location within the United States
- Coordinates: 35°09′15″N 84°18′55″W
- Country: United States
- State: Tennessee
- County: Polk

Area
  - Total: 1.46 sq mi (3.78 km^{2})
  - Land: 1.46 sq mi (3.78 km^{2})
  - Water: 0 sq mi (0.00 km^{2})
- Elevation: 1,598 ft (487 m)

Population (2020)
  - Total: 267
  - Density: 182.9/sq mi (70.61/km^{2})
- Time zone: UTC-5 (Eastern (EST))
  - Summer (DST): UTC-4 (EDT)
- ZIP code: 37333
- Area code: 423
- GNIS feature ID: 1328174

Farner is an unincorporated community in Polk County, Tennessee, United States. Farner is located in a mountainous area along Tennessee State Route 68 near the North Carolina border, 9 miles (14 km) north-northeast of Ducktown. Farner has a post office with ZIP code 37333. The Hiwassee River and Apalachia Dam are located just to the north.

== Demographics ==
Historical population
| Census | Pop. | Note | %± |
|---|---|---|---|
| 2020 | 267 | | — |
U.S. Decennial Census
