= Cleveland City Schools =

School district in Cleveland, Tennessee, United States

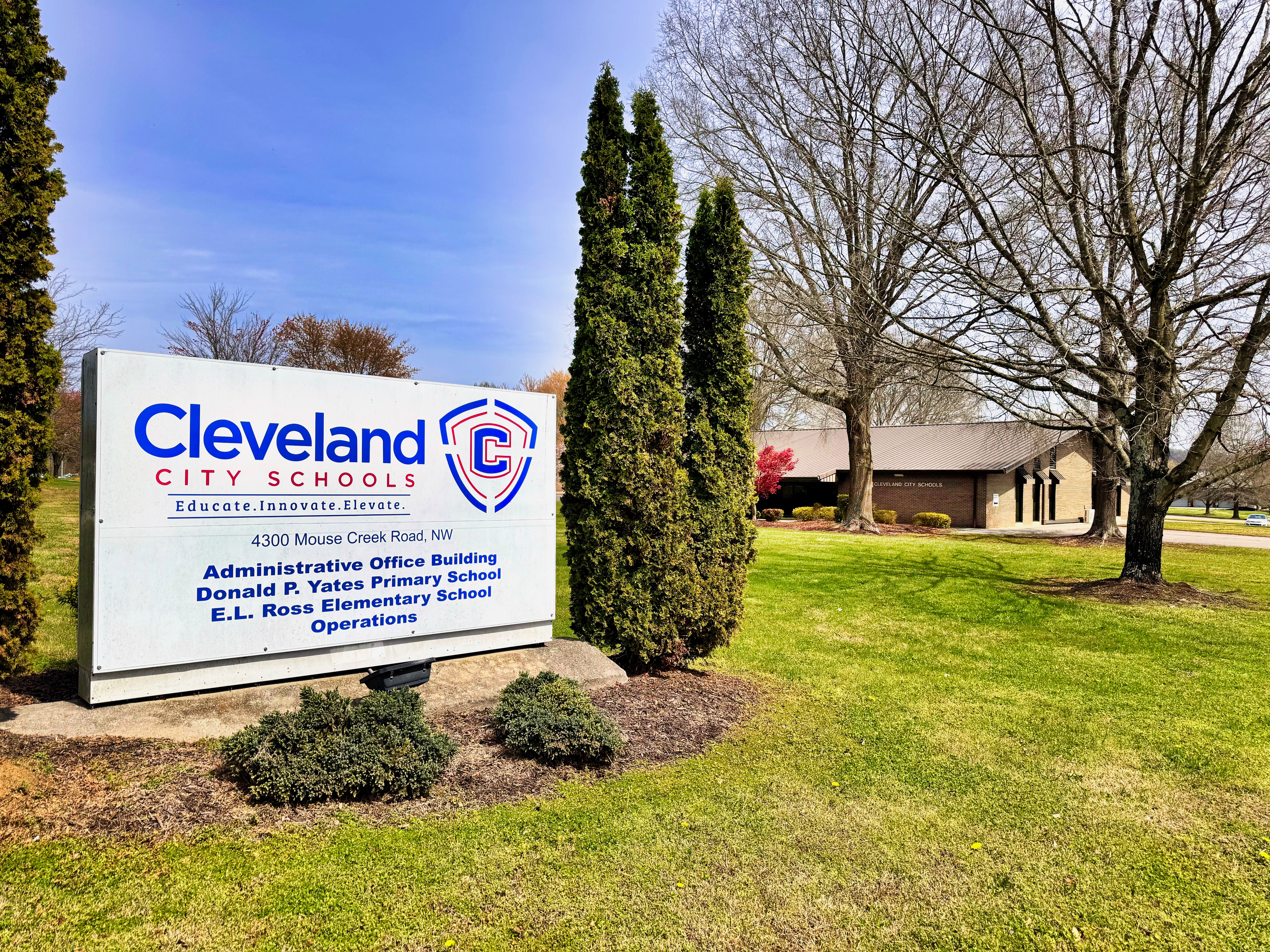

Location
- 4300 Mouse Creek Rd NW; Cleveland, Tennessee 37312 United States
- Coordinates: 35.2088°N 84.8581°W

District information
- Type: Public
- Motto: Every Child, Every Day
- Grades: PK-12
- Established: 1885
- Superintendent: Russell Dyer
- Schools: 10
- Budget: $52,041,000
- NCES District ID: 4700690

Students and staff
- Students: 5,792 (2017-18)
- Teachers: 356.5
- Student–teacher ratio: 16.25
- Athletic conference: TSSAA

Other information
- Website: www.clevelandschools.org

Cleveland City Schools is a school system based in Cleveland, Tennessee. The system operates ten schools and enrolls over 5,500 students.

== Schools ==
=== High schools ===
- Cleveland High School - primary high school
- Denning Center for Technology and Careers (formerly Teen Learning Center) - alternative high school

=== Middle school ===
- Cleveland Middle School

=== Elementary schools ===
- Arnold Memorial Elementary School
- Ernest L. Ross Elementary School
- Donald P. Yates Primary School
- Blythe Bower Elementary School
- Mayfield Elementary School
- George R. Stuart Elementary School
- Candy's Creek Cherokee Elementary School

== History ==
The district was founded in 1885 by D.C. Arnold, who was hailed as the "father of the graded school system of Cleveland." Cleveland High School opened its doors in September 1966. The Teen Learning Center was founded as an alternative high school in 1994. It was renamed the F.I. Denning Center of Technology and Careers in 2015 in honor of Dr. Frederick I. "Rick" Denning, who was the director of schools when it was founded.

In early 2024, the Cleveland Board of Education voted to oppose efforts to merge its system with Bradley County Schools. The move came after the county mayor suggested consolidating the districts to save taxpayers money.

== See also ==
- Cleveland, Tennessee#Education
