= Bradley County Schools =

School district in Tennessee

Location
- 800 South Lee Highway; Cleveland, Tennessee East Tennessee United States

District information
- Motto: Growing Students, Building Futures
- Grades: K-12
- Superintendent: Dr. Linda Cash
- Schools: 19

Students and staff
- Students: 10,490
- Athletic conference: TSSAA

Other information
- Website: www.bradleyschools.org

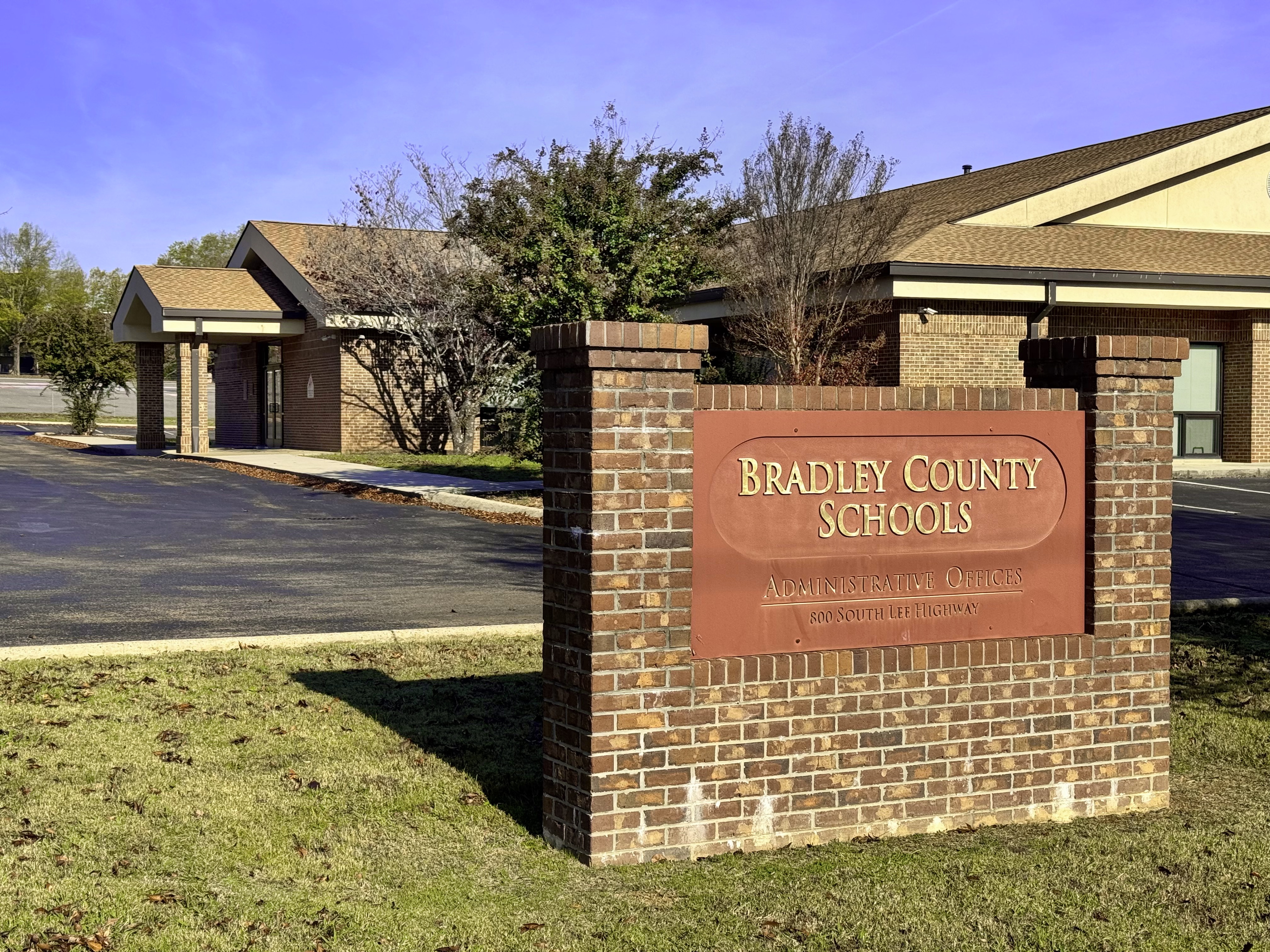
Bradley County Schools administrative offices

Bradley County Schools is a public school system based in Bradley County, Tennessee, United States. All students living in the county attend these schools, except for those living in Cleveland; students in Cleveland attend schools in the Cleveland City Schools district.

== High schools ==
- Bradley Central High School
- Walker Valley High School
- GOAL Academy - alternative high school
- REACH Adult High School - alternative high school

== Middle schools ==
- Lake Forest Middle School
- Ocoee Middle School

== Elementary schools ==
- Black Fox Elementary School
- Charleston Elementary School
- Hopewell Elementary School
- Michigan Avenue Elementary School
- North Lee Elementary School
- Oak Grove Elementary School
- Park View Elementary School
- Prospect Elementary School
- Taylor Elementary School
- Valley View Elementary School
- Waterville Community Elementary School

== History ==
Schools have existed in Bradley County since its inception. Public schools have been in existence in Bradley County since at least 1871, and the name "Bradley County Schools" has been used for the district since at least the 1880s. The first reported superintendent was M.R. Burke, elected in 1885. The first public high schools in the county were Charleston High School in Charleston, opened in 1913, and Central High School in Cleveland, opened in 1916. Central High School was renamed Bradley County High School in 1920 and Bradley Central High School in 1948. Bradley Central was originally located at the current site of Ocoee Middle School, but was moved to its current location in 1972. Charleston High School was replaced with Walker Valley High School in 2001.
