= Hiwassee River Heritage Center =

- Established: May 17, 2013
- Location: 8746 Hiwassee Street; Charleston, Tennessee, United States
- Coordinates: 35°16′51″N 84°45′40″W
- Type: History museum
- Owner: Charleston-Calhoun-Hiwassee Historical Society
- Website: www.hiwasseeheritage.com

The Hiwassee River Heritage Center is a history museum located in Charleston, Tennessee which was established in 2013. The museum chronicles the region's Cherokee and Civil War history. It is a certified interpretive center on the Trail of Tears National Historic Trail.

== Historical background ==
Prior to the arrival of the first European settlers, the area where Charleston and Bradley County is located was occupied by the Cherokee. The land north of the Hiwassee River, located less than 1 mile (1.6 km) north of the heritage center, was purchased by the U.S. government from the Cherokee Nation in 1819, and in 1821, the Indian Agency was moved to present-day Charleston a short distance from the heritage center. The city of Calhoun, is located directly across the Hiwassee River from Charleston in McMinn County, and the two cities were often referred to as twin cities. Between 1832 and the Cherokee removal in 1838, the Red Clay Council Grounds, now a state park by the same name, served as the final eastern capitol of the Cherokee Nation. Charleston served as the headquarters for the Cherokee removal, part of the Trail of Tears, and Fort Cass was constructed in 1835 around the Indian Agency to house captured Cherokees and U.S. troops in preparation for the removal. Additional internment camps were located in the valleys south of Fort Cass between Charleston and Cleveland, including two of the largest at Rattlesnake Springs. After the Cherokee removal, the area saw significant activity during the American Civil War, such as the November 1861 burning of the nearby Hiwassee River bridge in the East Tennessee bridge burnings, the usage of the Henegar House by both Union and Confederate generals for temporary headquarters, and the Confederate hospital at Charleston Cumberland Presbyterian Church.

== Description and history ==
The Hiwassee River Heritage Center consists of an interpretive center, located in a former bank building, that contains panels which give detailed history primarily of the area's Cherokee and Civil War history, as well as additional information. The center also contains Cherokee and Civil War artifacts, and contains the 2012 painting Sherman Leaving the Henegar House by Don Troiani, which depicts Union general William Tecumseh Sherman and his troops departing from the Henegar House on the night of November 30, 1863. Other exhibits include information about local African American history, the Tennessee Valley, and the city of Charleston's role in the filming of the 1960 film Wild River. The heritage center also consists of a short outdoor trail, called the National Historic Trail Experience, which contains a series of signs which give information about the Cherokee removal and preceding events from both the Cherokee's and the European's perspectives. The Hiwassee River Heritage Center is one of five sites listed as interpretive centers on the Trail of Tears National Historic Trail located in Bradley County.

The Hiwassee River Heritage Center was spearheaded by the Charleston-Calhoun-Hiwassee Historical society, which began planning for the project in 2011. The Hiwassee River Heritage Center officially opened on May 17, 2013. The panels were produced by Middle Tennessee State University's Center for Historical Preservation. The groundbreaking for the expansion of the center, which included construction of the National Historic Trail Experience and the addition of more exhibit space and a meeting room, as well as renovation of the exterior of the building, took place on August 26, 2016. The expansion was dedicated on March 30, 2019.

== See also ==
- Red Clay State Park
- Museum Center at Five Points
- Cherokee Trail of Tears State Park

== Bibliography ==
- Corn, James F. (1959). Red Clay and Rattlesnake Springs: A History of the Cherokee Indians of Bradley County, Tennessee. Marceline, MO: Walsworth Publishing Company.
- Duncan, Barbara R.; Riggs, Brett H. (2003). Cherokee Heritage Trails Guidebook. Chapel Hill, North Carolina: University of North Carolina Press. ISBN 0-8078-5457-3.
- Lillard, Roy G. (1980). Bradley County. Memphis, Tennessee: Memphis State University Press. ISBN 0-87870-099-4.
