= Chatata =

Historic area in Bradley County, Tennessee, United States

Coordinates: 35°12′42″N 84°48′15″W

Chatata, meaning "clear water", is the original Cherokee name of an area located in Bradley County, Tennessee. Today the name survives in references to a number of locations in Bradley County, most notably Chatata Valley in the northeastern part of the county. Chatata was also the original name of an unincorporated community in this region now known as Tasso.

== Description ==
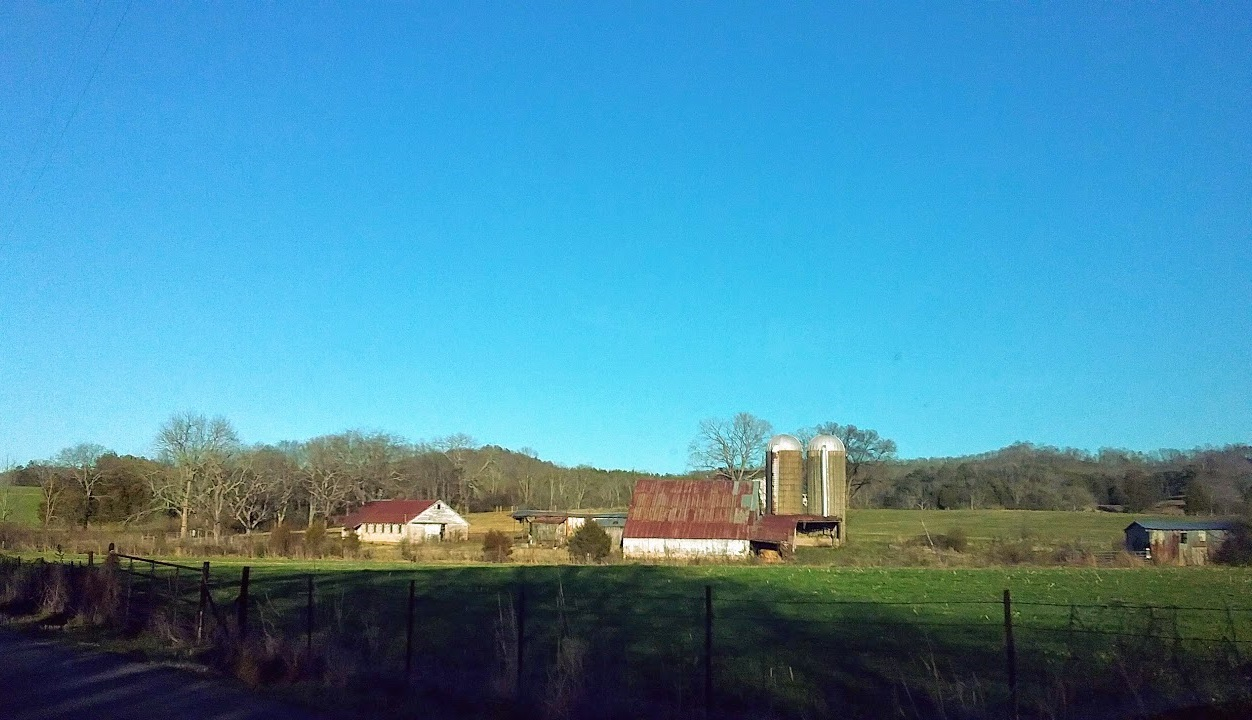
Farms in Chatata Valley

The area originally called Chatata by the Cherokee consists of a geographical area located predominantly in northeastern Bradley County, but can also refer to locations west of this area. The name is best recognized in Chatata Valley, as well as Chatata Creek, which flows through this valley into the Hiwassee River to the north, and Little Chatata Creek, which flows in the next valley to the west. This area is located in the Ridge and Valley physiographic province of the Great Appalachian Valley, with a series of paralleling ridges running approximately north-northeast with valleys in between. The Hiwassee forms the northern boundary of Bradley County, and the Chatata area contains some of the lowest elevations in the county.

Chatata Valley and portions of the surrounding valleys reportedly contain some of the most fertile soils in the region, which were originally cultivated by the Cherokee. The region contains a number of sites that were significant to the Cherokee, including Rattlesnake Springs and Beeler Spring.

Today, Chatata Valley and the surrounding valleys remain some of the most productive agricultural areas in the region, with many large farms that raise cattle and grow crops including corn, soybeans, tobacco, and fruits and vegetables, as well as some dairy farms.

== History ==
Before the arrival of the first European settlers, this area was inhabited by the Cherokee. A number of Cherokee settlements were located in the Chatata region, including a settlement called Fishtown, which was located two miles south of present day Tasso in present day Cleveland. The Cherokee reportedly held council at Rattlesnake Springs and Beeler Spring, and a number of Cherokee burial grounds are known to be located in the region including at Rattlesnake Springs and on Beeler Ridge. The Chatata region was reportedly a preferred farming region to the Cherokee, due to its fertile soils and excellent water sources.

In the early nineteenth century European settlers began moving into the Chatata region in anticipation of the forced removal of the Cherokee, and in 1821, the Indian Agency, the official liaison between the U.S. government and the Cherokee Nation, was established in present day Charleston on the Hiwassee River in northern Bradley County. The Chatata region played a significant role during the Cherokee removal, with operations headquartered at Fort Cass in Charleston and several internment camps located in the region, with one of the largest at Rattlesnake Springs.

The legislation creating Bradley County by the Tennessee General Assembly on February 10, 1836 mandated that county governmental activities be held at McCaslin's Methodist Campground in Chatata Valley until the location for the county seat of Cleveland was chosen. As part of the United States Bicentennial celebration, the Bradley County Quarterly Court held a meeting at this location in 1976. Early on, Chatata Valley had mills, stores, churches, two schools, and a physician. The Chatata Seminary, a boarding school, was established in Chatata Valley in 1867, and operated until about 1878. The name Chatata was given to the Tasso community at some point before the American Civil War, before being renamed in 1905. The railroad was constructed between Cleveland and Charleston in phases during the 1850s. Today, the Chatata region contains a number of historical sites, including a few homes that predate the Civil War.

During the Civil War, Union troops under the command of general William T. Sherman camped in the valley directly east of Tasso and the railroad on multiple occasions in 1863. These troops reportedly abandoned at least one cannon in Little Chatata Creek south of Tasso after it got stuck in the creekbed while they were crossing. This was also near the location of an unsuccessful attempt in the spring of 1864 by Confederate troops to destroy a passing union train with an explosive placed on the tracks, which instead resulted in the destruction of a passing Confederate train. A Confederate cavalry sword believed to have been from this wreck was accidentally discovered by a teenager in 1970. Troops under the command of Sherman also camped at the Blue Springs Encampments and Fortifications in southern Bradley County.

The name Chatata is also archaeologically, geologically, and paleontologically significant because of the so-called Chatata Wall excavated in 1891 in northwestern Bradley County. That year, Isaac Hooper noticed a line of sandstone rocks protruding from the surface of his farm every 10 metres (33 ft) or so over a gently curving arc about 300 metres (980 ft) long. Unusual symbols seemed to be inscribed on one of these surface stones.

Visiting New York City professor Albert Leighton Rawson took an interest in this outcropping of rocks. Rawson (1829–1902) was a historian, writer and spiritualist who was the author of many late 19th century religious tracts and books including Evolution of Israel's God. He had participated in and organized outdoor religious meetings set among areas of striking natural and geological beauty in New York, most notably the 1878 Watkins Glen Freethinkers Convention. Intrigued by the Chatata site, he funded excavations there. A 1 metre (3.3 ft) high three-ply sandstone wall was unearthed with markings located on one surface of the middle layer. Rawson believed these markings to be Hebrew and claimed to have translated several chapters of the Old Testament from them, evidence to him that one or more of the Ten Lost Tribes of Israel had arrived in Tennessee before Europeans or possibly even the Cherokee. Subsequent visits to the site by other scientists, and samples from the Wall displayed for a time at the Smithsonian Institution, failed to generate support for Rawson's claims. The Chatata Wall faded from the public limelight, and today its exact location is effectively unknown. Eventually, the Chatata Wall was ultimately judged to be a natural phenomenon with only a minority of amateur investigators looking for evidence of ancient human origins for the markings.

== See also ==
- Red Clay State Park
- New Echota

== Bibliography ==
- Hardy, Lucina Welch (March 1962). An Album of Historical Memories: Chatata - Tasso, Bradley County, Tennessee, 1830 -1961. Hardy & Randolph.
- Lillard, Roy G. (1980). Bradley County. Dunn, Joy Bailey., Crawford, Charles Wann, 1931-. Memphis, Tenn.: Memphis State University Press. ISBN 0878700994. OCLC 6934932.
- Corn, James F. (1959). Red Clay and Rattlesnake Springs: A History of the Cherokee Indians of Bradley County, Tennessee. Marceline, MO: Walsworth Publishing Company.
