= Museum Center =

Museum Center may refer to:

- Cincinnati Museum Center at Union Terminal, Cincinnati, Ohio, United States
- Museum Center at Five Points, Cleveland, Tennessee, United States
