= Henegar House =

Historic house in Tennessee, United States

- U.S. National Register of Historic Places
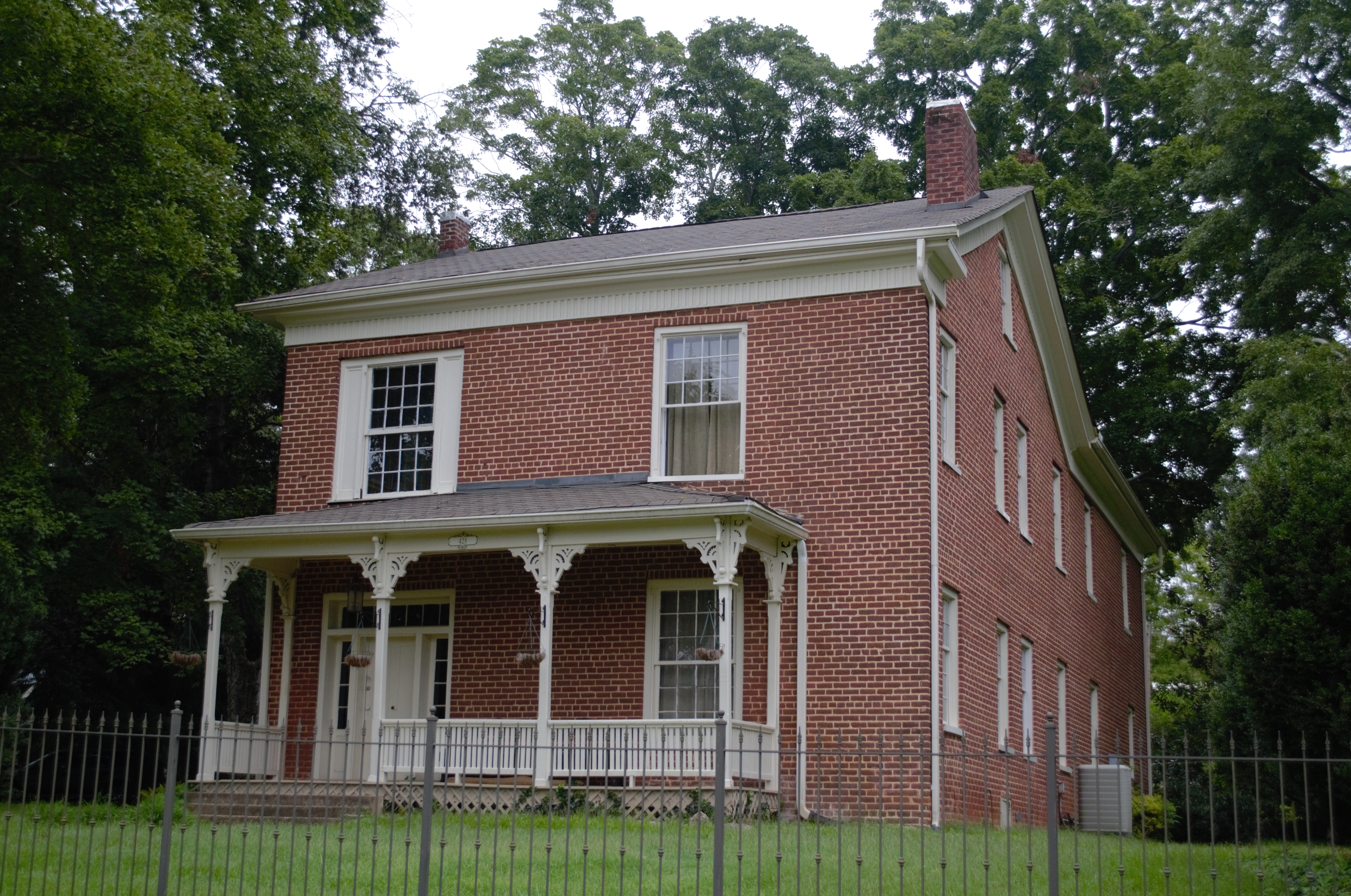
- Front of the Henegar House in Charleston, Tennessee.

- Location within Tennessee Location within the United States
- Location: 458 Market Street; Charleston, Tennessee
- Coordinates: 35°17′12″N 84°45′17″W
- Area: Less than one acre
- Built: 1849
- Architectural style: Federal
- NRHP reference No.: 76001764
- Added to NRHP: July 6, 1976

The Henegar House, also known as Ivy Hall, is a historic house in Charleston, Tennessee. Constructed in 1849, it is the oldest remaining brick structure in Bradley County. It was listed on the National Register of Historic Places (NRHP) in 1976.

== History ==
The Henegar House was constructed on the former site of the military headquarters of Gen. Winfield Scott at Fort Cass by Henry Benton Henegar, who served as wagonmaster and secretary under Chief John Ross during the Cherokee Removal known as the Trail of Tears. Henegar and his wife, Margaret Lea Henegar, returned to Charleston after the removal and constructed the home in 1849. The home was designed by architect William Baumann, and constructed in the Federal-style architecture.

During the Civil War, the home was used as headquarters for both Union and Confederate Generals including William T. Sherman, Oliver O. Howard, Marcus J. Wright, and Samuel Bolivar Buckner. While Tennessee seceded and became part of the Confederacy, most of East Tennessee, including Bradley County, voted against secession and sympathized with the Union. Sherman spent the night at the house on Nov. 30, 1863, and it was there that he received orders to take command of a column of troops moving to relieve Knoxville. According to historic records, the back porch was the site of a tense conversation between Mrs. Henegar and Sherman, in which the general advised Mrs. Henegar, who was a supporter of the Confederacy, to leave the South for safety, claiming that "not even a bird would remain" in the south after he was finished. Mrs. Henegar rejected his advice and declared that she and her husband, who was a Unionist, would never leave.

The Henegar House was listed on the NRHP on July 6, 1976. The house was added as a site to the Tennessee sites in the Civil War Trails Association's national tour in 2010. In November 2011 it was announced that painter Don Troiani had been commissioned by local businessman Allan Jones to paint the Henegar House. The painting, titled "Sherman Leaving the Henegar House - December 1, 1863", was completed in 2012, and is housed in the nearby Hiwassee River Heritage Center. The house was listed for sale in 2013.

== See also ==
- National Register of Historic Places listings in Bradley County, Tennessee
- Tennessee in the American Civil War
