= Charleston, Tennessee =

- City
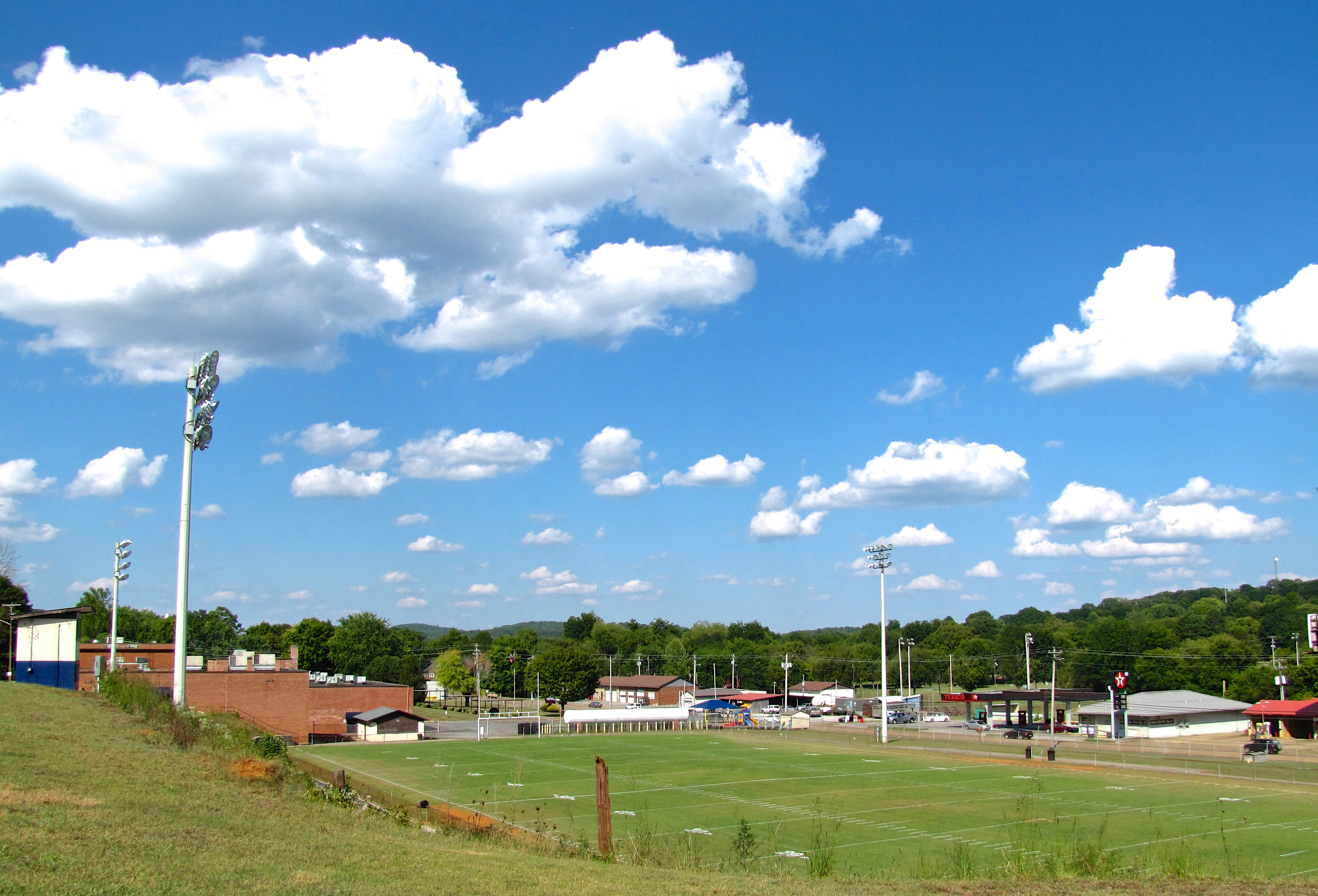
- Buildings along US-11

- Location of Charleston in Bradley County, Tennessee.
- Coordinates: 35°17′4″N 84°45′25″W
- Country: United States
- State: Tennessee
- County: Bradley
- Incorporated: November 11, 1956

Government
  - Mayor: David Lattimore

Area
  - Total: 1.07 sq mi (2.78 km^{2})
  - Land: 1.04 sq mi (2.69 km^{2})
  - Water: 0.035 sq mi (0.09 km^{2})
- Elevation: 725 ft (221 m)

Population (2020)
  - Total: 664
  - Density: 639.8/sq mi (247.04/km^{2})
- Time zone: UTC−5 (Eastern (EST))
  - Summer (DST): UTC−4 (EDT)
- ZIP code: 37310
- Area code: 423
- FIPS code: 47-13020
- GNIS feature ID: 1305866
- Website: https://www.charlestoncitytn.com/

Charleston is a city in Bradley County, Tennessee, United States. The population was 664 at the 2020 census. It is included in the Cleveland Metropolitan Statistical Area.

== History ==
Bradley County was home to the Cherokee long before European settlers arrived. What is now Charleston began around 1808 when Major John Walker Sr., a part-Cherokee grandson of Nancy Ward, established a ferry across the Hiwassee River between present-day Charleston and Calhoun. As a result, the community was initially known as "Walker's Ferry." The Hiwassee Purchase of 1819 resulted in the cession of Cherokee lands between the Hiwassee and Little Tennessee rivers to the Federal Government, and as a result, the Hiwassee River became the boundary between the Cherokee Nation and the United States, where it remained until the Cherokee removal in 1838. In 1821, the Cherokee Agency— the official liaison between the U.S. government and the Cherokee Nation— was moved to the location of present-day Charleston. The agent to the Cherokees was first Colonel Return J. Meigs Sr., who had served in the American Revolutionary War, and later Joseph McMinn, who served as Governor of Tennessee from 1815 to 1821. Lewis Ross, the brother of Chief John Ross, constructed a home nearby in 1820, and established a trading post and store in the city the following year. Between 1832 and the Cherokee removal in 1838, the Red Clay Council Grounds in southern Bradley County, now a state park by the same name, served as the final eastern capitol of the Cherokee Nation.

In the 1820s and 1830s, many white settlers began to move into the area anticipating a future forced removal of the Cherokee by the Federal Government. At times, these settlers came into conflict with the Cherokee, who resisted settlers who tried to take over their territory. After the passage of the Indian Removal Act of 1830, Fort Cass was constructed in Charleston as the headquarters of the Cherokee removal, which was initiated by the Treaty of New Echota in December 1835. During the summer of 1838, thousands of Cherokees from various locations were held in internment camps at the fort under the supervision of federal troops before starting their journey westward, which became known as the Trail of Tears. Several other internment camps were located in the valleys between Charleston and present-day Cleveland, Tennessee over a distance of 12 miles (19 km), including one at nearby Rattlesnake Springs.

During the Civil War the Henegar House, the oldest remaining brick structure in Bradley County, was used as headquarters by both Union and Confederate generals including William T. Sherman, Oliver O. Howard, Marcus J. Wright, and Simon Bolivar Buckner. It was here that on November 30, 1863, Sherman reportedly advised the Henegar family to flee the south, stating that "not even a bird would remain" once he was finished and foreshadowing his March to the Sea the following year. The Charleston Cumberland Presbyterian Church building was used as a hospital by Confederate Forces in 1863. The railroad bridge over the Hiwassee River in Charleston was destroyed as part of the East Tennessee bridge burnings in November 1861.

From 1925 to 1927, a section of U.S. Route 11 was constructed through Charleston. The portion through downtown was bypassed by the present-day alignment to the west in 1940. The original highway still exists as parts of Market and Water Streets, and on January 10, 2008, was listed on the National Register of Historic Places as the Cleveland to Charleston Concrete Highway.

Charleston was incorporated on November 11, 1956. Several areas in and around Charleston were used as the primary filming locations for the 1960 Elia Kazan film Wild River. The city's business district served as the fictional Garthville in the film.

Charleston was the first city in Tennessee to elect a black mayor and the first city to appoint a black police chief.

== Geography ==
Charleston is situated along the south bank of the Hiwassee River, which flows down out of the Blue Ridge Mountains several miles to the east and empties into the Chickamauga Lake impoundment of the Tennessee River several miles to the west. The river forms the boundary between Bradley County and McMinn County. Calhoun, Charleston's sister city, is situated on the north bank of the Hiwassee, on the McMinn County side. In 2026, Tennessee Valley Authority released a map showing that approximately 50 structures in Charleston would be flooded in the event that North Carolina's Chatuge Dam were to fail.

Charleston is traversed by U.S. Route 11, which enters the city from Calhoun to the north and exits the city en route to Cleveland to the south. Interstate 75, which roughly parallels U.S. 11 in the area, runs about 2 miles (3.2 km) west of Charleston, and is connected to the city by State Route 308.

According to the United States Census Bureau, the city has a total area of 1.0 square mile (2.6 km^{2}), of which 0.1 square miles (0.26 km^{2}), or 5.77%, is water.

=== Climate ===
The climate in this area is characterized by hot, humid summers and generally mild to cool winters. According to the Köppen climate classification system, Charleston has a humid subtropical climate, abbreviated "Cfa" on climate maps.

== Demographics ==
Historical population
| Census | Pop. | Note | %± |
|---|---|---|---|
| 1880 | 359 | | — |
| 1890 | 394 | | 9.7% |
| 1960 | 764 | | — |
| 1970 | 792 | | 3.7% |
| 1980 | 756 | | −4.5% |
| 1990 | 653 | | −13.6% |
| 2000 | 630 | | −3.5% |
| 2010 | 651 | | 3.3% |
| 2020 | 664 | | 2.0% |

=== 2020 census ===
As of the 2020 census, Charleston had a population of 664, 293 households, and 199 families residing in the city. The median age was 42.2 years, 21.5% of residents were under the age of 18, and 16.3% of residents were 65 years of age or older. For every 100 females there were 101.8 males, and for every 100 females age 18 and over there were 99.6 males age 18 and over.

0.0% of residents lived in urban areas, while 100.0% lived in rural areas.

Of the 293 households in Charleston, 30.4% had children under the age of 18 living in them. Of all households, 39.2% were married-couple households, 25.9% were households with a male householder and no spouse or partner present, and 28.0% were households with a female householder and no spouse or partner present. About 32.1% of all households were made up of individuals and 11.2% had someone living alone who was 65 years of age or older.

There were 316 housing units, of which 7.3% were vacant. The homeowner vacancy rate was 0.0% and the rental vacancy rate was 7.2%.

Racial composition as of the 2020 census
| Race | Number | Percent |
|---|---|---|
| White | 490 | 73.8% |
| Black or African American | 101 | 15.2% |
| American Indian and Alaska Native | 2 | 0.3% |
| Asian | 4 | 0.6% |
| Native Hawaiian and Other Pacific Islander | 0 | 0.0% |
| Some other race | 4 | 0.6% |
| Two or more races | 63 | 9.5% |
| Hispanic or Latino (of any race) | 29 | 4.4% |

=== 2010 census ===
As of the census of 2010, there was a population of 651, with 253 households and 166 families residing in the city. The population density was 651 people per square mile. The housing unit density was 253 units per square mile. The racial makeup of the city was 77.27% White, 19.82% African American, 0.15% Native American, 0.31% Asian, 1.69% from other races, and 0.77% from two or more races. Hispanics or Latinos of any race were 4.15% of the population.

Of the 253 households, 30.04% had children under the age of 18 living with them, 47.83% were married couples living together, 11.46% had a female householder with no husband present, 6.32% had a male householder with no wife present, and 34.39% were non-families. 30.43% of all households were made up of individuals, and 11.86% had someone living alone who was 65 years of age or older. The average household size was 2.57 and the average family size was 3.23.

In the city, the population was spread out, with 26.27% under the age of 18, 60.37% ages 18 to 64, and 13.36% age 65 and older. The median age was 38.6 years. 50.54% of the population were females, and 49.46% were males.

The median household income was $34,805, and the median family income was $48,333. Males had a median income of $32,188, versus $30,750 for females. The per capita income for the city was $20,587. About 8.0% of families and 10.8% of the population were below the poverty line, including 6.1% of those under age 18 and 26.4% of those age 65 and over.

=== 2000 census ===
As of the census of 2000, there was a population of 630, with 265 households and 182 families residing in the city. The population density was 639.9 inhabitants per square mile (247.1/km^{2}). There were 280 housing units at an average density of 284.4 per square mile (109.8/km^{2}). The racial makeup of the city was 72.54% White, 23.49% African American, 0.48% Asian, 0.79% from other races, and 2.70% from two or more races. Hispanic or Latino of any race were 1.90% of the population.

There were 265 households, out of which 24.9% had children under the age of 18 living with them, 56.2% were married couples living together, 9.8% had a female householder with no husband present, and 31.3% were non-families. 29.1% of all households were made up of individuals, and 12.5% had someone living alone who was 65 years of age or older. The average household size was 2.38 and the average family size was 2.92.

In the city, the population was spread out, with 22.5% under the age of 18, 8.3% from 18 to 24, 26.7% from 25 to 44, 26.8% from 45 to 64, and 15.7% who were 65 years of age or older. The median age was 39 years. For every 100 females, there were 91.5 males. For every 100 females age 18 and over, there were 88.4 males.

The median income for a household in the city was $33,750, and the median income for a family was $40,781. Males had a median income of $31,389 versus $18,333 for females. The per capita income for the city was $18,586. About 5.7% of families and 8.6% of the population were below the poverty line, including 14.0% of those under age 18 and 12.9% of those age 65 or over.

== Economy ==
The city is across the Hiwassee River from a large paper mill operation of Resolute Forest Products in Calhoun, which is a major local employer. Logging trucks and rail traffic to and from this plant frequently traverse Charleston.

Charleston is the postal address of the international headquarters of the Christian denomination The Church of God, commonly called "The Church of God (Charleston, Tennessee)" to distinguish it from other similarly named denominations. However, the denomination's headquarters are actually located in Cleveland.

Olin Chemical and Lonza, both located on Old Lower River Road in Charleston, make pool chemicals as well as several other products. They employ several hundred people.

GE Lighting (DHL Supply Chain) broke ground right off the interstate in 2007 and employs several hundreds of people, distributing General Electric light bulbs. An Amazon Fulfillment Center, located off the interstate in Charleston, employs several hundred people.

Germany-based chemical company Wacker Chemie broke ground in 2011 on a new solar-grade polysilicon production facility (550-acre Greenfield site). At a cost of $2 billion, 650 new jobs were generated.

== Arts and culture ==
The International Cowpea Festival and Cook-off, commonly referred to as the Cowpea Festival, takes place in Charleston each year of the second Saturday in September.

The Hiwassee River Heritage Center in Charleston, opened in 2013, showcases the history of the Cherokee Nation and Removal in the area. The center was expanded in 2019 to include a portion of the Trail of Tears National Historic Trail.

== Bibliography ==
- Duncan, Barbara R.; Riggs, Brett H. (2003). Cherokee Heritage Trails Guidebook. Chapel Hill, North Carolina: University of North Carolina Press. ISBN 0-8078-5457-3.
- Lillard, Roy G. (1980). Bradley County. Memphis, Tennessee: Memphis State University Press. ISBN 0-87870-099-4 – via Internet Archive.
