= Gloria V. Casañas =

Argentine writer

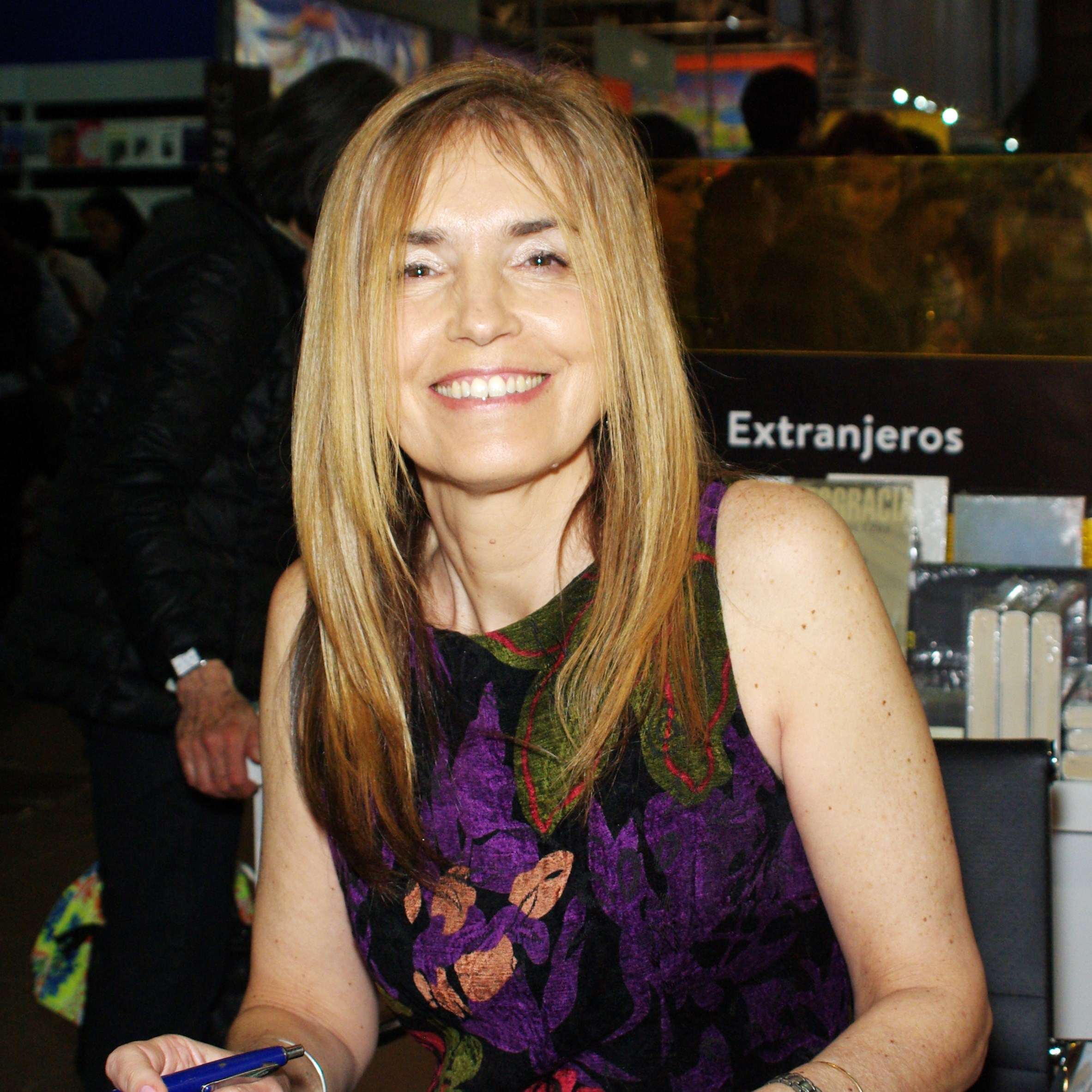
- Gloria Casañas at the Santiago International Book Fair 2015. Photo by Rodrigo Fernández.
- Born: August 22, 1964 (age 61) Buenos Aires, Argentina
- Occupation: writer, novelist

Gloria V. Casañas (born 22 August 1964, in Buenos Aires) is an Argentine writer of historical fiction and romance novels.

Although she confesses to having written all of her life, her first published work was En alas de la seducción (On the Wings of Seduction) in 2008. This was followed by La Maestra de la laguna (The Teacher from the Lagoon) in 2010, which became a best-seller and rose her to notoriety amongst fans of the genre. The book tells the story of Elizabeth O'Connor, a Bostonian teacher who is recruited by Domingo Faustino Sarmiento to provide elementary education to Indians and Whites alike in the arid plains of Argentina. The novel’s success led to a stint giving courses on Contemporary Latin American Literature of the Southern Cone for the Department of World Languages of Framingham State University, Massachusetts, during the fall of 2014.

Other works include Yporâ (2011, set during the Paraguayan War, won Reader's Prize at the 38th International Buenos Aires Book Fair), El ángel roto (The Broken Angel, 2012, spin-off of The Teacher from the Lagoon), La canción del mar (The Song of the Sea, 2013), Por el sendero de las lágrimas (Through the Trail of Tears (2014, about the Cherokee removal), La salvaje de Boston (The Boston Savage, 2016, also set in the Teacher from the Lagoon continuity) and Noche de Luna Larga (Long Moon Night, 2016). She also wrote a short story for the anthology Ay, Amor (Oh, Love, 2014).

Her writing is characterized by exhaustive historical research.

== Novels ==
- En alas de la Seducción. Penguin Random House. 2008
- La maestra de la laguna. Penguin Random House. 2010
- Yporâ. Penguin Random House. 2011
- El ángel roto. Penguin Random House. 2012
- La canción del mar. Penguin Random House. 2013
- Por el sendero de las lágrimas. Penguin Random House. 2014
- La salvaje de Boston. Penguin Random House. 2016
- Noche de luna larga. (Tres lunas de Navidad). Penguin Random House. 2016
- Luna quebrada. Penguin Random House. 2017
- La mirada del Puma. Penguin Random House. 2018
- Sombras en la Luna. Penguin Random House. 2018
- En el huerto de las Mujercitas. Penguin Random House. 2019
