= Red Clay State Historic Park =

State park in Tennessee, United States

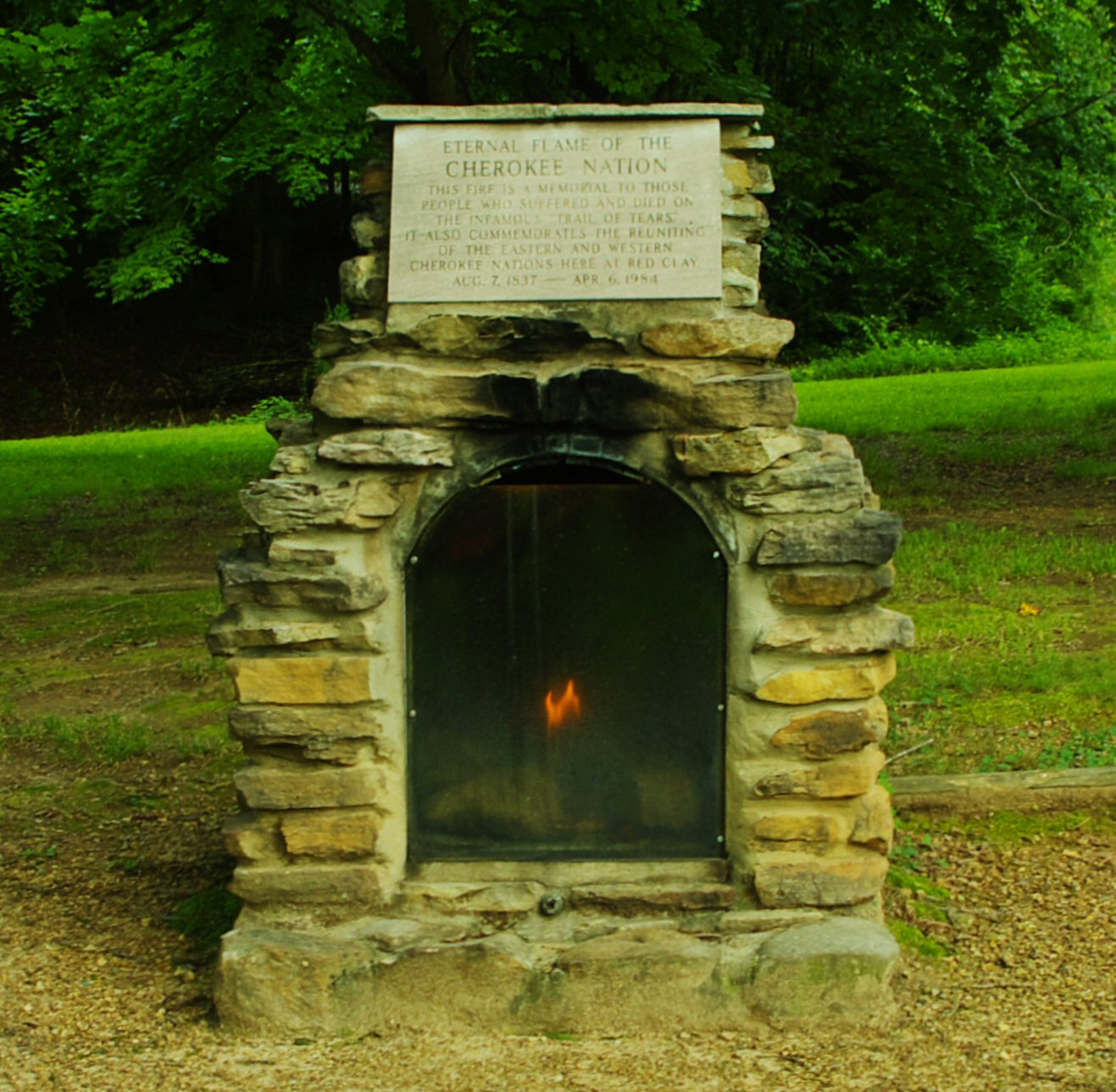
- Eternal Flame of the Cherokee Nation
- Interactive map of Red Clay State Historic Park
- Type: Tennessee State Park
- Location: Bradley County, Tennessee, United States
- Area: 263 acres (1.06 km^{2})
- Established: 1979
- Red Clay Council Ground
- U.S. National Register of Historic Places
- Location within Tennessee Location within the United States
- Nearest city: Cleveland, Tennessee
- Area: 150 acres (61 ha)
- Website: Red Clay Historic State Park
- NRHP reference No.: 72001229
- Added to NRHP: September 14, 1972
- Open: Year round

Red Clay State Historic Park is a state park located in southern Bradley County, Tennessee, United States. The park preserves the Red Clay Council Grounds, which were the site of the last capital of the Cherokee Nation in the eastern United States from 1832 to 1838 before the enforcement of the Indian Removal Act of 1830. This act resulted in a forced migration of most of the Cherokee people to present-day Oklahoma known as the Cherokee removal. At the council grounds, the Cherokee made multiple unsuccessful pleas to the U.S. government to be allowed to remain in their ancestral homeland. The site is considered sacred to the Cherokees and includes the Blue Hole Spring, a large hydrological spring. It is also listed as an interpretive center along the Trail of Tears National Historic Trail.

After the Cherokee removal, the site became private land and was primarily used for agriculture. In the later part of the 20th century, a group of local historians undertook an effort to preserve and protect the site and turn it into a state park. The site was named to the National Register of Historic Places (NRHP) in 1972, and Red Clay State Park opened to the public in 1979. It encompasses 263 acres (1.06 km^{2}) of land immediately north of the Tennessee–Georgia state line and consists of a museum, replicas of Cherokee structures that once stood on the site, and three hiking trails, along with other amenities.

== History ==
=== Cherokee history ===
Before the arrival of the first European settlers, the area was inhabited by the Cherokees, an Iroquoian-speaking people believed to have migrated south from the Great Lakes area, where other Iroquoian tribes arose. Their territory encompassed parts of present-day western North Carolina, western South Carolina, East Tennessee, northern Georgia, and northern Alabama. The Cherokee peoples in Tennessee were known by European settlers as Overhill Cherokee because they lived west of the Blue Ridge Mountains. In the late 18th and early 19th centuries, the Cherokees organized a national government modeled on the United States Constitution and were recognized by European Americans as one of the Five Civilized Tribes. After the Hiwassee Purchase of 1819, in which the Cherokees ceded their lands between the Hiwassee and Little Tennessee rivers to the federal government, the Indian Agency—the official liaison between the U.S. government and the Cherokee Nation—was moved to the site of present-day Charleston along the Hiwassee in 1821, which is located approximately 23 mi (37 km) northeast of Red Clay. In anticipation of a forced removal of the Cherokees by the federal government, White settlers began rapidly moving into the area.

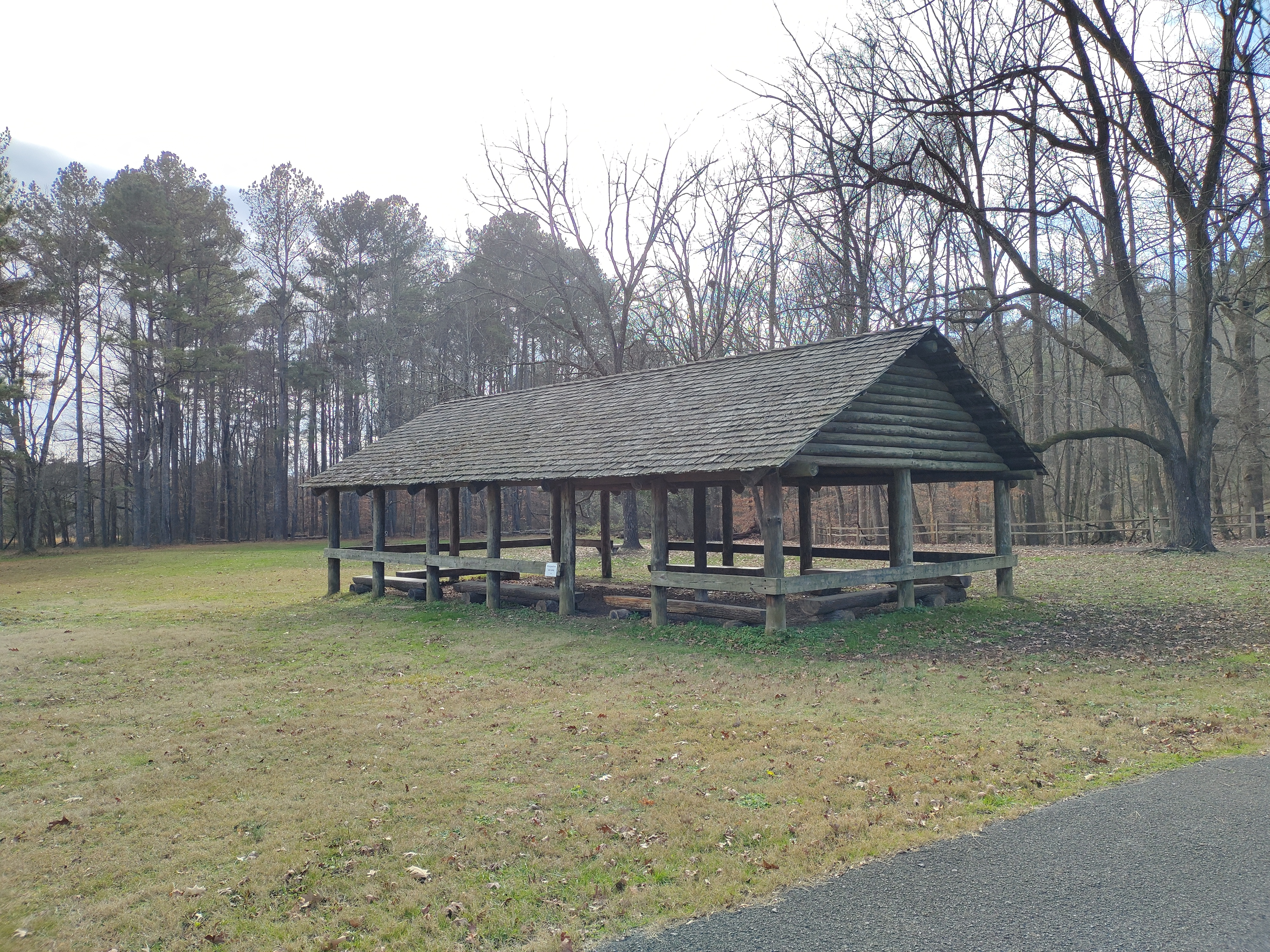
A replica of the Council House at Red Clay State Park

Between 1827 and 1831, Georgia legislators passed a series of laws that prohibited the Cherokees from holding public meetings and nullified all Cherokee laws within their borders. In 1830, the federal government passed the Indian Removal Act, which authorized then-President Andrew Jackson to negotiate removal treaties with Native American tribes in the Southeastern United States. As a result of these actions, the Cherokees began to vacate their capital of New Echota, with the council temporarily meeting in Chattooga, Alabama, in 1831. The following year, the Cherokee Nation permanently moved the seat of their government to Red Clay due to the site's central location and the abundant water source from the Blue Hole Spring, which they considered sacred. By 1836, the site had grown to include 91 log buildings.

A total of eleven general councils were held at Red Clay between 1832 and 1838 under the command of Principal Chief John Ross, each attended by an estimated 4,000 to 5,000 Cherokees. During the meetings, the Cherokees sent delegations to Washington, D.C. to argue to Congress and the President on their behalf, and repeatedly rejected agreements to surrender their lands east of the Mississippi River and move west. While these councils were ongoing, a pro-removal faction known as the Treaty Party arose within the Cherokee Nation, led by Major Ridge, his son John Ridge, Elias Boudinot, and Stand Watie. This faction believed that removal was inevitable and in the best interest of the Cherokee people. On December 29, 1835, they secretly signed the Treaty of New Echota at their former capital, without authorization from the national council at Red Clay.

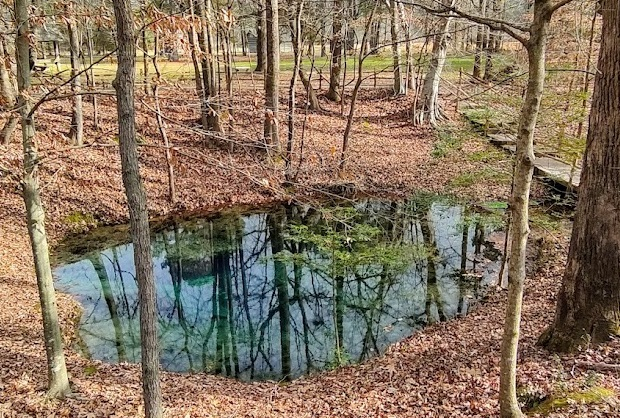
The Blue Hole Spring, which was considered sacred to the Cherokees

The Treaty of New Echota was considered by many Cherokees to be an act of treason and was rejected by the council at Red Clay on February 2, 1836. Later that month, two councils convened at Red Clay and Valley Town, North Carolina (now Murphy, North Carolina) and produced two lists totaling some 13,000 names, written in the Sequoyah writing script of the Cherokee language, of Cherokees who were opposed to the treaty. The lists were dispatched to Washington, D.C., and presented by John Ross to Congress. Nevertheless, a slightly modified version of the treaty was ratified by the U.S. Senate by a single vote on May 23, 1836, and signed into law by Andrew Jackson. The treaty provided a grace period until May 1838 for the Cherokees to voluntarily relocate themselves. To prevent a Cherokee uprising, Brigadier General John E. Wool ordered approximately 300 men to take up position near the Red Clay Council Grounds in mid-1836. The final council at Red Clay took place in August 1837, in which the Cherokees made a final unsuccessful effort to retain their lands. The Cherokee removal officially began on May 26, 1838, and the Cherokee agency at Charleston served as the military operational headquarters for the removal, with Fort Cass constructed on the site to house detainees. Many additional detention camps were located in northern Bradley County between Charleston and Cleveland, with two of the largest at Rattlesnake Springs, where tribal officials agreed to continue their system of government in their new home. The removal became known as the Trail of Tears.

=== Post-removal ===
A village known as Red Clay was established south of the park on February 29, 1840, in the present location of Cohutta, Georgia. A large tract of land that includes the site of the park was sold by the state government to Frank Kincannon and John D. Traynor in 1841. Another tract was sold to John B. Marston the following year. The railroad, which had been planned through the area prior to the Cherokee removal, was completed in 1852, and a train depot and section house known as both "Red Clay" and "State Line" was constructed on the site. Most of the council grounds remained farmland. At least three skirmishes took place along the railroad at Red Clay during the American Civil War. On November 27, 1863, two days after the end of the Chattanooga campaign, Union troops destroyed the depot and tracks at Red Clay in an attempt to prevent the Confederate Army from using the railroad through the area. Beginning in 1864, the site was used by the Army of the Ohio as a staging ground in preparation for the Atlanta campaign, with additional troops under the command of William Tecumseh Sherman arriving months later. A group of Union scouts engaged in a skirmish nearby on May 3 of that year, and the troops began moving south four days later.

The railroad depot and section house were rebuilt sometime after the Civil War and were later demolished, probably in the 1930s. The land that is now Red Clay State Park was sold and divided multiple times in the roughly 100 years after the Civil War and continued to be used as farmland. An African American church and cemetery are also speculated to have existed on the site sometime after the Civil War. By the 1930s, the exact location of the council grounds had been forgotten, and some speculated that they may have been located in Georgia. This misunderstanding likely resulted from the Red Clay community's location in present-day Cohutta. Local historian John Morgan Wooten conducted research in 1934 and 1935 that established the approximate location of the council grounds. However, the Georgia chapter of the Daughters of the American Revolution placed a historical marker commemorating the site less than 1/2 mi (0.80 km) south of the state line on November 10, 1935.

=== State Park history and events ===
In the late 1950s, an effort arose, spearheaded by some local historians, to preserve the land of the Red Clay Council Grounds, then private land, and turn it into a state park. Local historian James F. Corn purchased 150 acres (61 ha) of the property on June 15, 1964, and six months later, the Cherokee-Red Clay Association was incorporated. In January 1970, Corn reached an agreement with the Bradley County Quarterly Court for them to purchase the land for the purpose of developing it into a tourist attraction. The following year, Bill Jenkins, then the Commissioner of the Tennessee Department of Conservation who later became a congressman, began working with then-Governor Winfield Dunn to appropriate funds for the establishment of the state park. The Red Clay Council Grounds were added to the National Register of Historic Places (NRHP) on September 14, 1972, and later that month, the Army Corps of Engineers committed to aiding the project. In October 1972, the preliminary planning study for the park was completed. A series of archaeological excavations on the site took place between 1973 and 1975 and uncovered a small number of artifacts. In June 1974, excavations by the Department of Conservation's Division of Archaeology in partnership with Lee College sought to uncover various artifacts and structures known to have been on the grounds. These studies ultimately failed to determine the location of the council house. The state of Tennessee purchased most of the land for the park on September 27, 1974, with an additional tract acquired on March 11, 1977.

A dedication ceremony for the park that was organized as part of the local United States Bicentennial celebrations took place on May 8, 1976, in a ceremony attended by members of the Eastern Band of Cherokee Indians and local, state, and federal leaders. At the event, a sign providing an overview of the site's history was unveiled to the public, and the Tennessee Historical Commission placed a historical marker about the grounds a short time before this event on Tennessee State Route 60 a few miles to the east. A groundbreaking ceremony for the park occurred on April 26, 1978, officiated by local, state, federal, and tribal leaders. Red Clay State Historic Park opened to the public on September 28, 1979, with a ceremony overseen by state, community, and tribal dignitaries. The southeasternmost 1.11 acres (0.45 ha) were added to the park on July 2, 1980.

The Eternal Flame of the Cherokee Nation, a memorial to the Cherokees who suffered and died during the removal, was placed on the site on April 6, 1984, at an event attended by both the Eastern Band of Cherokee Indians and the Cherokee Nation of Oklahoma. This was the first time the two tribes were reunited since the removal. Between April 17 and 19, 2009, a joint council again convened at Red Clay to commemorate the 25th anniversary of the 1984 event. On August 22 and 23, 2015, the three federally recognized Cherokee tribes; the Eastern Band of Cherokee Indians, the Cherokee Nation, and the United Keetoowah Band of Cherokee Indians; reconvened at Red Clay State Park for the first time since the removal. The park has also hosted several recurring events. Between 1982 and 2001, an event called the Cherokee Days of Celebration (known as Cherokeefest until 1986) was held at the park in August and sponsored by the state. The festival returned in 2003 as the Cherokee Cultural Celebration. The event, sponsored by the Eastern Band of Cherokee Indians and other groups, features exhibitions about Cherokee culture and heritage. Friends of Red Clay was established as a nonprofit organization in 2007, and hosted an annual pow-wow in October, the last of which occurred in 2019. Part of the third episode of the PBS American Experience documentary series We Shall Remain, titled "Trail of Tears", was filmed in the park in 2008. A sign designating the park as part of the Trail of Tears National Historic Trail was unveiled on February 7, 2018. A project to update the museum was completed on November 4, 2021. The blacksmith shop was added in June 2023.

== Description ==
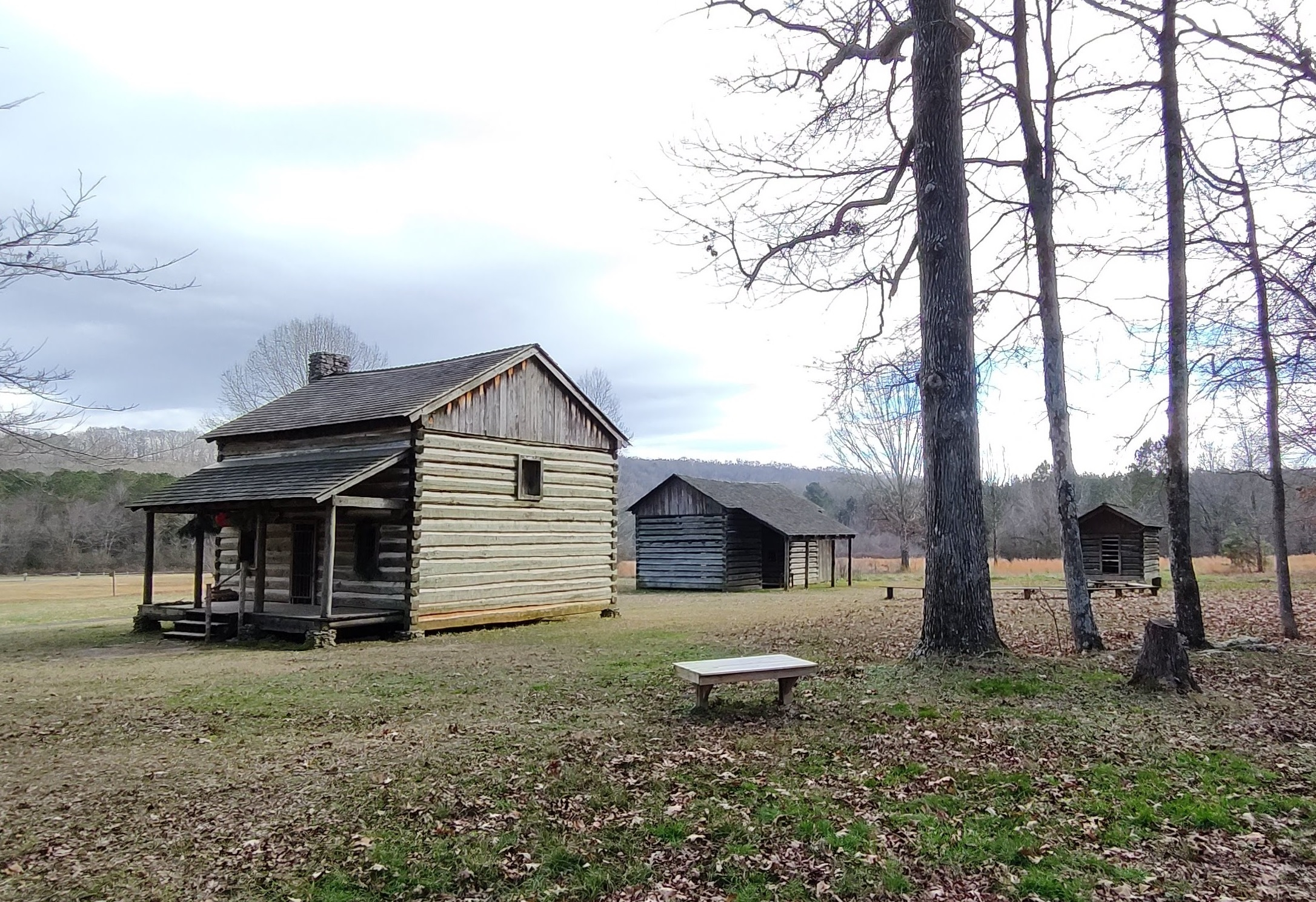
A replica of a Cherokee farmstead showing a farmhouse, barn, and corncrib

Red Clay State Historic Park is situated on approximately 263 acres (1.06 km^{2}) of land in a rural part of Bradley County, Tennessee, with the Tennessee–Georgia state line and the town of Cohutta, Georgia, forming the southern boundary. It is located in the Ridge and Valley physiographic province of the Appalachian Mountains. Elevations in the park range from slightly over 800 ft (240 m), where the council grounds were located, to more than 1,050 ft (320 m) atop a ridge. The park is home to two endangered species: the swamp lousewort and the Conasauga blue burrower crayfish. The majority of the parkland is forested. It is accessible via Red Clay Park Road, which traverses the park; the main entrance is on the north end, and a secondary entrance is located at the southeast boundary on the state line. A Norfolk Southern Railway mainline runs along the eastern fringes of the park.

A replica of a Cherokee farmstead, sleeping huts, blacksmith shop, and the council house where the council meetings took place prior to the removal are found on the location of the council grounds. Originals of all of these structures once stood on the site; however, the number of sleeping huts and other log structures was much greater. More recent historical investigations also suggest that the actual council house may have been much larger, with a smoke vent in the roof for the council fire. The park contains the iconic Blue Hole Spring, also known as the Council Spring, which was considered sacred to the Cherokees. The spring rises out of a bowl-like depression and takes its name from its deep blue color. It has a daily flow of 414,720 US gal (1,569.9 m^{3}), and its runoff flows into nearby Coahulla Creek, a tributary of the Conasauga River. Also located on the site is the Eternal Flame of the Cherokee Nation, which serves as a memorial to the Cherokees who suffered and died during the removal, and is permanently kept lit.

Overlook tower along the Council of Trees Trail

The James F. Corn Interpretive Center inside the park is a museum that features exhibits about 18th and 19th century Cherokee culture, government and politics, economy, recreation, religion and spiritual beliefs, and history. A series of stained glass windows depicts the forced removal of the Cherokee and subsequent Trail of Tears emigration. There is also a short film about the history of the site. An unmarked grave believed to belong to Sleeping Rabbit, a prominent Cherokee who fought in the War of 1812, is reportedly located in the eastern part of the park.

The park also contains three trails: the Connector Trail, Blue Hole Trail, and Council of Trees Trail, with lengths of 0.15 miles (0.24 km), 0.2 miles (0.32 km), and 1.7 miles (2.7 km), respectively. The last of these ascends the ridge on the eastern half of the park and has a stone overlook tower. Also within the park are a pavilion, picnic areas, an amphitheater which can seat about 500 people, and a mini theater. The pavilion may be reserved, and is considered "first come, first serve" otherwise.

== See also ==
- New Echota
- Fort Cass
- Hiwassee River Heritage Center
- Cherokee Trail of Tears State Park
