= Emerson's letter to Martin Van Buren =

Ralph Waldo Emerson's "Letter to Martin Van Buren" (1838) was written in response to the government's efforts to remove the Cherokee people from their native lands. In his letter to then-president Martin Van Buren, Emerson strongly represents that he, as well as other citizens of the American nation, feel that the American government is committing a serious evil crime in proceeding with the removal of the Cherokee. He stresses the efforts of the aboriginal population by stating that "Even in our distant state, some good rumor of their worth and civility has arrived. We have learned with joy their improvement in social arts. We have read their newspapers. We have seen some of them in our schools and colleges. In common with the great body of the American people we have witnessed with sympathy the painful labors of these red men to redeem their own race from the doom of eternal inferiority, and to borrow and domesticate in the tribe, the arts and customs of the Caucasian race." (Emerson, 1269)." In the conclusion of the letter, Emerson questions the morality of a government that could put "so vast an outrage upon the Cherokee nation, and upon human nature (Emerson, 1271)."

== Historical context ==
With Andrew Jackson's signing of the Indian Removal Act in May 1830, the Cherokee Nation first embarked on a battle with the United States government and European settlers in a fight for the right to their hunting grounds and areas of residence which spanned across the southeastern United States, primarily Georgia. As matters intensified, a small gang of Cherokees began to think it may be best to submit to a treaty before the government attacked them. Therefore, in December 1835, the Treaty of New Echota was signed, giving Cherokees two years to prepare for the removal. Emerson expresses the "eastern distaste for President Jackson's removal policies," by reiterating to Martin Van Buren,"The newspapers now inform us, that, in December 1835, a treaty contracting for the exchange of all the Cherokee territory, was pretended to be made by an agent on the part of the United States with some persons appearing on the part of the Cherokees; that the fact afterwards transpired that these deputies did by no means represent the will of the nation, and that out of eighteen thousand souls composing the (Cherokee) nation, fifteen thousand six hundred and sixty eight have protested against the so called Treaty. It now appears that the Government of the United States choose to hold the Cherokees to this sham treaty, and are proceeding to execute the same (Emerson, 1269)." Along with others, Emerson is able to see through the government's efforts to play down their act of cruelty with attempts to make it seem as if they are going about the "civilized" route in obtaining a treaty, for it is immediately apparent that the Treaty does not represent the true feelings of the Cherokee people.

== Analysis ==
Through reading Emerson's letter to Martin Van Buren, readers can discover Emerson's emotions that convey his transcendentalist attitude. At the time, transcendentalism was a growing movement that focused on pinpointing the discrepancies of society. This led to a growing desire to get involved in politics and the actions of the American government. Primary topics for those recognized with the Transcendentalist Movement included the War with Mexico, the treatment of Native Americans, and the ongoing practice of slavery. Emerson saw the Cherokee as innocent people still left untainted by the "atrocities" of society. He is trying to convince President Van Buren of their growing civility, and show support for the Cherokee tribe. However, Emerson explains in his essay, Nature, that once one is born and bred in nature, they will never forget its influence. Emerson believed that all mankind was ultimately good. Therefore, he begins to question whether he could say the same about the American government. He proclaims,"it is the chirping of grasshoppers beside the immortal question whether justice shall be done by the race of civilized, to the race of savage man; whether all the attributes of reason, of civility, of justice, and even of mercy, shall be put off by the American people, and so vast an outrage upon the Cherokee nation, and upon human nature, shall be consummated (Emerson, 1270-1271)." He questions how a nation that calls itself "civilized" is capable of sending thousands of Indians away from their native land just so the Americans can have the land for themselves. He continues, "On the broaching of this question, a general expression of despondency,-of disbelief that any good will accrue from a remonstrance on an act of fraud and robbery-appeared in those men to whom we naturally turn for aid and counsel. Will the American Government steal? Will it lie? Will it kill?-we ask triumphantly. Our wise men shake their heads dubiously (Emerson, 1271)." Emerson proposed the question as to whether or not the American government has morals and, if so, he is challenging its ethics and core values. This letter was meant to burden the conscience of Van Buren and question whether the president’s actions would represent the will of the American people. Not only was Martin Van Buren challenged to consider how his actions would affect the Cherokee Indians, he was also made aware that such an action might make the entire nation start to question the morality of the government. In the words of Emerson scholar Kenneth Sacks, "Especially important is an argument that immorality toward any member of the community is immorality toward all: 'a crime that really deprives us as well as the Cherokees of a country'".

== American support ==
Prior to Emerson’s letter to President Martin Van Buren, there was not a very positive relationship between the colonists and the Indians. In fact, it was extremely negative and relations between the two groups were very harsh. Violence and hatred was almost always present whenever the two encountered one another. It was rare for such a letter to come from the time (1838) because the idea of Manifest Destiny was very strong among Americans throughout the 19th century. Most all writings that came from that time period represented much bias and hatred towards the opposing side. Oftentimes, the Indians were pictured as barbaric and ravenous beasts and the colonists were regarded as unjust and unprovoked murderers. Emerson was one of the first respected and significant figures that decided to stand up in defense of the Cherokee tribe. In his letter, Emerson showed support for the Indians and expressed that many Americans also felt as though the Indians were being treated unfairly. Emerson was a big supporter that man was created equal, and therefore, it would be morally wrong to strip the Cherokees of their native land. He stresses the concept of both sides mutually respecting each other as a unitary group, despite the hateful relationship that has existed between them in the past. This idea would have come as almost foreign to many people at the time because there was such a push for American expansion and supremacy. However, through writing this letter, Emerson sparked support for the Cherokee people. It formed a positive link between the two groups even if it did not solve the problem. Even though the letter was not enough to prevent the government from proceeding in its aggressive expansion, it created the opportunity for Americans to stand up and support the idea of treating the Indians as equals.

== Emerson's tone ==
Ralph Waldo Emerson’s tone in his letter to Van Buren was very articulate and helped better his argument in favor of the Cherokee tribe. Emerson was a very respected and recognized writer during the time and therefore, his letter automatically held noteworthy weight when it was sent to the President. Through reading the letter, it is easy for one to see the experience Emerson had as a writer. He knew exactly how to address the President and what tone would be the most appropriate in order to have the largest impact possible. As the letter unfolds, Emerson reveals a deep respect for Martin Van Buren and his position as president; however, he remains steadfast in his defense of the Cherokee territory. Emerson directly challenges Van Buren’s honesty regarding the United States relations with the Indian people. He argues his point in a strong and thorough manner, while also upholding a sense of respect, admiration, and professionalism. By stating that, "each [citizen] may look with trust and loving anticipation to your government,"(Emerson, 1268–1271)." Emerson establishes his high regard for the President. In addition, Emerson addresses Van Buren as "Sir" at almost every opportunity. While maintaining this sense of respect throughout his entire letter, Emerson continues to push his point, consistently challenging the president to consider the Native American’s side of the matter. "Will the American Government steal? Will it lie? Will it Kill?"(Emerson, 1270–1271)." Emerson deliberately left out the terms of the treaty in order to force Van Buren to acknowledge the reality of what the American government was in the process of doing to the Cherokee people.
