= Charleston Cumberland Presbyterian Church =

Historic church in Tennessee, United States

- U.S. National Register of Historic Places
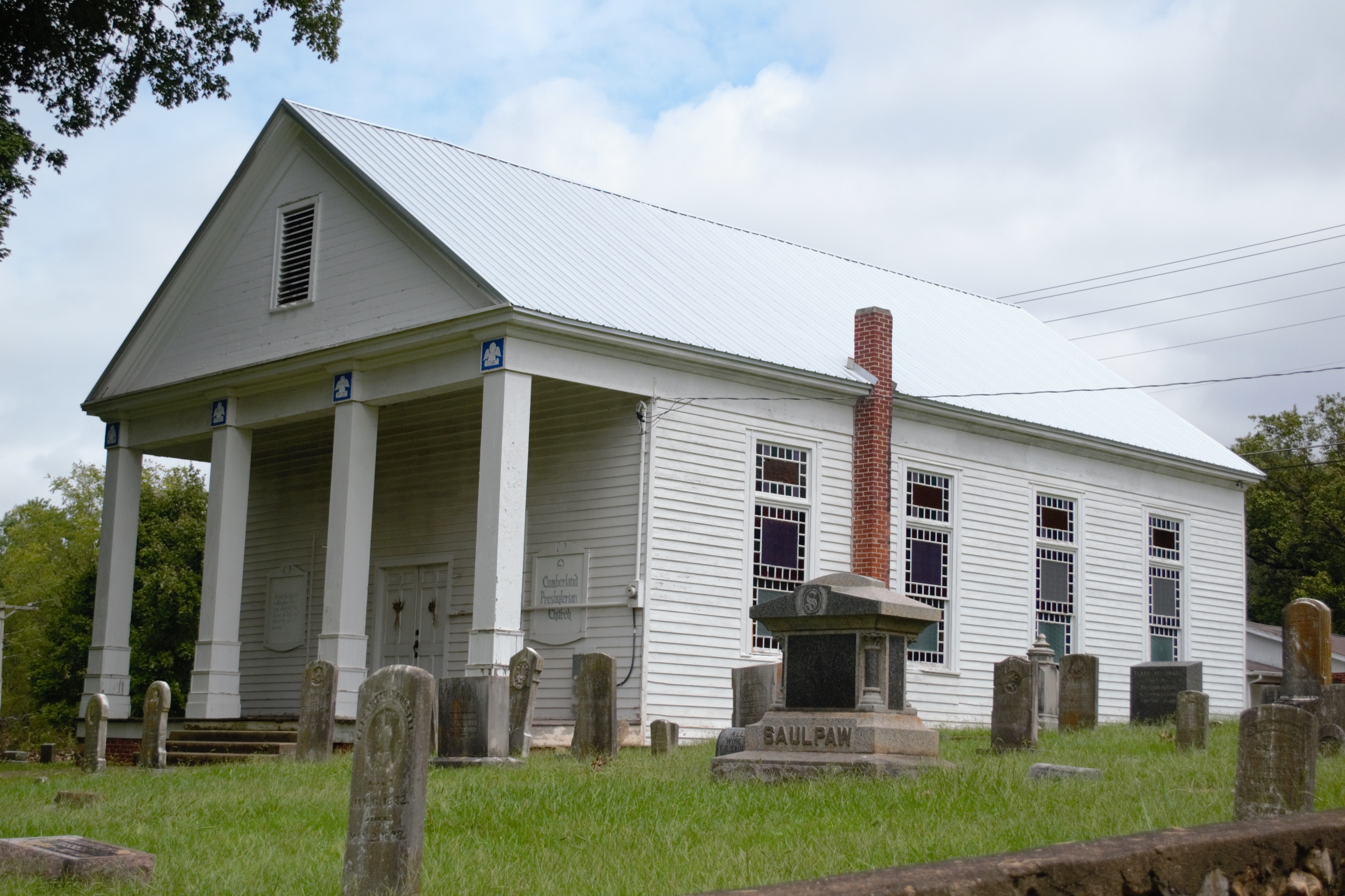

- Location within Tennessee Location within the United States
- Location: Railroad St., Charleston, Tennessee
- Coordinates: 35°17′5″N 84°45′14″W
- Area: 0.6 acres (0.24 ha)
- Built: 1860
- Architectural style: Greek Revival
- NRHP reference No.: 84003444
- Added to NRHP: July 12, 1984

Charleston Cumberland Presbyterian Church is a historic church on Railroad Street in Charleston, Tennessee.

It was built in 1860 in the Greek Revival architectural style. In 1863, during the American Civil War, Confederate forces used the building as a hospital. It was added to the National Register of Historic Places in 1984.
