= Rattlesnake Springs =

- U.S. National Register of Historic Places
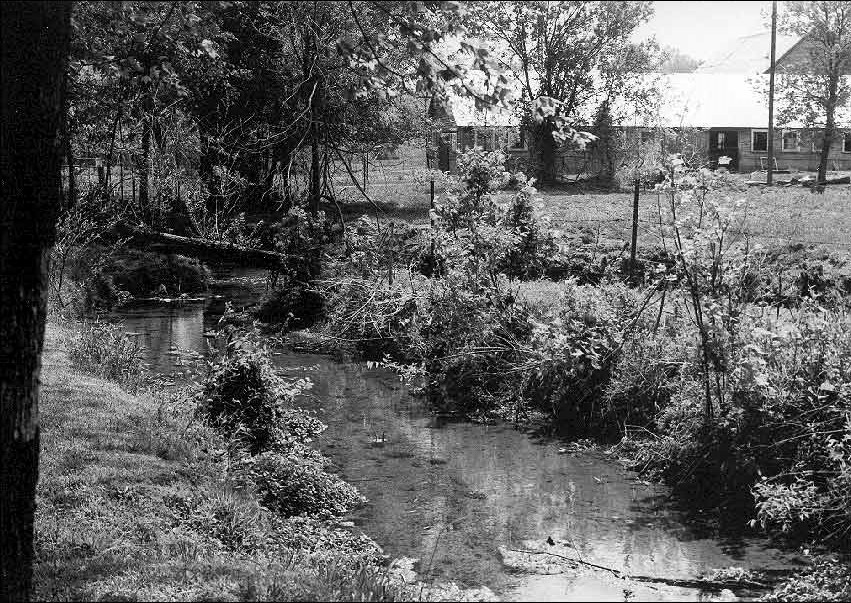

- Location within Tennessee Location within the United States
- Location: Bradley County, Tennessee, United States
- Nearest city: Cleveland, Tennessee
- Coordinates: 35°14′40″N 84°52′16″W
- NRHP reference No.: 75001734
- Added to NRHP: September 5, 1975

Rattlesnake Springs is a historic site in Bradley County, Tennessee listed on the National Register of Historic Places (NRHP) in 1975.

== History ==
Rattlesnake Springs is located northeast of Cleveland and southeast of Charleston on a privately owned dairy farm in rural Bradley County.

The site was a significant location for the eastern Cherokee Nation and during the Cherokee removal. The final Council of the eastern Cherokees was held at Rattlesnake Springs, and in 1838 federal troops held and assembled 13,000 Cherokees on the site to begin the migration to Oklahoma known as the Trail of Tears. Federal troops along with militias from Tennessee and Georgia established two military camps near the site, Camp Foster and Camp Worth, which were used to oversee the Cherokees prior to removal. These camps were two of several camps used for this purpose in the area, including Fort Cass in Charleston. More than 200 Cherokees reportedly died at the springs prior to removal due to unsanitary conditions.

The historical significance of Rattlesnake Springs was chronicled by local historian and Cleveland mayor James F. Corn in his 1959 book "Red Clay and Rattlesnake Springs: A History of the Cherokee Indians of Bradley County, Tennessee." The site was listed on the National Register of Historic Places on September 5, 1975. A historical marker once stood near the site.

== See also ==
- Red Clay State Historic Park
- Chatata
- Fort Cass
- National Register of Historic Places listings in Bradley County, Tennessee
