= Museum Center at Five Points =

Museum Center at 5ive Points
- Established: September 11, 1999
- Location: 200 Inman Street; Cleveland, Tennessee, United States
- Coordinates: 35°09′29″N 84°52′27″W
- Type: History museum, art museum, cultural center
- Director: Lauren Brown
- Curators: Madeline Greene, Adam Romano
- Website: www.museumcenter.org

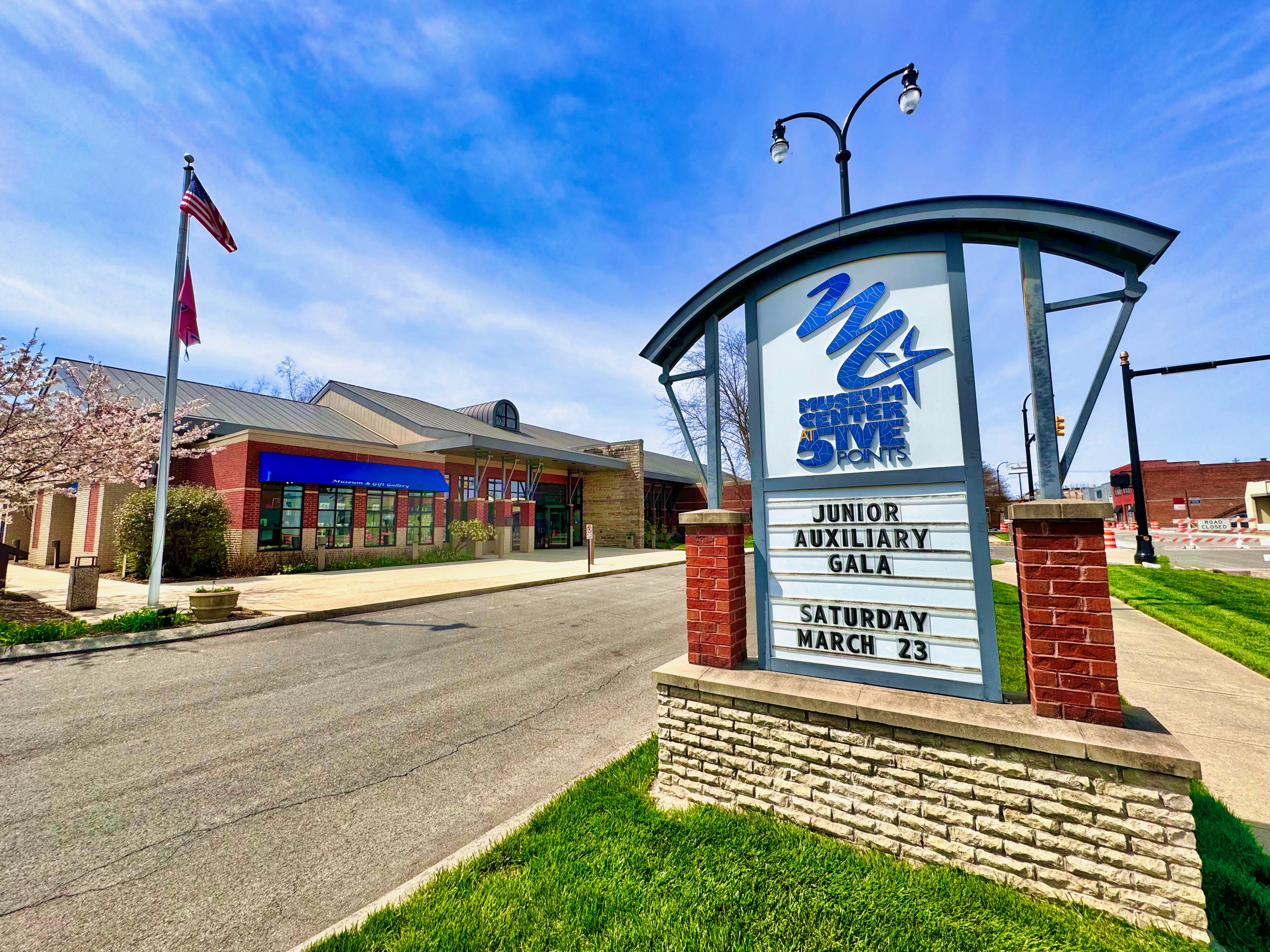
Museum Center at 5ive Points

The Museum Center at 5ive Points is a history museum in Cleveland, Tennessee which features exhibits on the history of the local region.

== Exhibits ==
The Museum Center is a history museum, art museum, and cultural center and houses exhibits and artifacts relating to the history of the Ocoee Region of Tennessee, which includes Bradley and Polk Counties and the Chattanooga region and surrounding areas. The museum features one permanent exhibit, The River of Time, which traces the history of Bradley County, Polk County, and East Hamilton County. In addition, five to six changing exhibitions are held each year. The museum contains a store which has a gallery showcasing arts and crafts of the region and of the South. The facility is often used for private and community events.

== History ==
The museum was first proposed in 1992. A committee was created on March 9, 1992 to study the feasibility of establishing a museum which would be "an organized and permanent non-profit institution, essentially educational or aesthetic in purpose, with professional staff, which owns and utilizes tangible objects, cares for them and exhibits them to the public on some regular schedule." Their mission statement was "to preserve and interpret the history and culture of the Ocoee District of Southeast Tennessee by highlighting the adventures of its people." Construction began on the museum center on May 28, 1998, and the museum opened to the public on September 11, 1999. The museum center was chosen as the 2011 recipient of the MainStreet Cleveland award. "Telling the story of the Ocoee Region" was adopted as the museum's mission statement on June 18, 2013.
