= Cherokee removal =

1838–1839 forced migration of the Cherokee people

- Part of Indian removal
- Locations: New Echota, Cherokee Nation; 34°32′22″N 84°54′31″W; Tahlequah, Cherokee Nation; 35°54′41″N 94°58′38″W
- Planned by: United States Army
- Commanded by: (United States) Major-General Winfield Scott
- Objective: Removal of the Cherokees remaining in Georgia, North Carolina, Tennessee and Alabama to the West according to the terms of the 1835 Treaty of New Echota.
- Date: Began May 25, 1838
- Executed by: (United States) Eastern Division of the Army
- Casualties: ~3,500 Cherokee dead or missing
- The map shows the locations of the Cherokee Nation capital before removal from the southeastern United States and the present day. The first national capital was located in New Echota (right). In 1839, the capital was moved to its present location in Tahlequah (left).

The Cherokee removal (May 25, 1838 – 1839), part of the Indian removal, refers to the forced displacement of an estimated 15,500 Cherokees and 1,500 African-American slaves from the U.S. states of Georgia, North Carolina, Tennessee and Alabama to the West according to the terms of the 1835 Treaty of New Echota. It is estimated that 3,500 Cherokees and African-American slaves died en route.

The Cherokee have come to call the event Nu na da ul tsun yi (the place where they cried); another term is Tlo va sa (our removal). Neither phrase was used at the time, and both seem to be of Choctaw origin. Other American Indian groups in the American South, North, Midwest, Southwest, and the Plains regions were removed, some voluntarily, some reluctantly, and some by force. The Chickasaw, Choctaw, Muscogee (Creek), and Cherokee were removed reluctantly. The Seminole in Florida resisted removal by the United States Army for decades (1817–1850) with guerrilla warfare, part of the intermittent Native American Wars that lasted from 1540 to 1924. Some Seminole remained in their Florida home country, while others were transported to Indian Territory in shackles.

The phrase "Trail of Tears" is used to refer to similar events endured by other Indian groups, especially among the "Five Civilized Tribes". The phrase originated as a description of the involuntary removal of the Choctaw in 1831.

== Origins ==
In the fall of 1835, a census was taken by civilian officials of the War Department to enumerate Cherokee residing in Alabama, Georgia, the Carolinas, and Tennessee, with a count of 16,542 Cherokee, 201 inter-married whites, and 1592 slaves (total: 18,335 people). Tensions between the indigenous Cherokee and white settlers developed over ownership of the land rich in gold deposits and fertile soil that could be used for farming cotton. In October of that year, Principal Chief John Ross and an Eastern visitor, John Howard Payne, were kidnapped from Ross's Tennessee home by a renegade group of the Georgia militia. Released, Ross and a delegation of tribal leaders traveled to Washington, DC to protest against this high-handed action, and to lobby against the removal policy of President Andrew Jackson. In an effort to reach an agreeable compromise Principal Chief John Ross met with President Jackson to discuss the possibility that Cherokee might give up some of their land for money and land to the west of the Mississippi River. Jackson turned this deal down resulting in Ross suggesting $20 million as a base for negotiating the sale of the land and eventually agreeing to let the US Senate decide the sale price.

John Ross estimated the value of Cherokee Land at $7.23 million. A conservative estimate by Matthew T. Gregg in 2009 puts Cherokee's land value for the 1838 market at $7,055,469.70, more than $2 million over the $5 million the senate agreed to pay. In this power vacuum, U.S. Agent John F. Schermerhorn gathered a group of dissident Cherokee in the home of Elias Boudinot at the tribal capital, New Echota. There on December 29, 1835, this rump group signed the unauthorized Treaty of New Echota, which exchanged Cherokee land in the East for lands west of the Mississippi River in Indian Territory. This agreement was never accepted by the elected tribal leadership or a majority of the Cherokee people. In February 1836, two councils convened at Red Clay, Tennessee and at Valley Town, North Carolina (now Murphy, North Carolina) and produced two lists totaling some 13,000 names written in the Sequoyah writing script of Cherokee opposed to the Treaty. The lists were dispatched to Washington, DC and presented by Chief Ross to Congress. Nevertheless, a slightly modified version of the Treaty was ratified by the U.S. Senate by a single vote on May 23, 1836, and signed into law by President Jackson. The Treaty provided a grace period until May 1838 for the tribe to voluntarily remove themselves to Indian Territory.

=== Growth in cotton farming and agriculture ===
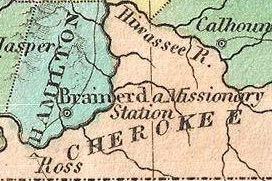
Detail of an 1827 map depicting a substantial part of southeastern Tennessee and northwestern Georgia as a confined territory assigned to the lower Creek and Cherokee nations.

Until widespread use of the cotton gin, short-staple cotton had been such an arduous crop to grow and process because of the time-consuming process of removing the sticky seeds from each of the individual bolls of cotton. This process took so long that it was nearly unprofitable to grow cotton. The increased ease of cotton production due to access to the Cotton Gin, invented in 1793 by Eli Whitney, which used teeth to comb through the fluffy fibers and remove all of the seeds in a much more efficient manner, led to a major rise in the production of cotton in the south near North Carolina, Tennessee and Georgia. Production increased from 750,000 bales in 1830 to 2.85 million bales in 1850, earning the south the nickname King Cotton for its success. Matthew T. Gregg writes that "According to the 1835 Cherokee census enumerators, 1,707,900 acres in the Cherokee Nation in Georgia were tillable." This land was valuable farming land, with the ideal climate and the necessary 200 frost-free days for growing cotton, and would have been crucial in supporting the cotton industry's monumental growth, as would have increased ease of transportation due to railroads. The Cherokee Indians typically grew small family farms and only planted what was needed to survive alongside hunting and gathering. Some, however, heeded Silas Dinsmoor's advice. They took advantage of the growing demand for cotton and began to farm it themselves, asking for cotton cards, cotton gins, and spinning wheels from the United States Government. As immigration increased rapidly throughout the 1820s and 1830s, and by 1850 approximately 2.6 million people immigrated to the United States, the government saw that the land could be used for more than just small family crops and could provide a source of income for the farmers immigrating to the south and needing farmable land. The Cherokees that did farm cotton in excess for selling became a threat to the settlers that were hoping to capitalize on the cotton industry by taking away not only valuable farm land but also adding more cotton to the market which could reduce the demand and the price, thus prompting the pursuit of a removal treaty.

=== Georgia and the Cherokee Nation ===
The rapidly expanding population of the United States early in the 19th century created tensions with Native American tribes located within the borders of the various states. While state governments did not want independent Indian enclaves within state boundaries, Indian tribes did not want to relocate or to give up their distinct identities.

With the Compact of 1802, the state of Georgia relinquished to the national government its western land claims (which became the states of Alabama and Mississippi). In exchange, the national government promised to eventually conduct treaties to relocate those Indian tribes living within Georgia, thus giving Georgia control of all land within its borders.

However, the Cherokee, whose ancestral tribal lands overlapped the boundaries of Georgia, Tennessee, North Carolina, and Alabama, declined to move. They established a capital in 1825 at New Echota near present-day Calhoun, Georgia. Furthermore, led by principal Chief John Ross and Major Ridge, the speaker of the Cherokee National Council, the Cherokee adopted a written constitution on July 26, 1827, declaring the Cherokee Nation to be a sovereign and independent nation.

With this constitution, an election was held for Principal Chief. John Ross won the first election and became the leader and representative of the tribe. In 1828, the Cherokee government established a law that addressed the issue of removal. The law stated that the signing of an agreement with the United States that addressed Cherokee land without consent of the Cherokee government would be considered treasonous and could be punishable by death.

The Cherokee land that was lost proved to be extremely valuable. Upon these lands were the alignments for the future rights-of-way for rail and road communications between the eastern Piedmont slopes of the Appalachian Mountains, the Ohio River in Kentucky and the Tennessee River Valley at Chattanooga. This location is still a strategic economic asset and is the basis for the tremendous success of Atlanta, Georgia, as a regional transportation and logistics center. Georgia's appropriation of these lands from the Cherokee kept the wealth out of the hands of the Cherokee Nation.

The Cherokee lands in Georgia were settled upon by the Cherokee for the simple reason that they were and still are the shortest and most easily traversed route between the only fresh water sourced settlement location at the southeastern tip of the Appalachian range (the Chattahoochee River), and the natural passes, ridges, and valleys which lead to the Tennessee River at what is today, Chattanooga. From Chattanooga there was and is the potential for a year-round water transport to St. Louis and the west (via the Ohio and Mississippi rivers), or to as far east as Pittsburgh, Pennsylvania.

These tensions between Georgia and the Cherokee Nation were brought to a crisis by the discovery of gold near Dahlonega, Georgia, in 1828, resulting in the Georgia Gold Rush, the second gold rush in U.S. history. Hopeful gold speculators began trespassing on Cherokee lands, and pressure began to mount on the Georgia government to fulfill the promises of the Compact of 1802.

In the early 1830s the state of Georgia aggressively moved to eliminate Cherokee political authority declaring its sovereignty over the Nation's territory as a deliberate legal strategy to seize valuable gold rich land. This political move was immediately followed by a statute that declared it unlawful for anyone acting “under pretext of authority from the Cherokee tribe” to call “for the purpose of making laws, orders, or regulations” which intern criminalized Cherokee governance. By declaring Cherokee political authority illegitimate, the state began to clear legal obstacles for white settlers and people who could profit from mineral exploitation. Lastly, the same legislation empowered Georgia to control residency in the gold region by ejecting whites unless they swore an oath to uphold the state constitution.

This campaign of removal was proposed by Governor George Gilmer, a fervent and powerful advocate for Georgia's sovereignty over the Cherokee territory. His strong opinion on state sovereignty, led him to view Cherokee resistance as an obstacle to Georgia’s expansion during the gold rush. As Governor Gilmer acknowledged the situation, he made it impossible to rely on civil functions alone, since “the sheer scope of the intrusion made that desire unrealistic.” With legislative support, his administration turned toward coercive enforcement embracing laws that “relied upon force first and civil authority second.” These developments provided both the justification and the legal foundation for the creation of a state controlled paramilitary force.

To enforce Georgia's will in Cherokee territory, Gilmer established a sixty man paramilitary unit known as the Georgia Guard. According to Adam J. Pratt, the Guard headquartered itself at an abandoned barracks formerly occupied by the Fourth U.S. Infantry. They “rechristened the barracks Camp Gilmer” and began to enforce state law throughout Cherokee territory. The Guard’s mission was to impose Georgia law throughout Cherokee lands, signaling an important shift away from federal oversight toward state controlled enforcement. Its early responsibilities were “protecting the gold mines,” which required confronting white intruders and “intimidating Cherokees” who lived near the mining district. Its authority quickly expanded with bystanders noting that its operations “made it the central actor not only in the latest Supreme Court cases but also in the next gubernatorial election.” These developments signaled a major change away from federal oversight towards a state run paramilitary enforcement within Cherokee territory.

Beyond regulating the mines, the Georgia Guard enforced state authority through intimidation and the disruption of Cherokee daily life. Guard units routinely appeared in Cherokee towns as part of a “concerted effort… to exert Georgia’s power over the region and its inhabitants.” They often targeted religious and community spaces. For example, at the Baptist station at Tensewatee members of the Guard “claimed to be possessed by the spirits,” attempted to “trample the small congregation,” and “mocked the baptismal sacrament.” Other patrols entered villages armed “with muskets, pistols, swords, and all the implements of warfare.” These displays of force were intended not only to assert legal authority but also to destabilize Cherokee social and cultural life with implied violence.

The Georgia Guard also played a very big role in directly destabilizing Cherokee political structures. By arresting members of the Cherokee National Committee, the Guard made “coordinated efforts… difficult because of the Guard’s aggressive efforts to arrest the council.” Not only that, but Cherokee political leaders also issued direct warnings intended to stop the Cherokee from resisting as that could worsen The Guards involvement. Many Cherokees were hoping the federal government would stop Georgia from violating their sovereignty, but that that would not be the case. One of the Guards warned that if federal troops intervened, the Cherokee Nation “would be swept off the Earth before any assistance could arrive,” adding that many Georgians needed only “a small pretext to exterminate them.” These actions weakened Cherokee political organization and would lead toward removal.

While political disagreements eventually led Georgia to formally disband the Georgia Guard the use of force did not end there. Georgia's move was not a retreat from military enforcement but in fact an escalation to a larger more organized army. Heightened anxiety among white settlers in the late 1830s prompted calls for greater military protection with residents insisting that “the time has arrived when it is indispensable to the safety of the people and property.” Many threatened to flee with their families unless more troops were deployed. They described the Cherokees resistance as “bold, saucy, and stubborn.” In response, state and federal authorities planned a larger gathering of armed men, sending “two thousand armed Georgians… into the very heart of the Cherokee Nation.” Officials claimed these forces were meant “to give security to our citizens; to overawe the revengeful spirit of the lawless portion of the Indians… to protect your families, neighborhoods, and the people of each county.” This finalized the use of state intimidation and directly paved the way for the forced removal of the Cherokee from their own land.

When Georgia moved to extend state laws over Cherokee tribal lands in 1830, the matter went to the U.S. Supreme Court. In Cherokee Nation v. Georgia (1831), the Marshall court ruled that the Cherokee were not a sovereign and independent nation, and therefore refused to hear the case. However, in Worcester v. State of Georgia (1832), the Court ruled that Georgia could not impose laws in Cherokee territory, since only the national government – not state governments – had authority in Indian affairs.

President Andrew Jackson has often been quoted as defying the Supreme Court with the words, "John Marshall has made his decision; now let him enforce it!" Jackson probably never said this, but he was fully committed to the policy. He had no desire to use the power of the national government to protect the Cherokee from Georgia, since he was already entangled with states' rights issues in what became known as the nullification crisis. With the Indian Removal Act of 1830, the U.S. Congress had given Jackson authority to negotiate removal treaties, exchanging Indian land in the East for land west of the Mississippi River. Jackson used the dispute with Georgia to put pressure on the Cherokee to sign a removal treaty.

Due to laws passed by the State of Georgia encroaching on Cherokee lands, the Cherokee Nation moved their capitol to the Red Clay Council Grounds a few hundred yards north of the state line in present-day Bradley County, Tennessee.

=== Treaty of New Echota ===
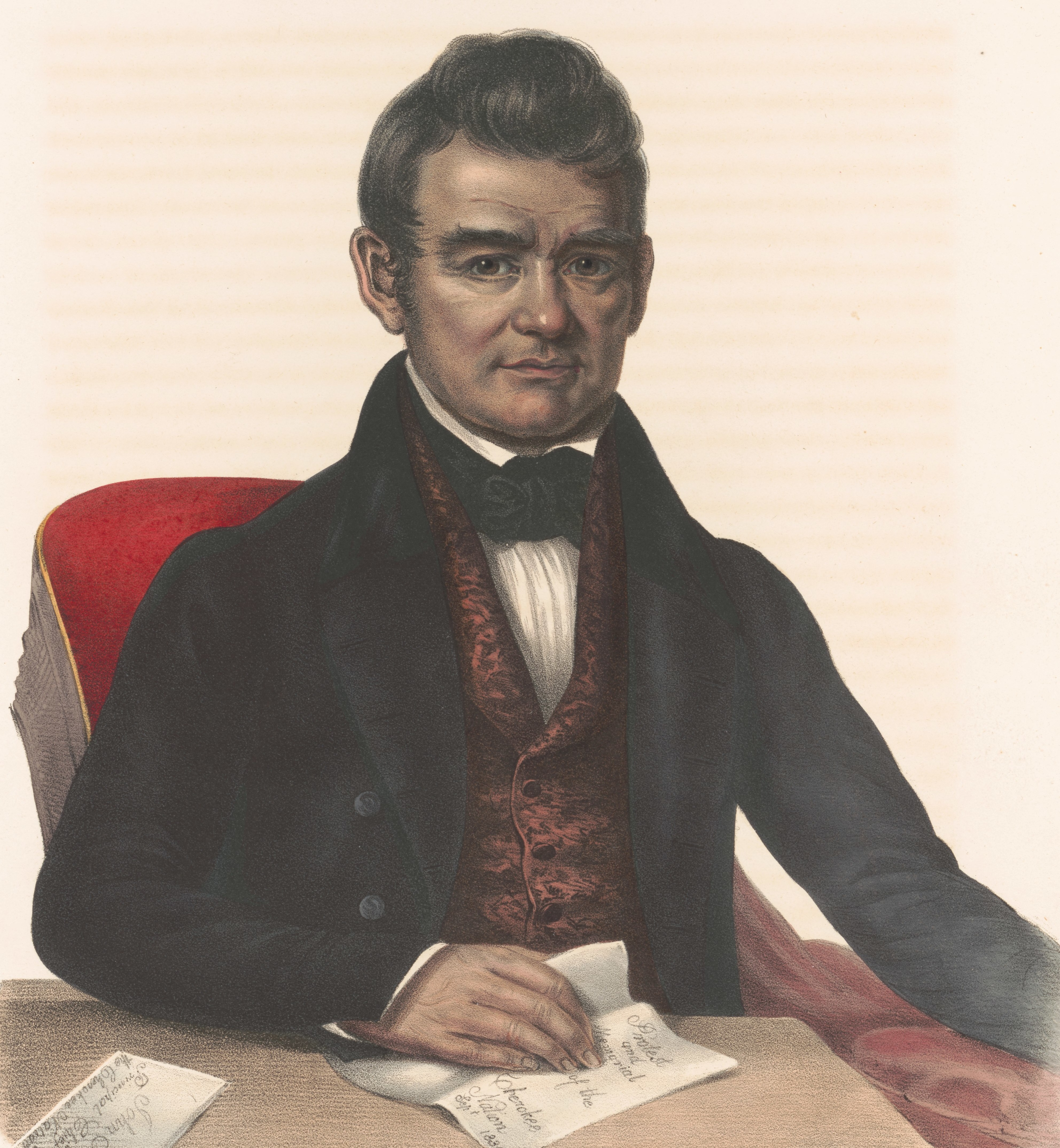
Chief John Ross, opponent of the Treaty of New Echota

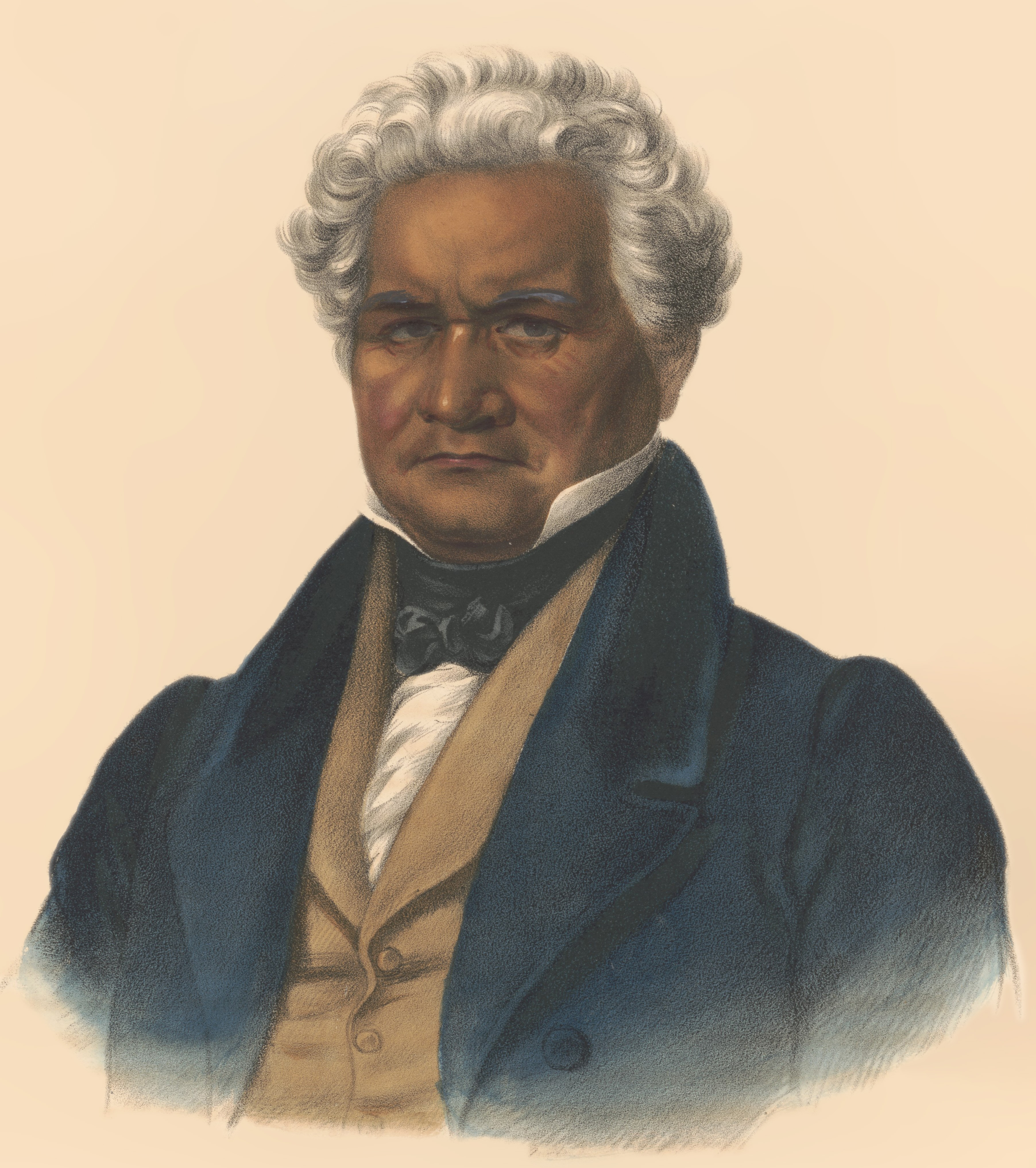
Major Ridge, of the "Treaty Party". Illustration from History of the Indian Tribes of North America.

With the landslide reelection of Andrew Jackson in 1832, some of the most strident Cherokee opponents of removal began to rethink their positions. Led by Major Ridge, his son John Ridge, and nephews Elias Boudinot and Stand Watie, they became known as the "Ridge Party", or the "Treaty Party". This party believed that it was in the best interest of the Cherokee to get favorable terms from the U.S. government, before white squatters, state governments, and violence made matters worse. John Ridge began unauthorized talks with the Jackson administration in the late 1820s. Meanwhile, in anticipation of the Cherokee removal, the state of Georgia began holding lotteries in order to divide up the Cherokee tribal lands among white Georgians.

However, Principal Chief John Ross and the majority of the Cherokee people remained adamantly opposed to removal. Chief Ross canceled the tribal elections in 1832, the Council threatened to impeach the Ridges, and a prominent member of the Treaty Party, John "Jack" Walker, Jr., was murdered. The Ridges responded by eventually forming their own council, representing only a fraction of the Cherokee people. This split the Cherokee Nation into two factions: those following Ross, known as the National Party, and those of the Treaty Party, who elected William A. Hicks, who had briefly succeeded his brother Charles R. Hicks as Principal Chief of the Cherokee Nation to act as titular leader of the pro-Treaty faction, with former National Council clerk Alexander McCoy as his assistant.

John states in his letter to congress, "By the stipulations of this instrument, we are despoiled of our private possessions, the indefeasible property of individuals. We are stripped of every attribute of freedom and eligibility for legal self-defence. Our property may be plundered before our eyes; violence may be committed on our persons; even our lives may be taken away, and there is none to regard our complaints. We are denationalized; we are disfranchised. We are deprived of membership in the human family! We have neither land nor home, nor resting place that can be called our own. And this is effected by the provisions of a compact which assumes the venerated, the sacred appellation of treaty. We are overwhelmed! Our hearts are sickened, our utterance is paralyzed, when we reflect on the condition in which we are placed, by the audacious practices of unprincipled men, who have managed their stratagems with so much dexterity as to impose on the Government of the United States, in the face of our earnest, solemn, and reiterated protestations."

In 1835, Jackson appointed Reverend John F. Schermerhorn as one of the commissioners for the Treaty. The U.S. government proposed to pay the Cherokee Nation US$4.5 million (among other considerations) to remove themselves. These terms were rejected in October 1835 by the Cherokee Nation Council meeting at Red Clay. Chief Ross, attempting to bridge the gap between his administration and the Treaty Party, traveled to Washington with a party that included John Ridge and Stand Watie to open new negotiations, but they were turned away and told to deal with Schermerhorn.

Meanwhile, Schermerhorn organized a meeting with the pro-removal council members at New Echota. oklahoma Only five hundred Cherokee out of thousands responded to the summons, and, on December 30, 1835, twenty-one proponents of Cherokee removal, Major Ridge, Elias Boudinot, James Foster, Testaesky, Charles Moore, George Chambers, Tahyeske, Archilla Smith, Andrew Ross (younger brother of Chief John Ross), William Lassley, Caetehee, Tegaheske, Robert Rogers, John Gunter, John A. Bell, Charles Foreman, William Rogers, George W. Adair, James Starr, and Jesse Halfbreed, signed or left "X" marks on the Treaty of New Echota after those present voted unanimously for its approval. John Ridge and Stand Watie signed the Treaty when it was brought to Washington. Chief Ross, as expected, refused.

This Treaty, which was not approved by National Council, gave up all the Cherokee land east of the Mississippi River in return for five million dollars to be disbursed on a per capita basis, an additional half-million dollars for educational funds, title in perpetuity to an amount of land in Indian Territory equal to that given up, and full compensation for all property left in the East. There was also a clause in the treaty as signed allowing Cherokee who so desired to remain and become citizens of the states in which they resided on 160 acres (0.65 km^{2}) of land, but that was later stricken out by President Jackson.

Despite the protests by the Cherokee National Council and principal Chief Ross that the document was a fraud, Congress ratified the Treaty on May 23, 1836 by one vote.

== Removal process ==
The process of Cherokee removal took place in three stages. It began with the voluntary removal of those in favor of the Treaty, who were willing to accept government support and move west on their own in the two years after the signing of the Treaty of New Echota in 1835. Most of the Cherokee, including Chief John Ross, were outraged and unwilling to move, and they reacted with opposition. They did not believe the government would take any action against them if they elected to stay. However, the U.S. Army was sent in, and the forcible removal stage began. The Cherokee were herded violently into internment camps, where they were kept for the summer of 1838. The actual transportation west was delayed by intense heat and drought, but in the fall, the Cherokee reluctantly agreed to transport themselves west under the supervision of Chief Ross in the reluctant removal stage.

=== Voluntary removal ===
The Treaty provided a two-year grace period for Cherokee to willingly emigrate to Indian Territory. However, President Andrew Jackson dispatched General John E. Wool to begin the process of rounding up all those who would accept government provisions and prepare them for removal. Upon arrival, the staunch opposition to the Treaty was evident to General Wool as the provisions were rejected by nearly all that he came in contact with, and it seemed that no one would voluntarily remove themselves. Due to the staunch opposition, preparations did not begin for several months, which greatly frustrated General Wool, who reported that the Indians were "almost universally opposed to the Treaty." During this time, efforts were also being made by pro-removal advocates within the Cherokee to persuade the rest of the people to accept government subsistence and therefore give in to the inevitable. The Treaty Party called a meeting of the Cherokee on September 12, 1836 to do just that, but the meeting was canceled due to John Ross's subsequent call for another meeting that opposed the goals of the first in every way. Ross urged the people to continue to reject any government handout, stressing that the acceptance of any such gift also meant the acceptance of the Treaty terms. Seeing that all efforts to sway their brethren were fruitless, a number of Cherokee (mostly members of the Ridge faction) ceased their delay and accepted government funds for subsistence and transportation. An approximate total of 2,000 Cherokee voluntarily removed themselves to the west, leaving around 13,000 of their brethren behind, who continued their opposition. Many travelled as individuals or families, but there were several organized groups:

1. John S. Young, Conductor; via river boats; 466 Cherokee and 6 Creek, left March 1, 1837; arrived March 28, 1837; included Major Ridge and Stand Watie.
2. B.B. Cannon, Conductor; overland; 355 persons (15 deaths); left Oct.15, 1837; arrived Dec.29, 1837; included James Starr.
3. Rev. John Huss, Conductor, overland; 74 persons; left Nov.11, 1837; arrival unknown.
4. Robert B. Vann, leader; 133 persons; left Dec.1, 1837; arrived March 17, 1838.
5. Lt. Edward Deas, Conductor; by boat; 252 persons (2 deaths); left April 6, 1838; arrived May 1, 1838.
6. 162 persons; left May 25, 1838; arrived Oct. 21, 1838.
7. 96 persons; date left unknown; arrived June 1, 1838.
8. Lt. Edward Deas and John Adair Bell, Co-Conductors, overland, 660 persons left Oct. 11, 1838; 650 arrived Jan. 7, 1839.

There are muster rolls for groups # 1, 3 – 6 and daily journals of conductors for groups # 2 and 5 among records of the Bureau of Indian Affairs in the National Archives. Despite the government blandishments, only a few hundred volunteered to accept terms for removal of the Treaty.

=== Forcible removal ===
Many Americans were outraged by the dubious legality of the Treaty and called on the government not to force the Cherokee to move. For example, on April 23, 1838, Ralph Waldo Emerson wrote a letter to Jackson's successor, President Martin Van Buren, urging him not to inflict "so vast an outrage upon the Cherokee Nation."

Nevertheless, as the May 23, 1838, deadline for voluntary removal approached, President Van Buren assigned General Winfield Scott to head the forcible removal operation. He established military operational headquarters at Fort Cass in Charleston, Tennessee at the site of the Indian Agency, and arrived at New Echota on May 17, 1838, in command of U.S. Army and state militia totaling about 7,000 soldiers. Scott discouraged mistreatment of the Native Americans, ordering his troops to "show every possible kindness to the Cherokee and to arrest any soldier who inflicted a wanton injury or insult on any Cherokee man, woman, or child." They began rounding up Cherokee in Georgia on May 26, 1838; ten days later, operations began in Tennessee, North Carolina, and Alabama. Men, women, and children were removed at gunpoint from their homes over three weeks and gathered together in concentration camps, often with very few of their possessions. About 1,000 Cherokee took refuge in the mountains to the east, and some who owned private property also escaped the evacuation. The Cherokee were then marched overland to departure points at Ross's Landing (Chattanooga) and Gunter's Landing (Guntersville, Alabama) on the Tennessee River, and forced on to flatboats and the steamers "Smelter" and "Little Rock". Unfortunately, a drought brought low water levels on the rivers, requiring frequent unloading of vessels to evade river obstacles and shoals. The Army directed removal was characterized by many deaths and desertions, and this part of the Cherokee removal proved to be a fiasco and Gen. Scott ordered suspension of further removal efforts. The Army-operated groups were:

1. Lt. Edward Deas, Conductor; 800 left June 6, 1838 by boat; 489 arrived June 19, 1838.
2. Lt. Monroe, Conductor, 164 persons left June 12, 1838; arrival unknown.
3. Lt. R.H.K. Whiteley, ca. 800 persons left June 13, 1838 by boat, arrived Aug. 5, 1838 (70 deaths).
4. Captain Gustavus S. Drane, Conductor, 1072 left June 17, 1838 by boat, 635 arrived Sept. 7, 1838 (146 deaths, 2 births).

Muster rolls for groups # 1 and 4 are in the records of the Bureau of Indian Affairs and # 2 in records of the Army Continental Commands (Eastern Division, Gen. Winfield Scott's papers) in the National Archives. There are daily journals of conductors for groups # 1 and 3 among Special Files of the Bureau of Indian Affairs.

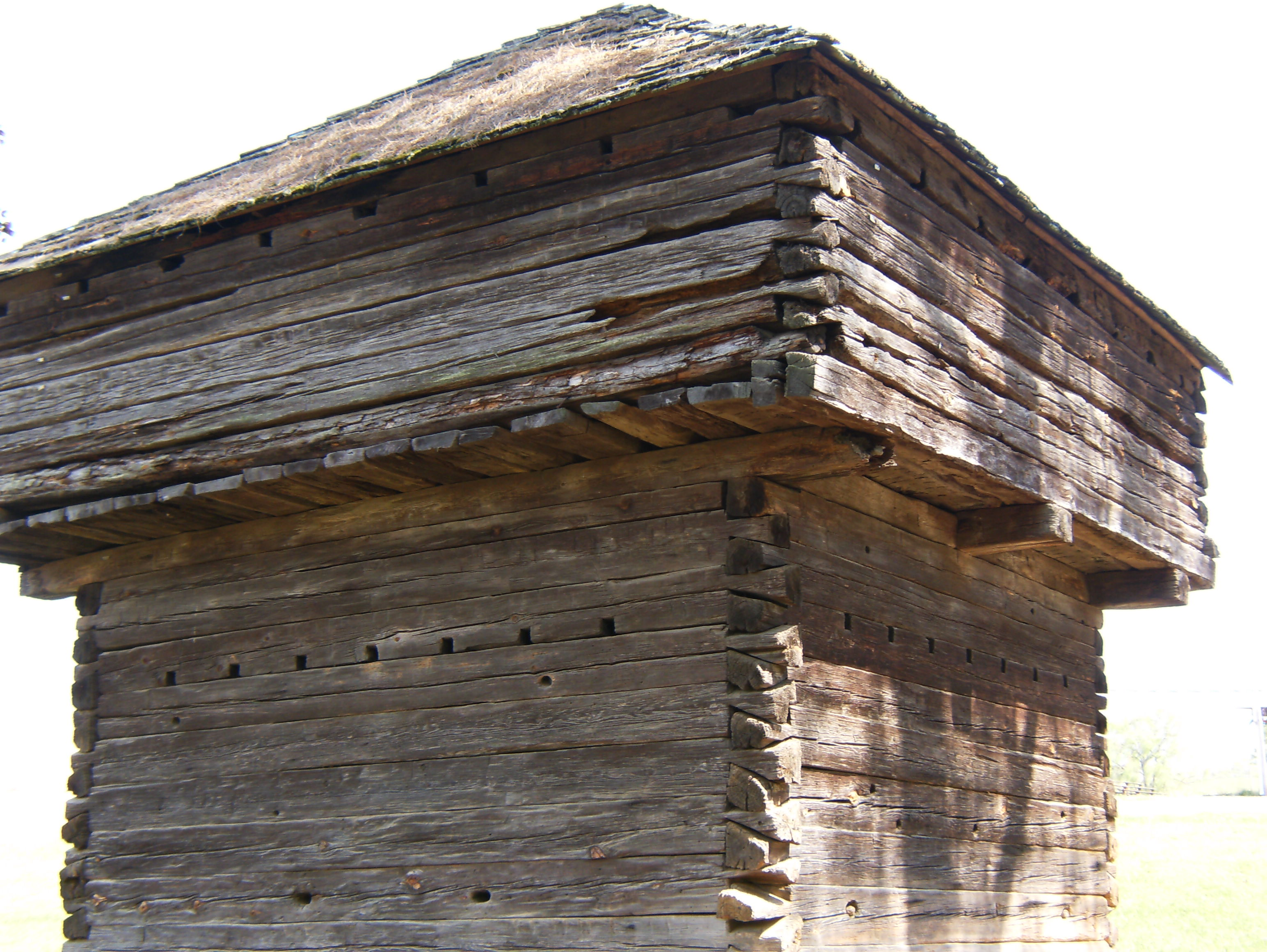
Fort Marr Blockhouse in Benton, Tennessee, is the last surviving remnant of the forts used to intern the Cherokee in preparation for their removal to Indian Territory.

The deaths and desertions in the Army's boat detachments caused Gen Scott to suspend the Army's removal efforts, and the remaining Cherokee were put into eleven internment camps, located at Fort Cass, Ross's Landing in present-day Chattanooga, Red Clay, Bedwell Springs, Chatata, Mouse Creek, Rattlesnake Springs, Chestoee, and Calhoun, and one camp near Fort Payne in Alabama. From the camps, the Cherokee were then relocated to three emigration depots, which were located at Fort Cass, Ross's Landing, and Gunter's Landing near Guntersville, Alabama.

Cherokee remained in the camps during the summer of 1838 and were plagued by dysentery and other illnesses, which led to 353 deaths. A group of Cherokee petitioned General Scott for a delay until cooler weather made the journey less hazardous. This was granted; meanwhile Chief Ross, finally accepting defeat, managed to have the remainder of the removal turned over to the supervision of the Cherokee Council. Although there were some objections within the U.S. government because of the additional cost, General Scott awarded a contract for removing the remaining 11,000 Cherokee under the supervision of Principal Chief Ross, with expenses to be paid by the Army, which outraged President Van Buren and surprised many.

=== Reluctant removal ===
Chief John Ross made sure to confirm and secure his position as leader of the removal process by conferring with other Cherokee leaders, who granted him full responsibility of this daunting task. He then wasted no time in forming a plan, in which he organized 12 wagon trains, each with about 1,000 persons and conducted by veteran full-blood tribal leaders or educated mixed bloods. Each wagon train was assigned physicians, interpreters (to help the physicians), commissaries, managers, wagon masters, teamsters, and even grave diggers. Chief Ross also purchased the steamboat Victoria in which his own and tribal leaders' families could travel in some comfort. Lewis Ross, the Chief's brother, was the main contractor and furnished forage, rations, and clothing for the wagon trains. Although this arrangement was an improvement for all concerned, disease and exposure still took many lives.

These detachments were forced to trek through various trails, crossing through Kentucky, Illinois, Tennessee, Mississippi, Arkansas, and Missouri to the final destination of Oklahoma. One of the main routes began in Chattanooga, TN and took a northwestern route through eastern Kentucky and southern Illinois before bearing to the southwest near the center of Missouri. The entire trip was roughly 2,200 miles. The Cherokee endured freezing temperatures, snowstorms, and pneumonia. The harshness of the trail and the intense weather conditions claimed around 4,000 lives, although estimates vary.

1. Daniel Colston, Conductor (first choice Hair Conrad became ill); Asst. Conductor Jefferson Nevins; 710 persons left Oct.5, 1838 from Agency camp and 654 people arrived at Woodall's place in Indian Territory on Jan. 4, 1839 (57 deaths, 9 births, 24 deserters).
2. Elijah Hicks, Conductor; White Path (died near Hopkinsville, Kentucky) and William Arnold, Asst. Conductors; 809 persons left Oct.4, 1838 from Camp Ross on Gunstocker Creek and 744 people arrived Jan.4, 1839 at Mrs. Webber's place in Indian Territory.
3. Rev. Jesse Bushyhead, Conductor; Roman Nose, Asst. Conductor; 864 left Oct. 16, 1838 from Chatata Creek camp and 898 arrived Feb. 27, 1839 at Fort Wayne, Ind. Ty. (38 deaths, 6 births, 151 deserters, 171 additions).
4. Capt. John Benge, Conductor; George C. Lowrey, Jr. Asst. Conductor; 1,079 persons left Fort Payne camp, Alabama Oct. 1, 1838 and 1,132 arrived Jan.11, 1839 at Mrs. Webber's place, Indian Territory. (33 deaths, 3 births).
5. Situake, Conductor; Rev. Evan Jones, Asst. Conductor; 1,205 persons left Oct. 19, 1838 from Savannah Creek camp and 1,033 arrived Feb. 2, 1839 (at Beatties' Prairie, Indian Territory. (71 deaths, 5 births).
6. Capt. Old Fields, Conductor; Rev. Stephen Foreman, Asst. Conductor; 864 persons left Oct. 10, 1838 from Candy's Creek camp and 898 arrived Feb. 2, 1839 at Beatties' Prairie (57 deaths, 19 births, 10 deserters, 6 additions).
7. Moses Daniel, Conductor; George Still, Sr. Asst. Conductor; 1,031 persons left from Agency camp on Oct.23, 1838 and 924 arrived March 2, 1839 at Mrs. Webber's (48 deaths, 6 births).
8. Chuwaluka (a.k.a. Bark), Conductor; James D. Wofford (fired for drunkenness) and Thomas N. Clark, Jr. Asst. Conductors; 1,120 left Oct.27, 1838 from Mouse Creek camp and 970 arrived March 1, 1839 at Fort Wayne.
9. Judge James Brown, Conductor; Lewis Hildebrand, Asst. Conductor; 745 left Oct. 31, 1838 from Ootewah Creek camp and 717 arrived March 3, 1839 at Park Hill.
10. George Hicks, Conductor; Collins McDonald, Asst. Conductor; 1,031 left Nov. 4, 1838 from Mouse Creek camp and 1,039 arrived March 14, 1839 near Fort Wayne.
11. Richard Taylor, Conductor; Walter Scott Adair, Asst. Conductor; 897 left Nov. 6, 1838 from Ooltewah Creek camp and 942 arrived March 24, 1839 at Woodall's place(55 deaths, 15 births). Missionary Rev. Daniel Butrick accompanied this detachment, and his daily journal has been published.
12. Peter Hildebrand, Conductor; James Vann Hildebrand, Asst. Conductor; 1,449 left Nov. 8, 1838 Ocoe camp and 1,311 arrived March 25, 1839 near Woodall's place.
13. Victoria Detachment – John Drew Conductor; John Golden Ross, Asst. Conductor; 219 left Nov. 5, 1838 Agency camp and 231 arrived March 18, 1839 Tahlequah.

There exist muster rolls for four (Benge, Chuwaluka, G. Hicks, and Hildebrand) of the 12 wagon trains and payrolls of officials for all 13 detachments among the personal papers of Principal Chief John Ross in the Gilcrease Institution in Tulsa, OK.

== Casualties ==
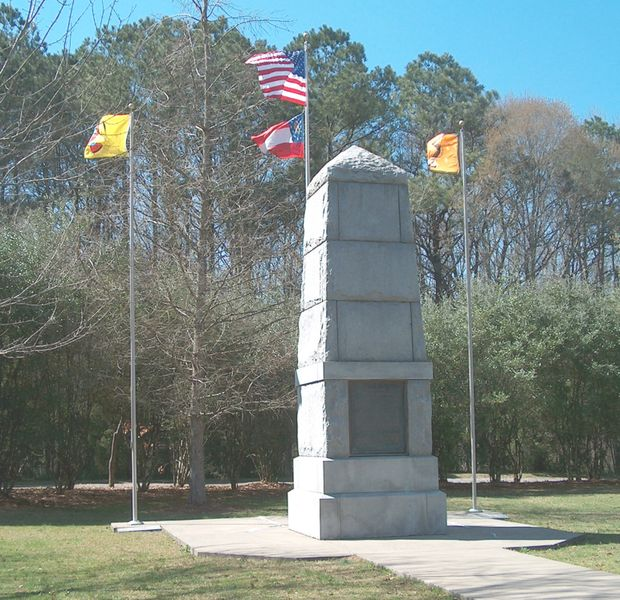
This monument at the New Echota Historic Site honors Cherokees who died on the Trail of Tears.

The number of people who died as a result of the Trail of Tears has been variously estimated. American doctor and missionary Elizur Butler, who made the journey with the Daniel Colston wagon train, estimated 2,000 deaths in the Army removal and internment camps and perhaps another 2,000 on the trail; his total of 4,000 deaths remains the most cited figure, although he acknowledged these were estimates without having seen government or tribal records. A scholarly demographic study in 1973 estimated 2,000 total deaths; another, in 1984, concluded that a total of 6,000 people died. The 4000 figure or one quarter of the tribe was also used by the Smithsonian anthropologist James Mooney. Since 16,000 Cherokee were enumerated on the 1835 Census, and about 12,000 emigrated in 1838, ergo 4000 needed accounting for. Some 1500 Cherokee remained in North Carolina, many more in South Carolina, and Georgia, so the higher fatality numbers are unlikely. In addition, nearly 400 Muscogee (Creek) Indians who had avoided being removed earlier fled into the Cherokee Nation and became part of the latter's removal.

An accounting of the exact number of fatalities during the removal is also related to discrepancies in expense accounts submitted by Chief John Ross after the removal that the Army considered inflated and possibly fraudulent. Ross claimed rations for 1600 more Cherokee than were counted by an Army officer, Captain Page, at Ross's Landing as Cherokee groups left their homeland and another Army officer, Captain Stephenson, at Fort Gibson counted them as they arrived in Indian Territory. Ross's accounts are consistently higher numbers than that of the Army disbursing agents. The Van Buren administration refused to pay Ross, but the later Tyler administration eventually approved disbursing more than $500,000 (~$15.6 million in 2024) to the Principal Chief in 1842.

In addition, some Cherokee traveled from east to west more than once. Many deserters from the Army's boat detachments in June 1838 later emigrated in the twelve Ross wagon trains. There were transfers between groups, and later join ups and desertions were not always recorded. Jesse Mayfield was a white man with a Cherokee family went twice (first voluntarily in B.B. Cannon's detachment in 1837 to Indian Territory; unhappy there, he returned to the Cherokee Nation; and in Oct. 1838 was Wagon Master for the Bushyhead Detachment). An Army disbursing agent discovered that a Cherokee named Justis Fields travelled with government funds three times under different aliases. A mixed-blood named James Bigby, Jr. travelled to Indian Territory five times (three as government interpreter for different detachments, as Commissary for the Colston detachment, and as an individual in 1840). In addition, a small but significant number of mixed-bloods and whites with Cherokee families petitioned to become citizens of Alabama, Georgia, North Carolina, South Carolina, or Tennessee and thus ceased to be considered Cherokee.

During the journey, it is said that the people would sing "Amazing Grace", using its inspiration to improve morale. The traditional Christian hymn had previously been translated into Cherokee by the missionary Samuel Worcester with Cherokee assistance. The song has since become a sort of anthem for the Cherokee people.

== Aftermath ==
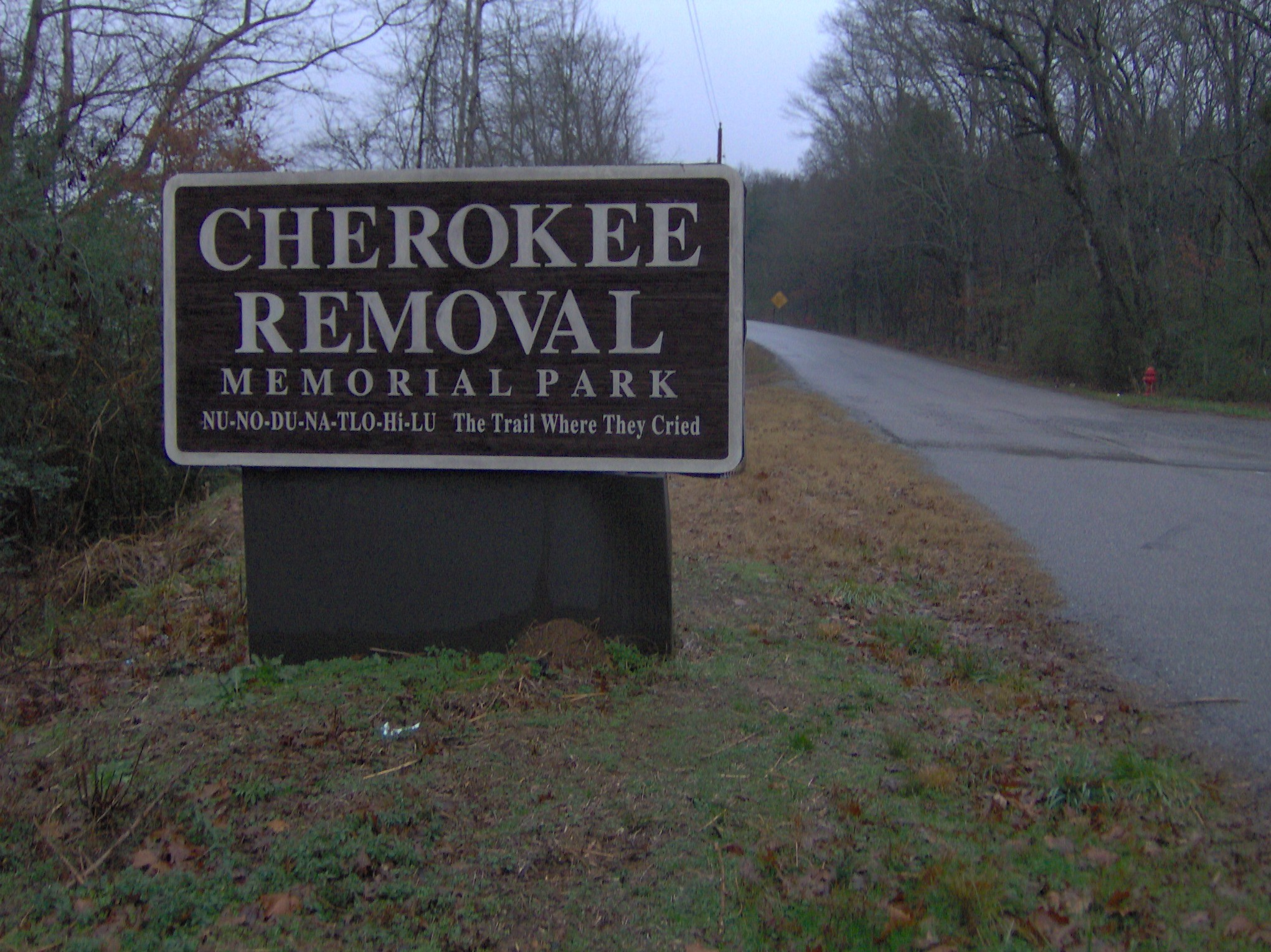
The entrance to the Cherokee Removal Memorial Park near Blythe's Ferry, one of the trail's departure points

Cherokee who were removed initially settled near Tahlequah, Oklahoma. The political turmoil resulting from the Treaty of New Echota and the Trail of Tears led to the assassinations of Major Ridge, John Ridge, and Elias Boudinot; of those targeted for assassination that day, only Stand Watie escaped his assassins. The population of the Cherokee Nation eventually rebounded, and today the Cherokee are the largest American Indian group in the United States.

There were some exceptions to removal. Those Cherokee who lived on private, individually owned lands (rather than communally owned tribal land) were not subject to removal. In North Carolina, about 400 Cherokee led by Yonaguska lived on land along the Oconaluftee River in the Great Smoky Mountains owned by a white man named William Holland Thomas (who had been adopted by Cherokee as a boy), and were thus not subject to removal, and these were joined by a smaller band of about 150 along the Nantahala River led by Utsala. Along with a group living in Snowbird and another along the Cheoah River in a community called Tomotley, these North Carolina Cherokee became the Eastern Band of the Cherokee Nation, numbering approximately 1000. According to a roll taken the year after the removal (1839), there were in addition some estimated about 400 of Georgia, South Carolina, Tennessee, and Alabama, and these also joined the EBCI.

A local newspaper, the Highland Messenger, said July 24, 1840, “that between nine hundred and a thousand of these deluded beings … are still hovering about the homes of their fathers, in the counties of Macon and Cherokee" and "that they are a great annoyance to the citizens" who wanted to buy land there believing the Cherokee were gone; the newspaper reported that President Jackson said "they … are, in his opinion, free to go or stay.’

The Trail of Tears is generally considered to be an infamous episode in American history. To commemorate the event, the U.S. Congress designated the Trail of Tears National Historic Trail in 1987. It stretches across nine states for 2,200 miles (3,500 km).

In 2004, during the 108th Congress, Senator Sam Brownback (Republican of Kansas) introduced a joint resolution (Senate Joint Resolution 37) to "offer an apology to all Native Peoples on behalf of the United States" for past "ill-conceived policies" by the United States Government regarding Indian Tribes. It passed in the U.S. Senate in February 2008.

As of 2014, Cherokee Nation members can request heritage seeds for a species of beans carried on the Trail of Tears from the Cherokee Seed Project.

== In popular culture ==
- The group Paul Revere & the Raiders issued a single in the early 1970s which commemorated the forcible removal of the Cherokee Nation: "Indian Reservation (The Lament of the Cherokee Reservation Indian)".
- Country-rock super-group Southern Pacific recorded a song titled "Trail of Tears" on their 1988 Zuma album.
- In 1974 John and Terry Talbot Mason Proffit wrote and recorded their song "Trail of Tears" on the album The Talbot Brothers.
- Swedish rock band Europe refers to the Trail of Tears in their song "Cherokee" on their album The Final Countdown.
- Popular US composer James Barnes published a tone poem for wind band entitled Trail of Tears (1989) that depicts the journey made by the Cherokee people. The piece includes the recitation of a mournful poem in the Cherokee language: Dedeeshkawnk juniyohoosa, Dedeeshkawnk ahyoheest, Dedeeshkawnk daynahnohtee (Let us mourn those who have died, Let us mourn those who are dying, Let us mourn those who must endure).
- Guitarist Eric Johnson released a song entitled "Trail of Tears" on his 1986 album Tones.
- A Parchment of Leaves, a novel by Silas House, uses the Cherokee removal as a major plot-point.
- The novel Through the Trail of Tears by Gloria V. Casañas has these events as a major theme in the story, told through excerpts of a fictional diary.
