= Fort Cass =

Historic fort in Tennessee, US

- Cherokee Agency, Tennessee (present-day Charleston, Tennessee)

Location
- Location in Tennessee
- Coordinates: 35°17′11.8″N 84°45′18.0″W

Site history
- Built by: U.S. Army
- In use: January 1, 1835 – December 12, 1838

Fort Cass, named for U.S. Secretary of War Lewis Cass (1782–1866), was a fort located on the site of the U.S. federal agency to the Cherokee Nation (present-day Charleston, Tennessee). Established in 1835, the fort served as the U.S. Army headquarters for Cherokee removal (also known as the Trail of Tears) from their ancestral homelands in the Southeast to Indian Territory (present-day Oklahoma). It housed a garrison of U.S. troops who watched over the largest concentration of internment camps where Cherokee were kept during the summer of 1838 before starting the main trek west to Indian Territory, and served as one of three emigration depots where the Cherokee began their journey west, the others of which were located at Ross's Landing in Chattanooga and Gunter's Landing near Guntersville, Alabama. The fort was abandoned in 1838.

== History ==
The Cherokee population had been spread over a region that included southeast Tennessee, southwest North Carolina, northern Georgia, and northeast Alabama. The first stage of the removal process was to gather the Cherokee into several encampments, the largest of which was Fort Cass. Nearby camps stretched for many miles through the valley south of Fort Cass toward present-day Cleveland, Tennessee, including two of which were located at Rattlesnake Springs. Other camps were located at Ross's Landing in Chattanooga and Fort Payne, Alabama. Fort Butler in Murphy, North Carolina served as the military headquarters in North Carolina.

Before the removal began, from about 1819 to 1838, Fort Cass was the site of the U.S. federal agency to the Cherokee Nation, known simply as the "Cherokee Agency", a kind of embassy. The Cherokee had ceded lands north of the Hiwassee River in 1819, at which time an earlier federal agency was moved to the future site of Fort Cass and Charleston, on the south bank of the Hiwassee River in Cherokee territory. This Cherokee Agency was situated on the east side of present-day U.S. Route 11. No trace remains today.

The Indian Removal Act of 1830 began the process that culminated in the Trail of Tears eight to nine years later. In preparation for the removal of the Cherokee, Company F of the 4th U.S. Infantry arrived at the Cherokee Agency on September 1, 1834, and established Camp Cass. It was named for the United States Secretary of War, Lewis Cass. The fort was intended, in part, to intimidate the Cherokee into agreeing to move west. At first, the army utilized existing structures, including the home of Lewis Ross, brother of Chief John Ross. Beginning in 1836, a number of structures were constructed in anticipation of removal operations, including storehouses, cribs, stables, offices, and an armory. On November 6, 1836, the acting quartermaster was ordered to erect an armory surrounded by a 12 feet (3.7 m) fortification at the site.

Even after leaders signed the 1835 Treaty of New Echota with the United States, it was clear that most of the Cherokee would not willingly leave their lands. In 1838, Brigadier General Winfield Scott assumed command of the "Army of the Cherokee Nation", headquartered at Fort Cass. He notified the Cherokee people to prepare and submit to forced deportation.

Military operations began in the spring of 1838 in Georgia, North Carolina, Tennessee, and Alabama. By July 25, 1838, more than 4,800 Cherokee prisoners were encamped near Fort Cass, along nearby Mouse Creek, Chatata Creek, Chestuee Creek, Rattlesnake Springs, and Bedwell Springs. The Army initially planned to move the Cherokee from Fort Cass and to travel by boats on the Tennessee River, but low water levels due to drought made this plan unfeasible. An overland march seemed inevitable, but was delayed because it would cause great hardship if conducted during the hot and dry summer months. The exodus was postponed until September. Therefore, thousands of Cherokee spent several months living in the internment camps near Fort Cass.

Various infectious diseases swept through Fort Cass during the summer of 1838, such as whooping cough and dysentery. There were frequently several deaths per day. These diseases weakened the survivors before they ever began their overland journey. Between the end of August and early December 1838, the Cherokee from Fort Cass and other depots were organized into twelve groups and began the march west. The last Cherokee left Fort Cass on December 5, 1838.

Today nothing remains of Fort Cass or the internment camps. The historic Henegar House, built in 1849, is located on the site of part of the fort.

== See also ==
- List of forts in Tennessee
