= List of United States post office murals in Tennessee =

Following is a list of United States post office murals created in Tennessee between 1934 and 1943.

Location	Mural title	Image	Artist	Date	Notes	NRHPlisted
Bolivar	Picking Cotton		Carl Nyquist	1941	oil on canvas	
Camden	Mail Delivery to Tranquility- the First Post Office in Benton County		John Fyfe	1938	oil on canvas	
Joel W. Solomon Federal Building and United States Courthouse, Chattanooga	Allegory of Chattanooga		Hilton Leech	1937	oil on canvas	
Clarksville	Arrival of Col. John Donaldson		F. Luis Mora	1938	oil on canvas; destroyed	
Clarksville	Abundance of Today		F. Luis Mora	1938	oil on canvas; destroyed	
Clinton	Farm and Factory		Horace Day	1940	tempera; move to the new post office building in 1989.	
Columbia	Maury County Landscape		Henry Billings	1940	oil on canvas	
Crossville	The Partnership of Man and Nature		Marion Greenwood	1940	oil on canvas	
Dayton	View from Johnson's Bluff		Bertram Hartman	1939	oil on canvas	
Dickson	People of the Soil		Edwin Boyd Johnson	1939	fresco	
Dresden	Retrospection		Minetta Good	1938	oil on canvas	
Gleason	Gleason Agriculture		Anne Poor	1942	oil on canvas; one of the final murals painted in Tennessee for the Treasury Section of Fine Arts	
Jefferson City	Great Smokies and Tennessee Farms		Charles Child	1941	oil on canvas	
Johnson City	Farmer Family		Wendell Jones	1940	Mural is missing	
La Follette	On the Shores of the Lake		Dahlov Ipcar	1939	oil on canvas	
Lenoir City	Electrification		David Stone Martin	1940	oil on canvas; winner of the 48-State Mural Competition	
Lewisburg	Coming 'Round the Mountain		John H.R. Pickett	1938	oil on canvas	
Lexington	Progress of Power		Grace Greenwood (Ames)	1940	oil on canvas	
Livingston	The Newcomers		Margaret Covey Chisholm	1940	oil on canvas	
McKenzie	Early US Post Village		Karl Oberteuffer	1938	oil on canvas	
Manchester	Horse Swapping Day		Minna Citron	1942	oil on canvas	
Mount Pleasant	Early Settlers Entering Mount Pleasant		Eugene Higgins	1942	oil on canvas	
Newport	TVA Power		Minna Citron	1940	oil on canvas, two panels; now at DAR Museum	
Ripley	Autumn		Marguerite Zorach	1940	oil on canvas	
Sweetwater	Wild Boar Hunt		Thelma Martin	1942	egg tempera	
