= List of artists from Brooklyn =

This is a list of notable fine artists and designers from Brooklyn, the most populous borough of New York City, New York. It includes people who were born or raised in, lived in, or spent significant portions of their lives in Brooklyn, or for whom Brooklyn is a significant part of their identity. This list is in order by primary field of notability, and then in alphabetical order by last name. For musicians and entertainers, see list of people from Brooklyn.

== Architects ==
- Louis Allmendinger (1878–1937), architect
- Solon Spencer Beman (1853–1914), architect active in Chicago, and native to Brooklyn
- Walter B. Chambers (1866–1945), architect active in New York City, and native to Brooklyn

== Fashion ==
- Kenneth Cole (born 1954) fashion designer, businessman, his company is Kenneth Cole Productions with various fashion lines. He is native to Brooklyn.
- Bill Kaiserman (1942–2020) fashion designer, and a four-time Coty Award-winning designer; native to Brooklyn.
- Anne Klein (1923–1974), fashion designer, businesswoman, her company was Anne Klein & Company.

== Painters ==
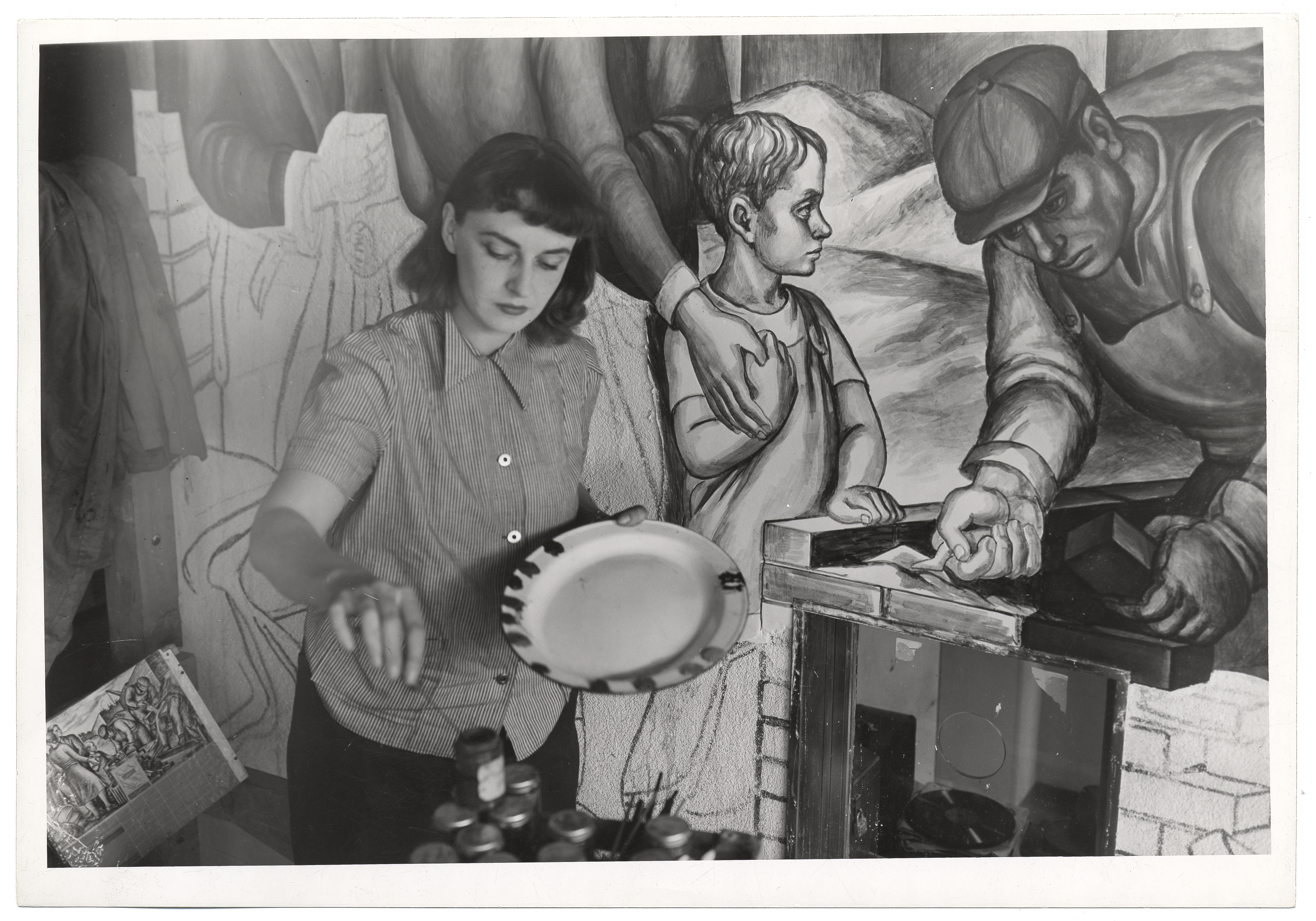
Marion Greenwood dipping her brush into her palette while painting a mural for the WPA Federal Art Project, 1940

- Ruth Abrams (1912–1986), New York School painter who was born in Brooklyn. After her death, a critic from The New York Times remarked that she was "a woman unfairly neglected in a macho era." Her papers are held at the Yeshiva University Museum and the Smithsonian Archives of American Art.
- Golnar Adili (born 1976), multidisciplinary visual artist known for her artist books, drawings and printmaking
- Fred Bendheim (born 1956), contemporary artist living and working in Brooklyn since 1984.
- Alexander Brook (1898–1980), painter and critic who was born in Brooklyn. During his twenties, Brooks painted still lifes and posed figures with vigor and sensuality. He later began to emulate the style of Jules Pascin. From 1924 to 1927 he was the assistant director of Whitney Studio Club. His realist painting was exhibited widely and he won multiple awards. Georgia Jungle won the Carnegie Prize at the Carnegie International art exhibition. Unfortunately for Brook, the realist style fell out of favor late in the 1940s.
- Aya Brown (born 1995), painter and mixed media artist, she was born in and lives in Brooklyn
- Marion Greenwood (1909–1970), painter and engraver, who had lived in Brooklyn.
- Breuk Iversen (born 1964), lived in Williamsburg, Brooklyn and is the founding member of the art collaborative known as "Offalists", using common refuse as a medium.
- Nell Choate Jones (1879–1981), artist who had lived in Brooklyn Jones was awarded an honorary doctorate by the State University of New York in 1972 and received the Distinguished Citizen Award from the Brooklyn Museum of Art in 1979. She exhibited regularly across North America in the 1940s and 1950s as well as overseas in France, Holland, Belgium, Switzerland, Greece, and Japan. Her work can be found in many museums, including the High Museum of Art in Atlanta, Georgia and the Morris Museum of Art in Augusta, Georgia.
- Tim Okamura (born 1968), painter based in Brooklyn. Okamura is known for his depiction of African-American and minority subjects in urban settings, and his combination of graffiti and realism. His work has been featured in several major motion pictures and in London's National Portrait Gallery. He was also one of several artists to be shortlisted in 2006 for a proposed portrait of Queen Elizabeth of England.
- Michael Anthony Pegues (born 1962), artist and designer, born and raised in Brooklyn.
- David Salle (born 1952), painter and leading contemporary figurative artist, Salle helped define postmodern sensibility. His paintings and prints comprise what appear to be randomly juxtaposed images, or images placed on top of one other with deliberately ham-fisted techniques.
- Walter Satterlee (1844–1908) figure and genre painter who was born in Brooklyn. He was a member of the American Water Color Society and of the New York Etching Club, and was an excellent teacher. Satterlee died in Brooklyn in 1908.
- Susan Sills, drawings and portraits.
- Danny Simmons (born 1953) abstract-expressionist painter who was a Brooklyn resident in 2009. Simmons is the co-founder and Chairman of Rush Philanthropic Arts Foundation (since 1995), which provides disadvantaged urban youth with arts access and education. Simmons also founded Rush Arts Gallery and soon thereafter converted part of his loft in Brooklyn into the Corridor Gallery. Both galleries provide exhibition opportunities to early and mid-career artists who do not have commercial representation through galleries or private dealers.
- Andrea Zittel (born 1965) installation artist who has lived in Brooklyn. Zittel produced her first "Living Unit"—an experimental structure intended to reduce everything necessary for living into a simple, compact system—as a means of facilitating basic activities within her 200-square-foot (19 m^{2}) Brooklyn storefront apartment.

== Photographers and video artists ==
- Gregory Crewdson (born 1962), photographer
- Mel Finkelstein, photographer
- Stephen Shames (born 1947) photographer
- Ka-Man Tse (born 1981), photographer, video artist, and educator

== See also ==
- List of people from Brooklyn
- Lists of artists by nationality
