= Abelardo L. Rodríguez Market =

Public market in Mexico City

Coordinates: 19°26′13.68″N 99°7′40.02″W

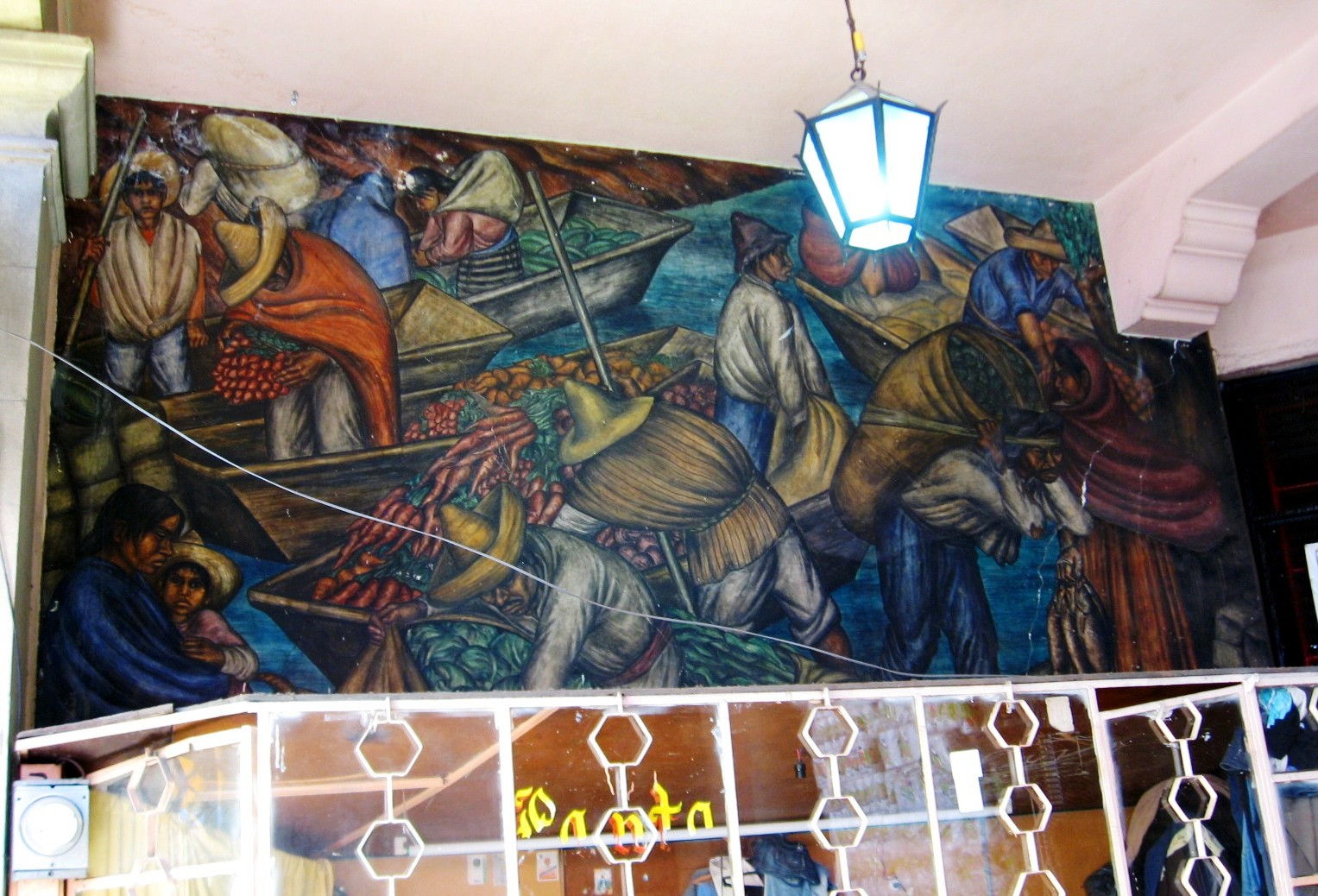
Los alimentos y su distribución sobre el canal de la Viga (1935), by Marion Greenwood, at one of the market's entrances.

The Abelardo L. Rodriguez Market is a traditional public market located in the historic center of Mexico City, northeast of the main plaza, or Zocalo. It was built in 1934 as a prototype for a more modern marketplace and has a number of unusual features such as day care and an auditorium. However, the market's most distinctive feature is the approximately 1,450 square metres of wall and ceiling space covered in murals. These murals were painted by muralists, some former Diego Rivera helpers. Rivera had a role in approving artist designs, but little else. The works mostly reflect socialist themes, such as the exploitation of workers, peasants and miners, the fight against Nazism and fascism, and racial discrimination. Earthquakes, time, humidity and vandalism took their toll on the murals from the time they were painted until restoration began in January 2009. Restoration work is expected to take almost two years.

== Construction ==
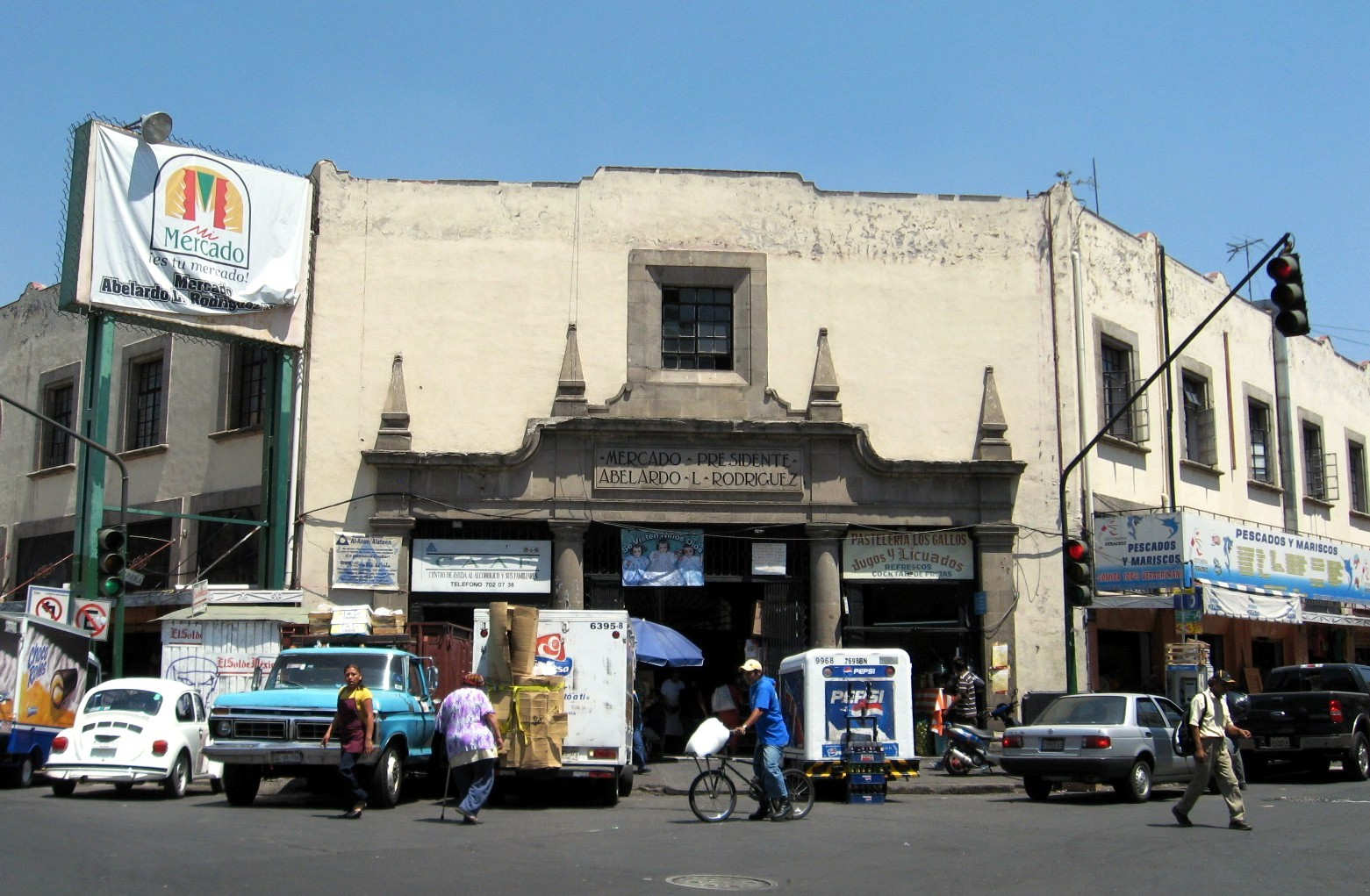
One of the four main entrances

The market was constructed in 1934 in what was part of the grounds of the San Pedro y San Pablo College. The architect was Antonio Muñoz, who mixed Baroque, Belle Époque, Art Nouveau and Art Deco elements into the building. The market has an area of 12,450 square metres and is the main market for foodstuffs in this part of the city. Upon completion, it was named after the president of Mexico who ordered the complex built. Eventually, the area around this market became known as “Abelardo.”

== Features ==
This market was the second major market built in Mexico City in the first decades of the 20th century, after the Dos de Abril Market built in 1912. Like its predecessor, the Abelard L. Rodriguez market was intended to be a prototype for a new, more modern popular marketplace, first for the large size of the market and second for a number of extra services offered within the building, such as day care centers, youth centers and libraries.

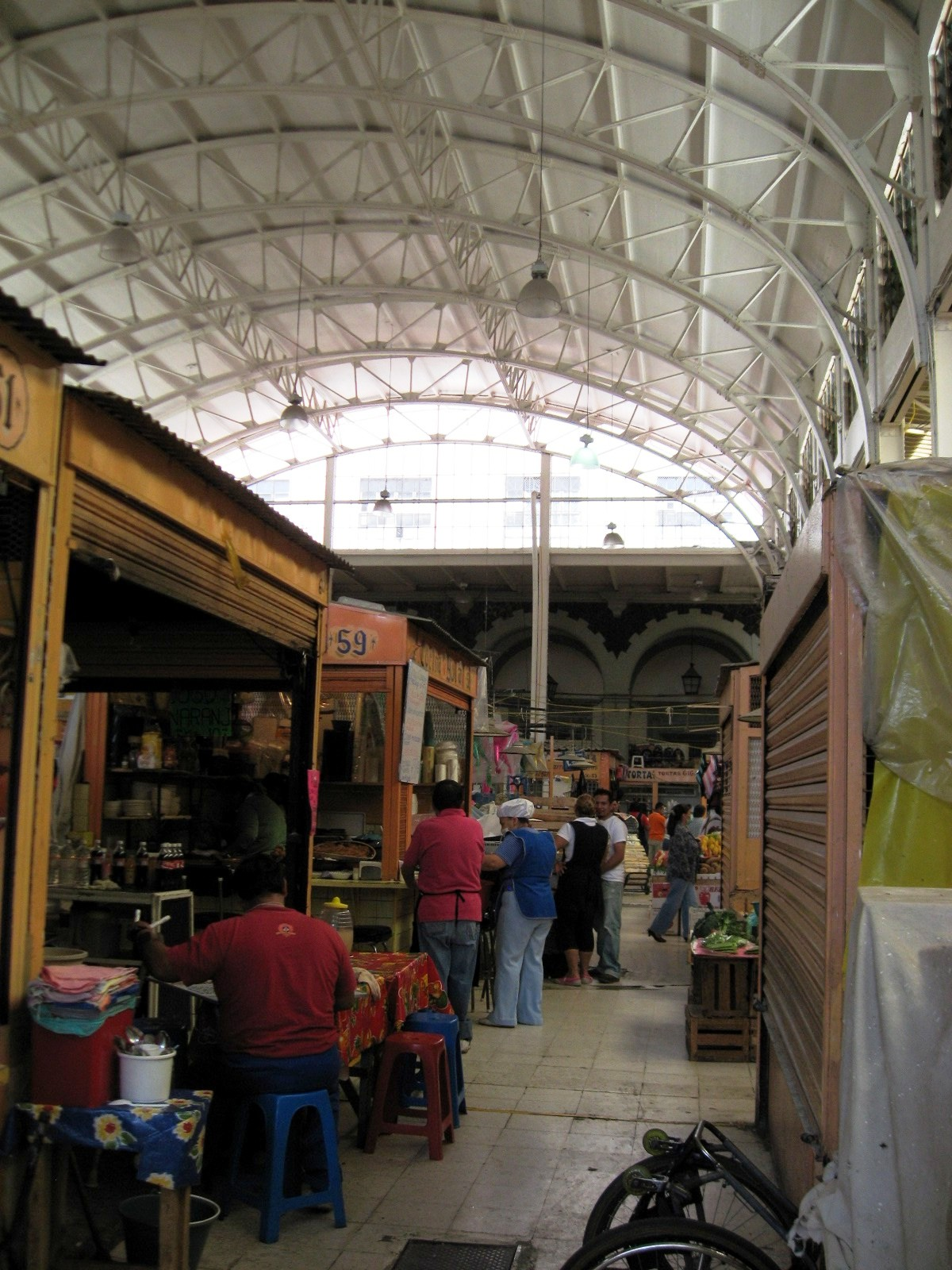
Food vendors at the market with the metal roof visible

The Abelardo L. Rodriguez market has four large entrances on República de Venezuela, República de Colombia, Del Carmen and Rodríguez Puebla streets respectively. One unusual feature of the building is the metal roof that covers the central patio area. Its most distinctive service is the Teatro del Pueblo (Theatre of the Town) auditorium, which is located on the upper floor. A number of the services and features of this market were copied in markets built as much as twenty years later, such as the markets of La Lagunilla, Tepito and La Merced.

== Murals ==
However, the market's most distinctive feature is the approximately 1,450 square meters of wall and ceiling space covering in murals. These murals were painted by students of Diego Rivera and under his direction. Six of the ten painters involved with the project were Mexican, three were American and one was Japanese, working to “bring art to the people” and paid 13.50 pesos (3.75 U.S. dollars approximately) for each square meter painted. The murals are located in the main entrances, vestibules, patios and hallways of the market.

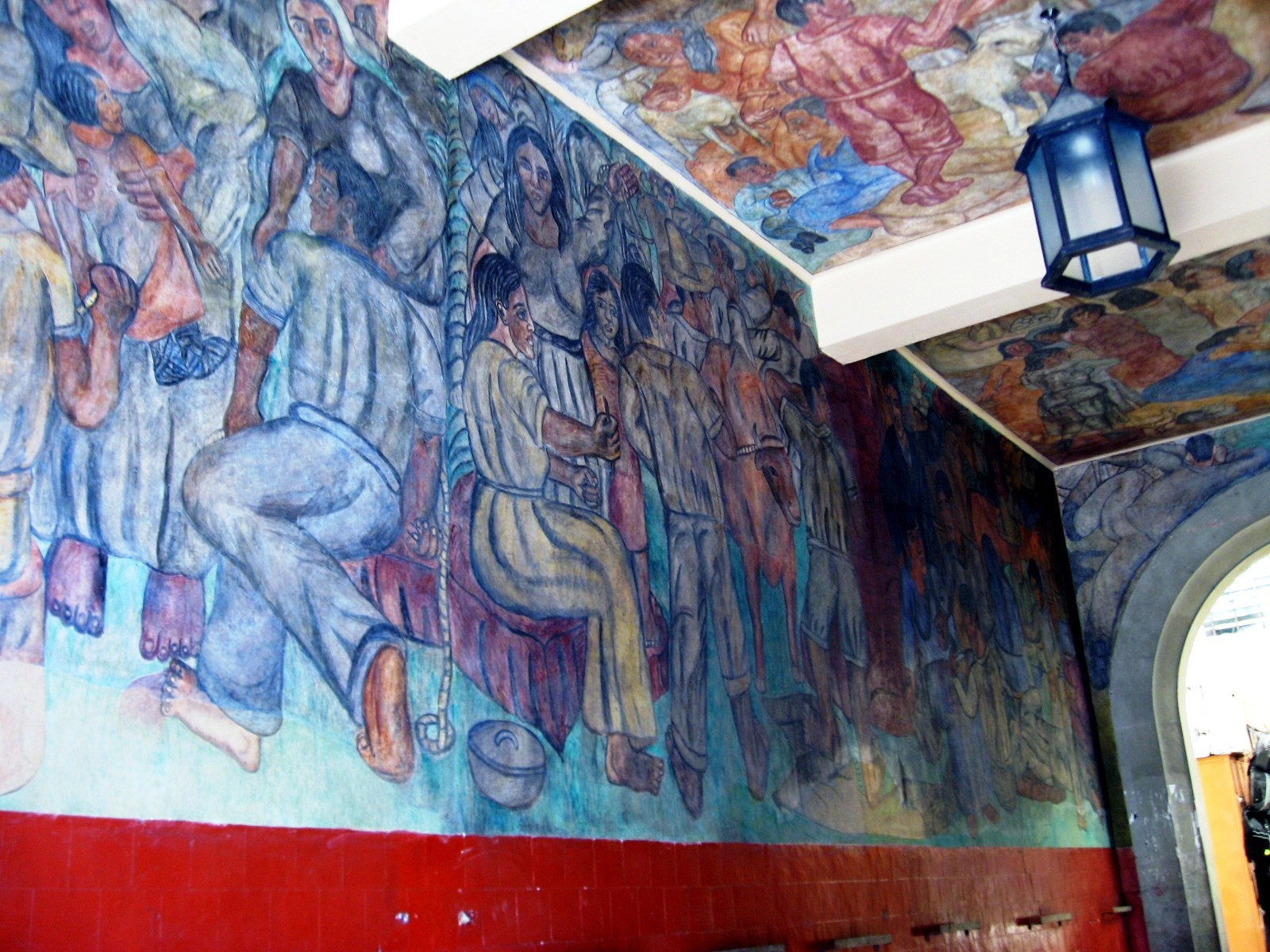
Part of entrance painted by Pablo Rendon

These murals include: Los mercados by Ángel Bracho, Influencia de las vitaminas by Antonio Pujol, Los alimentos y los problemas del obrero by Pedro Rendón, Escenas populares by Ramón Alva Guadarrama, Las labores del campo by Grace Greenwood Ames, La minería by Marion Greenwood, La industrialización del campo and Mercado maya by Raúl Gamboa as well as the copper-plated relief called Historia de México, by Isamu Noguchi.

The murals reflect socialist themes in part due to the policies of the Mexican government to promote the benefits of the 1910 Mexican Revolution. They also reflect the concerns of these artists during this time period, leading to themes such as the exploitation of workers, peasants and miners, the fight against Nazism and fascism, and racial discrimination. On the upper floor, Noguchi created a wall sculpture combined with painting called La historia de Mexico, in which can be seen fists, swastikas, skeletons and Albert Einstein’s formula E=mc2.

This mural work quickly gave the market and the neighborhood around it prominence. It has been ranked fourth in value after the murals in the Palacio de Bellas Artes, the Secretaria de Educacion Publica building and the National Palace. Noguchi's work alone has been valued at two million U.S. dollars. However, in spite of this, these murals are practically unknown by domestic or international visitors to the city.

== Deterioration of murals and other problems ==
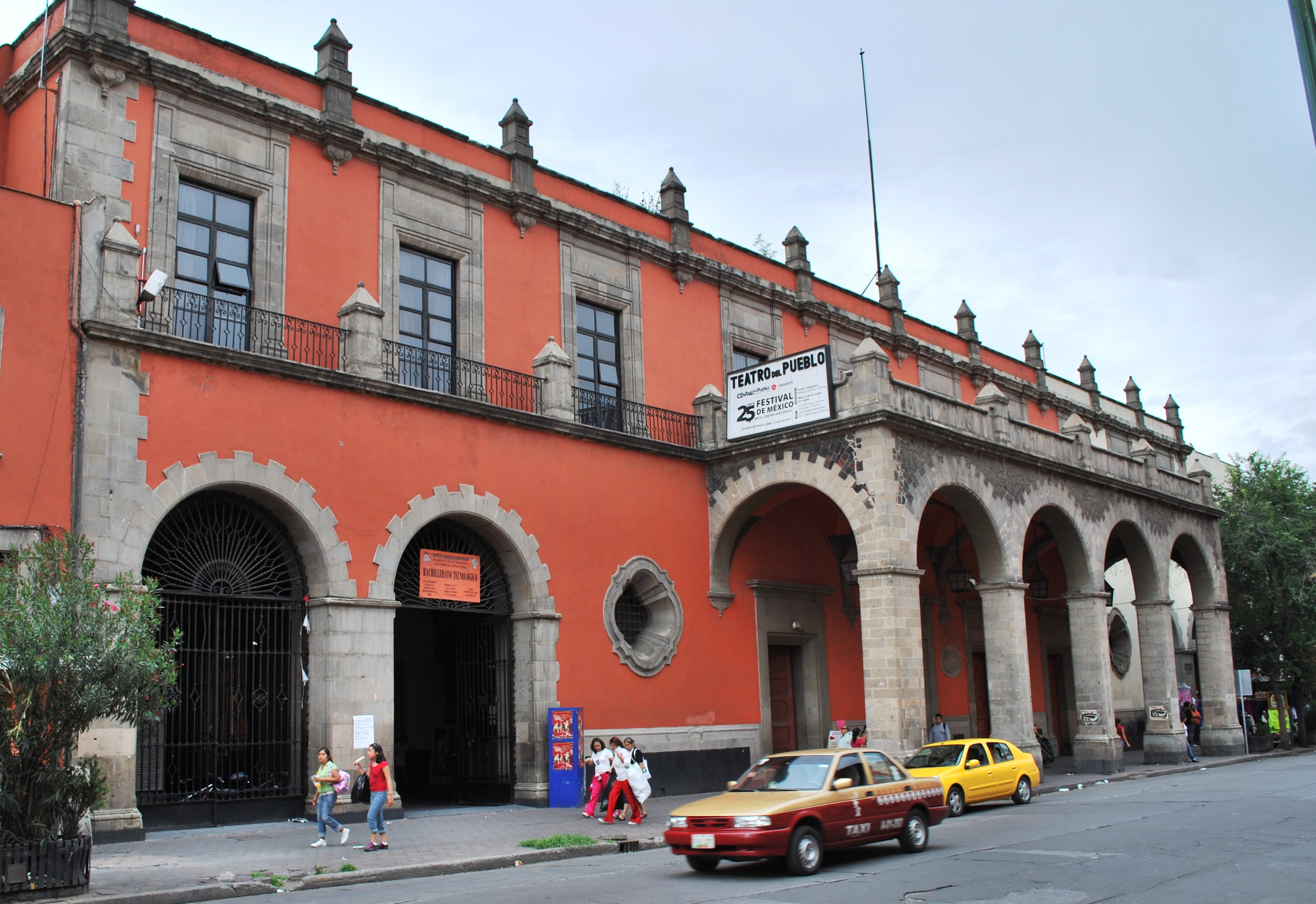
Main entrance to the section of the building that has the Teatro del Pueblo

From the time the murals were painted in the 1930s to 2009, there had been no organized effort by authorities to conserve the murals painted here. The 1985 earthquake, humidity, the passage of time, the lack of maintenance and vandalism took their toll on the artwork. Almost all of the murals showed some level of damage with only the murals painted by Pablo O'Higgins at the entrance located at Del Carmen and Rodriguez Puebla were in good condition. This is primarily because these works were done on the ceiling and upper portions of high walls. One of the murals in the worst condition was Influencia de las vitaminas by Angel Bracho, with over 50% of the surface area damaged, mostly by humidity. A wall that holds a work by Marion Greenwood is cracked, possibly due to the 1985 earthquake. The rest of the paintings are damaged by scratches, humidity and small cracks due to the same earthquake, with those at arms reach suffering from graffiti and other vandalism.

The lack of maintenance and protection of the murals was primarily due to disputes between government agencies such as the Instituto Nacional de Bellas Artes (INBA) and the Mexico City government as to who had the responsibility for them. In 1998, merchants in the market banded together to create an organization to restore the murals and to get the market included in the various tourism promotions of the city government. While this particular effort failed, new efforts surfaced in the 2000s. The merchant association installed acrylic screens over a number of the murals to protect them, but the city government stated that these did not let the murals “breathe” and could cause damage, so they were removed. Until 2008, efforts by merchants had mostly consisted of not letting children play ball against the murals and not leaning merchandise or other materials against them.

Other problems for the market include the large number of wandering and informal street vendors that are on the streets outside market and nearly block passage through the four main entrances into it and block access to the murals with their merchandise. This has been a problem here for over thirty years. In addition, the crime rate in this neighborhood has caused the more than 330 merchants here have seen their sales drop by eighty percent.

== Restoration of murals ==
With more than a thousand square metres of mural work, some of it very valuable, restoration work began in 2009. Promises by the authority for the Historic Center of Mexico City in 2008 gave merchants here hope that needed changes would be made and the market would become as prominent as it was when it opened in 1934. Both the city and the merchants expressed interest in including the market in a tourist corridor to be ready for the Bicentennial celebrations in 2010. A concrete plan with a budget of 2,400,000 pesos was signed by city government, the city's Authority of the Historic Center, the Instituto Nacional de Bellas Artes (INBA) and the Cuauhtémoc borough late in 2008. Work on restoring the murals began in January 2009. Merchants here have expressed willingness to help with restoration of the murals, with which many of them grew up. One example is Hugo León, who runs a juice business that he inherited from his father, located under the mural La elaboración del carbón by Ramón Alva Guadarrama. Work on this mural forced him to move and shut down temporarily, but he says he did so gladly. He and other merchants here have worked to clean the market and make way for the work being done, according to Leticia Ramirez, a leader of the merchants. Restoration work is scheduled to last approximately 23 months.
