= Grace Greenwood =

Grace Greenwood may refer to:

- Grace Greenwood, pseudonym of Sara Jane Lippincott (1823–1904), American writer
- Grace Greenwood Ames (1905–1979), American artist
