= Nassau Community College =

Public college in East Garden City, New York, US

Coordinates: 40.729877°N 73.59223°W

- Motto: "Stay Close, Go Far"
- Type: Public community college
- Established: 1959; 67 years ago
- Parent institution: State University of New York
- Undergraduates: 13,822 (fall 2025)
- Location: Uniondale, New York, United States
- Campus: 225 acres (0.91 km^{2})
- Colors: Navy blue and orange
- Nickname: Lions
- Mascot: Leo the Lion
- Website: ncc.edu

Nassau Community College (NCC) is a public community college in Uniondale, New York, United States. It was founded in 1959 and is part of the State University of New York (SUNY). The college serves the residents of Nassau County.

== History ==
=== 20th century ===
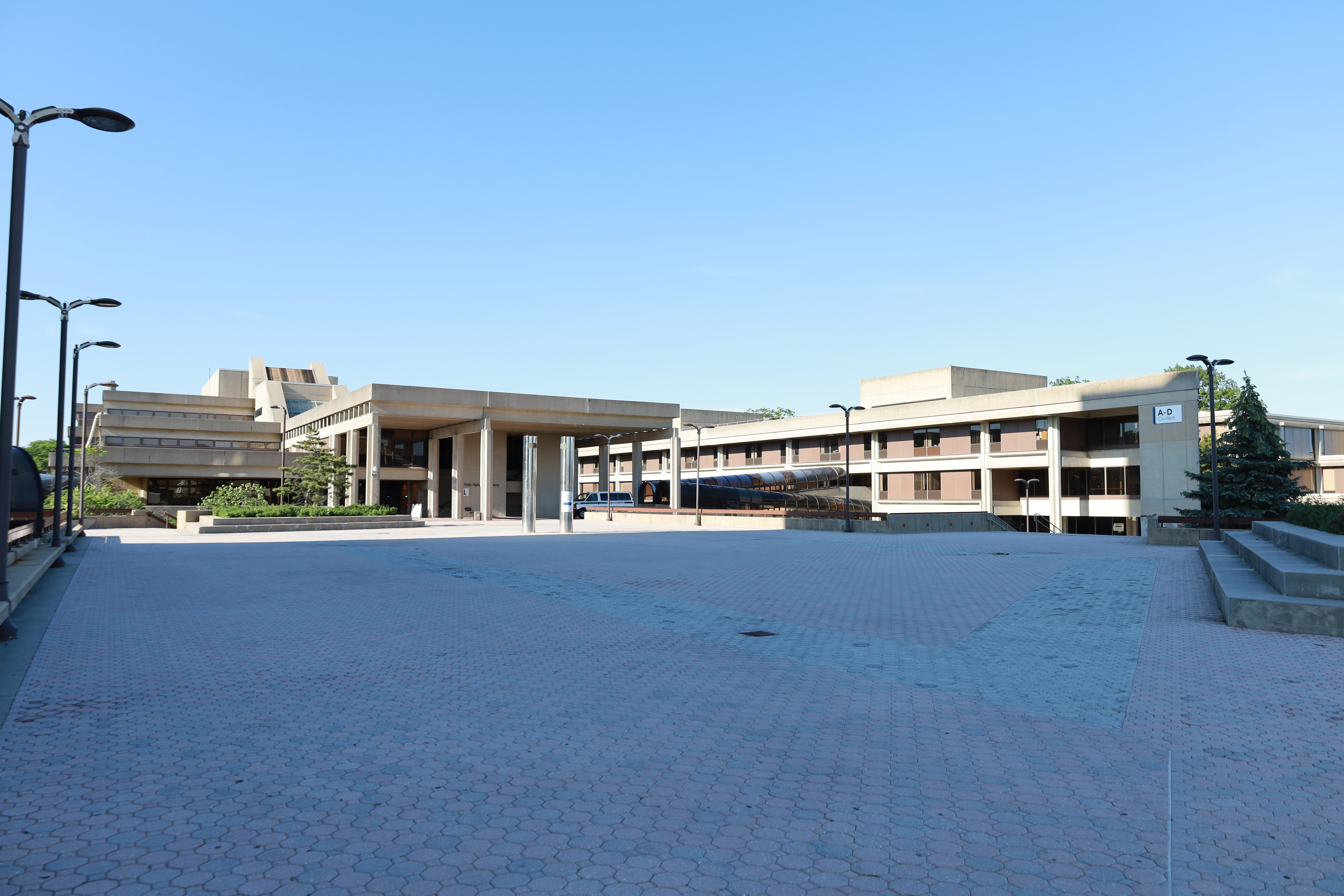
Nassau Community College in 2021

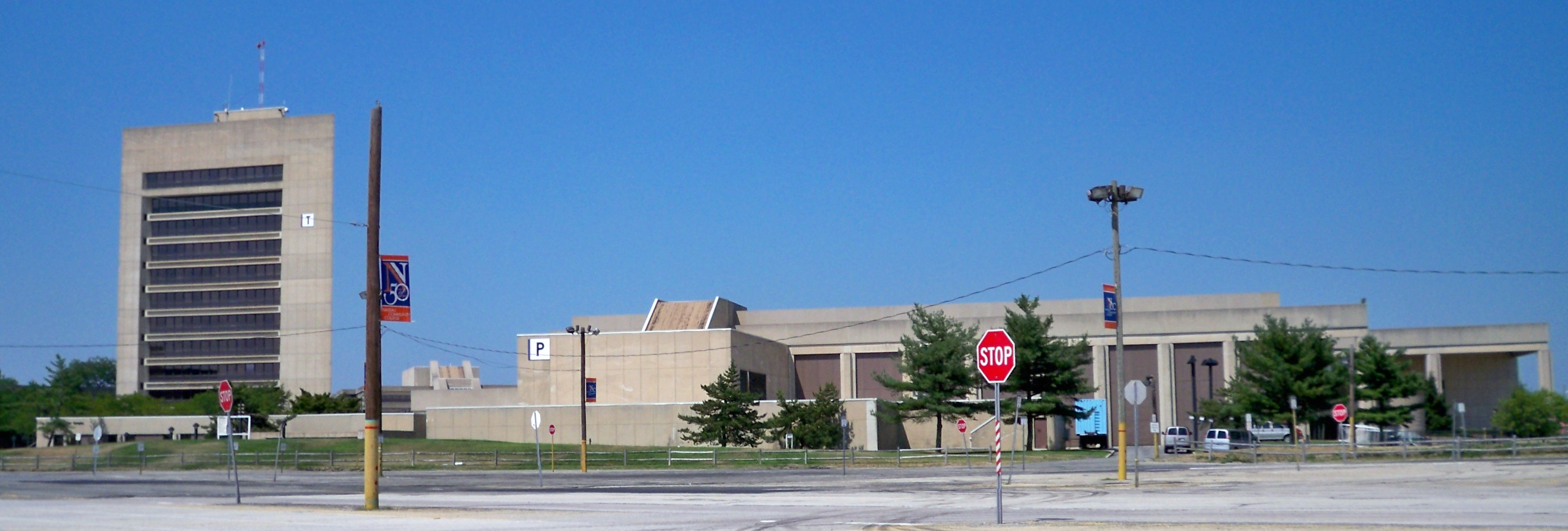
Buildings T and P at Nassau Community College

Ground view of Building T

Nassau Community College was created as part of the State University of New York (SUNY) in 1959. When the college opened on February 1, 1960, it had 632 students, and classes were held in an old courthouse. When Mitchel Air Force Base closed in 1961, the college obtained substantial property, including buildings to develop its new campus; the area is still referred to as Mitchel Field, and the government still retains some housing and other facilities in the vicinity of the school's campus.

=== 21st century ===
On April 16, 2024, the school's food services vendor permanently closed its services, which included the cafeteria, snack bar, and on-campus Starbucks due to the school not entering a new contractual agreement.

In late November 2025, the trustees of Nassau Community College voted unanimously to authorize legal action after the State University of New York (SUNY) Board of Trustees rejected the college's presidential nominee, Maria Conzatti, who had served as interim or acting president for nearly four years. The SUNY board's disapproval was the first time it had blocked a presidential appointment at one of its campuses, prompting Nassau's governing board to prepare a lawsuit challenging the decision. The faculty, often at odds with Conzatti, applauded SUNY's decision. The college’s student government called for a transparent search for new leadership.

On November 19, 2026, a gang-related stabbing occurred in the cafeteria area of the campus.

== Academics ==
NCC offers Associate of Arts degrees in liberal arts, focused on humanities and social sciences, specialized Associate of Arts and Associate of Science transfer degrees, and Associate of Arts and Science degrees and certificate programs designed to serve immediate employment goals of students.

The college operates an astronomy observatory for its courses.

== Notable alumni ==
- Bruce Arena, professional soccer manager
- Arjun Atwal, professional golfer and PGA Tour winner
- Brian Baldinger, sports broadcaster and professional football player
- Phil Baroni, professional mixed martial artist
- Rich Borresen, professional football player
- Steve Buscemi, actor
- Matt Cardona, professional wrestler
- Billy Crystal, comedian
- Luke Cummo, professional mixed martial artist
- Patrick Day, professional boxer
- Tim Dillon, comedian
- Chris Distefano, comedian
- Rasul Douglas, professional football player
- Jay Hieron, professional wrestler and mixed martial artist
- Al Iaquinta, professional wrestler and mixed martial artist
- Steve Israel, U.S. congressman
- Nouman Ali Khan, American Islamic preacher and the founder of the Bayyinah Institute for Arabic and Qur’anic Studies
- Jesse Lacey, musician
- Josh Lafazan, Nassau County legislator
- Ryan LaFlare, mixed martial artist
- Shep Messing, Olympic soccer player and broadcaster
- Rod Morgenstein, drummer, Winger and Dixie Dregs
- John Moschitta Jr., speed talker
- Elliott Murphy, singer, songwriter, and writer
- Bob Nelson, stand-up comedian
- Michael Anthony Pegues, visual artist
- Michael Robinson, professional football player
- Andrew P. Schafer Jr., US Army major general
- Chris Weidman, professional mixed martial artist
