= Ruth Abrams (artist) =

Jewish-American painter

- Born: 1912; Brooklyn, New York, United States
- Died: 12 March 1986 (aged 73–74)
- Education: Columbia University
- Known for: Painting
- Movement: New York School

Ruth Abrams (1912 – 12 March 1986) was a Jewish-American painter.

== Personal ==
Ruth Davidson Abrams was born in Brooklyn, New York. At 19, she was married to urban planner Charles Abrams, and studied at Columbia University.

== Professional ==
From 1965 to 1966, Ruth Abrams was the art director at the Research Association of The New School, and also lectured at the Parsons The New School for Design. Abrams is known for outer-space painting, such as, ''There Are Unknown Elements in the Universe as Old as Mankind'' (1962). She also participated in art classes led by influential artists, including Alexander Archipenko and William Zorach, recognized for their use of abstraction in painting and sculpture.

As a painter, she belonged to the New York School. After her death, a critic from The New York Times remarked that she was "a woman unfairly neglected in a macho era." Her papers are held at the Yeshiva University Museum and the Smithsonian Archives of American Art.

Abrams worked with William Zorach, Alexander Archipenko, John D. Graham, and others.

== Exhibitions ==
Abrams first solo exhibition was held at the Roko Gallery in 1956. An exhibition of Abrams work was held from July 14 to August 26, 1986, following her death, at the Grey Art Gallery and Study Center in New York City. A solo exhibition entitled: "Microcosms: Ruth Abrams, Abstract Expressionist" from August 12, 2012‐January 6, 2013 was held at the Yeshiva University Museum. Many of the canvases in the exhibit were shown for the first time. In 2016 her biography was included in the exhibition catalogue Women of Abstract Expressionism organized by the Denver Art Museum.

== Publications ==
Abrams provided the illustrations for Ekistics, Athens, Greece & Arena-Interbuild (London, Eng., 1967).

== See also ==
- List of artists from Brooklyn
