= Tim Okamura =

Canadian artist

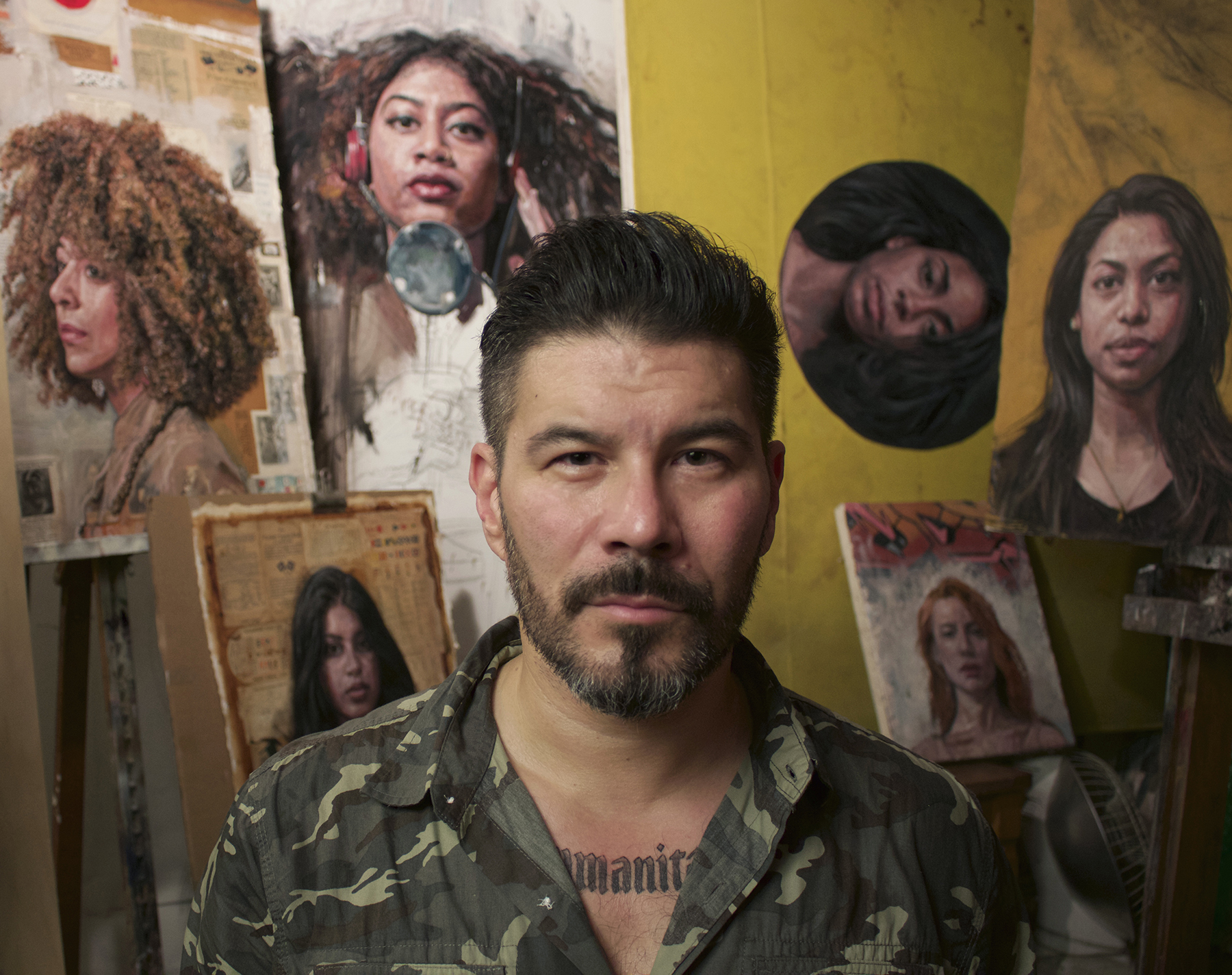
Tim Okamura in his studio (2015)

Tim Okamura (born 1968 in Edmonton, Alberta) is a Japanese Canadian artist known for his contemporary realist portraits that combine graffiti and realism. His work has been on the cover of Time Magazine and has been featured in several major motion pictures. Okamura's paintings are featured in major permanent collections around the world such as London's National Portrait Gallery and Washington DC's National Portrait Gallery. He was also one of several artists to be shortlisted in 2006 for a proposed portrait of Queen Elizabeth of England.

== Biography ==
Okamura earned a B.F.A. with Distinction at the Alberta College of Art and Design in Calgary, Alberta, Canada before moving to New York City to attend the School of Visual Arts. At ACAD he was a stand out, described by former classmates and professors as one of the most gifted alumni ACAD had seen. After graduating from SVA in 1993 with an M.F.A. in Illustration as Visual Journalism, Okamura moved to Brooklyn, New York, where he still resides.

Okamura has had several solo exhibitions in New York and Canada. His work has been shown in several prominent group exhibitions, including After Matisse/Picasso at the MOMA PS.1 in Queens, New York, as well as the BP Portrait Awards Exhibition at London's National Portrait Gallery. Okamura was invited to The White House in 2015 to honor artists whose work addresses issues of social justice, and received a letter of commendation from President Joe Biden. His 2020 portrait of Toni Morrison was chosen for the cover of Time Magazine and his portrait of Dr. Anthony Fauci was acquired by the National Portrait Gallery in Washington, DC. In 2021, the New York Historical Society acquired his 2021 painting Nurse Tracey, which was featured in the exhibition Dreaming Together.

Okamura - a recipient of the 2004 Fellowship in Painting from the New York Foundation for the Arts – has also had his paintings featured in several films including Pieces of April (InDiGent), School of Rock (Paramount), Jersey Girl (Miramax), and most prominently in Prime (Universal), a romantic comedy about a young New York painter starring Uma Thurman and Meryl Streep. Okamura's work is also notable in Ethan Hawke’s The Hottest State.

Tim Okamura’s art is on display in the permanent collections at the Toronto Congress Center, Beaverbrook Public Art Gallery, The New York Historical Society, The National Portrait Gallery, The Hotel Arts in Calgary, Alberta, Canada, and Standard Chartered Bank in London, England. It is also featured in the private collections of Uma Thurman, Ahmir "Questlove" Thompson (The Roots), Spike Lee, John Mellencamp, Ben Younger, and actors Bryan Greenberg, Vanessa Marcil, Annabella Sciorra and Ethan Hawke.

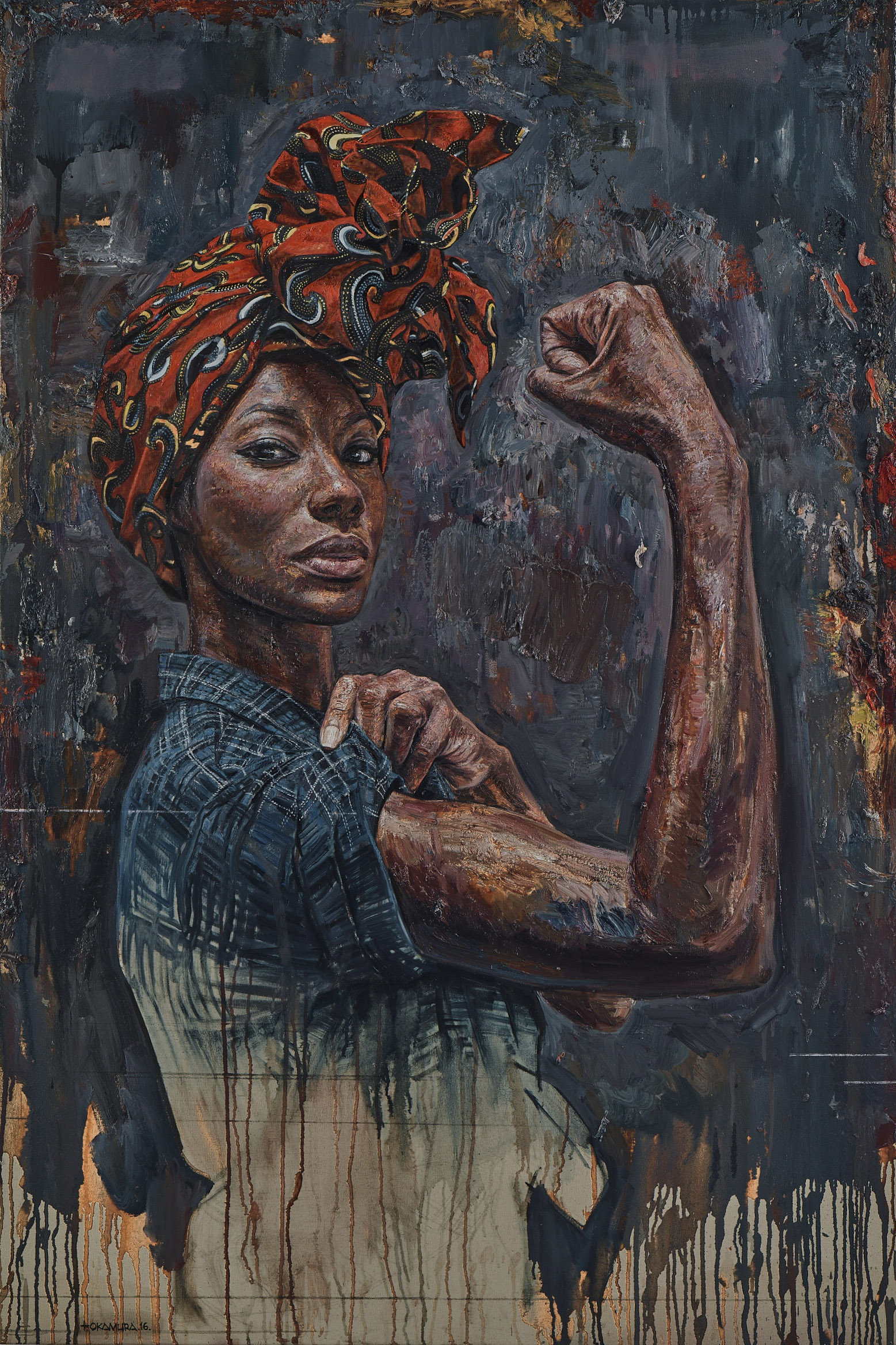
Rosie No. 1, 2016, oil on canvas, 36 x 48"

== Art ==
Tim Okamura investigates identity, the urban environment, metaphor, and cultural iconography through a unique method of painting. Urban life and hip-hop has greatly influenced Okamura's subject matter in his paintings - he often blends classical techniques of oil painting with the spontaneity of spray painted graffiti, combining the academic "realism" of his portrait and figure painting with modern graphics set in contemporary urban environments. The juxtaposition of the rawness and urgency of street art and academic ideals has created a visual language that acknowledges a traditional form of story-telling through portraiture, while infusing the work with resonant contemporary motifs.

== Notable exhibitions ==
=== Solo ===
- 2023: Onna Bugeisha, The August Wilson African American Cultural Center, Pittsburgh, PA
- 2023: Recent Works, Christian Marx Gallery, Düsseldorf, Germany
- 2019: The Message, Meijler Art at Scope Art Fair, Miami, FL
- 2018: Recent Work, Christian Marx Gallery, VOLTA Basel, Switzerland
- 2018: Love, Strength & Soul, Packer Collegiate Institute, Brooklyn, NY
- 2017: My Music at Work, Liquidity Gallery, Okanagan Falls, British Columbia, Canada
- 2017: Begin Transmission, Peter Robertson Gallery, Edmonton, Canada
- 2016 Recent Work, Soho House, New York, NY
- 2016: Work in Progress, Red Bird Gallery, New York, NY
- 2014: Love, Strength & Soul, Yeelen Gallery, Miami, FL
- 2014: Survey 2009 - 2014, National Arts Club, New York, NY
- 2014: Her Story, Douglas Udell Gallery, Vancouver, British Columbia, Canada
- 2013: This Story Has Not Yet Been Told, The Robert and Sallie Brown Gallery and Museum, The Sonja Haynes Stone Center for Black Culture and History, University of North Carolina at Chapel Hill, NC
- 2012: Bronx, Brooklyn, Queens, Douglas Udell GAllery, Edmonton, Alberta, Canada
- 2011: Bronx, Brooklyn, Queens, Lyons Wier Gallery, New York, NY
- 2011: VOLTA NY, Lyons Wier Gallery, New York, NY
- 2009: Brooklyn Walls: hopechangedreams, Douglas Udell Gallery, Edmonton, Alberta, Canada
- 2008: Women in White / Bushwick Walls, Douglas Udell Gallery, Edmonton, Alberta, Canada
- 2006: Urban Portraits + Brooklyn Mythology, Axis Art, Calgary, Alberta, Canada
- 2005: Urban Portraits + Brooklyn Mythology, Delgado-Tomei Gallery, Brooklyn, NY. First exhibition of "King", a large-scale portrait of Martin Luther King Jr.
- 2003: New Urban Portraits + Bricks, Locks, & Obstacles, Kanvas Gallery, NY, NY

=== Two-person ===
- 2014: Recent Work, with Jerome Lagarrique, White Room, Liquid Art System, Capri, Italy
- 2009: Love, Strength, & Soul, with TheKidBelo, Show & Tell Gallery, Toronto, Ontario, Canada
- 2007: Brooklyn Mythology: The First Nations Cycle (with Thekidbelo), Axis Art, Calgary, Alberta, Canada

=== Group ===
- 2022: Go Brooklyn Go Brooklyn, The Brooklyn Collective, Charlotte, NC
- 2021: Coup D’État, The Brooklyn Collective, Miami, FL
- 2021: Dreaming Together, New York Historical Society and Asia Society Museum, New York, NY
- 2020: 2020 Vision, Southampton Art Center, Southampton, NY
- 2019: Still I Rise, Massachusetts Museum of Contemporary Art, North Adams, MA
- 2019: Respect, Casita Maria Center for Arts & Education, Bronx, NY
- 2018: Painting the Figure Now, Wausau Museum of Contemporary Art, Wausau, WI
- 2018: The Outwin: American Portraiture Today, Ackland Art Museum, University of North Carolina at Chapel Hill, Chapel Hill, NC
- 2018: Fresh Paint, Meijler Art, The Steinhardt Museum of Natural History, Tel Aviv, Israel
- 2017: Scope Art Fair, Meijler Art, Miami Beach, FL
- 2017: The Outwin: American Portraiture Today, Kemper Museum of Contemporary Art, Kansas City, MO
- 2017: Special Project: VOLTA New York, New York, NY
- 2017: Art Karlsrühe, Christian Marx Gallery, Karlsrühe, Germany
- 2016: Liberty and Justice for Some, Walter Maciel Gallery, Los Angeles, CA
- 2016: Art for Rights, Amnesty International, Los Angeles, CA
- 2016: Duets: A Comparison of Realities, Fort Works Art, Fort Worth, TX
- 2016: About Face with Amy Sherald, Ebony G Patterson & Rozeal, Creative Alliance, Baltimore, MD
- 2016: Urban Dawn Vol. II, The Loft, Beirut, Lebanon
- 2016: The Outwin: American Portraiture Today, Smithsonian National Portrait Gallery, Washington, DC
- 2015: Scope Art Fair, Miami, Mika Gallery, Miami, FL
- 2015: ACT/ART EXHIBITION, East Wing of the White House, Washington, DC
- 2015: Sublime: Harlem, 345 Gallery, New York, NY
- 2015: Urban Development, Castle Fitzjohns Gallery, New York, NY
- 2015: The Outwin: American Portraiture Today, Smithsonian National Portrait Gallery, Washington, DC
- 2015: Implicit Bias, Joan Hisaoka Healing Arts Gallery, Washington, DC
- 2015: Power, Protest, & Resistance: The Art of Revolution, Rush Arts Gallery, New York, NY
- 2015: Trophy Art, Azart Gallery, New York, NY
- 2015: Spring Preview, Douglas Udell Gallery, Edmonton, Canada
- 2015: International Salon of June, LAC, Machala, Ecuador
- 2015: Jumping the Line, Artiz Group in Harlem, New York, NY
- 2015: Light of the Ancestors, Pepco Edison Place Gallery, Washington, DC
- 2015: Artists Gaze: Seeing Women in the 21st Century, Sirona Fine Art, Hallandale Beach, FL
- 2014: Scope Art Fair, Miami, Castle Fitzjohns Gallery, Miami, FL
- 2014: Istanbul Contemporary Art Fair, White Room / Liquid Art System, Istanbul, Turkey
- 2014: CONTEXT Art Fair, Miami Beach, White Room / Liquid Art System, Miami, FL
- 2014: Identity, Snap! Orlando, Orlando, FL
- 2014: Behind Narrative, One Art Space, New York, NY
- 2014: Fixation, Zhou B Art Center, Chicago, IL
- 2014: For the Time Being, Koki Arts, Tokyo, Japan
- 2014: MIA in MIA, Lyons Wier Gallery, New York, NY
- 2014: Resurgence: Works from the Collection, Yeelen Gallery, Miami, FL
- 2013: Round Zero, The Art Director's Club, New York, NY
- 2013: Body Politic, The National Arts Club, New York, NY
- 2013: From Motion to Stillness, Zhou B Art Center, Chicago, IL
- 2012: Scope Miami 2012, Evan Lurie Gallery, Miami, FL
- 2012: Toronto International Art Fair, Lyons Wier Gallery, Toronto, CA
- 2012: The Box That Rocks, Museum of Contemporary African Diasporan Arts, Brooklyn, NY
- 2011: Pulse International Art Fair, Lyons Wier Gallery, Miami, FL
- 2011: BP Portrait Awards Exhibition, National Portrait Gallery, London, UK
- 2011: Here and Now, Lyons Wier Gallery, New York, NY
- 2010: Pulse International Art Fair, Lyons Wier Gallery, Gallery, Miami, FL
- 2010: BP Portrait Awards Exhibition, National Portrait Gallery, London, UK
- 2010: The Gentrification of Brooklyn: The Pink Elephant Speaks, The Museum of Contemporary African Diasporan Arts, Brooklyn, NY
- 2009: BP Portrait Awards Exhibition, National Portrait Gallery, London, UK
- 2008: BP Portrait Awards Exhibition, National Portrait Gallery, London, UK
- 2007: Toronto International Art Fair, Toronto, Ontario, Canada
- 2007: Fall Preview, Douglass Udell Gallery, Edmonton, Alberta, Canada
- 2007: Spring Show, Douglass Udell Gallery, Edmonton, Alberta, Canada
- 2006: BP Portrait Awards Exhibition, National Portrait Gallery, London, UK
- 2005: BP Portrait Awards Exhibition, Scottish National Portrait Gallery, Edinburgh, Scotland
- 2005: BP Portrait Awards Exhibition, National Portrait Gallery, London, UK
- 2004: BP Portrait Awards Exhibition, National Portrait Gallery, London, UK
- 2004: BP Portrait Awards Exhibition, Aberdeen Art Gallery, Aberdeen, Scotland
- 2004: Commissioned/Non Commissioned, Chung-Cheng Gallery, St. John's University, Queens, New York
- 2004: BP Portrait Awards Exhibition, National Portrait Gallery, London, UK
- 2003: After Matisse/Picasso, P.S.1/MoMA, Queens, NY

== Bibliography ==
Print

2023

- "O'Ree to be honored with portrait in New Brunswick hometown Wednesday" 01 January 2023 NHL

2022

- "Set Against a Backdrop of World Events, Tim Okamura’s Bold Portraits Emanate Commanding Energy" 07 July 2022

2021

- "Painting Bravery: A portrait artist tries to capture the remarkable spirit of nurses on the front lines of the pandemic" 02 June 2021 The Washington Post
- "Curator Confidential: Explore Our New Acquisition "Nurse Tracey" 17 July 2021. New York Historical Society.

2020

- Hamilton, Darrick. Zewde, Naomi. "Truth and Redistribution: How to Fix the Racial Wealth Gap, End Plutocracy, and Build Black Power." 26 Aug. 2020. Yes Magazine 27 Nov. 2020. <https://www.yesmagazine.org/issue/black-lives/2020/08/26/racial-wealth-gap-black-power/>
- "5 Stages of COVID-19: Canadian Painter Goes From Pandemic Denial to Appreciating It's Heroes." 8 Sep. 2020. CBC News 27 Nov. 2020. <https://www.cbc.ca/news/canada/edmonton/tim-okamura-covid-19-painter-1.5713535>
- Black, Morgan. "Edmonton-raised Artist Tim Okamura Creates Portrait Series Honouring Health-care Workers." 16 Nov. 2020. Global News 27 Nov. 2020. <https://globalnews.ca/news/7465371/tim-okamura-covid-19-healthcare-workers-portrait-series/>
- Barnes, Sara. "Dynamic Paintings Fuse Realism with Rawness to Depict Empowering Portraits of Women." 17 Feb 2020. My Modern Met 27 Nov. 2020. <https://mymodernmet.com/tim-okamura-portrait-painting/>
- Waithe, Lena. "Toni Morrison- 100 Women of the Year." 5 Mar. 2020. TIME Magazine 27 Nov. 2020. <https://time.com/5793725/toni-morrison-100-women-of-the-year/>
- Sparks, Cassidy. "Artwork from Jack Daniel's Art Beats + Lyrics." 19 Jan 2020. Rolling Out 27 Nov. 2020. <https://rollingout.com/2020/01/18/artwork-from-atlantas-jack-daniels-atlanta-art-beats-and-lyrics/>
- Barylski, Nicole. "New York Academy of Art's 2020 Hamptons Exhibition to Reflect Upon the Past and Look Towards the Future." 22 Jul. 2020. Hamptons.com 27 Nov 2020. <https://www.hamptons.com/mobile/The-Arts/In-the-Galleries/26735/New-York-Academy-Of-Arts-2020-Hamptons.html#.X8F9fV57nUJ>

2019

- Ebert, Grace. "Striking Portraits Featuring Powerful Women of Color Painted by Artist Tim Okamura." 23 Dec 2019. Colossal 27 Nov. 2020 <https://www.thisiscolossal.com/2019/12/tim-okamura-portraits-women/>
- Metzger, Andy. "The Art of Family Re-unification." 10 Oct. 2019. CommonWealth Journal 27 Nov. 2020. <https://commonwealthmagazine.org/arts-and-culture/the-art-of-family-reunification/>

2016

- Griwkowsky, Fish. "EIFF Opening-night film features ex-Edmonton Painter." 29 Sep. 2016. Edmonton Journal 27 Nov. 2020 <https://edmontonjournal.com/entertainment/eiff-opening-night-film-features-ex-edmonton-painter>

2015

- Kiryango, Tracy. "Meet Tim Okamura- An Artist Finding Inspiration in Everyday New Yorkers." 26 Nov 2015. Express Newspapers UK 27 Nov. 2020. <https://www.express.co.uk/news/world/622364/Tim-Okamura-artist-streets-US>

2014

- Folgar, Abel. "Tim Okamura’s Show ‘Love, Strength, & Soul’ is an Ode to African American Women." 2 Dec. 2014. Société Perrier 14 Jan. 2015. <.http://www.societeperrier.com/us/miami/tim-okamuras-show-love-strength-soul-is-an-ode-to-african-american-women/>.
- Schuller, Rae. "Tim Okamura." Sept. 2014. Marker Magazine 14 Jan. 2015. <http://markermagazine.com/tim-okamura/>.
- "Ribbon Rouge Together with: Tim Okamura!" 15 Nov. 2014. Ribbon Rouge 14 Jan. 2015. <https://web.archive.org/web/20150128164611/http://ribbonrouge.com/ribbon-rouge-together-tim-okamura/>.
- "Tim Okamura Takes on Miami." 1 Dec. 2014. Houston Museum of African American Culture 14 Jan. 2015. <https://web.archive.org/web/20150128114012/http://hmaacvoices.org/2014/12/01/tim-okamura-takes-on-miami/>.
- Sibeudu, Chidinma. "Connected: Tim Okamura." 25 June 2014. Vortex 247 12 Jan. 2015. <http://www.vortex247.com/lifestyle/art/connected-tim-okamura/>.
- Hays, Jeanine. "Tim Okamura’s Soulful City Girls." 4 Aug. 2014. Aphro Chic 12 Jan. 2015. <http://aphrochic.com/2014/08/04/tim-okamuras-soulful-city-girls/>.
- Candy, Eye. "Tim Okamura-The Hair Renaissance." 23 Jan. 2014. Afropunk 12 Jan. 2015. <https://web.archive.org/web/20150128114947/http://www.afropunk.com/profiles/blogs/tim-okamura-the-hair-renaissance-1>.
- Caro. "Strength and Soul in New Works by Tim Okamura." 7 Oct. 2014. Hi Fructose 12 Jan. 2015. <http://hifructose.com/2014/10/07/strength-and-soul-in-new-works-by-tim-okamura/>.
- Tschida, Anne and Jane Wooldridge. "For Art Aficionados, a New Wynwood Emerges to the North." 29 Nov. 2014. Miami Herald 12 Jan. 2015. <http://www.miamiherald.com/entertainment/visual-arts/art-basel/article4200990.html>.
- "Momento: Tim Okamura Exhibition (w/ a muse)." 24 Feb. 2014. The Sound of Art 12 Jan. 2015. <https://web.archive.org/web/20150128132624/http://soalife.com/momento-tim-okamura-exhibitionw-a-muse/>.
- Arroyo, Eddie. "Love, Strength, and Soul/Tim Okamura/Yeelen Gallery" 23 Nov. 2014. Art Is About... [Miami] 12 Jan. 2015. <http://artisabout.com/2014/11/23/love-strength-and-soul-tim-okamura-yeelen-gallery/>.
- "Can’t Put Down the Brush: A Profile on Tim Okamura." 26 Aug. 2014. Addmag 12 Jan. 2015. <>.
- Jackson-Brown, Carter. "Love Strength & Soul: Tim Okamura’s Love, Strength & Soul at Yeelen Gallery." 26 Dec. 2014. Tropicult 12 Jan. 2015. <http://tropicult.com/2014/12/tim-okamuras-love-strength-soul-at-yeelen-gallery/>.
- "Art Basel Briefs." 6 Dec. 2014. Pure Honey 12 Jan. 2015. <http://www.purehoneymagazine.com/art-basel-briefs/>.
- "Tim Okamura: His Point of View." 9 Feb. 2014. Visionary Artistry 14 Jan. 2015. <https://web.archive.org/web/20150128131912/http://visionaryartistrymag.com/2014/02/tim-okamura-his-point-of-view/>.

2013

- "Art Star. Tim Okamura." 29 Oct. 2013. Superselected 14 Jan. 2015. <http://superselected.com/art-star-tim-okamura/>.
- "Artist Talk/Depicted/Connected: Paintings by Tim Okamura." 17 Oct. 2013. Popville [Washington, D.C.] 14 Jan. 2015. <https://web.archive.org/web/20150128113806/http://www.popville.com/event/artists-talk-depictedconnected-paintings-by-tim-okamura/>.
- Rae, Haniya. "Heavyweight Paint." 17 June 2013. Guernica 12 Jan. 2015. <https://www.guernicamag.com/art/heavyweight-paint/>.
- "Q&A with Tim Okamura: A Painter with a Purpose." 29 Aug. 2013. SVA.edu 12 Jan. 2015. <http://blog.sva.edu/2013/08/qa-with-tim-okamura-a-painter-with-a-purpose/>.
- Estrada, Sheryl. "Painter Tim Okamura Offers an Urban Narrative in Two Exhibitions." 10 Sept. 2013. Huffington Post 12 Jan. 2015. <http://www.huffingtonpost.com/sheryl-estrada/painter-tim-okamura-offer_b_3894320.html>.
- "Depicted/Connected: Paintings by Tim Okamura." 19 Sept. 2013. Art (202) 12 Jan. 2015. <https://web.archive.org/web/20160303224900/http://art202.com/2013/09/19/depictedconnected-paintings-by-tim-okamura/>.
- Scott, Adriana. "A Conversation with Tim Okamura." 10 Apr. 2013. Chaos Magazine 12 Jan. 2015. <https://web.archive.org/web/20150128113019/http://www.chaos-mag.com/a-conversation-with-tim-okamura/>.
- Bellamy, Cliff. "Up Close and Life Size." 14 Sept. 2013. The Herald Sun [Durham, North Carolina] 12 Jan. 2015. <>.
- Pendana, Sharon. "Tim Okmura." 4 Oct. 2013. The Trove 12 Jan. 2015. <https://web.archive.org/web/20131008132533/http://inthetrove.com/bio/tim-okamura/>.
- "Artist Spotlight: Tim Okamura." 2013. 2dots.com 12 Jan. 2015. <https://web.archive.org/web/20150128133336/http://www.2dots.co/2013/06/Tim-Okamura.html>.

2012

- "Neighborhood Beat: Bushwick: Artist Tim Okamura, Hydroponic Farming at Boswyck Farms, Herbalist Anit Hora, Arepera Guacuco Restaurant." 18 Oct. 2012. Brooklyn Independent Media. 12 Jan. 2015. <https://web.archive.org/web/20150128114632/http://bricartsmedia.org/events/neighborhood-beat-bushwick-artist-tim-okamura-hydroponic-farming-at-boswyck>.
- Kearse, Stephen. "Exclusive Interview X Photos: The Heavyweight Painters talk Hip-Hop, Art and Boxing. Who Said Fine Art Wasn’t Cool?" 4 July 2012. RESPECT 14 Jan. 2015. <http://respect-mag.com/exclusive-interview-x-photos-the-heavyweight-painters-fuse-hip-hop-art-and-boxing-who-said-fine-art-wasnt-cool/>.
- "Heavyweight Paint" 25 October 2012. Heavyweight Paint 14 January 2015.

2011

- Stelloh, Tim. "20 Years Later, Artists Apply Healing Touch to Crown Heights." 26 August 2011. The New York Times Blog. 12 January 2015.
- Katz, Matthew. "New Exhibits to Kick off Chelsea Gallery Season." 31 August 2011. DNAinfo (New York) 12 January 2015.
- Katz, Matthew. "Chelsea Exhibit to Highlight New York Women." 30 August 2011. DNAinfo (New York) 12 January 2015.
- Andrieux, Amy. "Tim Okamura: Realisms." 2011. The Stark Life 12 January 2015.
- Quann, Cipriana. "Tim Okamura." 6 September 2011. Urban Bush Babes 12 January 2015.
- Nabakooza, Kasalina Maliamu. "Interview with Artist Tim Okamura." 4 February 2011. Kasalina Maliamu Nabakooza. 12 January 2015.
- "African-American Women Through Eyes of Multiracial Artist." 12 September 2011. National Public Radio 12 January 2015.
- "Afro Art: Tim Okamura." 2011. Rockin’ It Napptural 12 January 2015.
- Cheney, Alexandra. "An Art Fair’s Singular Vision." 5 March 2011. Wall Street Journal 12 January 2015.
- Wimberly, Dexter. "Tim Okamura." NY Arts Magazine Spring 2011: 121.

2010

- Perkins, Dee. "Tim Okamura." H.A.S. Magazine Jan. 2010: 32–35.
- Lazarowitz, Elizabeth. "Psst! Gentrification! : Artists Dare to Discuss It." New York Daily News 12 Jan. 2010: 4.
- Menendez, Didi. "Tim Okamura." Poets and Artists May 2010: 98–107.

2009

- Johnson, Mia. "Tim Okamura – Brooklyn Walls : hopechangedreams." Preview Magazine June/July/Aug. 2009: 32.
- Mansfield, Susan. "Art review : Treasured Places / BP Portrait Award 2008." The Scotsman 2 Jan. 2009.

2008

- Grant, Andrea. "Interview with Tim Okamura." 2008 Copious Magazine [New York] 12 Jan. 2015. <http://www.copiousmagazine.com/08_summer/art+photography/tim_okamura.html>.
- Bouchard, Gilbert. "Urban Grit Inspires ‘Blue-Collar’ Portrait Artist." The Edmonton Journal [Alberta] 27 June 2008: F10.
- Gohill, Maya. "Tim Okamura & The Kidbelo." Mosaic Magazine Winter 2008: 4–5.

2007

- Field, Liz. "From New York to Calgary: One Show Brings Two Artists Together." The Weal 29 Nov. 2007: 1.
- Vallantin, Candice. "Classically Urban." Avenue Magazine [New York] Nov. 2007: 166.

2006

- Pfliger, Rebecca. "Tim Okamura: Guru of Graffiti." The Gauntlet [Alberta] 25 May 2006: 8.
- LaFortune, Wes. "TIM OKAMURA, Urban Portraits and Brooklyn Mythology, May 18–28, 2006, Axis Contemporary Art, Calgary." 30 Apr. 2006 Calgary Galleries West Magazine 12 Jan. 2015. <http://www.gallerieswest.ca/art-reviews/exhibition-reviews/tim-okamura%2C-%22urban-portraits-and-brooklyn-mythology%2C%22-may-18-%E2%80%94-28%2C-2006%2C-axis-contemporary-art%2C-calgary/>.
- Gudowska, Malwina. "Urban Legend." Ego Magazine [Canada] May 2006: 133–141.
- Gale, Iain. "You’ve Been Framed." 8 Jan. 2006 The Scotsman 12 Jan. 2015. <http://www.scotsman.com/news/you-ve-been-framed-1-1407031>.

2005

- Nicholls, Liz. "Tim Okamura, Artist to the Stars." The Edmonton Journal [Alberta] 29 Oct. 2005: E1.
- Burroughs, Alexandra. "Calgarian Paints Way to Hollywood." The Calgary Herald [Alberta] 28 Oct. 2005: C5.
- Beeber, Al. "Artist is in His Prime." The Lethbridge Herald [Alberta] 28 Oct. 2005: C8.

2004

- Lepage, Mark. "Edmonton’s Big-Screen Artist: Clients Include Eminem, Hollywood Blockbusters." The Edmonton Journal [Alberta] 28 Mar. 2004: B1.

2003

- Boettcher, Shelley. "Albertan has Become a Painter to the Stars: Tim Okamura’s Art Appears in Several Major Films." The Calgary Herald [Alberta] 30 Nov. 2003: D4.
- Andrusky, Joanna. "Park Raised Artist Takes A Bite Off the Big Apple." Sherwood Park News [Alberta] 17 Apr. 2003: 15–16.

2002

- Kemp, Courtney A. "Would Posing Nude Change Your Body Image?" Marie Claire Oct. 2002: 132–140.
- LeManne, Michaelle. "September 2002: Raw Talent." Avenue Magazine [New York] Sept. 2002: 21.

2001

- Sewell, Brian. "Blood is left on the Canvas." Evening Standard [London] 13 July 2001: 26–27.
- Packer, William. "Photo-Realism, Pure and Simple." London Financial Times 30 June 2001: VI.

1999

- "Figurative and Portrait Show." Greenpoint Gazette [New York] 24 Mar. 1999: 18.
- Taube, Rob. "Building A Williamsburg Bridge." The Brooklyn Skyline 16 Mar. 1999: 1–2.

1996

- Fenniak, Maureen. "Art of a Common Birth." See Magazine 18–24 July 1996: 16.

Film (Artist: Paintings)

- Okamura, Tim, artist: painting. Urge. Dir. Aaron Kaufman. Central Park Films, 2015.
- Okamura, Tim, artist: painting. The Hottest State. Dir. James DeMonaco. THINKFilm, 2006.
- Okamura, Tim, artist: painting. Prime. Dir. Ben Younger. Universal Pictures, 2005.
- Okamura, Tim, artist: painting. Jersey Girl. Dir. Kevin Smith. Miramax, 2004.
- Okamura, Tim, artist: painting. Just Another Story. Dir. GQ. Showtime Networks, 2003.
- Okamura, Tim, artist: painting. School of Rock. Dir. Richard Linklater. Paramount Pictures, 2003.
- Okamura, Tim, artist: painting and scenic painting. Pieces of April. Dir. Peter Hedges. United Artists, 2003.
- Okamura, Tim, artist: painting. Unfaithful. Dir. Adrian Lyne. Twentieth Century Fox Film Corporation, 2002.

Documentary (Artist: Subject of Documentary)

- Okamura, Tim, artist. Heavyweight Paint. Dir. Jeff Martini. 2013.

Music Video (Director)

- Okamura, Tim, dir. "Won’t Lay Down." Performed by Wonderkiss. 2014.

== See also ==
- List of artists from Brooklyn
