= Charles Abrams =

American urban planner (1901–1970)

Charles Abrams (September 20, 1901 – February 22, 1970) was Polish-born Jewish-American lawyer, author, urbanist, and housing expert, best known for creating New York City's Housing and Development Administration in the 1960s. He is credited with coining the phrase 'Socialism for the rich and capitalism for the poor.'

== Early life ==
Abrams was born in Vilna, Poland as the youngest of four children in an Orthodox Jewish family and immigrated to the United States with his family in 1904. The family settled in the Williamsburg neighborhood of Brooklyn, New York. He earned his law degree from Brooklyn Law School in 1922 and quickly achieved financial success through his work as a real estate lawyer and speculator. In 1928, he married Ruth Davidson, an artist.

== Career in urban development ==
Throughout his career, Abrams served as a lawyer, public official, activist, author, and educator, leaving a profound impact on public housing and urban studies in the United States and Western Europe. He coauthored the New York Municipal Housing Authorities Law in 1933 and successfully argued the landmark case New York City Housing Authority v. Muller before the U.S. Supreme Court in 1936. This decision affirmed the Authority's right to use eminent domain to clear slums and build public housing, broadening the interpretation of public use and solidifying Abrams' legacy as the Authority's first counsel.

Abrams held academic positions at various universities and was a staunch advocate for public housing and homeownership for the underprivileged, while also critiquing systemic discrimination and the business welfare state. He authored seven books aimed at a general audience, explaining housing policies and the pressing need for reforms. His expertise extended internationally, as he participated in over 20 missions to establish housing authorities and planning schools worldwide.

From 1955 to 1959, Abrams led the New York State Commission Against Discrimination and later served as president of the National Committee Against Discrimination in Housing from 1961 to 1965. During his tenure, he drafted legislation to extend protections under the New York State Law Against Discrimination to housing financed by the Federal Housing Administration (FHA) and the Veterans Administration (VA). After leaving SCAD in 1959, Abrams served as president of the National Committee Against Discrimination in Housing (1961–1965), where he successfully advocated for an Executive Order prohibiting discrimination in federally subsidized housing.

== Contributions to urban studies ==
Abrams was a pioneer in the field of urban studies, the systematic examination of cities and their inhabitants. As a visiting professor at institutions including the New School for Social Research, the University of Pennsylvania, Massachusetts Institute of Technology, and Columbia University. His ideas reached broader audiences through seven books, including the landmark 1955 work Forbidden Neighbors, which explored housing discrimination, as well as numerous articles and newspaper pieces.

== International career ==
He undertook several missions for the United Nations, contributing to the establishment of housing authorities and planning schools in developing countries. In 1951, Abrams was sent to Turkey by the United Nations as a consultant on housing planning. During his work, he highlighted the significant role architects and urban planners must play in addressing housing issues. However, he noted that the number of higher education institutions in Turkey training architects at the time was insufficient to meet the demand. As a result of his findings and the pressing needs of the period, it was decided to establish a school of architecture and urban planning in Ankara, which became Middle East Technical University. His experiences from these missions were summarized in his influential 1964 book, Man's Struggle for Shelter in an Urbanizing World.

== Works ==
- Revolution in Land, Harper & Brothers, 1939; Arno Press, 1979, ISBN 9780405113161
- A housing program for America, League for Industrial Democracy, 1947
- U.N. Report on a University in Turkey: The Need for Training and Education for Housing and Planning, 1955
- Forbidden Neighbors: a Study of Prejudice in Housing, Associated Faculty Press, 1955, ISBN 9780804614962
- The city is the frontier, Harper & Row, 1965
- Man's Struggle for Shelter in an Urbanizing World, MIT Press, 1966, ISBN 9780262510011
- The language of cities; a glossary of terms, Volume 14, Viking Press, 1971

== See also ==
- New York City Housing Authority
- Socialism for the rich and capitalism for the poor
- Ruth Abrams
