= Stephen Shames =

American photojournalist (born 1947)

Stephen Shames (born 1947, in Cambridge, Massachusetts) is an American photojournalist who for over 50 years has used his photography to raise awareness of social issues, with a particular focus on child poverty, solutions to child poverty, and race. He testified about child poverty to the United States Senate in 1986. Shames was named a Purpose Prize Fellow in 2010 by Encore.org for his work helping AIDS orphans and former child soldiers in Africa. Kehrer Verlag is publishing his retrospective, Stephen Shames: a lifetime in photography.

== Photography ==
Shames is the author of eleven photography book monographs and a zine, including: Stephen Shames: A Lifetime in Photography (Kehrer Verlag, 2024), Comrade Sisters: Women of the Black Panther Party (ACC Art Books, 2022) co-authored with Ericka Huggins,Stephen Shames, Une Retrospective (Maison de la Photographie Robert Doisneau de Gentilly), Power to the People: The World of the Black Panthers (Abrams, 2016), co-authored with Bobby Seale, Outside the Dream: Child Poverty in America (Aperture), Pursuing the Dream: What Helps Children and Their Families Succeed(Aperture), The Black Panthers (Aperture), Bronx Boys (University of Texas Press, 2014), Facing Race, Free to Grow, and Transforming Lives;

Shames is the author of a zine Youth (Dashwood, 2023) and an electronic book Bronx Boys (FotoEvidence, 2011). Shames is the author of two dozen zines and self-published books. Shames wrote and directed two videos: Friends of the Children and Children of Northern Uganda.

Shames is represented in the United States by Steven Kasher in New York City. Shames is represented in Europe by the Galerie Esther Woerdehoff in Paris and Geneva. He is affiliated with Polaris Images photo agency in New York.

== Art Museum Permanent Collections & Exhibits ==
Shames’ images are in the permanent collections of 40 international museums and collection, including: the Metropolitan Museum of Art, New York; Museum of Modern Art, New York; Museum of Fine Art BostonInternational Center of Photography, New York; National Portrait Gallery, Washington, D.C.; Dolph Briscoe Center for American History at the University of Texas, Austin, Texas;Museum of Photographic Arts, San Diego; University of California's Bancroft Library, Berkeley; San Jose Museum of Art; Museum of Fine Arts, Houston; San Francisco Museum of Modern Art, San Francisco; the Schomburg Center for Research in Black Culture, New York; the National Museum of African American History and Culture, Washington, DC; and the Foundation Sindika Dokolo, Luanda, Angola.

Shames has exhibited at Arles, France; Center de la Photography de Moguins, France; Kyotographie International Photography Festival, Kyoto, Japan; Metropolitan Museum of Art; National Museum of African American History and Culture; National Portrait Gallery; Museum of Fine Arts, Boston; Centre de la photographie de Mougins, Mougins, France; Schomburg Center for Research in Black Culture; Pingyao International Photo Festival, Pingyao, China; Photo London; Paris Photo; Fondation Manuel Rivera-Ortiz in Arles; National Park Service on Alcatraz Island; Musée Nicéphore-Niépce, Chalon-sur-Saône, France; Maison de la photographie Robert Doisneau, Gentilly, France; Du Sable Museum of African American History, Chicago; International Center of Photography, New York; Oakland Museum of CA; Sam Jose Museum of Art; Aperture Foundation; CA2M Centro de Arte Dos de Mayo, Madrid, Spain; Chop Museum, National University of Mexico, Mexico City; Slavery & Justice Center, Brown University, Providence; Zimmerli Art Museum at Rutgers, New Brunswick, NJ; Bozar/Paleis voor Schone Kunsten, Brussels; and scores of other venues.

== Photographic Archive ==
All of Shames' negatives and contact sheets, notes, and 1,000 prints are housed at the Dolph Briscoe Center for American History at the University of Texas, Austin.

== Awards & Honors ==
Steve received the Kodak Crystal Eagle Award for Impact in Photojournalism, and awards from Leica, International Center of Photography, Robert F. Kennedy Journalism Awards, World Press, and the New York Art Director's Club, American Photo / Pop Photo named Shames one of the 15 most underrated masters of photography.

== Child poverty work ==
From 1984 to 1989, with support from the Children's Defense Fund and the Alicia Patterson Foundation, Shames traveled across America photographing the lives of the one out of five children in the United States who live below the poverty line. The photographs were published by Aperture in 1991 as Outside the Dream with an introduction by Jonathan Kozol. Shames' work documenting child poverty was also featured in the New York Times, as well as the Los Angeles Times.

Senator Bill Bradley said about the work: “Just as Walker Evans’ photographs helped America see the poverty of Appalachia, the vivid images in Outside the Dream will open our hearts to the deprivation that today afflicts not a region, but an entire generation.” In 1993, copies of Outside the Dream were distributed to every member of Congress, the governors of all 50 states, selected state legislators, and the chief executive officers of the Fortune 500 companies.

From 1994 to 1996, with support from the Ford Foundation and the Charles Stewart Mott Foundation, Shames worked on a follow-up project to Outside the Dream that focused on community solutions to child poverty in America. The work was published in 1997 as Pursuing the Dream: What Helps Children and Their Families Succeed and includes a preface by Michael Jordan. Shames traveled across America documenting families participating in neighborhood programs where parents were empowered to learn the skills they needed to become better parents, get better jobs, and become role models for their children. President Jimmy Carter wrote about the book: “Stephen Shames has captured the spirit of thousands of programs across our country that are quietly but stubbornly making the lives of children and families better in spite of the bleak circumstances in which they live. … This book can inspire all of us to seek out the many opportunities already available in their own communities to make a difference in the lives of others.”

== Other Photography Projects ==
- Homicide in Houston, a look a gun violence(1991, 1992,1994) was made possible with an assigmnment from Texas Monthly and a grant from the NPPA.
- The Troubles in Northern Ireland for Rolling Stone (1971)
- Civil War in Lebanon (1976, 1980)
- Child Hustlers in Times Square for Stern Magazine (1979 -1981)
- Street Kids & Runaways in Romania, Brazil, India, Bangladesh, The Philippines, Honduras, and the United States.
- Dads in low income communities for the Annie E. Casey Foundation.
- Child Soldiers in Lebanon and Africa.
- Child labor in India, Bangladesh, The Philippines, Brazil, the United States, Dominican Republic, Israel, Mexico, Romania, Vietnam, Egypt, Ethiopia, and Greece.
- AIDS orphans in Africa,
- Juveniles in Jail in Colorado, Tennessee, Minnesota, Texas, Wyoming, Brazil, Romania, and The Philippines.

== Humanitarian work in Africa ==
In 2006, Shames founded an NGO in Africa that locates forgotten children (AIDS orphans, former child soldiers, child laborers, and children living in internally displaced person camps) and molds them into leaders by sending them to the best schools and colleges. One of the students was highlighted in a People magazine feature in 2007. In 2012, Shames retired as executive director and returned to photography full-time.

== Film & Video ==
- Friends of the Children. Wrote and directed 12-minute film about an intensive mentoring program. Shown at the Metropolitan Museum of Art and the Brooklyn Museum. Awards: Rochester & Columbus Film Festivals.
- Steve's photos featured in Stanley Nelson's The Black Panthers and Free Angela.
- Directed a series of ten, short films about African children who transformed their lives: AIDS orphans, child soldiers and the first poor orphan ever elected head boy of an elite primary school.

== Fellowships & Grants ==
Purpose Prize Fellow (2010), Annie E. Casey Foundation (2001), EZ / EC Foundation Consortium (1999), The Ford Foundation, Charles Stewart Mott Foundation, Eastman Kodak, Canon USA, Leica, and Pennsylvania Council of the Arts (1994–96), NPPA - Nikon Documentary Sabbatical Grant (1992), Homeless in America Photographic Project (1987), Alicia Patterson Foundation Fellowship (1985).

== Current Work ==
Shames is working on exhibitions and books highlighting his previous work including the 1960s, children & youth, and a retrospective.

In 2018, Shames produced The Water Bottle Project, a set of 42 glass water bottles with photographs on the labels. The idea of the Water Bottle Project is to create an art object that will remind us of the importance of water to our lives and the life of our planet. Labels featuring photographs of water use around the world on water bottles contrast images of water use with bottled water as an expensive commodity.

In 2024 Steve has exhibits at the Museum of Fine Arts, Boston and the Centre de la photographie de Mougins, Mougins, France. This exhibit is featured at Arles.

Kehrer Verlag is publishing Steve's retrospective (out Fall, 2024)

== Books ==
- "Youth" (Dashwood, 2023)
- "Comrade Sisters: Women of the Black Panther Party" (ACC Art Books, 2022)
- "Power to the People: The World of the Black Panthers" (Abrams, 2016)
- "Bronx Boys" (University of Texas, 2014)
- "Bronx Boys" (FotoEvidence e-book)
- "Outside the Dream" (Aperture, 1991)
- "Pursuing the Dream" (Aperture, 1997)
- "The Black Panthers" (Aperture, 2006)
- "Stephen Shames: Une Retrospective" (Maison de la Photographie Robert Doisneu de Gentilly | Red Eye, 2017);
- "Facing Race" (Moravian College)
- "Transforming Lives" (Star Bright Books)
- "Free to Grow" (Columbia University)

== Self-Published Books ==
Stephen Hawking, Free Angela, We Are America, I Like You Too, Some People, 9/11, from the 4 corners of the earth

== Zines ==
Water, Street Kids & Runaways, Women, Street Life Brazil, Street Kids All, The Beach Brazil, Baby Cat, Black Lives Matter, Kids in Jail United States, Girls, Child Labor, US – Mexico Border, Jews of India, Collages

== See also ==
- List of artists from Brooklyn
