= Michael Anthony Pegues =

American painter

- Born: Michael Anthony Pegues; May 11, 1962 (age 64); Brooklyn, New York City, U.S.
- Occupations: Artist, Designer

Michael Anthony Pegues (born May 11, 1962) is an African American visual artist living in New York City.

== Early life and education ==
Pegues was born in Brooklyn, on May 11, 1963. His mother's family from Liberia, and his father's family is from Portugal. He attended alternative High School Redirection in Brownsville, Brooklyn, and later Nassau Community College, in Garden City, New York, on Long Island.

== Career ==
Self-taught, modern-day Fauve, Expressionist as well as Pop artist, contemporary of Andy Warhol, Jean-Michel Basquiat, Keith Haring, his work is strongly influenced by Hip Hop and Graffiti. Pegues had his first major solo and retrospective show at the FB Gallery in New York in 2012, "Prince Michael's Neverland: The Measure of an Artist: Michael Anthony Pegues," May 16 – June 3. His work was exhibited in Italy, his first solo show abroad, in 2014 at Le 4 Pareti: galleria d'arte, Napoli, April 5–17. His acrylic canvases, sculptures and assemblages have also been exhibited in New York at Aurora Gallery, Chelsea (under the graffiti tag Mazike), Jonathan Shorr Gallery, Soho, the New York Public Library, and Macy's Department Stores among other places.

He has collaborated with the artist Cinthus (a.k.a. Martin H.Leff-Cinthus) and the writer Tom Mathew, illustrating the latter's children's book The Magic Rug: A Christmas Story (Staten Island, New York: Trademark Universal, Inc., 2010).

A prominent figure in the downtown art scene, he frequently attends gallery openings, receptions, fundraisers and other social functions, and has been photographed by the likes of nightlife photographer Patrick McMullan, Bill Farrell, Cojo "Art Juggernaut", and society photographer Annie Watt.
