= Joel W. Solomon Federal Building and United States Courthouse =

- U.S. Post Office
- U.S. National Register of Historic Places

- Location within Tennessee Location within the United States
- Location: 900 Georgia Ave., Chattanooga, Tennessee
- Coordinates: 35°2′42″N 85°18′30″W
- Area: 1.7 acres (0.69 ha)
- Built: 1932
- Architect: Shreve, Lamb and Harmon; Hunt, Reuben Harrison
- Architectural style: Art Deco
- MPS: Hunt, Reuben H., Buildings in Hamilton County TR
- NRHP reference No.: 80003827
- Added to NRHP: February 29, 1980

The Joel W. Solomon Federal Building and United States Courthouse, commonly referred to as the Solomon Building, is a historic post office and courthouse located at Chattanooga, Tennessee in Hamilton County, Tennessee. The courthouse serves the United States District Court for the Eastern District of Tennessee. The building is listed on the National Register of Historic Places as U.S. Post Office. It was designed by Shreve, Lamb and Harmon and Reuben Harrison Hunt with watercolor murals by Hilton Leech.

== Building history ==
The Joel W. Solomon Federal Building and U.S. Courthouse was constructed in 1932–1933 as the U.S. Post Office and Courthouse. Designed jointly by Shreve, Lamb and Harmon and Reuben Harrison Hunt (1862–1937), it was Hunt's last major work, coming at the end of a career that spanned more than five decades. Hunt designed every major public building constructed in Chattanooga between 1895 and 1935. He was also the architect of local churches, hospitals, and private office buildings, as well as similar public and private buildings throughout the South.

Chattanooga's Post Office and Courthouse was built as part of an expanded federal construction program, undertaken in the 1930s under the direction of Supervising Architect Louis A. Simon. This program resulted in the construction of new post offices and courthouses throughout the United States and provided employment to many architects, engineers, artists, and construction workers. The Post Office and Courthouse cost approximately $493,000.

In 1938 the building was recognized by the American Institute of Architects as one of the 150 finest buildings constructed in the previous twenty years in the United States, and it was featured in an AIA photographic exhibit in America and Europe.

Prominent U.S. District Court cases have been heard in the building. In 1960 the filing of a major civil rights lawsuit, Mapp et al. vs. the City of Chattanooga Board of Education, initiated the desegregation of the city's public schools. It was also the site of Jimmy Hoffa's 1964 conviction for jury tampering.

The U.S. Post Office and Courthouse was added to the National Register of Historic Places in 1980, as part of a thematic nomination of the most significant buildings of Reuben Harrison Hunt.

The General Services Administration assumed ownership of the building in 1981 and renamed it in honor of Joel "Jay" W. Solomon, a Chattanooga native and Administrator of GSA from 1977 to 1979. The main Chattanooga Post Office has relocated, but the building still houses federal courts and offices.

== Architecture ==
The Joel W. Solomon Federal Building and U.S. Court-house stands in the central business district of Chattanooga. Facing Georgia Avenue and across from Miller Park, it occupies half a city block. The building is a notable example of the Art Moderne style as employed for government buildings in the 1930s. The form and details recall the classicism of earlier government architecture but take a stylized form here seen in sleek lines, a vertical emphasis, and plant, animal, and geometric decorative motifs. Several of the motifs, such as eagles and stars, evoke patriotic associations that are particularly appropriate for a federal building. The five-story building has a steel structure clad in white marble. Two penthouses are set on projecting towers at the northwest and southwest corners.

On the west (main) elevation, end pavilions project from the towers. These flank a 13-bay central section with 13 three-story windows groups, recessed behind marble pilasters with fluted inner panels. A banded beltcourse running between the fourth floor and the parapet features a pattern of stars and eagles carved in low relief.

The building's main entrances are set in the end pavilions. These are approached by wide steps of granite, with tiered cheek walls. Both upper cheek walls have stylized eagles carved into their corners. In each pavilion the paired and single entrance doors are surmounted by a curving window bay that rises four stories. Both are flanked by angled reveals, adorned with alternating fluted segments and foliate-motif plaques.

The rear of the building is dominated by a five-story central section, flanked by one-story pavilions built to house the post office work floors. Carved panels above the window bays feature stylized eagles and shields.

The building has elegant interior features and finishes consistent with the Art Moderne style while incorporating motifs suitable for a federal building. The entrance foyers and the lobby have their original chandeliers and marble walls and inlaid marble floors in chevron and star patterns. The lobby ceiling is bordered with bands set with stars. The entry foyer ceilings take the form of shallow domes set with a stylized star pattern. The lobby contains the original postal sales windows with ornate aluminum grilles and fittings, as well as original postal counters. Dark-veined marble staircases with ornate metal railings lead to the upper stories from the entrance foyers. The Mail Carrier, a cast-aluminum sculpture by Leopold Scholz, was installed in the postal lobby in 1938.

The ceremonial courtroom is located on the third story. The courtroom lobby has marble walls and a terrazzo floor with an inlaid seal of justice. The courtroom is paneled in oak enhanced by decorative aluminum grilles. The judge's bench is a masterpiece of cabinetry. A mural called "Allegory in Chattanooga" curves behind the judge's bench. Installed in 1937, it was painted by Hilton Leech under the auspices of the Treasury Department's Section of Painting and Sculpture. The mural illustrates the history of the city through the New Deal era and includes a transmission tower symbolizing the Tennessee Valley Authority (TVA), headquartered in Chattanooga from its inception in 1935.

== Significant events ==
- 1932–33: The Federal Building and Courthouse is constructed at an approximate cost of $493,000.
- 1938: The building is named one of the 150 best modern buildings (built since 1918) in the United States by the American Institute of Architects.
- 1960: A civil rights lawsuit is filed in Federal District Court initiating a court-ordered desegregation plan for Chattanooga's public school system.
- 1964: In one of the courthouse's most notorious trials, Jimmy Hoffa is convicted of jury tampering.
- 1980: Listed on the National Register of Historic Places as part of nomination focusing on buildings of Chattanooga architect Reuben Harrison Hunt.
- 1981: The U.S. General Services Administration acquires the building and renames it for former GSA Administrator Joel W. Solomon.

== Building facts ==
- Architect: Reuben Harrison Hunt
- Construction Dates: 1932–1933
- Landmark Status: Listed on the National Register of Historic Places
- Location: 10th Street and Georgia Avenue
- Architectural Style: Art Moderne
- Primary Materials: White marble with aluminum details
- Prominent Features: Projecting entrance pavilions with carved eagles; courtroom mural by Hilton Leech, entitled "Allegory in Chattanooga"
