= Marion Greenwood =

American artist (1909–1970)

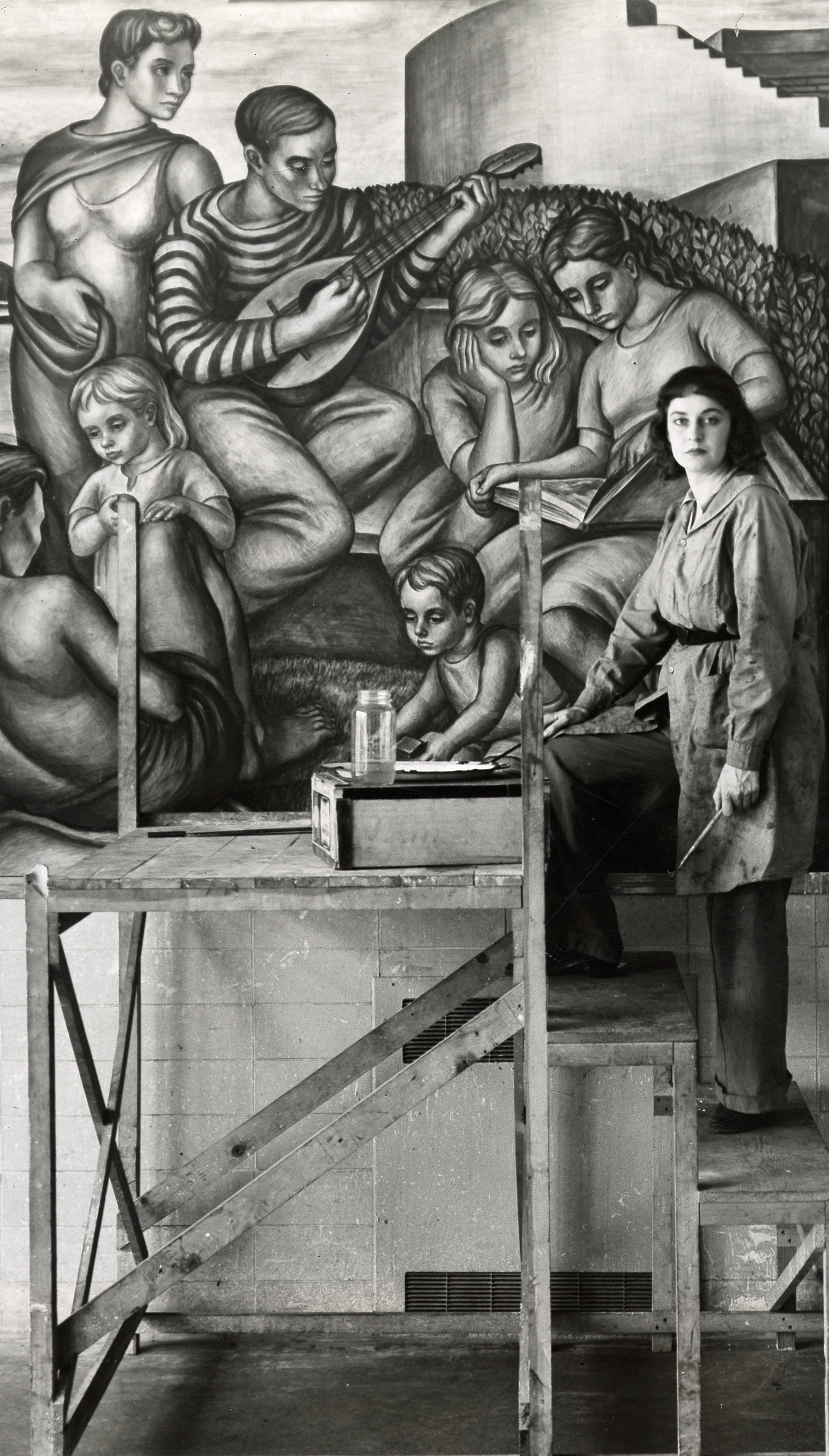
- Marion Greenwood, 1940
- Born: Marion Kathryn Greenwood; April 6, 1909; Brooklyn, New York, U.S.
- Died: February 20, 1970 (aged 60); Kingston, New York, U.S.
- Education: Art Students League of New York, Académie Colarossi
- Known for: murals, painting, printmaking
- Movement: Social Realism
- Spouse: Charles Fenn (June 4, 1937–1950, divorce)
- Partner: Robert Plate (1950–1970, death)
- Parents: Walter Greenwood (father); Kathryn Boyland (mother)
- Relatives: Grace Greenwood Ames (sister)

Marion Kathryn Greenwood (April 6, 1909 – August 20, 1970) was an American social realist artist who became popular starting in the 1920s and became renowned in both the United States and Mexico. She is most well known for her murals, but she also practiced easel painting, printmaking, and frescoes.

She traveled to Mexico, Hong Kong, Burma, and India, depicting peoples of different cultures and ethnicities and paying special attention to oppressed people in underdeveloped locations, which has at times resulted in critical reception in the modern-era due to issues of ethnic and racial stereotypes.

== Early life and education ==
Marion Greenwood was born in Brooklyn, New York in 1909, to Walter Greenwood and Kathryn Boyland. She was the second daughter and last of six children. Her father was a painter and her older sister, Grace Greenwood Ames, was also an artist.

She exhibited artistic talent at a very young age and left high school at the age of fifteen to study with a scholarship at the Art Students League of New York. There she studied with painters John Sloan and George Bridgman. She also studied lithography with Emil Ganso and mosaic with Alexander Archipenko.

At age eighteen, she made multiple visits to Yaddo in Saratoga Springs, New York. There, she painted portraits of intellectuals-in-residence and gained experience and knowledge through conversation. In the mid-1920s, Greenwood studied with Winold Reiss, a German-born artist and designer who had contributed to the Harlem Renaissance movement. In 1929, both of the Greenwood sisters participated in the famed Bohemian event, the Maverick Festival (1915–1931) at the Maverick Art Colony in Woodstock, New York.

Still in her teens, Greenwood used the proceeds from a portrait of a wealthy financier to begin her travels through Europe. While she was there she studied at the Academie Colarossi in Paris.

== Career ==
She returned to New York in 1930, but continued to travel extensively over the next four decades, mostly throughout the United States, Mexico, and China. In her work she employed multiple mediums: oil paint, fresco, lithography, etching, charcoal, and ink.

Her first trip to the Southwest began a theme in her work which involved depicting ethnicity and culture in different parts of the world. As she visited different locales throughout her life, Greenwood would spend time learning about the people there and use them as subjects for drawings and paintings. When creating large murals later on, Greenwood would often use these studies to place figures in a larger composition.

=== Mexico ===
The first visit to Taxco, Mexico in 1932 marked a crucial turning point in her career, as she began to work on fresco murals for the Mexican government. Between 1933 and 1936, Greenwood and her sister painted five separate murals in Taxco and Morelia, Mexico. Her older sister Grace served as her painting assistant while working in Mexico.

There she met the artist Pablo O'Higgins, who introduced and taught her fresco painting. As a result, she began focusing her efforts on fresco-mural painting. Greenwood's first fresco mural was Mercado en Taxco (1933), located in the stairwell in the Hotel Taxqueño in Guerrero.

The success of this piece led to commissions from the Universidad Michoacana de San Nicolás de Hidalgo in Morelia, and the Abelardo L. Rodriguez Market in the historic center of Mexico City. An example of her process is evident in the preparation for the decoration at Universidad Michoacana de San Nicolás de Hidalgo in Morelia, Greenwood spent a year studying and immersing herself in the Purépecha Indians culture before completing this project.

Her work during her Mexican mural period had revolutionary themes and was influenced by the stylization of José Clemente Orozco and Diego Rivera in its figures and dynamic compositions.

=== Commissions, murals, and other work ===
Greenwood was the first woman to receive a mural commission from a foreign government. Shortly after these projects, she returned to the United States to create a mural for the social hall of the Westfield Acres Housing Project in Camden, New Jersey. In 1937 she was hired to teach fresco painting at Columbia University, and a year later was commissioned by the Section of Fine Arts to paint an oil mural, The Partnership of Man and Nature for the post office in Crossville, Tennessee.

Greenwood's murals were often large dramatic scenes with groups of people engaged in cultural practices or in the case of a social works project, workers in their environment. Often the murals had themes of optimism, democracy, and diversity. For example, Rehearsal for African Ballet depicts a group of African-Americans playing music, singing, and dancing together. In Blueprint for the Living, workers are laying bricks and building while a family looks upon the construction.

In 1937, she married British-born Charles Fenn.

In 1940, she was commissioned by the Federal Art Project to paint frescoes for the Red Hook housing project in Brooklyn. This project, titled Blueprint for Living, was meant for low-income citizens in government housing and expressed optimism for a more harmonious future. Around 1940, Greenwood began to focus on easel painting and printmaking, generally depicting powerful, gritty scenes of working classes or insightful portraits. The subjects from the 1940s work were mainly portraits of people, often lower class individuals toiling in work or squalor from foreign regions as well as in America. Greenwood was applauded by critics for "her profound sympathy with the poor and the oppressed of all lands, her natural democratic feeling" and "her disregard of difficulties and class barriers". She was seen as an advocate for these struggling figures in the same way that she supported social movements with her social realist murals.

=== World War II ===
At the start of World War II (1939–1945), Greenwood was one of only two women appointed as an artist war-correspondent with the World War II United States Army Art Program. During this time she painted the reconditioning of wounded soldiers. This sometimes involved being present at surgeries to sketch and following the patient through to occupational therapy. The paintings, drawings, and etchings from this series are in the official archives of the United States War Department. Abbott Laboratories, the pharmaceutical company helped fund aspects of the program.

=== Hong Kong ===
In spring 1946, she traveled with her husband Charles Fenn to live and work in Hong Kong, with a journey stopover in London, Burma, and India. Fenn had lived in Hong Kong prior to World War II and was starting a job with the United States Marines for the Office of Strategic Services, and at this time, Hong Kong was heavily influenced by British colonists. Greenwood's travels included a four-day trip to Guangzhou (formally known as Canton), China and a weekend trip to Macau. She returned to New York City by herself in June 1947. In December 1947, she made her solo debut with art pieces from her stay in Hong Kong at the Associated American Artists (AAA) gallery in New York City, and another art exhibition was held in March 1948. Greenwood and Fenn divorced in early 1950.

=== Knoxville mural ===
In 1954, Greenwood received a large commission for a 6-by-29-foot oil-on-linen mural, "The History of Tennessee" nicknamed "The Singing Mural", in the University Center student center auditorium at the University of Tennessee in Knoxville. Greenwood taught art courses at the university while she worked as an artist-in-residence on the mural, which took a year to complete.

The mural was designed to depicted the folk traditions and music of Tennessee. There are four thematic sections to the mural. When the painting was completed and unveiled in June 1955, it was vandalized, hidden, and debated mostly due to images that have been perceived as of racial stereotyping. One of the panels showed an adult black man farming cotton; it is unclear from the mural if he is being depicted as a slave, a sharecropper or a farmer.

In 1972, the mural was hidden away and covered with paneling. In 2006 the mural was uncovered due to the student's requests and the “Greenwood Mural Project” was formed on campus to discuss censorship and race. In 2013, the University Center building that held the mural was removed and the mural was restored and put into storage. The mural was put on public view at the Knoxville Museum of Art in 2014 as part of the permanent exhibit "Higher Ground", which focuses on art in East Tennessee.

== Later life ==
She was exhibited in numerous solo shows at the American Contemporary Artists Gallery in New York City. She also exhibited her work at the Corcoran Gallery of Art, the Whitney Museum of American Art, the Museum of Modern Art, and the New York World's Fair.

Her last mural was made in 1965 at Syracuse University, this mural was dedicated to women of the world and combined drawings and paintings from her studies and world travels. At the end of her life she lived in Woodstock, New York with her partner Robert Plate.

She died on August 20, 1970, in Kingston, New York after a long illness and a cerebral hemorrhage.

== Art collections ==
Her works are represented in the public art collections of the Metropolitan Museum of Art (the Met), the Library of Congress, New York Public Library (NYPL), Smithsonian American Art Museum, National Gallery of Art, Hirshhorn Museum and Sculpture Garden, National Museum of Women in the Arts, Currier Museum of Art, Fine Arts Museums of San Francisco (FAMSF), Indianapolis Museum of Art, Cleveland Museum of Art, Wichita Art Museum (WAM), Maier Museum of Art, Albrecht-Kemper Museum of Art amongst others.

Her work is also in the private collections of Maurice Wertheim, Joseph Hirshhorn, and Marc Sandler.

== Awards ==
- 1944 – Second Prize for Painting In The United States, at the Carnegie Museum of Art, for the painting, Mississippi Girl (1943)
- 1946 – Lithography Prize from John Herron Art Institute
- 1951 – First Walter Lippincott Prize at Pennsylvania Academy of Fine Arts
- 1952 – First Altman Prize for figure drawing from the 127th Annual National Academy of Design
- 1956 – Second Purchase Prize at the Butler Institute of American Art, for the painting, Elegy
- 1959 – The Grumbacher Prize from the National Association of Women Artists (NAWA)
- 1959 – Election to the National Academy of Design organization.

== Image gallery ==
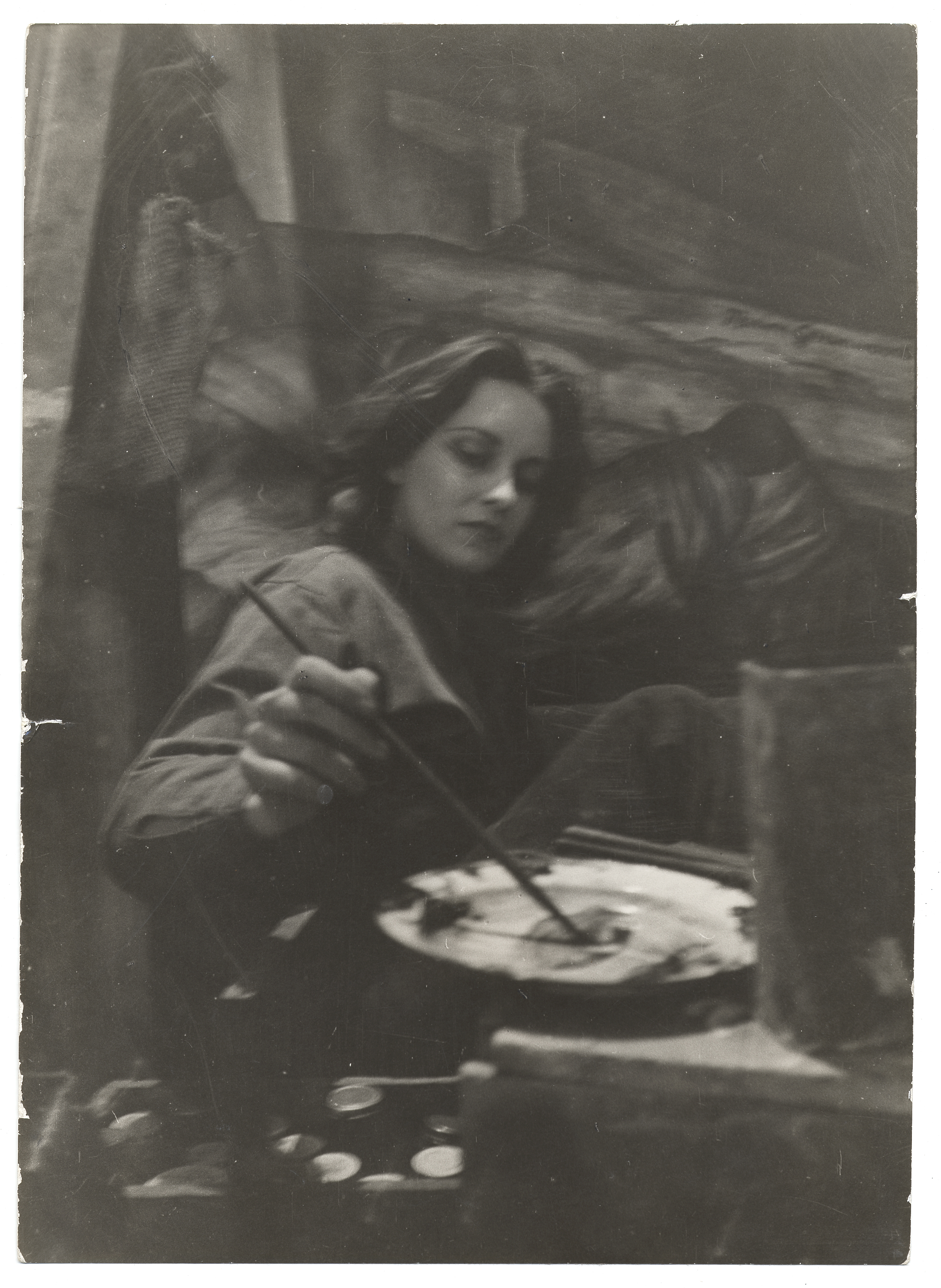
Greenwood painting fresco murals at Abelardo Rodriguez Market, Mexico City, 1936

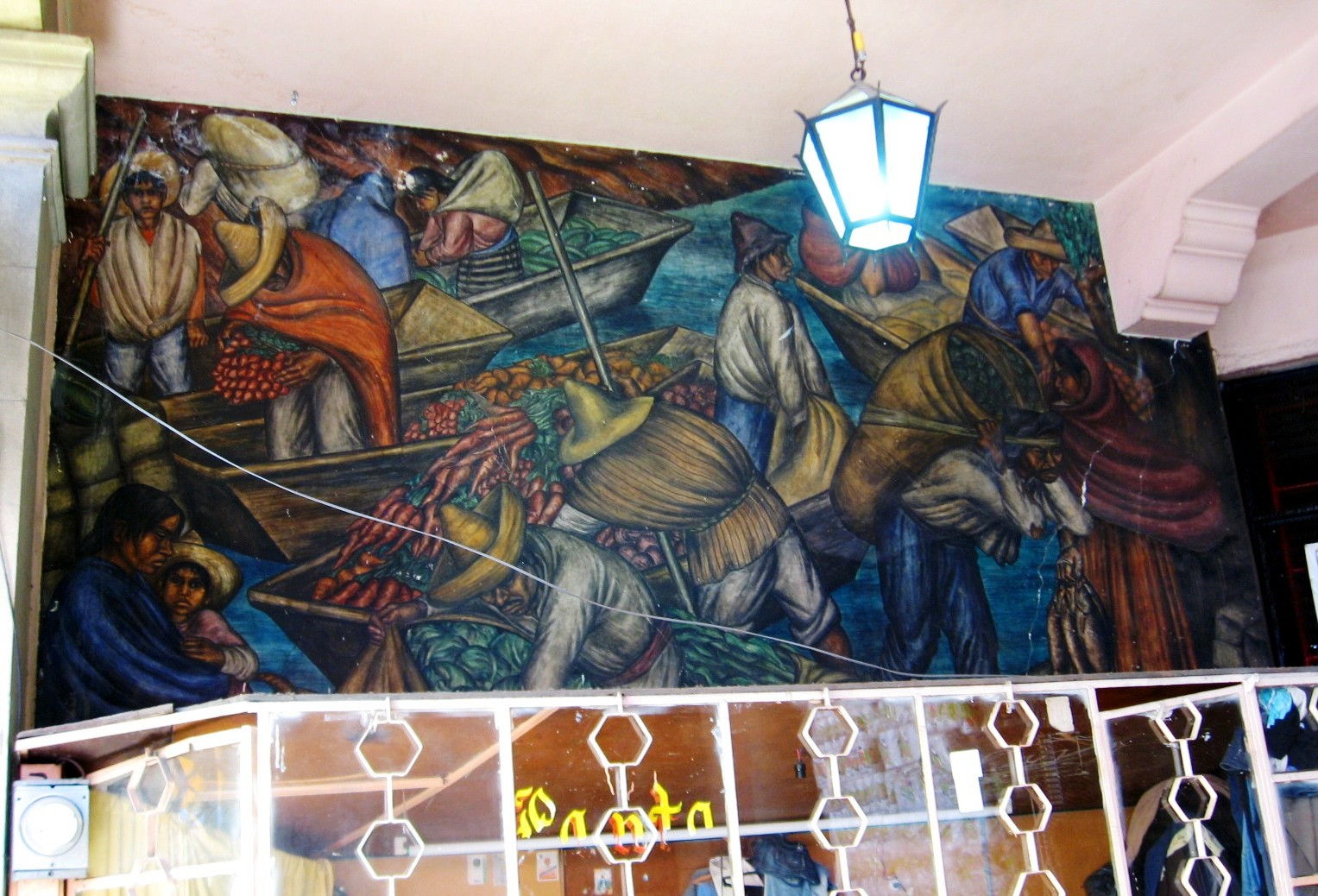
Abelardo Rodriguez Market, Mexico City

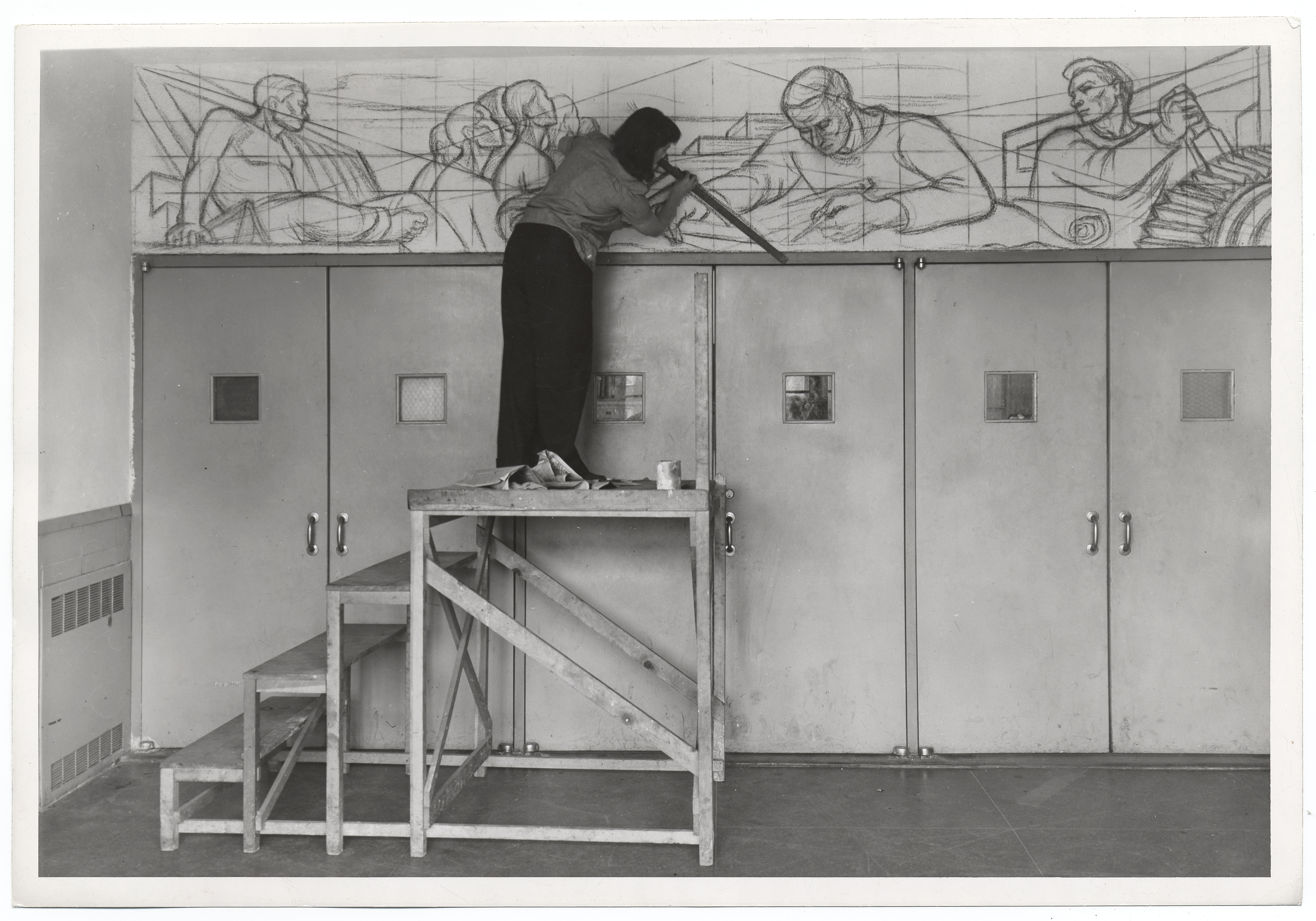
Mural at Red Hook housing project

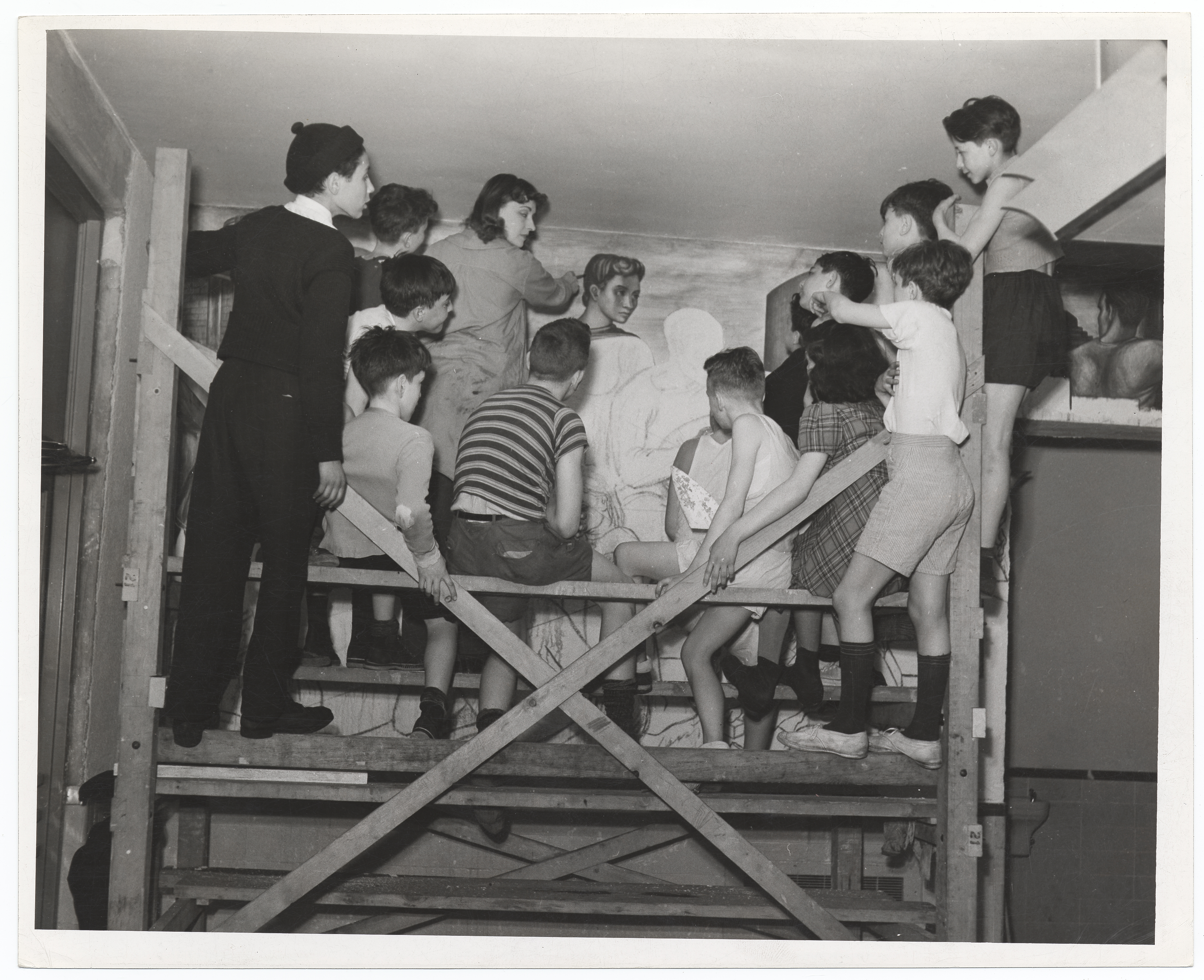
Red Hook children on scaffolding with the artist

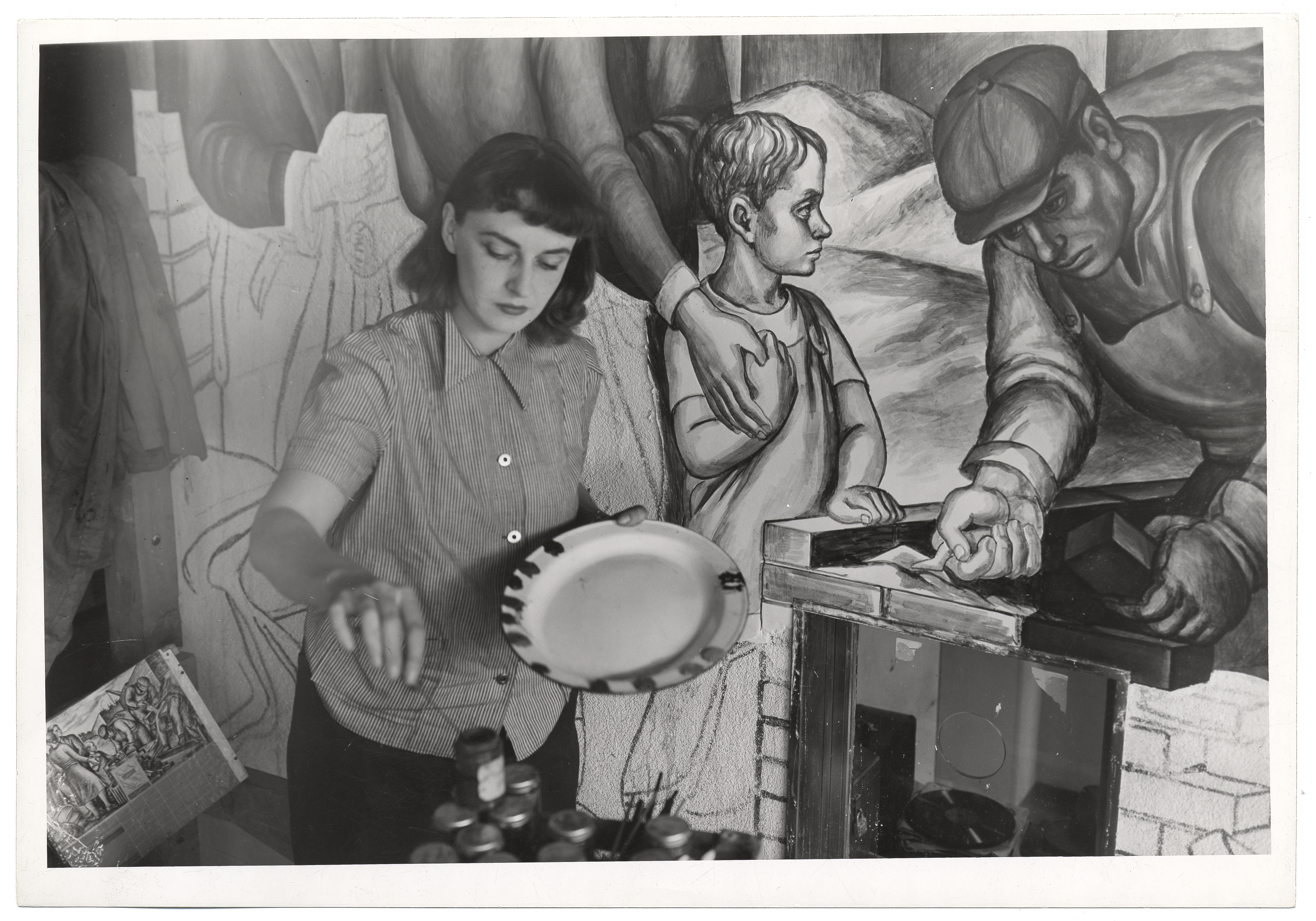
Marion Greenwood (1940) painting a WPA Federal Art Project.

== See also ==
- List of artists from Brooklyn
