= Hilton Leech House and Amagansett Art School =

Historic house in Florida, United States

- U.S. National Register of Historic Places
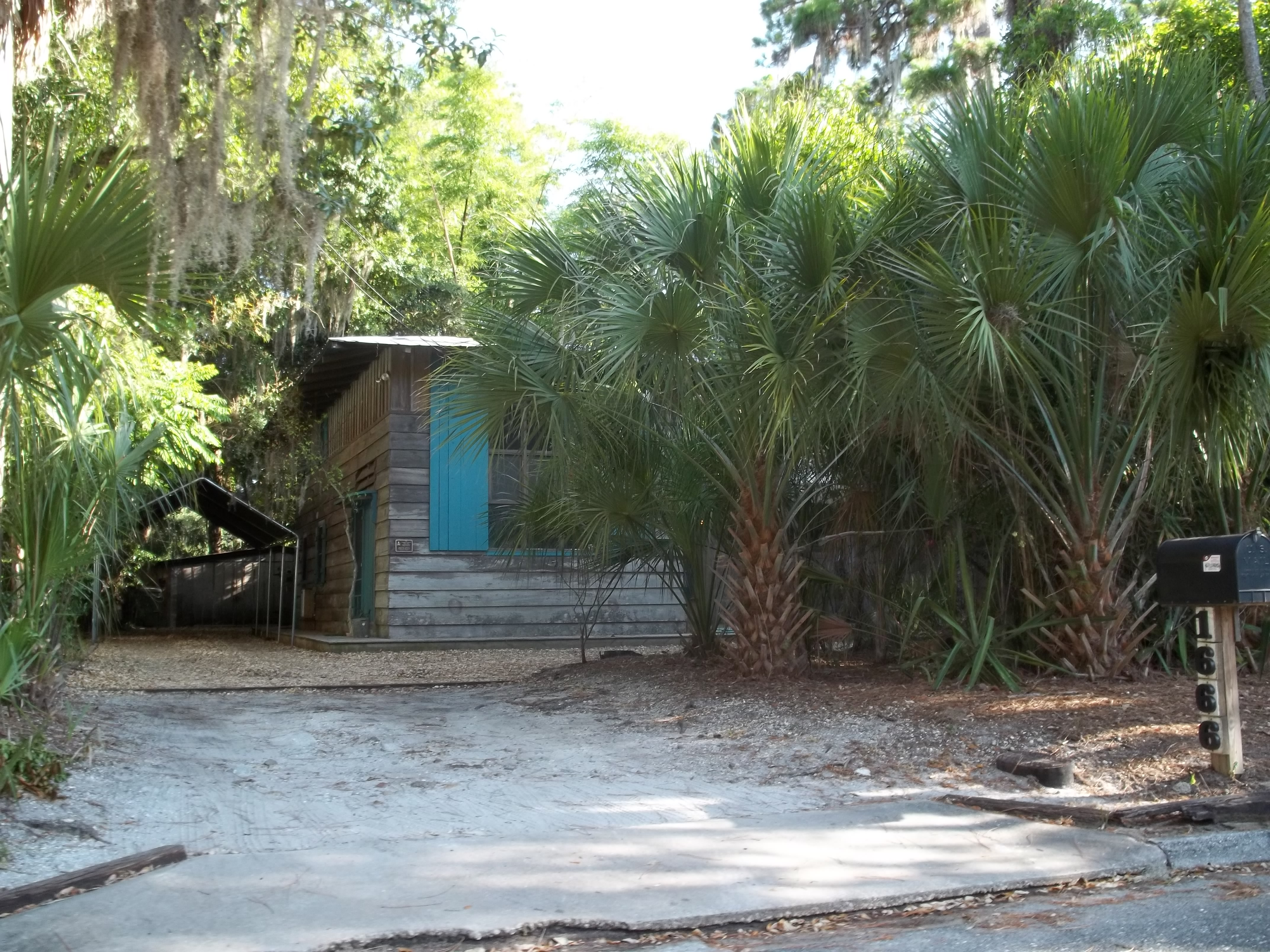

- Location within Florida Location within the United States
- Location: Sarasota, Florida
- Coordinates: 27°18′59″N 82°32′10″W
- NRHP reference No.: 95000732
- Added to NRHP: June 22, 1995

The Hilton Leech House and Amagansett Art School is a historic school in Sarasota, Florida. Named for artist Hilton Leech (Born in Bridgeport, Connecticut in 1906 - Died in Virginia City, Montana 1969), it is located at 1666 Hillview Street. On June 22, 1995, it was added to the U.S. National Register of Historic Places.

Leech taught painting at the Ringling School of Art from 1931 until 1936 and again from 1939 until 1945. After World War II he opened his own school the Amagansett Art School at 1666 Hillview Street in Sarasota. Leech painted watercolor murals at the Joel W. Solomon Federal Building and United States Courthouse, a building listed on the National Register of Historic Places. The mural is titled Allegory of Chattanooga (1937). He also painted Removal of the County Seat from Daphne to Bay Minette (1939) at the U.S. Post Office in Bay Minette, Alabama from a commission by the Treasury Department's Section of Painting and Sculpture.

== Other works ==
- Montauk Harbor (circa 1940)
