= Fred Bendheim =

American artist

- Born: 1956 (age 69–70); Phoenix, Arizona, U.S.
- Education: Pomona College; University of California, Davis
- Known for: Painting, sculpture, public art
- Website: www.fredbendheim.com

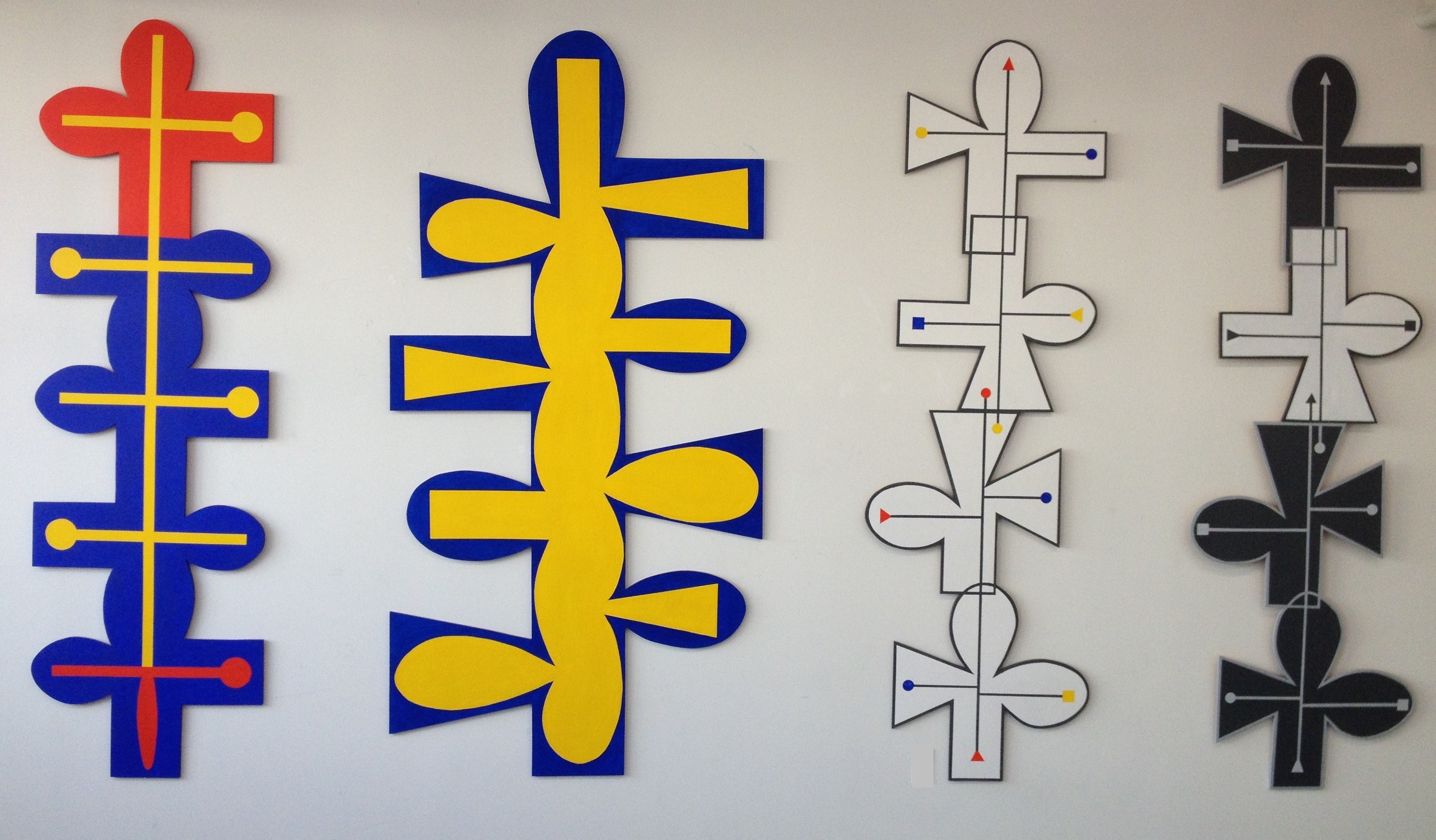
“Totems”, shaped paintings by Fred Bendheim

Fred Bendheim (born 1956) is an American visual artist known for his abstract shaped paintings, public commissions, and involvement in community arts education. Based in Brooklyn, New York, Bendheim's work spans painting, sculpture, installation, and water-based media, often exploring themes of nature, abstraction, and spirituality. His work has been exhibited in the United States and internationally, and is held in the collections of institutions including the Montclair Art Museum, the Scottsdale Museum of Contemporary Art, and the Galería Nacional de Costa Rica.

== Early life and education ==
Fred Bendheim was born in Phoenix, Arizona, in 1956. He studied at the University of California, Davis before receiving his B.A. cum laude in studio art from Pomona College in 1978. At Pomona, he studied with artists such as Karl Benjamin and Joseph Piasentin. Early in his career, he contributed to projects involving the integration of art and architecture, including collaborations on fountains and murals for Frank Lloyd Wright-designed buildings in Arizona.

== Career ==
Bendheim has worked across a variety of media including shaped canvas painting, installations, public art, and mixed-media constructions. He often emphasizes formal abstraction while incorporating metaphysical and natural motifs. His work gained early visibility with exhibitions in New York City in the 1980s and 1990s, such as at the Arsenal Gallery in Central Park and Chuck Levitan Gallery. He moved to New York City in 1984.

In 2023, Bendheim's work was the subject of The Elements at 440 Gallery, Brooklyn. His shaped paintings, featured in the 2018 exhibition "Between the Color" at Site:Brooklyn, were described in The Brooklyn Rail as "colorful, delicate, even lyrical," and noted for challenging the viewer's expectations of dimensionality and abstraction.

He has also completed numerous site-specific commissions, including a 2019 dual mural project at Industry City in Brooklyn titled Creationism/Evolution, covered by ArtDaily, and Song for Harlem, commissioned by Chashama in 2013.

In 2024, he was profiled in the Brooklyn Downtown Star, where he discussed the philosophy and technique behind his shaped paintings and his collaborative mural work. The New York Times praised his work in 2025 writing, "Thrillingly, Bendheim has made a tornado stand still"... calling his work "charming".

== Public commissions ==
Bendheim's public artworks include:

- Creationism/Evolution, murals at Industry City, Brooklyn (2019)
- Tao, a water sculpture for the Beatitudes Campus, Phoenix, AZ (2016)
- Site-specific paintings for the Waldorf-Astoria, Ritz-Carlton, and Mandarin Hotels
- Fountain-sculptures for Frank Lloyd Wright's San Marcos and Pottery House residences in Arizona

== Teaching and residencies ==
Bendheim has taught at The Art Students League of New York and the College of Mount Saint Vincent. He has worked extensively as a teaching artist with Young Audiences of New York. He held artist residencies at the Julia and David White Artists' Colony in Costa Rica (2001, 2003, 2006) and was featured on the Brooklyn Public Library's 2018 documentary series Created In Brooklyn.

== Collections ==
His work is held in numerous public and private collections, including:

- The Montclair Art Museum
- Scottsdale Museum of Contemporary Art
- Galería Nacional, Costa Rica
- South Korea Ministry of Culture

== Publications and media ==
Bendheim's paintings have been featured in The Lancet (2000–2002), Pomona College Magazine (1999), and the Costa Rican journal El Centrocostarricense (2012). He was interviewed by Entertainment Vine and featured in the book Created in Brooklyn (2024) by Randy Duchaine.

== Selected bibliography ==
- Colón, John Michael. "Some Roads Yet Untraveled in Abstraction," The Brooklyn Rail, March 2018.
- Meehan, Meagan J. "Vibe And Vibrancy: Interview with Artist Fred Bendheim," Brooklyn Star, Feb. 14, 2024.
- Duchaine, Randy. Created in Brooklyn, DCI Press, 2024.
- "Diversos Papeles, Diversas Pinturas," El Centrocostarricense, 2012.
- "Arsenal Gallery Exhibits 'Paintings'," Antiques and The Arts Weekly, October 1992.
