= Grace Greenwood Ames =

American artist

- Born: Grace Greenwood; January 15, 1902; New York City, U.S.
- Died: July 21, 1979 (aged 74); New York City, U.S.
- Other names: Grace Greenwood Crampton, Grace Crampton, Grace Ames
- Education: Art Students League of New York
- Years active: 1930–1940
- Known for: Painting
- Movement: Mexican muralism, Social realism
- Spouse(s): [?] Ames, (unknown dates) Rollin Crampton (6 January 1958-?)
- Parents: Walter Greenwood (father); Kathryn Boyland (mother)
- Relatives: Marion Greenwood (sister)

Grace Greenwood Ames (born Brooklyn, January 15, 1905 – died New York City, July 21, 1979) was an American artist and social realism muralist. She worked in Mexico on murals alongside historical artists.

When she married, rather than dropping her maiden name she added her husband's surname Ames on to the end of her name, and called herself variously 'Grace Greenwood', 'Grace Ames', or (as she has become known) 'Grace Greenwood Ames'. Later in life she went by 'Grace Crampton', her second husband's last name.

== Biography ==
Grace Greenwood was born in Brooklyn, New York, on January 15, 1905, to Walter Greenwood and Kathryn Boyland. Her father was a painter and her younger sister Marion Greenwood was also an artist. Ames studied at Art Students League of New York, alongside her sister. She went on to study art in Italy in the 1920s. In 1929, both of the Greenwood sisters participated in the famed Bohemian event, the Maverick Festival (1915–1931) at the Maverick Art Colony in Woodstock, New York.

Between 1933 and 1936, Ames worked on five murals with her sister Marion, serving as her painting assistant while in Mexico. One of the murals was at the Aberlardo L. Rodríguez market in the historic center of Mexico City and the Museo Regional Michoacano, commissioned by the Universidad Michoacana de San Nicolás de Hidalgo in Morelia, Mexico. Grace Ames painted murals together with Diego Rivera, José Clemente Orozco, David Alfaro Siqueiros, Pablo O'Higgins, Leopoldo Méndez, and other well-known Mexican "muralista".

Her work includes the oil on canvas murals titled Progress of Power in the post office of Lexington, Tennessee, commissioned by the Treasury Section of Fine Arts, and completed in 1940.

Later in life Ames eventually decided not to follow an art career, instead she moved to Woodstock, New York and took her second husband's last name, going by the name Grace Crampton.

Ames work is found in public art collections including the National Gallery of Art, amongst others.

== Exhibitions ==
- 1940 – PM Competition: The Artist as Reporter, Museum of Modern Art (MoMA), New York City, New York
