= List of tallest buildings in Chattanooga =

Skyline of Chattanooga
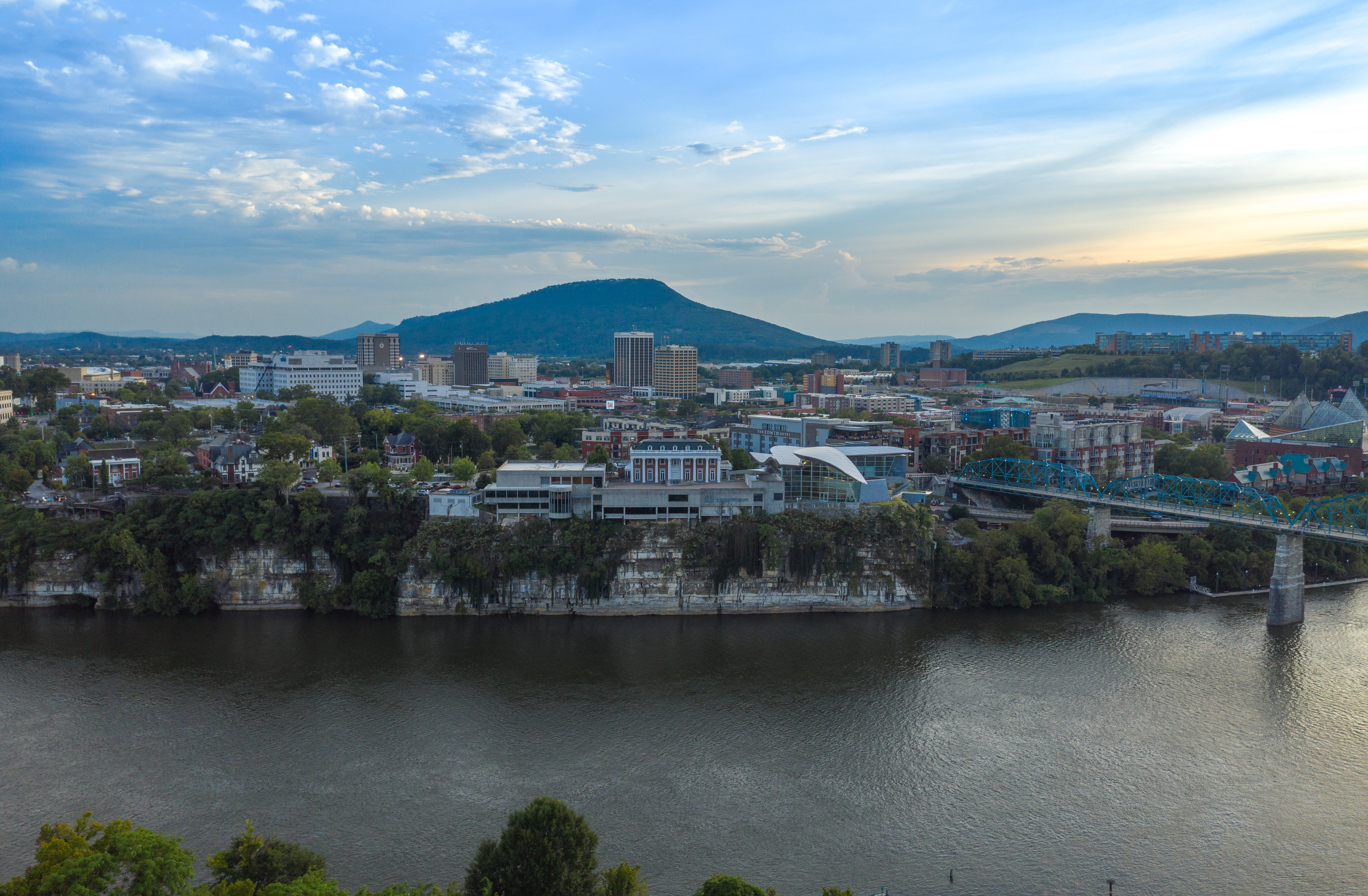
- The skyline of Chattanooga in 2018
- Population: 196,582
- Tallest building: Republic Centre (1977)
- Tallest building height: 268 ft (82 m)

Number of tall buildings
- Taller than 50 m (164 ft): 13
- Taller than 75 m (246 ft): 2

Number of tall buildings — feet
- Taller than 200 ft (61.0 m): 6

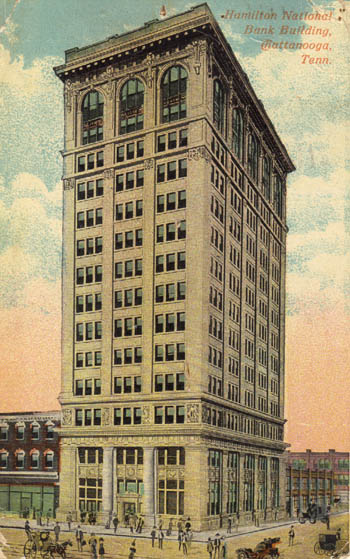
A postcard from 1917 depicts the 210 ft (64 m) tall Hamilton National Bank Building, which stood as the tallest building in Chattanooga from 1911 to 1968. (Note: Now known as the First Horizon Bank Building.) From 1965 to 1966, the building would undergo renovations, which included replacing its beaux-arts facade with a modern facade.

Chattanooga is the 4th-largest city in the U.S. state of Tennessee. As of August 2026, the city has a population of 196,582 people. The city currently has 15 buildings which stand over 150 ft (46 m) tall, and 6 buildings which stand over 200 ft (61 m) tall.

As of August 2026, the tallest building in Chattanooga is the 268 ft (82 m) tall, Republic Centre which has 21 floors and was built in 1977. The 2nd-tallest building in Chattanooga as of August 2026 is the 251 ft (77 m) tall, Truist Tower which has 20 floors and was built in 1968, it was also the tallest building in Chattanooga from 1968 to 1977. The most recently completed high-rise to stand over 150 ft (46 m) tall is the 209 ft (64 m) tall, Erlanger Baroness Hospital, which has 13 floors and was built in 1997.

== Map of tallest buildings ==
The map below shows the locations of the buildings in Chattanooga that stand over 150 ft (46 m) in height. Each marker is given a number based on the buildings ranking in the list. The color of each marker represents the decade in which the building was completed. Most of the tallest buildings in Chattanooga are located in downtown, except for the Erlanger Baroness Hospital, First Baptist Church, River View Tower, and Dogwood Manor.

Buildings in Chattanooga that stand over 150 ft (46 m).
- 1950s and before
- 1960s
- 1970s
- 1980s
- 1990s
- 2000s
- 2010s
- 2020s
1 Republic Centre
2 Truist Tower
3 Liberty Tower
4 First Horizon Bank Building
5 Erlanger Baroness Hospital
6 First Baptist Church
7 River View Tower
8 Dogwood Manor
9 James Building
10 Tallan Financial Center
11 Volunteer Life Building
12 The Maclellan
13 Chattanooga Marriott Downtown
14 Patten Towers
15 Dome Building

== Tallest buildings ==
This list ranks buildings in Chattanooga that stand at least 150 ft (46 m) tall. Spires and other architectural details are included in the height of a building, however, antennas are excluded.

Tallest building in Chattanooga upon completion

Rank	Name	Image	Location	Height	Floors	Year	Purpose	Notes	References
1	Republic Centre	Republic_Centre,_633_Chestnut_St,_Chattanooga,_TN,_37450_(cropped)	35°02′54.70″N 85°18′43.13″W	268 ft (82 m)	21	1977	Office	Tallest building in Chattanooga since 1977.	
2	Truist Tower	SunTrust_Bank_Building_Chattanooga_Skyline_2018_(cropped)	35°02′50.66″N 85°18′32.64″W	251 ft (77 m)	20	1968	Office	Formerly known as the SunTrust Bank Building and as the American National Bank Building.	
3	Liberty Tower	Liberty_Tower_and_Republic_Centre	35°02′57.59″N 85°18′43.09″W	214 ft (65 m)	17	1979	Office	Formerly known as the Chestnut Tower.	
4	First Horizon Bank Building	First_Horizon_Bank_Building_Chattanooga_Skyline_2018_(cropped)	35°02′53.66″N 85°18′35.44″W	210 ft (64 m)	17	1911	Office, Residential	It was renovated from 1965 to 1966, which included replacing its beaux-arts facade.	
5	Erlanger Baroness Hospital	Utcom123876 (cropped)	35°02′52.11″N 85°17′21.88″W	209 ft (64 m)	13	1997	Hospital	Designed by Gresham Smith and Partners.	
6	First Baptist Church	First_Baptist_Church_of_Chattanooga_(cropped)	35°03′02.60″N 85°18′54.42″W	203 ft (62 m)		1967	Religious	Tallest church in Chattanooga.	
7	River View Tower	River_View_Tower_Chattanooga_Skyline_2018_(cropped)	35°02′52.33″N 85°19′08.69″W	182 ft (55 m)	18	1974	Residential		
8=	Dogwood Manor	Dogwood Manor Chattanooga Skyline 2018 (cropped)	35°02′47.67″N 85°19′10.25″W	179 ft (55 m)	18	1974	Residential		
8=	James Building	JamesBuildingChattanooga	35°02′50.35″N 85°18′39.25″W	179 ft (55 m)	12	1907	Office	Listed on the National Register of Historic Places since 1980.	
10	Tallan Financial Center	Republic_Centre,_West_Village_parking_garage,_and_Tallan_Financial_Center,_Chattanooga,_TN_(cropped)	35°02′43.01″N 85°18′41.19″W	172 ft (52 m)	13	1982	Office		
11	Volunteer Life Building	Volunteer_Life_Building_Downtown_chattanooga_(cropped)	35°02′45.48″N 85°18′28.54″W	171 ft (52 m)	12	1917	Office		
12	The Maclellan	MaclellanBuildingChattanooga	35°02′51.63″N 85°18′39.25″W	169 ft (52 m)	13	1924	Residential	Listed on the National Register of Historic Places since 1985.	
13	Chattanooga Marriott Downtown	Chattanooga Marriott Convention Center Downtown chattanooga (cropped)	35°02′37.14″N 85°18′44.02″W	164 ft (50 m)	15	1985	Hotel		
14	Patten Towers	Hotel_Patten,_W.T._Downing,_Architect_(NBY_2548)	35°02′38.20″N 85°18′31.91″W	163 ft (50 m)	12	1908	Residential	Designed by Walter T. Downing, with Reuben H. Hunt serving as the local associate architect.	
15	Dome Building	Dome Building, Chattanooga, Tennessee	35°02′50.31″N 85°18′26.05″W	150 ft (46 m)	7	1892	Office	Listed on the National Register of Historic Places since 1978.	

== Tallest demolished or under demolition ==
This list ranks buildings in Chattanooga with given heights that are either demolished or are under demolition.

Name	Image	Location	Height	Floors	Year built	Year demolished	Purpose	Notes	References
Medical Arts Building	MedicalArtsBuildingChattanooga	35°02′45.98″N 85°18′09.17″W	146 ft (45 m)	10	1929	2026 (Note: Currently being demolished.)	Office	Designed by Reuben H. Hunt.	

== Timeline of tallest buildings ==
Name	Image	Years as tallest	Height	Floors
Dome Building	OchsBuildingChattanooga	1892-1907	150 ft (46 m)	7
James Building	JamesBuildingChattanooga	1907-1911	179 ft (55 m)	12
First Horizon Bank Building	736 Market Street and Heritage Hamilton Apartments, Chattanooga (cropped)	1911-1968	210 ft (64 m)	17
Truist Tower	Truist Tower Grateful Gobbler 2025 02 (cropped)	1968-1977	251 ft (77 m)	20
Republic Centre	Republic_Centre,_633_Chestnut_St,_Chattanooga,_TN,_37450_(cropped)	1977-Present	268 ft (82 m)	21

== See also ==
- List of tallest buildings in Tennessee
- List of tallest buildings in Knoxville
- List of tallest buildings in Memphis
- List of tallest buildings in Nashville
