= Truist Tower =

Skyscraper in Chattanooga, Tennessee, US

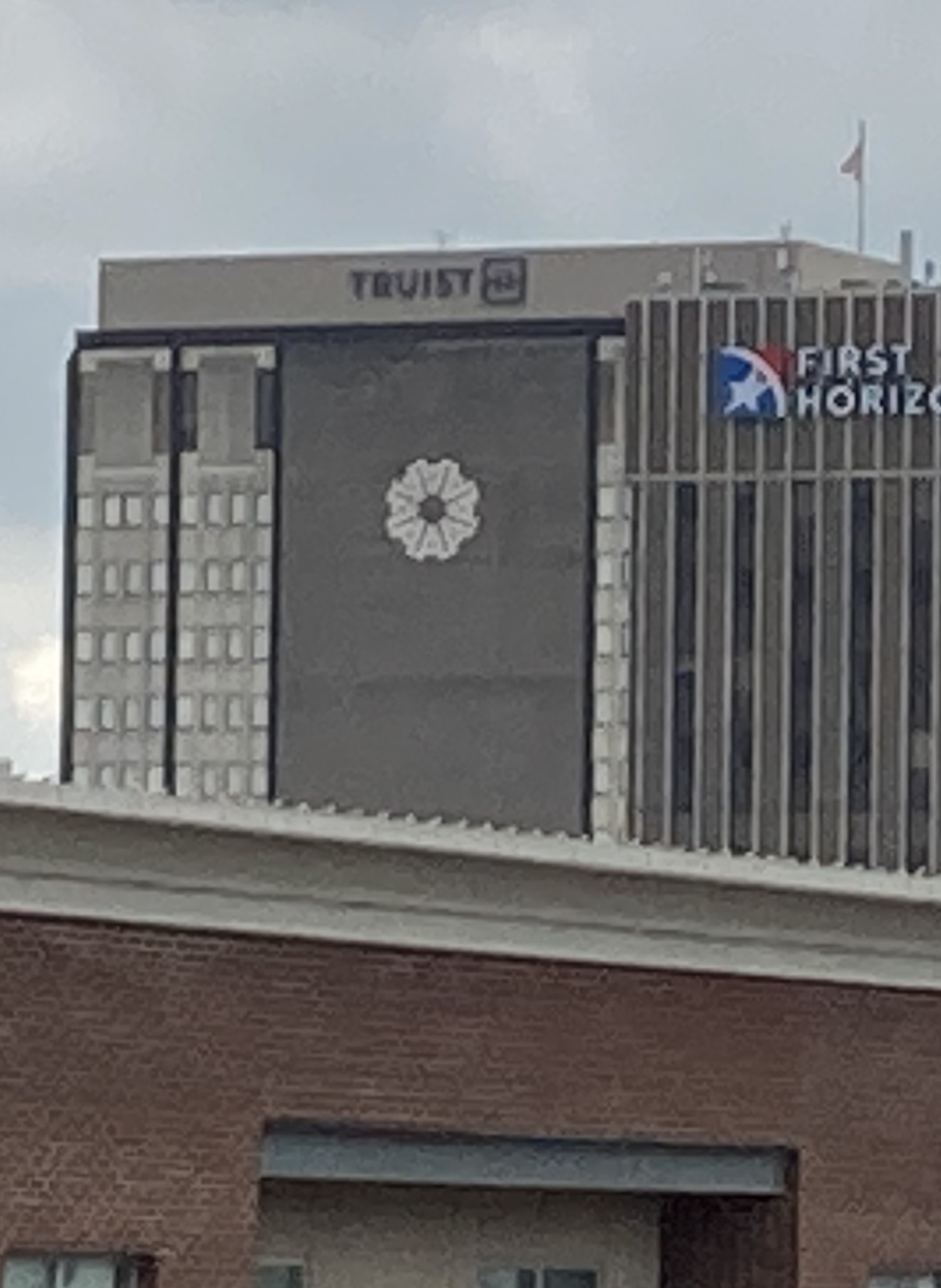
- Truist Tower 736 Market Street and Heritage Hamilton Apartments, Chattanooga (cropped) Truist Tower in 2024
- Interactive map of the Truist Tower area
- Former names: American National Bank Building, SunTrust Bank Building

General information
- Status: Completed
- Type: Office
- Architectural style: Modern
- Location: 736 Market Street, Chattanooga, Tennessee, United States
- Coordinates: 35°02′50.66″N 85°18′32.64″W
- Completed: 1968

Height
- Roof: 251 ft (77 m)

Technical details
- Floor count: 20

Design and construction
- Architect: Alfred Easton Poor

Truist Tower (formerly known as the SunTrust Bank Building and as the American National Bank Building) is a 251 ft (77 m) tall modern office building located on 736 Market Street in Downtown Chattanooga, Tennessee. The building has 20 floors and was built in 1968. Upon its completion, it surpassed the Hamilton National Bank Building (now known as the First Horizon Bank Building) as the tallest building in Chattanooga, which held the title since 1911. The building would stay the tallest building in Chattanooga until 1977, when the 268 ft (82 m) tall, Republic Centre was built. As of 2026, the building is the 2nd-tallest building in Chattanooga.

The building was designed by Alfred Easton Poor, who also designed the Jacob K. Javits Federal Building in New York City, Home Insurance Plaza in New York City, and the James Madison Memorial Building in Washington D.C..

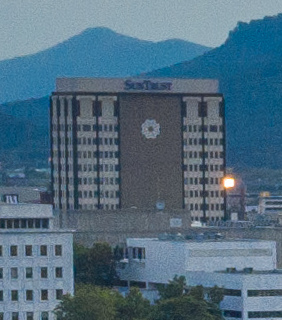
Truist Tower in 2018 with the former SunTrust signage

== See also ==
- First Horizon Bank Building
- Liberty Tower (Chattanooga, Tennessee)
