= The Maclellan =

- Maclellan Building
- U.S. National Register of Historic Places
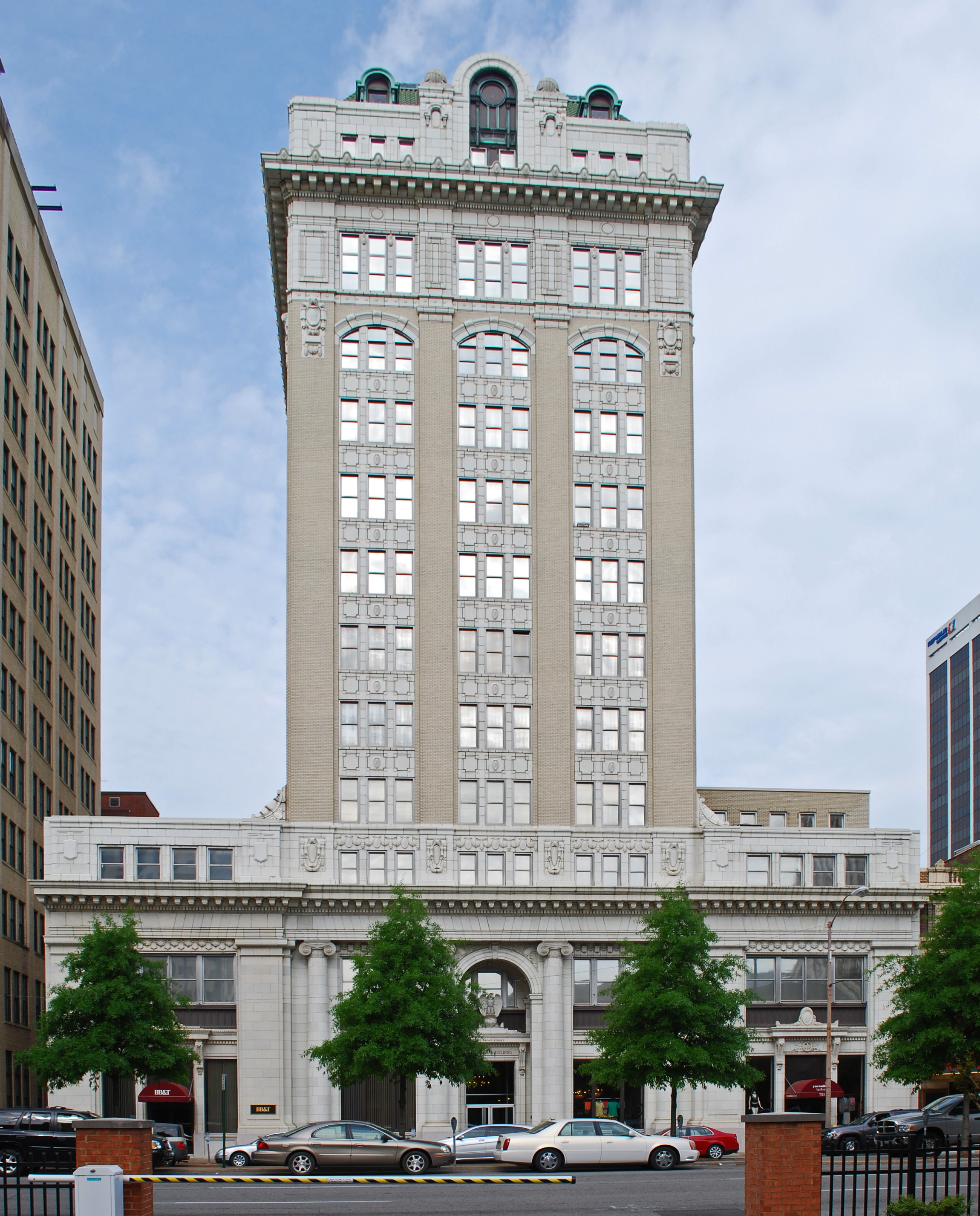
- The Maclellan in 2010

- Location within Tennessee Location within the United States
- Location: 721 Broad Street, Chattanooga, Tennessee
- Coordinates: 35°02′51.63″N 85°18′39.25″W
- Built: 1924
- Architect: Reuben Harrison Hunt
- Architectural style: Neoclassical
- NRHP reference No.: 85000708
- Added to NRHP: April 4, 1985

The Maclellan (also known as the Maclellan Building and formerly known as the Provident Life and Accident Building) is a 169 ft (52 m) tall neoclassical style residential building located on 721 Broad Street in Downtown Chattanooga, Tennessee. The building has 13 floors and was built in 1924. Upon its completion, it became the 4th-tallest building in Chattanooga. As of August 2026, it is the 12th-tallest building in Chattanooga.

The building was designed by Reuben Harrison Hunt, who also designed the neighboring James Building, which was Chattanooga's first skyscraper and its tallest from 1907 to 1911. He also designed the Northside Presbyterian Church, Soldiers and Sailors Memorial Auditorium, and the Joel W. Solomon Federal Building and United States Courthouse.

The building was built for the Provident Life and Accident Insurance Company (now known as Unum). Its design was inspired by the beforementioned James Building and the 171 ft (52 m) tall, Volunteer Life Building.

The building was listed on the National Register of Historic Places in 1985.

The building was converted to residential use in 2017 by the Memphis based real estate development company, Heritage Land and Development.

== See also ==
- First Horizon Bank Building
- Hunter Museum of American Art
- The Read House Hotel
- Second Presbyterian Church (Chattanooga, Tennessee)
