= Liberty Tower (Chattanooga, Tennessee) =

Skyscraper in Chattanooga, Tennessee, US

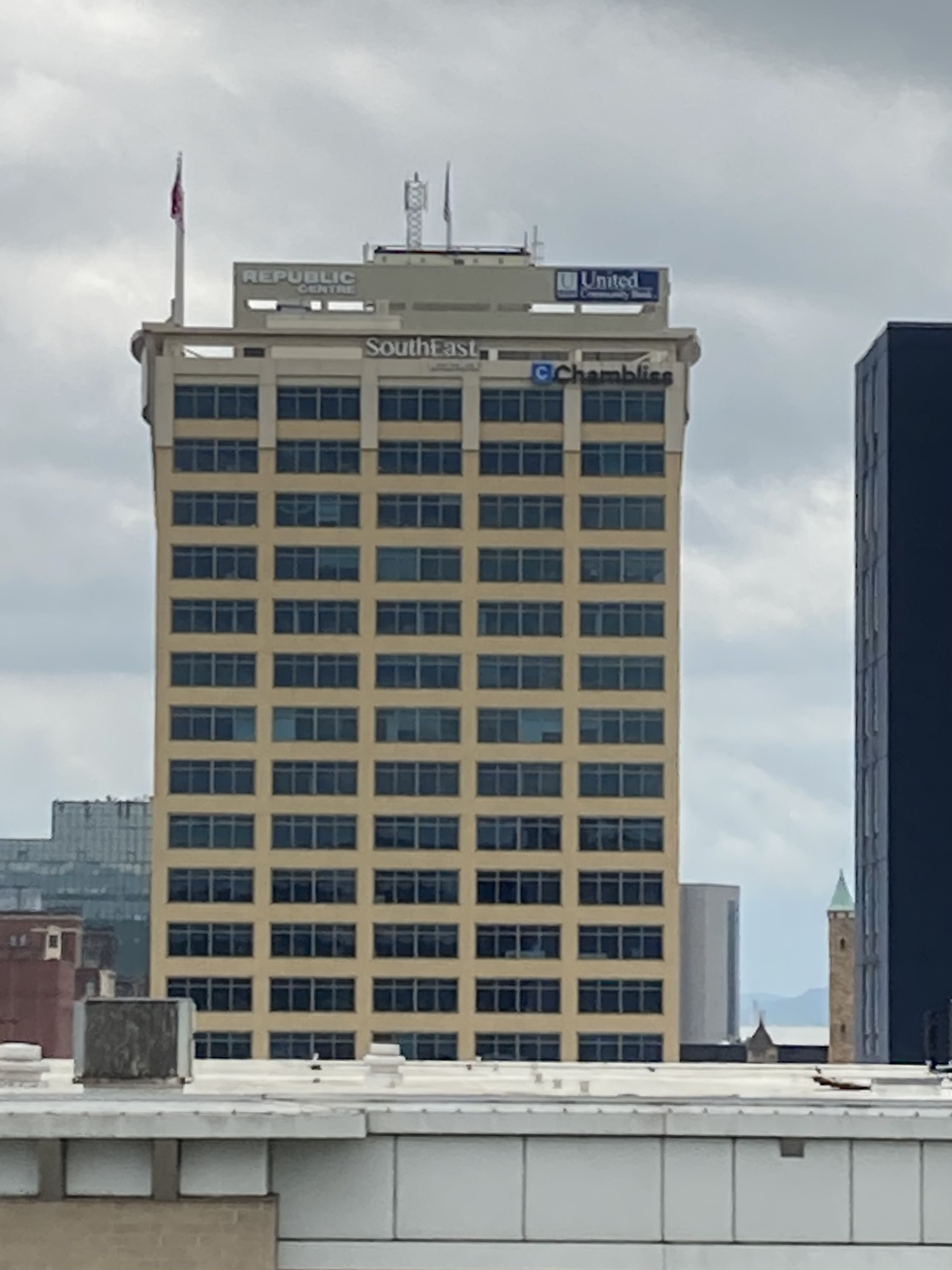
- Liberty_Tower_and_Republic_Centre Liberty Tower in 2024
- Interactive map of the Liberty Tower area
- Former names: Chestnut Tower, Chestnut Street Tower

General information
- Status: Completed
- Type: Office
- Architectural style: Modern
- Location: 605 Chestnut Street, Chattanooga, Tennessee, United States
- Coordinates: 35°02′57.59″N 85°18′43.09″W
- Completed: 1979

Height
- Roof: 214 ft (65 m)

Technical details
- Floor count: 17

Liberty Tower (formerly known as the Chestnut Tower and as the Chestnut Street Tower) is a 214 ft (65 m) tall modern office building located on 605 Chestnut Street in Downtown Chattanooga, Tennessee. The building has 17 floors and was built in 1979. Upon its completion, it became the 3rd-tallest building in Chattanooga. As of August 2026, it is still the 3rd-tallest building in Chattanooga.

In 2008, the building would go up for sale.

In 2009, Jim Berry bought the building. After paying the building's original developer, Franklin Haney $4 million dollars, Jim Berry would spend $20 million dollars to renovate it. Included in the renovations was redoing the building's facade. In 2013, the Liberty Tower was opened. Along with its opening, a 11 ft (3.4 m) tall replica of the Statue of Liberty was unveiled and put in the building's lobby.

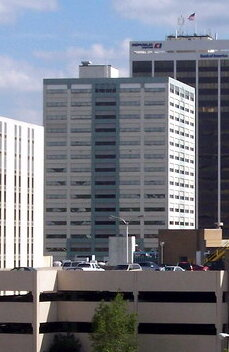
The building in 2007, prior to the renovations by Jim Berry

The building would achieve the gold standard for LEED, making it the largest refurbished office building in Tennessee to do so.

In 2020, MFG Chemical moved its corporate headquarters into the building.

== See also ==
- Truist Tower
- First Horizon Bank Building
- James Building (Chattanooga, Tennessee)
- The Maclellan
- The Read House Hotel
- Chattanooga Choo-Choo Hotel
- Tennessee Aquarium
- Volkswagen Chattanooga Assembly Plant
- Erlanger (hospital system)
