= Chattanooga State Office Building =

Historic building in Tennessee, United States

Coordinates: 35.0461°N 85.3033°W

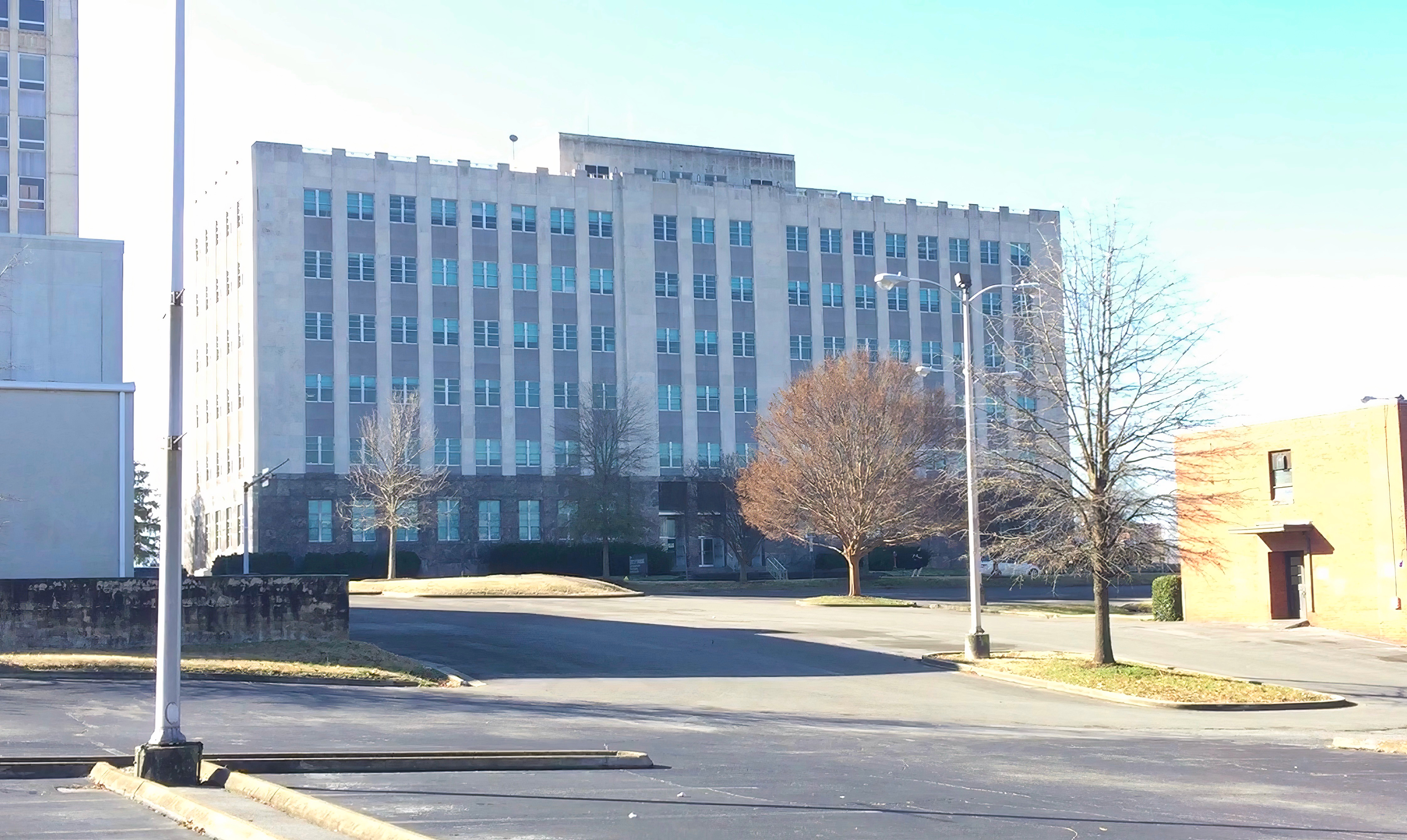
The Chattanooga State Office Building pictured on January 17, 2015

The Chattanooga State Office Building is a historic building at 540 McCallie Avenue in downtown Chattanooga, Tennessee, in the United States.

The six-story building was built in 1950 at a cost of $1.75 million to be the headquarters for the Interstate Life Insurance Company. Designed in the Art Moderne style, the exterior has ruby granite on the bottom, gray-white limestone on the top, and a bronze frieze near the McCallie Avenue doorway. The frieze, created by a Tennessee sculptor, is "intended to represent the sturdy mountain character of Southeast Tennesseans." The building's interior once contained a penthouse lounge, an auditorium, and basement bowling alley as recreational areas for employees. The National Trust for Historic Preservation describes the building as an emblem of 1950s innovation, representing "a Mad Men-era workplace." In 1973, plans for the addition of a 65,000-square-foot wing were announced; this increased the building space by 72 percent.

By 1980, the insurance company offered to sell the building to the State of Tennessee for $8 million. In 1981, the state acquired the building (as well as 6.17 acres and a 5,100-square-foot warehouse) for 5.85 million. The building was then used for state government offices until December 2013, when the state "decommissioned" the building (along with the nearby James R. Mapp Building and three other buildings) and transferred the building to the University of Tennessee at Chattanooga (UTC). Nearly 400 state employees vacated the building that year.

UTC plans to demolish the building and construct a new, $59 million dormitory on the site. Preservationists oppose the project and have urged the university to renovate the original building instead. To renovate the existing building would cost an estimated $8.49 million, mostly to replace outdated heating, ventilation and air conditioning systems. In 2014, the National Trust for Historic Preservation added the building to its annual "America's Most Endangered Places" list.

In October 2015, UTC received approval to move ahead with repairs to the Mapp Building and Chattanooga State Office Building.

== See also ==
- First Horizon Bank Building
- Hamilton County Courthouse (Tennessee)
