= Wright Brothers National Memorial =

Monument marking the location of the first airplane flight

- U.S. National Register of Historic Places
- U.S. National Memorial
- U.S. National Historic Landmark
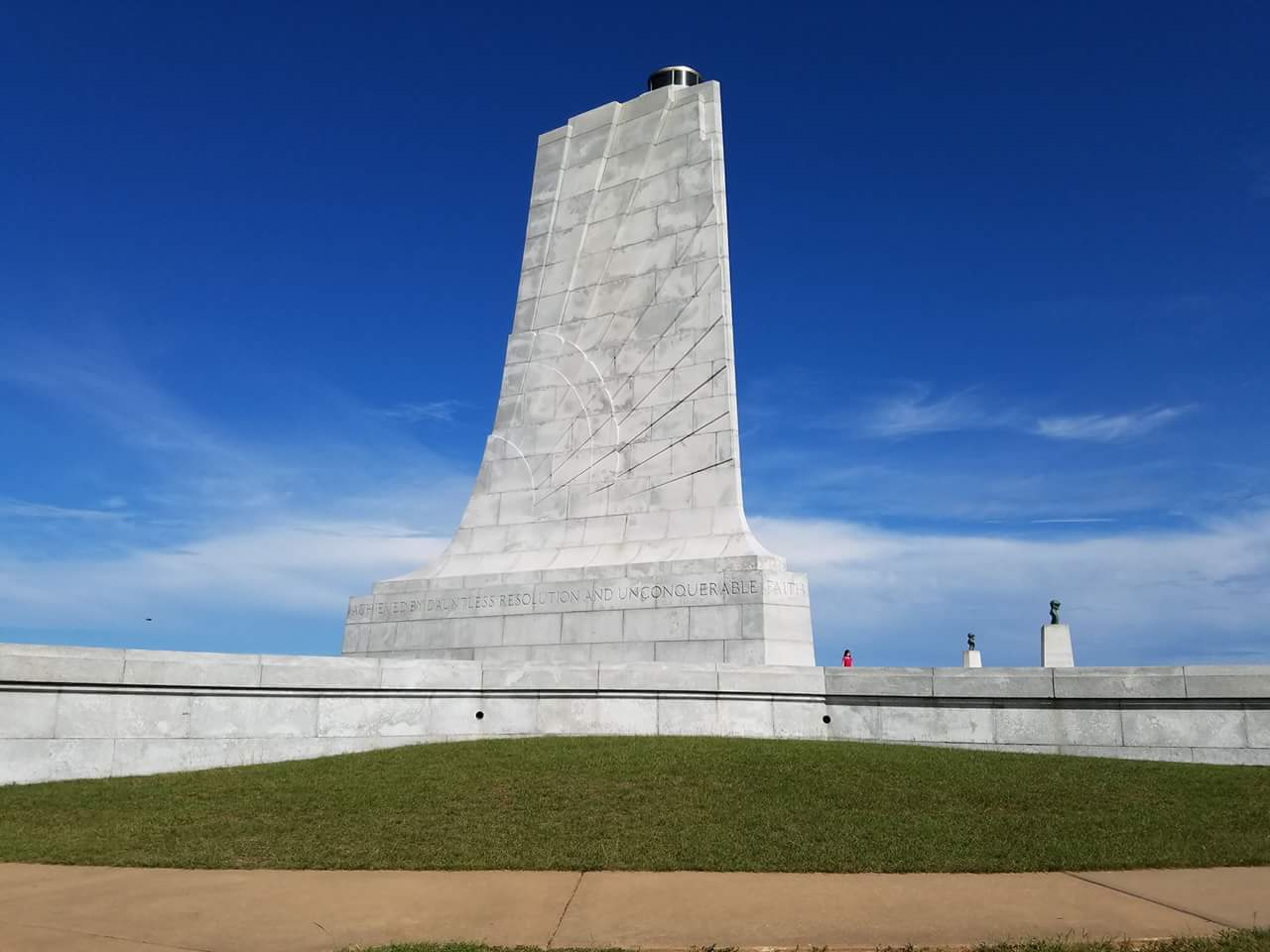
- Monument at Wright Brothers National Memorial

- Location within North Carolina
- Location: 1000 North Croatan Highway; Kill Devil Hills, North Carolina.
- Coordinates: 36.0143°N 75.6679°W
- Area: 428 acres (173 ha)
- Architect: Robert Rodgers and Alfred Easton Poor
- Architectural style: Art Deco
- Visitation: 406,593 (2024)
- Website: www.nps.gov/wrbr/index.htm
- NRHP reference No.: 66000071

Significant dates
- Authorized: March 2, 1927
- Added to NRHP: October 15, 1966
- Designated NMEM: December 4, 1953
- Designated NHL: January 3, 2001 (Note: The National Memorial is officially named the Wright Brothers National Memorial Visitor Center.)

Wright Brothers National Memorial (originally the Kill Devil Hill Monument), located in Kill Devil Hills, North Carolina, commemorates Wright Flyer; the first successful, sustained, powered flights in a heavier-than-air machine. From 1900 to 1903, Wilbur and Orville Wright came to North Carolina from Dayton, Ohio, based on information from the U.S. Weather Bureau about the area's steady winds. They also valued the privacy provided by this location, which in the early twentieth century was remote from major population centers.

== History ==
Authorized as Kill Devil Hill Monument on March 2, 1927, it was transferred from the War Department to the National Park Service on August 10, 1933. Congress renamed it and designated it a national memorial on December 4, 1953. As with all historic areas administered by the National Park Service, the national memorial was listed on the National Register of Historic Places on October 15, 1966. The memorial's visitor center, designed by Ehrman Mitchell and Romaldo Giurgola, was designated a National Historic Landmark on January 3, 2001. The memorial is co-managed with two other Outer Banks parks, Fort Raleigh National Historic Site and Cape Hatteras National Seashore.

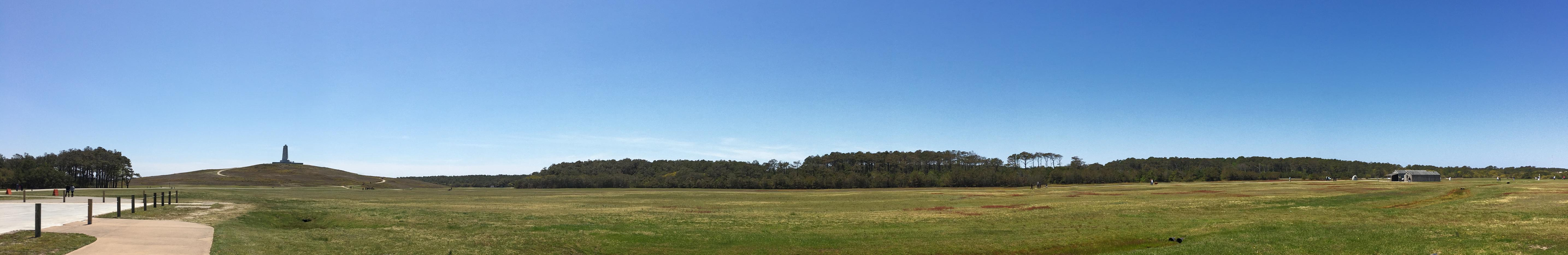
Panoramic view of park.

== Exhibits and features ==
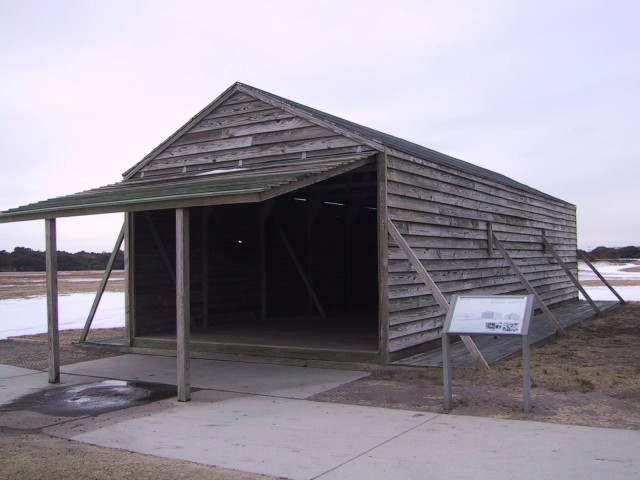
Replica of hangar used by Wright Brothers.

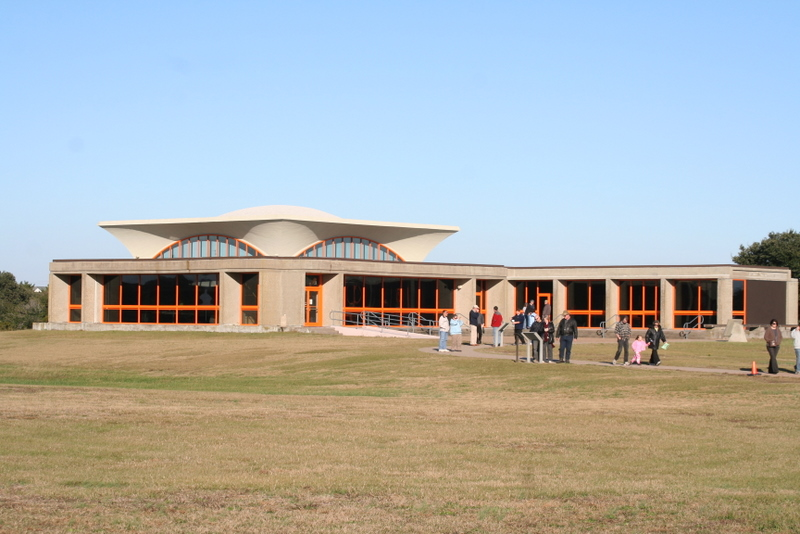
The Wright Brothers National Memorial Visitor Center.

=== The field and hangar ===
The Wrights made four flights from level ground near the base of the hill on December 17, 1903, in the Wright Flyer, following three years of gliding experiments from atop this and other nearby sand dunes. The starts and finishes of the routes of the four flights are marked with small monuments. Two wooden sheds, based on historic photographs, recreate the world's first airplane hangar and the brothers' living quarters.

=== Visitor Center ===
The Visitor Center is home to a museum featuring models and the tools and machines used by the Wright brothers during their flight experiments, including a reproduction of the wind tunnel used to test wing shapes and a portion of the engine used in the first flight. In one wing of the Visitor Center is a life-sized replica of the Wright brothers' 1903 Wright Flyer, the first powered heavier-than-air aircraft to achieve controlled flight (the original being displayed at the National Air and Space Museum in Washington D.C.). A full-scale model of the brothers' 1902 glider is also present, having been constructed under the direction of Orville Wright. On the walls of the glider room are portraits and photographs of other flight pioneers throughout history.

The visitor center's modern design was a departure from the National Park Service's earlier, more traditional buildings, and was built as part of its "Mission 66" modernization and expansion program. As the first major building of that effort, it was a high-profile success, bringing critical notice for its modern design and launching the careers of its designers. It was designated a National Historic Landmark in 1975 for its architecture and its importance to the Park Service's program.

=== Kill Devil Hill and the Memorial Tower ===
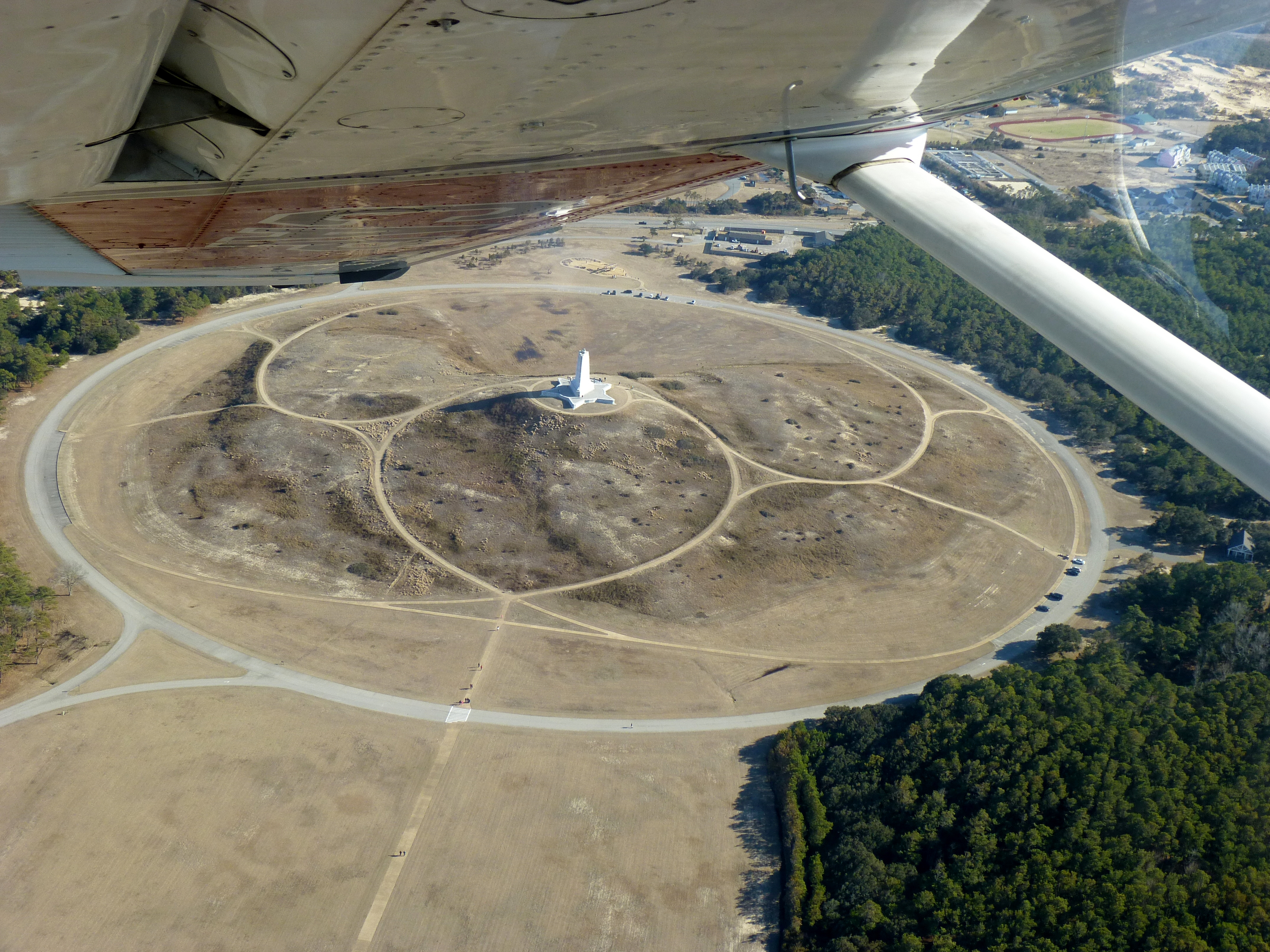
The Wright Brothers Memorial from the air.

A 60 feet (18.29 m) granite monument, dedicated in 1932, is perched atop 90-foot-tall (27 m) Kill Devil Hill, commemorating the achievement of the Wright brothers. They conducted many of their glider tests on the large shifting dune that was later stabilized to form Kill Devil Hill. Inscribed in capital letters along the base of the memorial tower is the phrase "In commemoration of the conquest of the air by the brothers Wilbur and Orville Wright conceived by genius achieved by dauntless resolution and unconquerable faith." Atop the tower is a marine beacon, similar to one found in a lighthouse.

The doors of the tower are stainless steel over nickel, with a price of $3,000 in 1928 (equivalent to $43,170 in 2024). The six relief panels represent the conquest of the air:

- Left door (top to bottom):
  - The inventions of a French locksmith named Besnier, who theorized that he could fly if he propelled himself into the air while wearing paddles on his arms and legs.
  - An homage to Otto Lilienthal, a German aviation inventor who died while conducting gliding experiments.
  - A reference to Cyrano de Bergerac, a French philosopher who hypothesized that, since dew rose in the morning, if it could be placed in an expandable bag attached to a box and sail, it would naturally rise when placed in the sun.
- Right door (top to bottom):
  - Icarus, the Greek mythological figure who tried to fly from Crete by attaching feathers to his arms with wax. He fell when he flew too close to the sun, melting the wax.
  - Bird flight to plane flight, or the rise of a phoenix.
  - Kites used by the Wrights and others in early experiments.

==== Building the Memorial ====
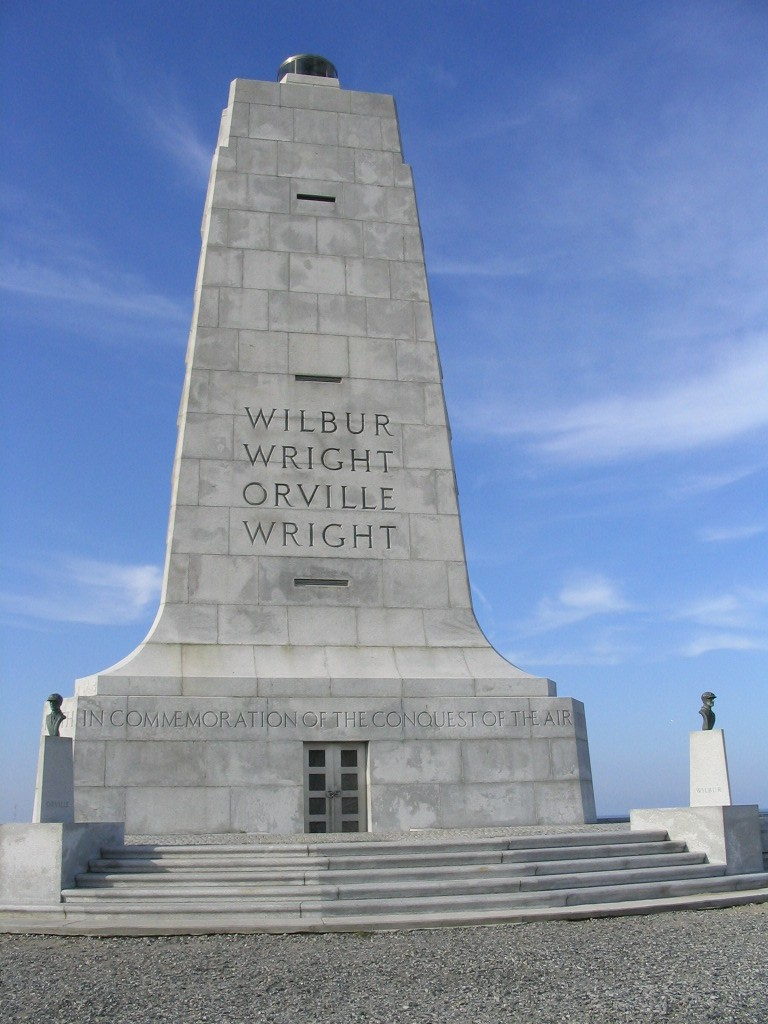
The Kill Devil Hill Monument.

The tower was designed by Robert Rodgers and Alfred Easton Poor, a New York City architectural firm; the design was officially selected on February 14, 1930. Prior to the memorial's construction, the War Department selected Captain William H. Kindervater of the Quartermaster Corps to prepare the site for construction and to manage the area landscaping. To secure the sandy foundation, Captain Kindervater selected Bermuda grass to be planted on Kill Devil Hill and the surrounding area. He also ordered a special fertilizer to be spread throughout the area to promote grass and shrubbery growth and decided to build a fence to prevent animal grazing. With a strong foundation in place, the Office of the Quartermaster selected Marine Captain John A. Gilman to preside over the construction project. Construction began in October 1931 and with a budget of $213,000 (equivalent to $3.53 million in 2024), the memorial was completed in November 1932. In the end, 1,200 tons (1.1 million kg) of granite, more than 2,000 tons (1.8 million kg) of gravel, more than 800 tons (730,000 kg) of sand and almost 400 tons (360,000 kg) of cement were used to build the structure, along with numerous other materials. It is constructed of granite mined at the North Carolina Granite Corporation Quarry Complex.

==== Memorial dedication ====
November 19, 1932, was selected as the dedication day. Over 20,000 people were expected to attend the event, but only around 1,000 come on the stormy and windy day. Orville Wright was the main guest of honor at the ceremony, and aviator Ruth Nichols was given the privilege of removing the American flag that covered the word "Genius" and the plaque on the monument. President Herbert Hoover was unable to attend the ceremony, but a letter from the President was read prior to the dedication.

==== Repairs ====
In 2008, the memorial, which had long had issues with seepage, was refurbished and better water control measures were installed. Interior lighting was improved and a steel map of early aviation flights restored. Visitors occasionally may ascend the tower by reservation.

=== Centennial of Flight ===
Logo of the United States Centennial of Flight Commission.

The Century of Flight sculpture has identical rather than mirror image props.

On December 17, 2003, the Centennial of Flight was celebrated at the park. The ceremony was hosted by actor John Travolta, and included appearances by President George W. Bush, Apollo 11 astronauts Neil Armstrong and Buzz Aldrin, and test pilot Chuck Yeager. The Centennial Pavilion was built for the celebration and housed exhibits showing the Outer Banks at the turn-of-the-century, the development of the 1903 replica, and NASA provided displays on aviation and flight. Above the stage in the pavilion were Aldrin's words: "From Kitty Hawk to the Moon in Sixty-Six years." The Centennial Pavilion closed in 2014 and is slated to be demolished due to budget constraints.

An interactive sculpture was donated by the State of North Carolina and dedicated during the celebration. The life sized sculpture, created by Stephen H. Smith, is a full-sized replica of the 1903 Wright Flyer the moment the flight began and includes the Wright Brothers along with members of the Kill Devil Hills Life-Saving Station who assisted in moving the aircraft, as well as John T. Daniels who took the now-famous photograph of the first flight.

The sculpture correctly has a criss-crossed chain driving the port propeller but incorrectly has this propeller being identical to, rather than a mirror image of, the starboard propeller.

== Plane crash ==
On September 28, 2024, a single engine plane crashed while trying to land at the First Flight Airport in the memorial, killing all five occupants of the aircraft.

== Gallery ==
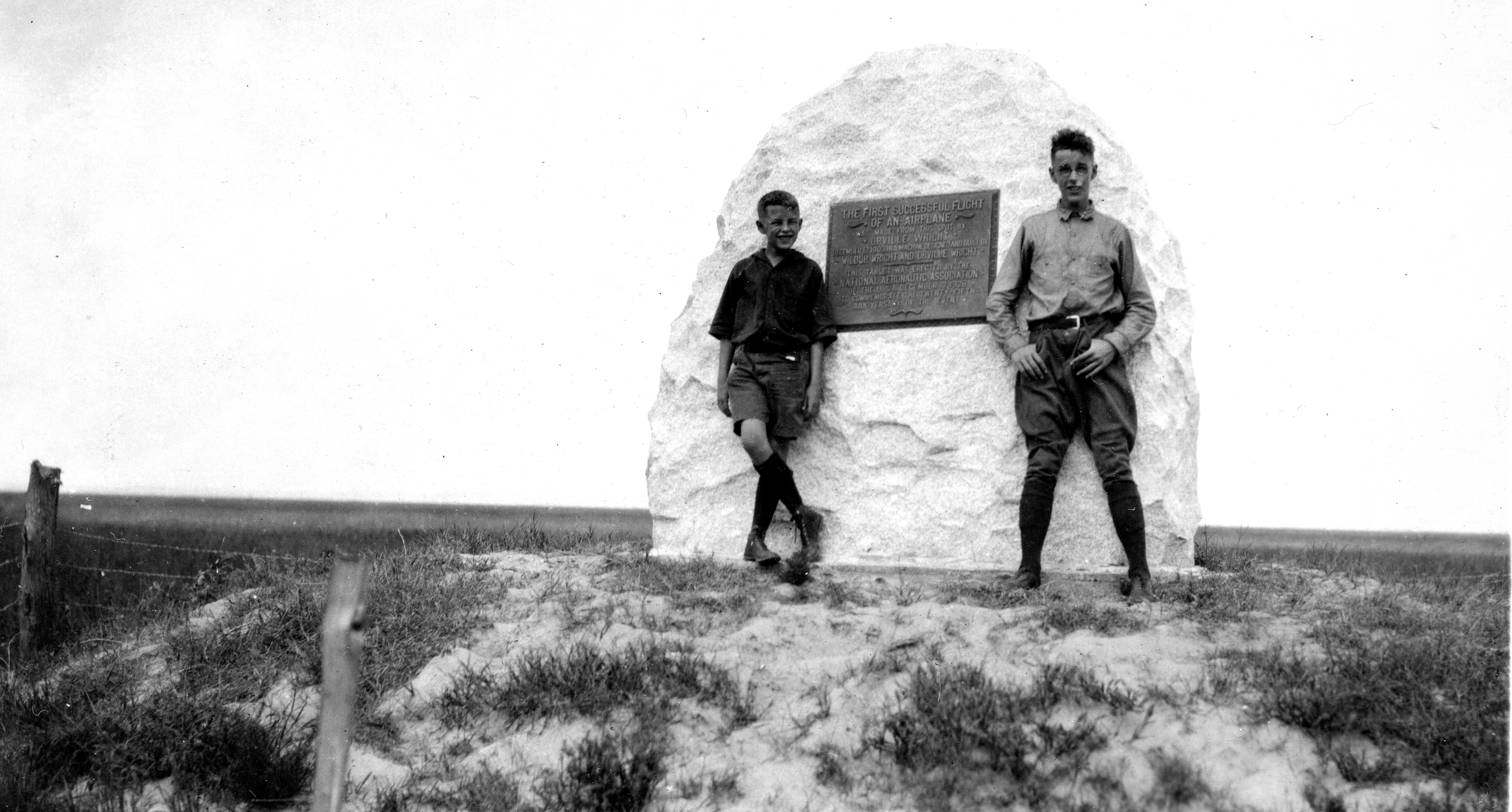
Kill Devil Hill Monument, as it appeared in 1929.

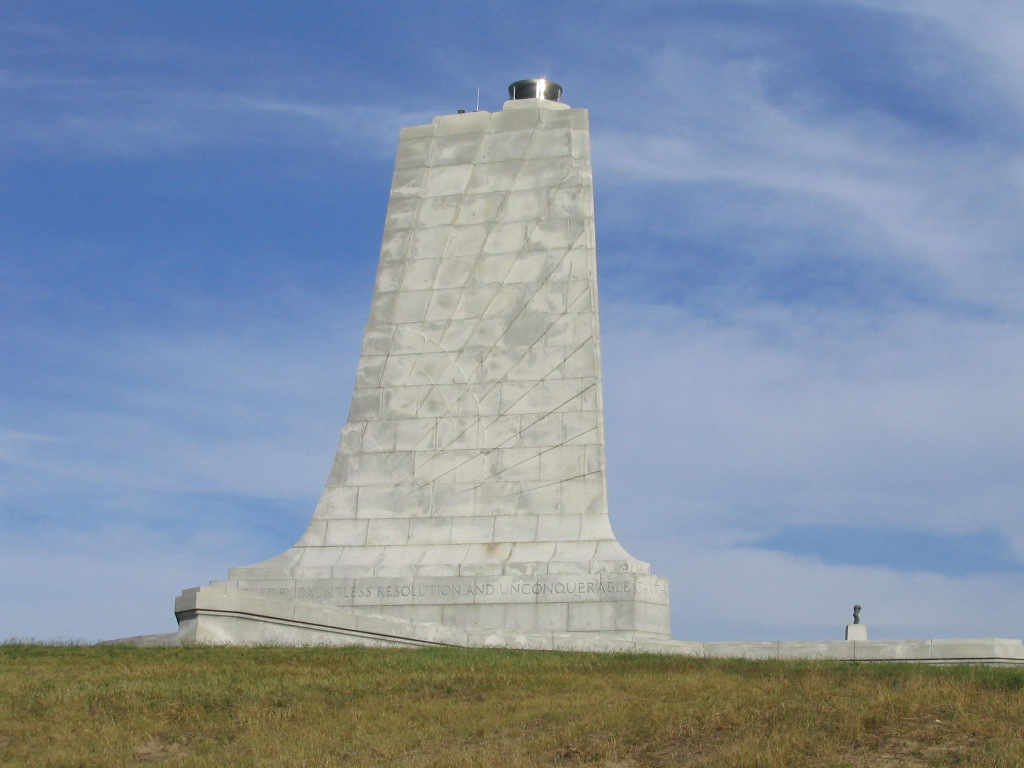
Photo of the monument from the rear.

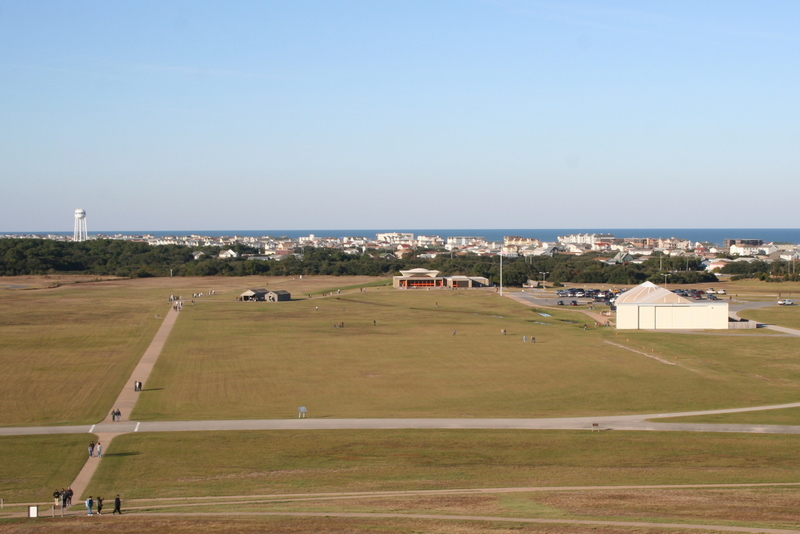
Overview of the site taken from the memorial atop Kill Devil Hill.

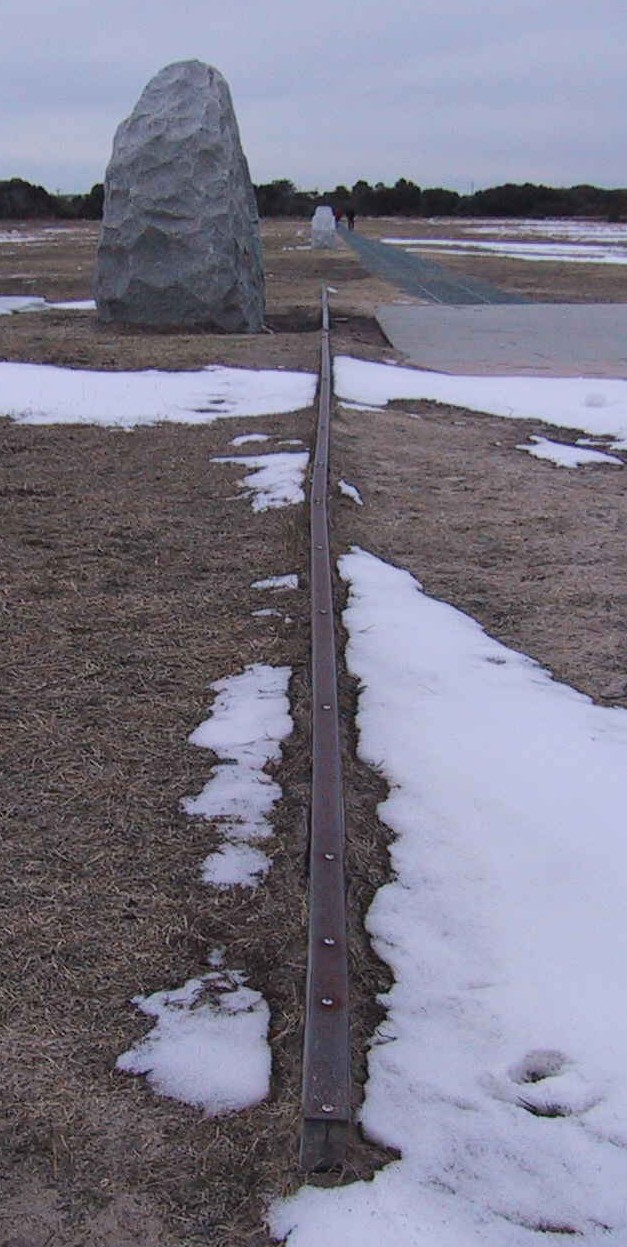
Reproduction of the launch rail

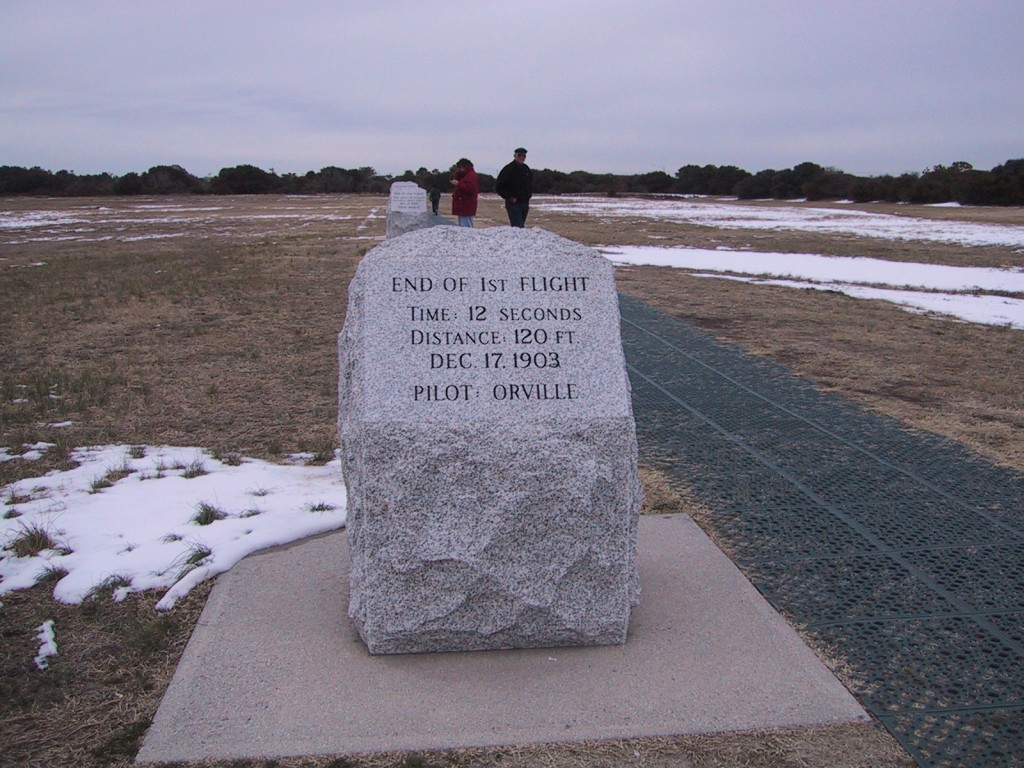
First landing spot

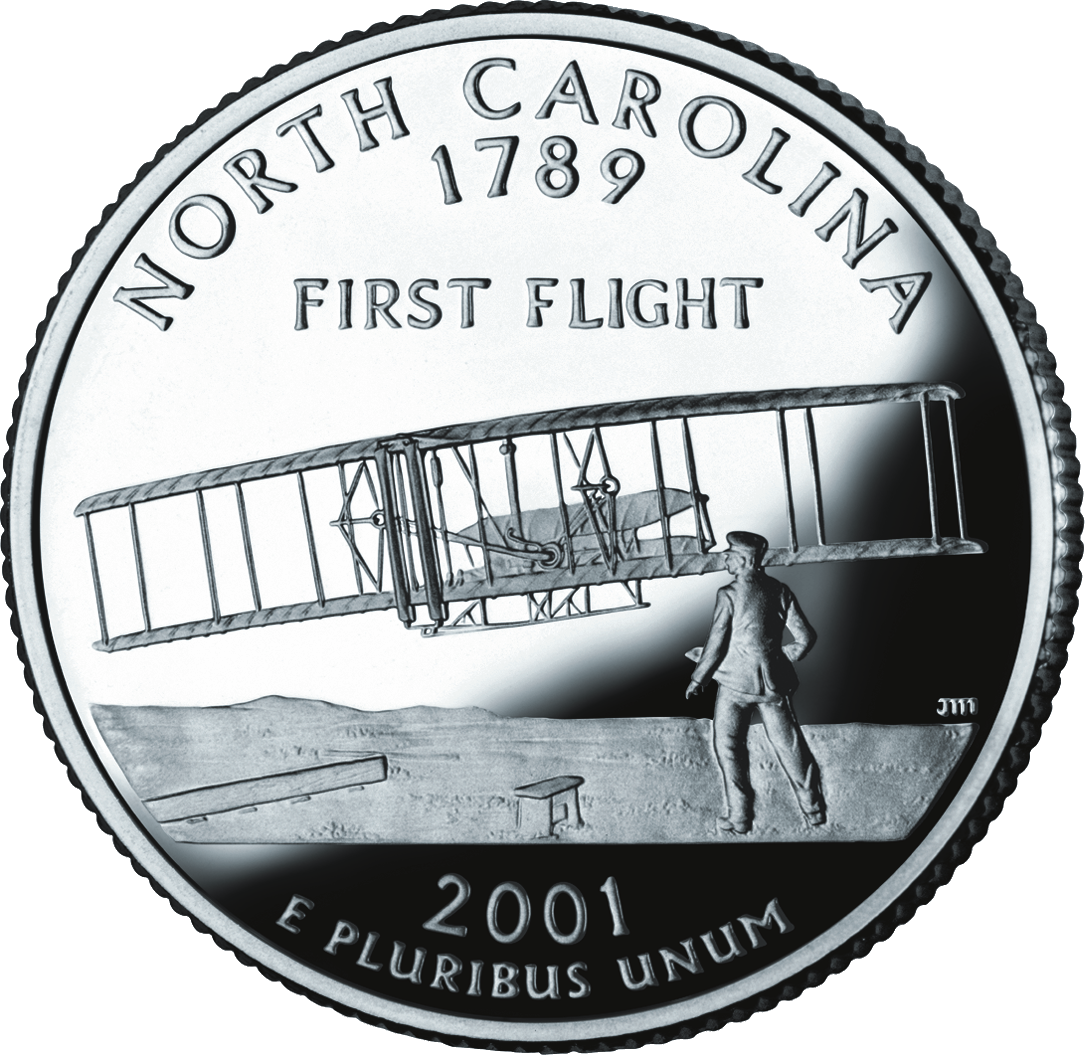
In 2001, the US Mint selected the first flight as the image North Carolina's issue in the state quarter series

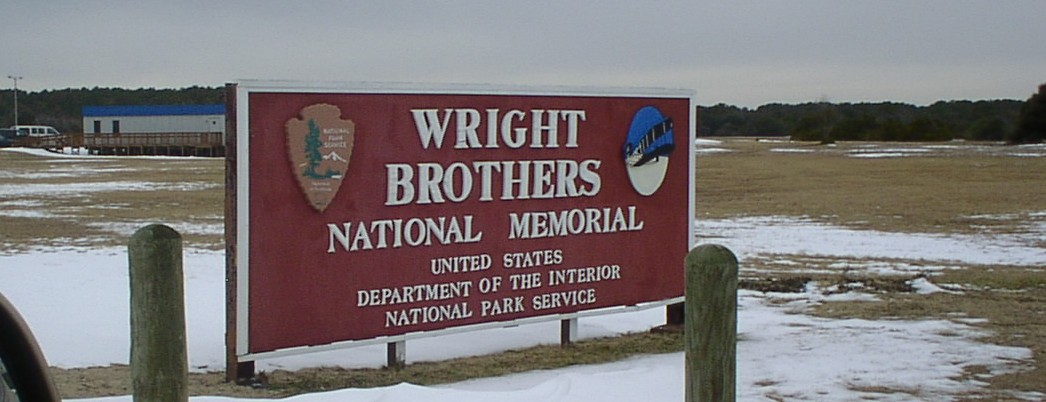
Sign by the National Park Service

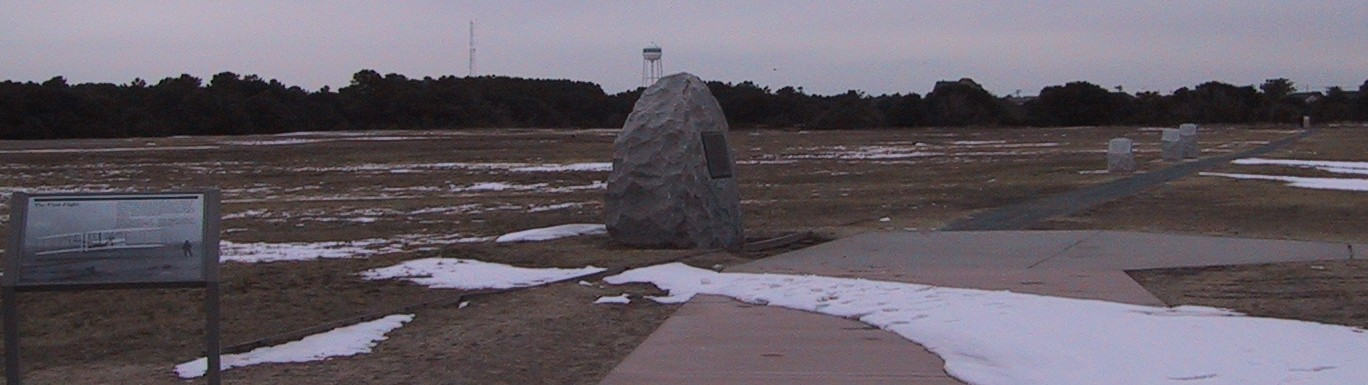
The first powered flight site from the east. The monument in the center was established in 1928.

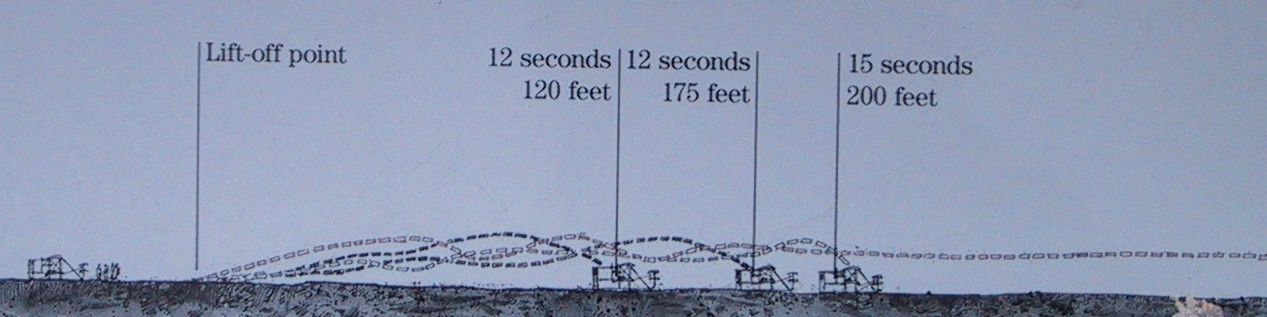
Flight profile from the east of three of the four flights on December 17, 1903. Fourth flight was 852 feet.

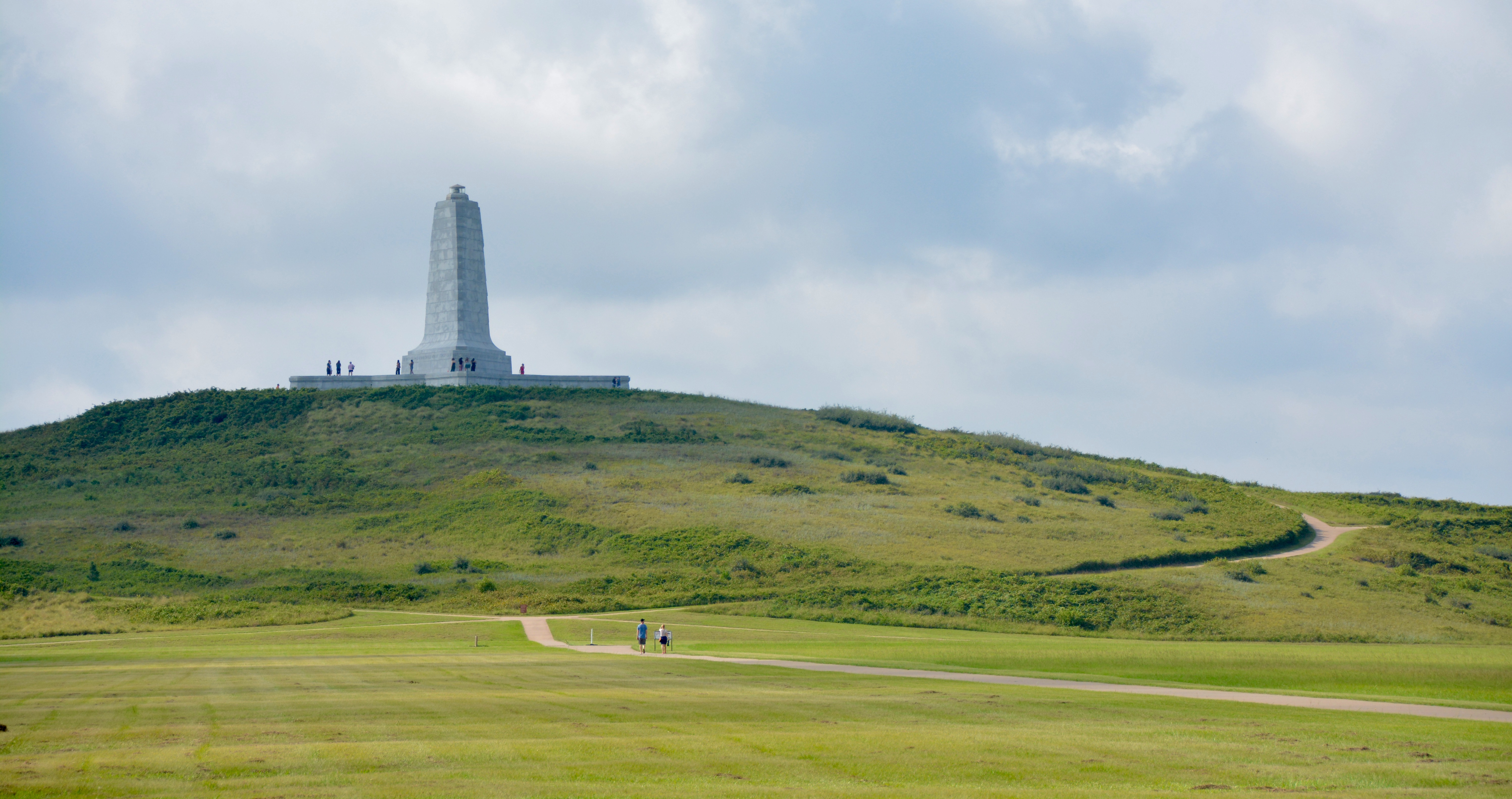
Big Kill Devil Hill

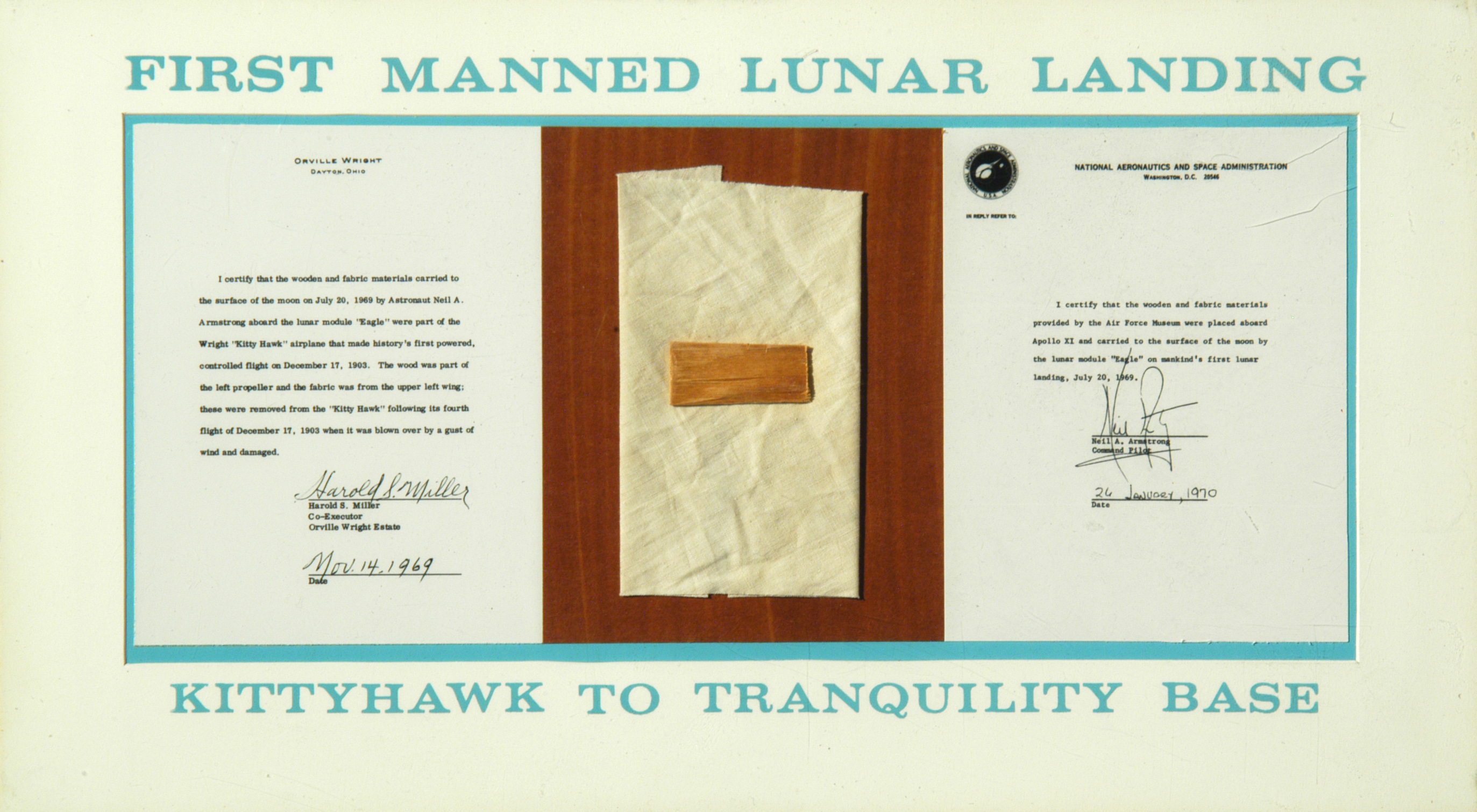
Pieces of fabric and wood from the Wright Flyer traveled to the Moon in 1969 in the Apollo 11 Lunar Module Eagle

== See also ==
- Dayton Aviation Heritage National Historical Park
- List of National Historic Landmarks in North Carolina
- List of national memorials of the United States
- National Register of Historic Places listings in Dare County, North Carolina
