= Stephen H. Smith =

American sculptor

Stephen H. Smith is an American sculptor best known for his interactive life-sized sculpture depicting the first flight of the Wright brothers 1903 Wright Flyer on display at the Wright Brothers Memorial in Kill Devil Hills, North Carolina. The sculpture was commissioned for the Centennial of Flight celebration by the State of North Carolina.

Smith has also created other public artworks such as a life sized sculpture of Martin Luther King Jr. for a park bearing his name in Fayetteville, North Carolina, of Benjamin Newton Duke for Duke University and for the Union County Community Arts Council in Union County, North Carolina.
