= St. Paul's Episcopal Church (Chattanooga, Tennessee) =

Historic church in Tennessee, United States

- U.S. National Register of Historic Places
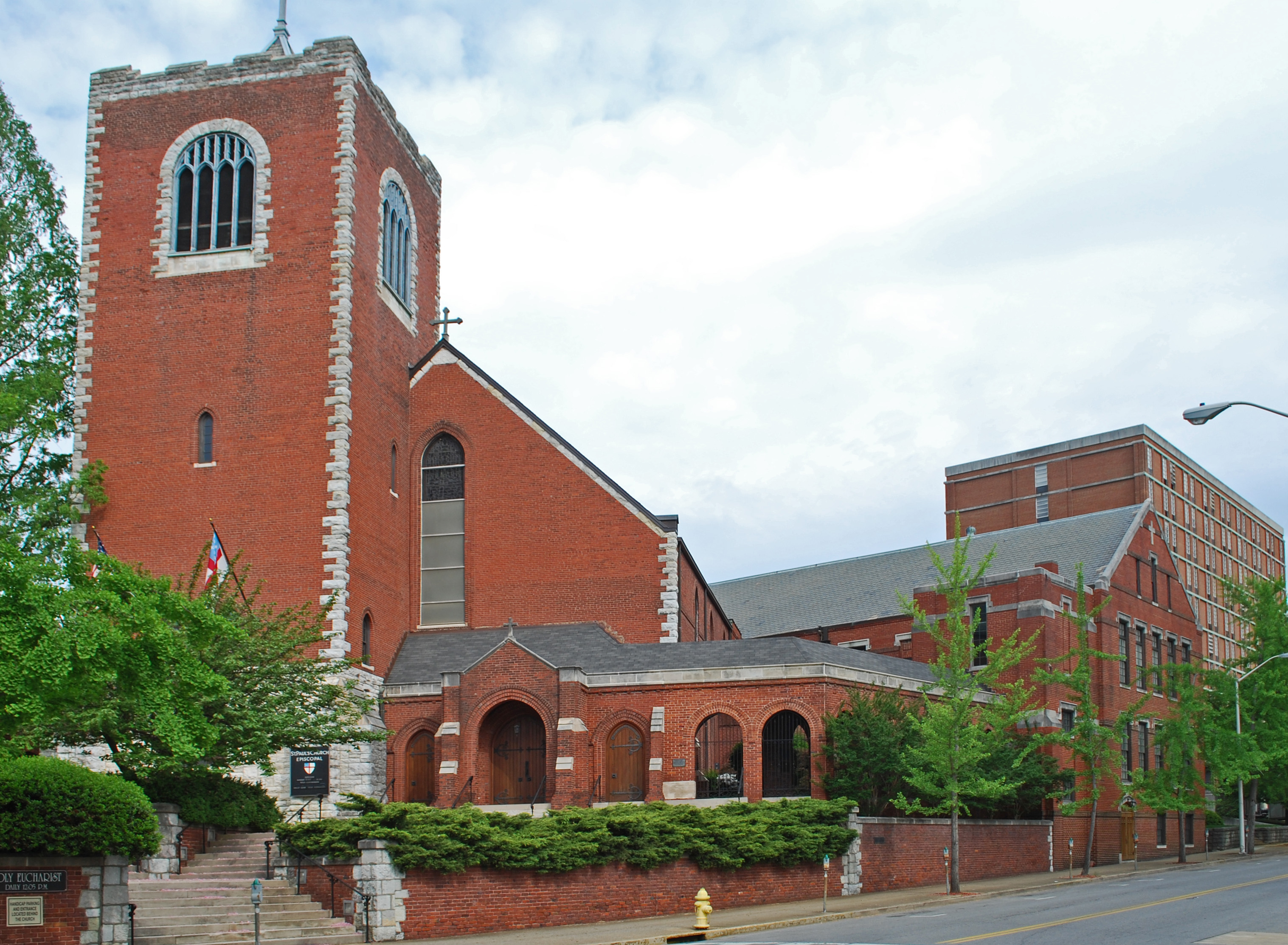

- Location within Tennessee Location within the United States
- Location: 7th and Pine Sts., Chattanooga, Tennessee
- Coordinates: 35°2′55″N 85°18′47″W
- Area: 1.5 acres (0.61 ha)
- Built: 1881
- Architect: William Halsey Wood
- Architectural style: Romanesque
- NRHP reference No.: 78002599
- Added to NRHP: September 1, 1978

St. Paul's Episcopal Church in Chattanooga, Tennessee, is a downtown congregation of the Episcopal Church. It is one of the largest congregations in the Episcopal Diocese of East Tennessee.

== Early history ==
The congregation first assembled in 1852, when local Episcopalians held worship services on the second floor of a general merchandise store at 4th and Market Streets. The parish was organized the following year in a meeting of ten families.

== Church buildings ==
The parish's first church building was at the corner of 8th and Chestnut. During the American Civil War, it was used as a military hospital and received serious damage. The building was repaired and returned to use in 1867 after the congregation received $3640 from the federal government as compensation for the damages. In 1880, the parish sold the property at 8th and Chestnut and acquired the property at 7th and Pine as the site for a new church.

The church's current building was built in 1881 and opened for worship in 1888. It was designed by New York City architect William Halsey Wood. Its design, which features a prominent bell tower, was modeled after a "typical English village church". The sanctuary has a high wooden ceiling and side galleries; it can seat about 450 people. The bell tower holds 11 bells that were cast by the McShane factory in Baltimore and dedicated in 1911. Architectural historian Ron Ramsay has described the church exterior as having Georgian elements, while the interior is "much more Gothic and much more Victorian". Wood used a similar design for churches in Kansas City and in La Crosse, Wisconsin. The church was listed on the National Register of Historic Places in 1978.

== Community service ==
Since 1996, St. Paul's has housed a homeless shelter for women and children in the undercroft of its building, operated in collaboration with the Chattanooga Community Kitchen. St. Catherine's Shelter can accommodate up to 14 people. It housed 276 women and 54 children during 2012. St. Paul's parishioners are also participants in a cooperative project that operates a men's shelter in the undercroft of the main building of the nearby Second Presbyterian Church. St. Matthew's Men's Night Shelter started in 1984 as a winter-only emergency shelter for homeless men. It now operates year-round to provide overnight housing for men who are participating in a rehabilitative program, such as the program of the Chattanooga Community Kitchen.

Other community service activities include hosting a daily Alcoholics Anonymous group and participation in the Chattanooga Area Food Bank, Metropolitan Ministries, and other ministry groups. St. Paul's also serves as a field education site for the School of Theology of Sewanee: The University of the South.
