= James Building (Chattanooga, Tennessee) =

- U.S. National Register of Historic Places
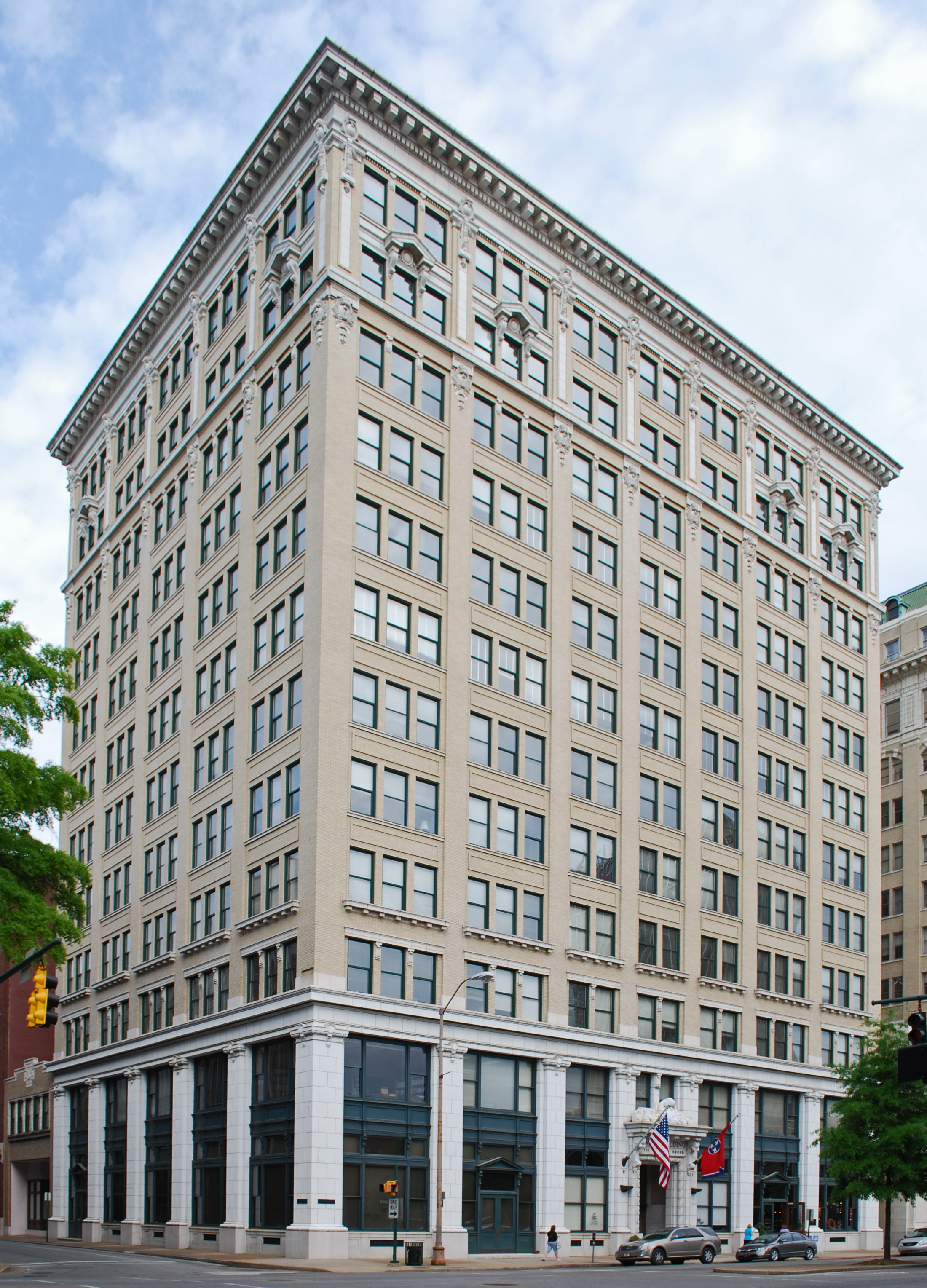
- The James Building in 2010

- Location within Tennessee Location within the United States
- Location: 735 Broad Street, Chattanooga, Tennessee
- Coordinates: 35°02′50.35″N 85°18′39.25″W
- Built: 1907
- Architect: Reuben Harrison Hunt
- Architectural style: Neoclassical
- NRHP reference No.: 80003814
- Added to NRHP: February 29, 1980

The James Building is a 179 ft (55 m) tall neoclassical style office building located on 735 Broad Street in Downtown Chattanooga, Tennessee. The building has 12 floors and was built in 1907. Upon its completion, it became the tallest building in Chattanooga. It also became Chattanooga's first skyscraper. The building would stay the tallest building in Chattanooga until 1911, when the 210 ft (64 m) tall, Hamilton National Bank Building (now known as the First Horizon Bank Building) was built. As of August 2026, the building is tied with Dogwood Manor as the 8th-tallest building in Chattanooga.

The building was designed by Reuben Harrison Hunt, who also designed many of Chattanooga's most famous buildings including the Asbury Chapel, Joel W. Solomon Federal Building and United States Courthouse, and the pre-1966 design of the First Horizon Bank Building.

The building was named after its developer, Charles E. James.

The building was listed on the National Register of Historic Places in 1980.

In 2014, the building was sold for $5.1 million dollars.

== See also ==
- Chattanooga State Office Building
- First Baptist Church Education Building
- Second Presbyterian Church (Chattanooga, Tennessee)
- Volkswagen Chattanooga Assembly Plant
