= Robert Rodgers (architect) =

American architect

- Born: June 1, 1895; Bethlehem, Pennsylvania, United States
- Died: June 4, 1934 (aged 39); Washington, DC, United States
- Occupation: Architect

Robert Perry Rodgers (July 1, 1895 – June 4, 1934) was an American architect who served in the U.S. Navy in World War I. His work was part of the architecture event in the art competition at the 1932 Summer Olympics. He graduated from Harvard University in 1917 and École des Beaux-Arts.

Along with New York architect Alfred Easton Poor, Rodgers won the open international design competition for the Wright Brothers National Memorial in 1928.

Rodgers was the last of the line of the Perry and Rodgers naval families. He was the great grandson of Commander Matthew C. Perry and son of Admiral John Augustus Rodgers Sr.

Rodgers lived at Sion Hill and in New York where he maintained his architecture firm. He died on June 4, 1934 after a short illness.

== See also ==
- John Rodgers, Robert's brother
- Alfred Easton Poor, Rodger's partner in architecture projects
