= Cape Cinema =

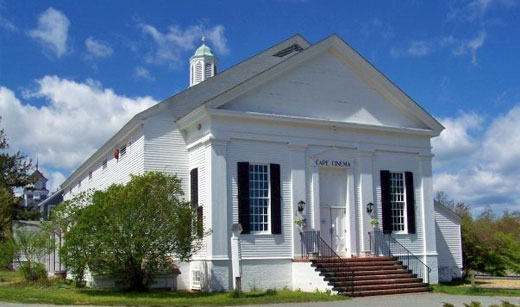
- The Cape Cinema, Dennis MA
- Interactive map of the Cape Cinema area

General information
- Architectural style: Art Deco, Colonial Revival
- Location: Dennis, Massachusetts
- Coordinates: 41.740354°N 70.189912°W
- Opened: 1930
- Owner: Cape Cod Center For The Arts, Inc

Design and construction
- Architect: Alfred Easton Poor

The Cape Cinema is a movie theatre in Dennis, Massachusetts, United States, on Cape Cod. Owned by the Cape Cod Center for the Arts, it specializes in independent American and international film, simulcasts of the Metropolitan Opera and National Theatre, and live music performances.

The Cape Cinema was founded in 1930 by Edna B. Tweedy and Raymond Moore, three years after Moore founded the Cape Playhouse. The building's exterior was designed by Alfred Easton Poor and modelled after the South Congregational Church in Centerville, Massachusetts. The auditorium is designed in the Art Deco style and includes 317 armchairs of black lacquer and tangerine suede produced by the Frankl Galleries in New York City. Moore and Tweedy commissioned American painter and illustrator Rockwell Kent to design a 6,400-square-foot mural for the auditorium's ceiling, featuring a representation of the heavens and constellations; it was installed by set designer Jo Mielziner.

In 1939, the Cape Cinema was the first theatre to preview The Wizard of Oz before its Hollywood premiere. Since 1986, the Cape Cinema has operated as an independent art house. In 2008, it launched a live music series that has hosted artists such as Bon Iver, Dirty Projectors, Glen Hansard, Saint Vincent, The Paper Kites, Tift Merritt, Martha Wainwright and Pat Fee.

== Murals ==
Raymond Moore hired Rockwell Kent to design the murals. Moore liked Kent's work and Kent had summered in the nearby town of Hyannis. The work of transferring and painting the designs on the 6,400-square-foot span was done by Kent's collaborator Jo Mielziner and a crew of stage set painters working in New York City. They worked in oil on strips of canvas that were then attached to the ceiling. Beginning from the lobby, the first of three sections depicts two constellations: a bull and a dog. The central and largest section depicts a dancing man and woman four times over as if dancing weightlessly across four frames of a film. Nearest the stage are two figures reaching toward a blazing disc, perhaps a comet or shooting star.

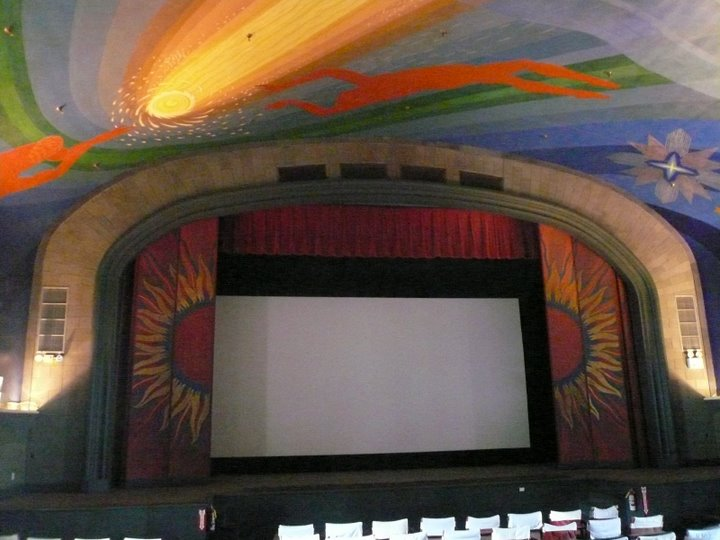
A partial view of the interior decoration

Kent said he did not paint and oversee the work himself because he refused to visit Massachusetts after the Sacco and Vanzetti execution of 1927. "Too many martinis" was the excuse he gave for having accepted the commission in the first place. He did go to Dennis in June 1930 and spend three days on the scaffolding, making suggestions and corrections. The signatures of both Kent and Mielziner appear on opposite walls of the cinema. The mural was described at the time as "what is said to be the world's largest mural".

Conservators from the Museum of Fine Arts, Boston restored the murals in 1981.
