= Home Insurance Plaza =

Office skyscraper in Manhattan, New York

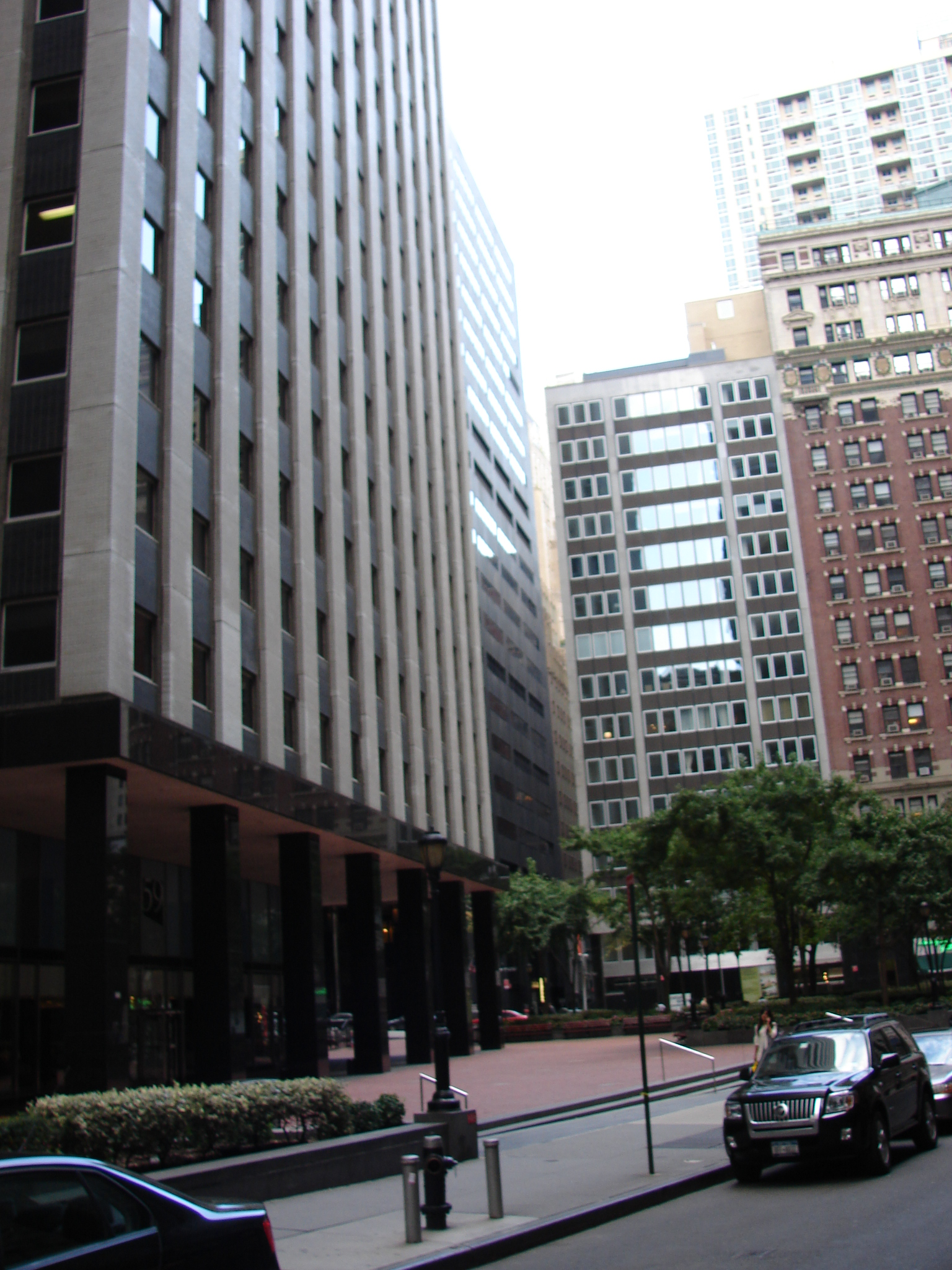
- Interactive map of the Home Insurance Plaza area

General information
- Type: Office
- Location: 59 Maiden Lane, New York City, New York
- Coordinates: 40°42′31″N 74°00′28″W
- Construction started: 1964
- Completed: 1966

Height
- Roof: 630 ft (190 m)

Technical details
- Floor count: 44
- Floor area: 907,495 sq ft (84,309.0 m^{2})
- Lifts/elevators: 25

Design and construction
- Architect: Alfred Easton Poor

Home Insurance Plaza is a 630 ft (190 m) tall skyscraper at 59 Maiden Lane in the Financial District of Manhattan, New York City. It was completed in 1966 and has 44 floors. Alfred Easton Poor designed the structure, while the plaza was redeveloped in 1987 by Kohn Pedersen Fox.

The plaza is the home of Liberty, a 75-by-50-foot (23 m × 15 m) mural by Julie Harvey. Simple in its concept, it illustrates that New York's present was built upon the foundations its forefathers placed many years ago. The Statue of Liberty is reflected in the mirrored facade of a skyscraper. Early 19th century New York emerges revealing the cobblestone streets, horses and carriages, gentlemen with top hats, and ships in the seaport. Harvey has also included the old shipping barrels, lamp posts and even pigs that ran freely around Lower Manhattan. The Liberty mural was presented to the community as a visual expression of the foundations on which New York was established.

== Tenants ==
- New York State Comptroller
- AmTrust

== See also ==
- List of tallest buildings in New York City
