= Soldiers and Sailors Memorial Auditorium =

1920s venue in Chattanooga, Tennessee, US

Coordinates: 35.04795°N 85.30566°W

- U.S. National Register of Historic Places
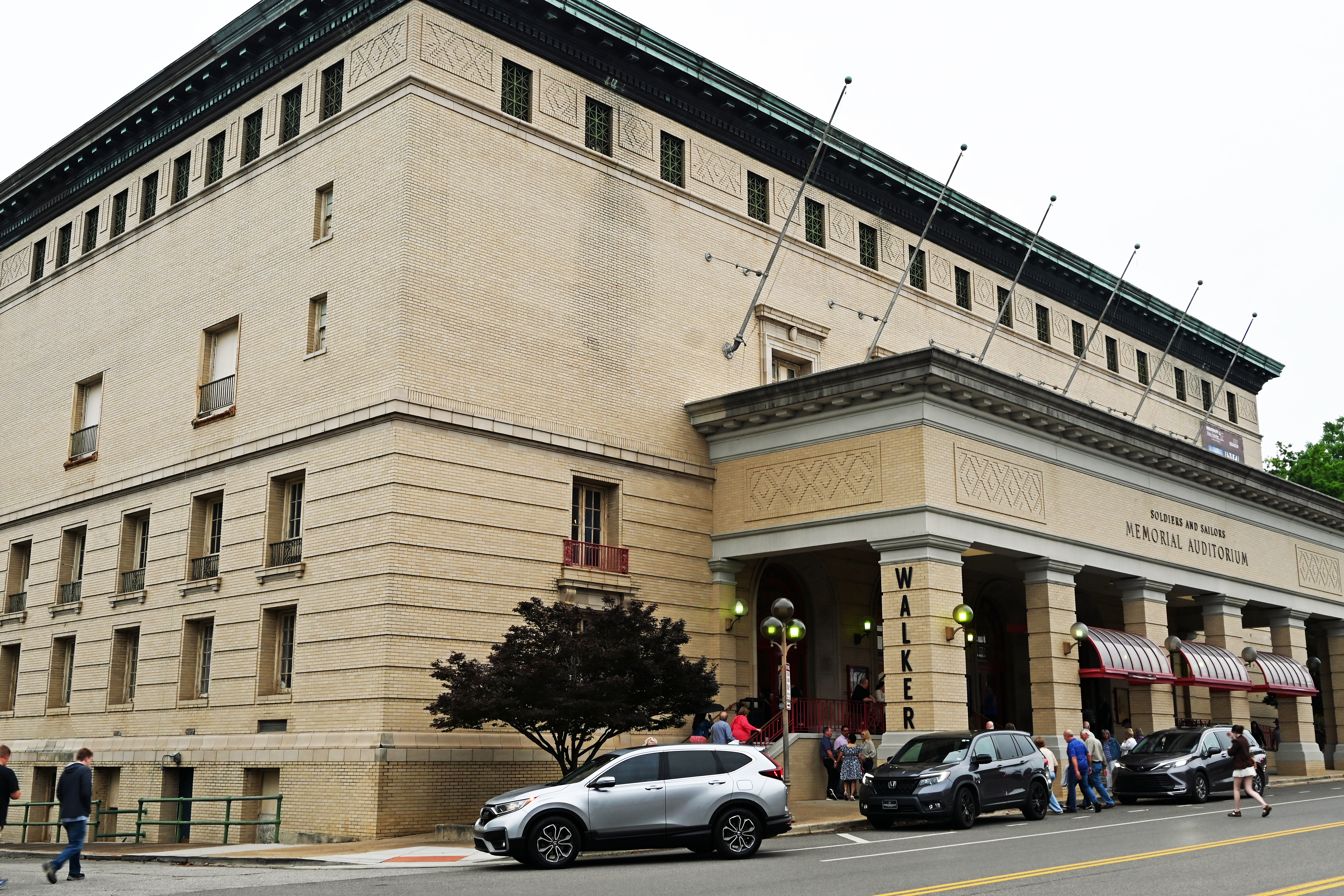
- Location: McCallie Ave. Chattanooga, Tennessee
- Architect: Reuben H. Hunt
- Architectural style: Classical Revival
- MPS: Reuben H. Hunt Buildings in Hamilton County TR
- NRHP reference No.: 80003823
- Added to NRHP: September 15, 1980

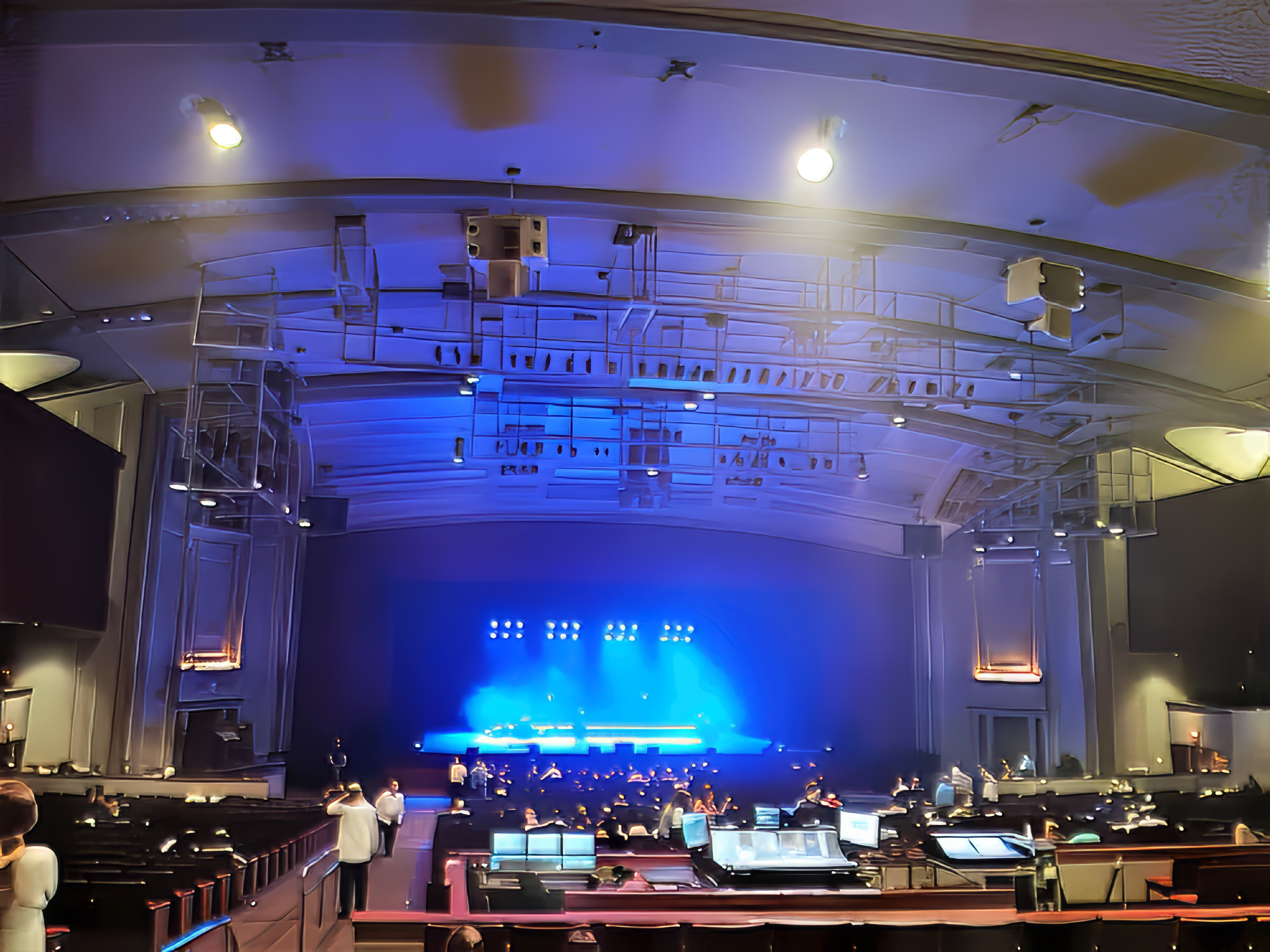
Inside the larger auditorium

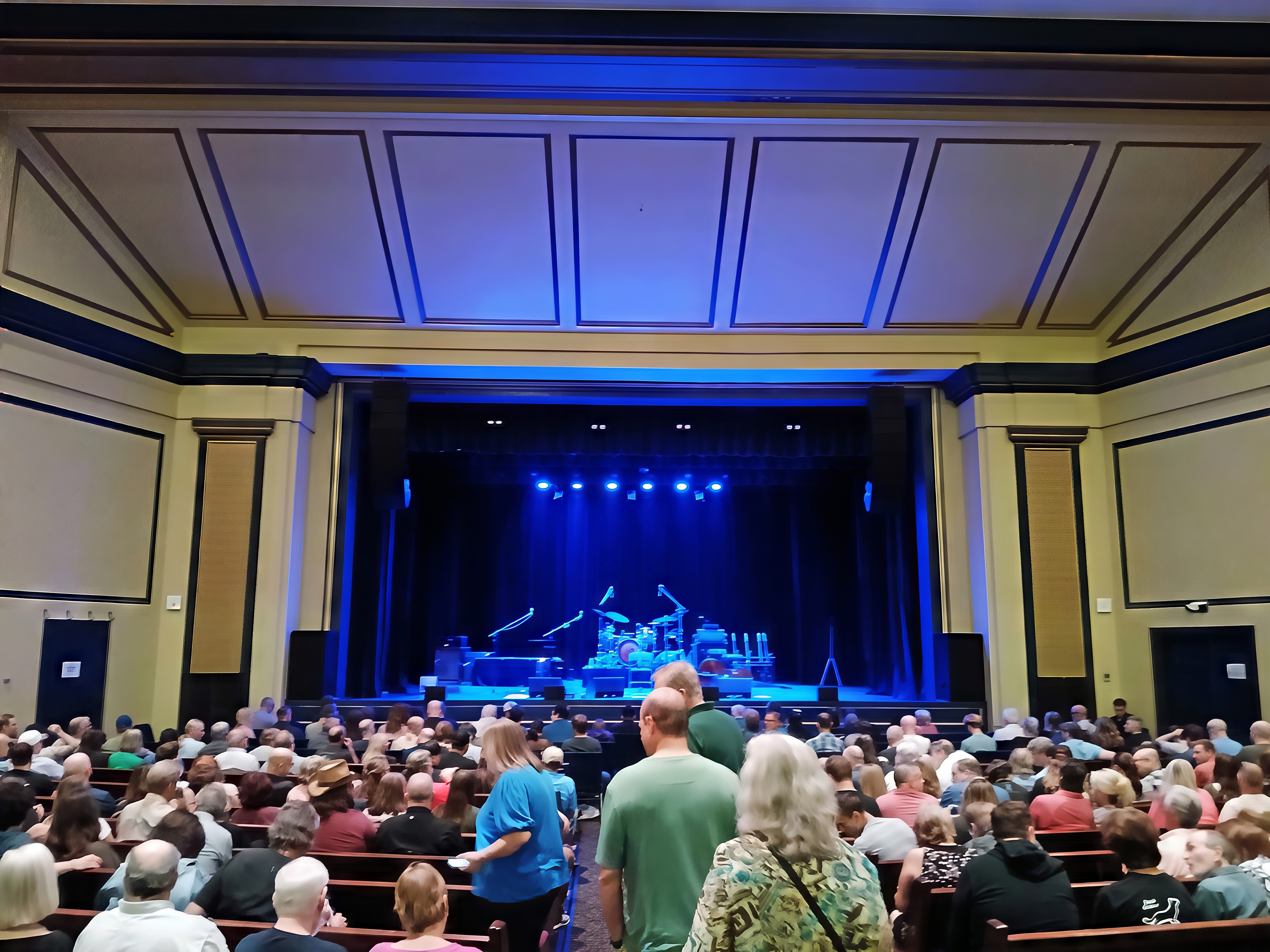
Inside the Walker Theater

The Soldiers and Sailors Memorial Auditorium is a historic performance hall in Chattanooga, Tennessee, United States. Built between 1922 and 1924 by John Parks (John Parks Company, General Contractors) at a cost of $700,000 and designed by noted architect R. H. Hunt, who also designed Chattanooga's lavish Tivoli Theatre, the theater honors area veterans of World War I.

The building, located at 399 McCallie Avenue is about halfway between downtown and the UT Chattanooga campus. It occupies half of the city block bounded by McCallie Avenue, Lindsay Street, Oak Street and Georgia Avenue.

The building contains two theaters; the lower one (Memorial Auditorium) seats 3,866 and the upper one (The Walker Theatre) seats 851. There is also a small trade show convention hall in the basement that measures 9,600 square feet (890 m^{2}).

By the early 1960s, Memorial Auditorium had fallen into disrepair. The building was closed in 1965, and reopened after renovations the following year. It closed again in 1988 for further restoration and modernization. The repairs cost over $7 million and Memorial Auditorium reopened in 1991.

In 1975, the auditorium's board of directors found themselves before the United States Supreme Court, as they had been sued by the producers of the musical Hair who were denied permission to stage their show because of its nudity. The case was known as Southeastern Promotions, Ltd. v. Conrad 420 U.S. 546. Justice Harry Blackmun, writing for the court, held that the prohibition on staging the musical was an illegal prior restraint. Also in 1975, Kiss made its first headline-act performance here on September 10 for their then-released Alive! album.

For over 85 years, the venue has hosted religious festivals, political rallies, debutante galas, opera, musicals and concerts. It continues to be an important cultural attraction for the city, and a key part of its history. In July 2007, the auditorium's historic concert pipe organ, dating to the building's construction, was rededicated after restoration by the Chattanooga Music Club over a period of 21 years. Efforts are now underway to insure the instrument's continued use and preservation.

Starting in February 2012, renovation began on the smaller community theater located upstairs. It had been closed for over a year primarily due to handicap accessibility issues. A concession stand will be added, bathrooms will be overhauled, and finally, accessibility will be improved with adding an elevator to reach the floor where the theater is housed. Architect Bob Franklin is leading the design.
