= Alfred Easton Poor =

American architect (1899–1988)

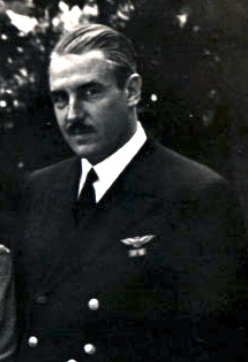
- Born: May 24, 1899; Baltimore, MD
- Died: January 13, 1988 (aged 88); New York, NY
- Education: Harvard University, A.B., 1920; University of Pennsylvania, B. Arch., 1923; M. Arch., 1924
- Occupation: Architect
- Buildings: Jacob K. Javits Federal Building; James Madison Memorial Building, US Library of Congress
- Projects: Wright Brothers National Memorial

Alfred Easton Poor (May 24, 1899 – January 13, 1988) was an American architect noted particularly for buildings and projects in New York City and in Washington, D.C., for the U.S. government.

A son of Charles Lane Poor, Alfred Poor served in the U.S. Navy in World War I and in the U.S. Navy Reserve in World War II.

As a student at the University of Pennsylvania, he studied under Paul Philippe Cret.

Poor served as the president of the National Academy of Design in New York from 1966 to 1977, organizing its 150th anniversary in 1975. He has been called "one of America's most prominent twentieth century architects" and a "prominent member of the international school of modern architecture."

== Projects ==
Over his long career, Poor's projects included public and private-sector works. Along with fellow New York architect Robert P. Rogers, Poor won the open international design competition for the Wright Brothers National Memorial in 1928.

For the U.S. government, he worked on a project that restored and extended the East Front of the US Capitol building in the early 1960s, and was also a leading architect in designing the US Library of Congress' James Madison Memorial Building, the third-largest public building in Washington.

Poor was especially active in the New York City area. His projects include the Jacob K. Javits Federal Building, the Queens County Courthouse and prison in Kew Gardens, the Home Insurance Company Building, and the 40-acre Red Hook housing projects.

Poor was chosen by Walter Annenberg to design the Annenberg School for Communication at the University of Pennsylvania. His work was also part of the art competitions at the 1932 Summer Olympics and the 1936 Summer Olympics.

According to his obituary in The New York Times, he also "designed dozens of branch offices in Manhattan and abroad for the Chemical, National City and Marine Midland banks" and "designed a number of Long Island country homes." Other works include the Cape Cinema, in Dennis, Massachusetts.

== Books ==
Poor's books about historical architecture include Formal Design in Minor French Buildings - The Tuileries Brochures (1931) and Colonial Architecture of Cape Cod, Nantucket and Martha's Vineyard (1932).
