= First Horizon Bank Building =

Skyscraper in Chattanooga, Tennessee, US

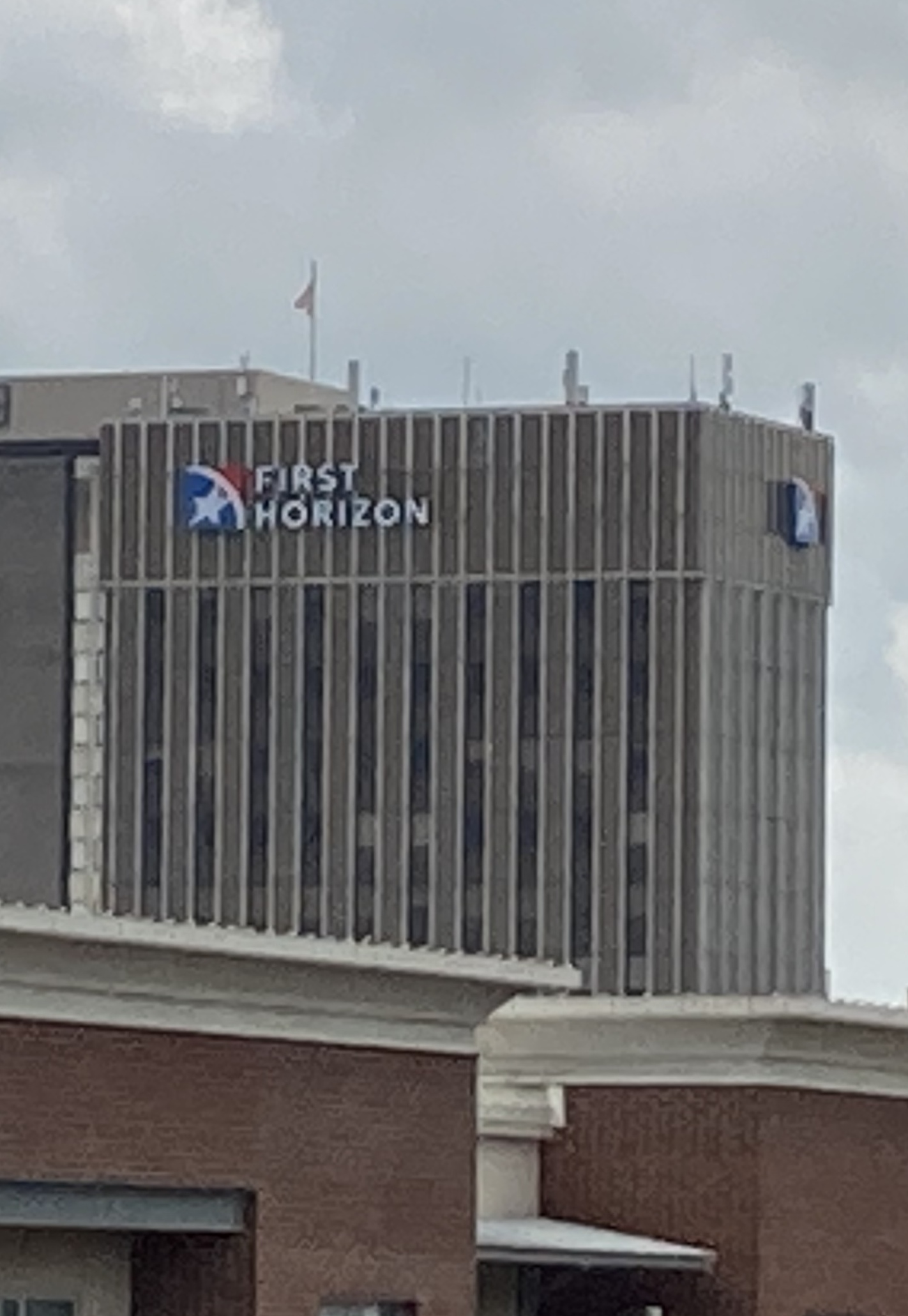
- 736 Market Street and Heritage Hamilton Apartments, Chattanooga (cropped) The First Horizon Bank Building in 2024
- Interactive map of the First Horizon Bank Building area
- Former names: First Tennessee Bank Building, Hamilton National Bank Building

General information
- Status: Completed
- Type: Mixed-use
- Architectural style: Modern
- Location: 701 Market Street, Chattanooga, Tennessee, United States
- Coordinates: 35°02′53.66″N 85°18′35.44″W
- Completed: 1911
- Renovated: 1966

Height
- Roof: 210 ft (64 m)

Technical details
- Floor count: 17

The First Horizon Bank Building (formerly known as the First Tennessee Bank Building and as the Hamilton National Bank Building) is a 210 ft (64 m) tall modern mixed-use building located on 701 Market Street in Downtown Chattanooga, Tennessee. The building has 17 floors and was built in 1911. Upon its completion, it became the tallest building in Chattanooga, surpassing the 179 ft (55 m) tall, James Building which held the title since 1907. The building would stay the tallest building in Chattanooga until 1968, when it was surpassed by the 251 ft (77 m) tall, Truist Tower. As of August 2026, the building is the 4th-tallest building in Chattanooga.

== History ==
Plans for the building were announced in 1909. Built for Hamilton National Bank, it became Chattanooga's third skyscraper, with the James Building being the first, and Hotel Patten (now Patten Towers) being the second. The building was designed by Reuben Harrison Hunt, who also designed the beforementioned James Building, the Asbury Chapel, and the Hamilton County Courthouse; he also served as the local associate architect for the beforementioned Hotel Patten.

From 1965 to 1966, the building would undergo renovations. Included with these renovations was the replacement of the building's original beaux-arts facade with a modernist granite and aluminum facade.

In 1976, Hamilton National Bank failed and its assets were sold at auction to First Tennessee Bank.

In 2016, Memphis based real estate development company, Heritage Land and Development bought the building. From 2016 to 2018, they converted most of the building, except for the first four floors, so that First Tennessee Bank (now known as First Horizon Bank) could continue operations there, into apartments.

The building would go up for sale in 2025.

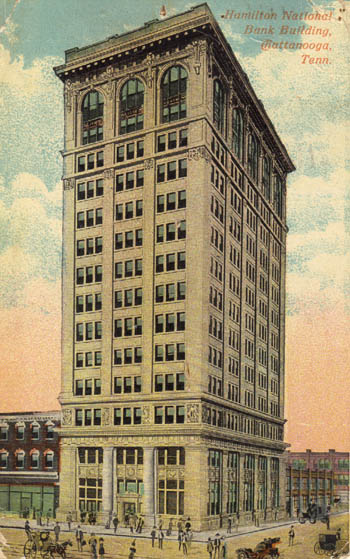
A postcard from 1917. It depicts the building before the 1966 renovation.

== See also ==
- Truist Tower
- Second Presbyterian Church (Chattanooga, Tennessee)
- Joel W. Solomon Federal Building and United States Courthouse
- Tivoli Theatre (Chattanooga, Tennessee)
- Soldiers and Sailors Memorial Auditorium
