= Tivoli Theatre (Chattanooga, Tennessee) =

Historic theatre in Chattanooga, Tennessee, US

- U.S. National Register of Historic Places
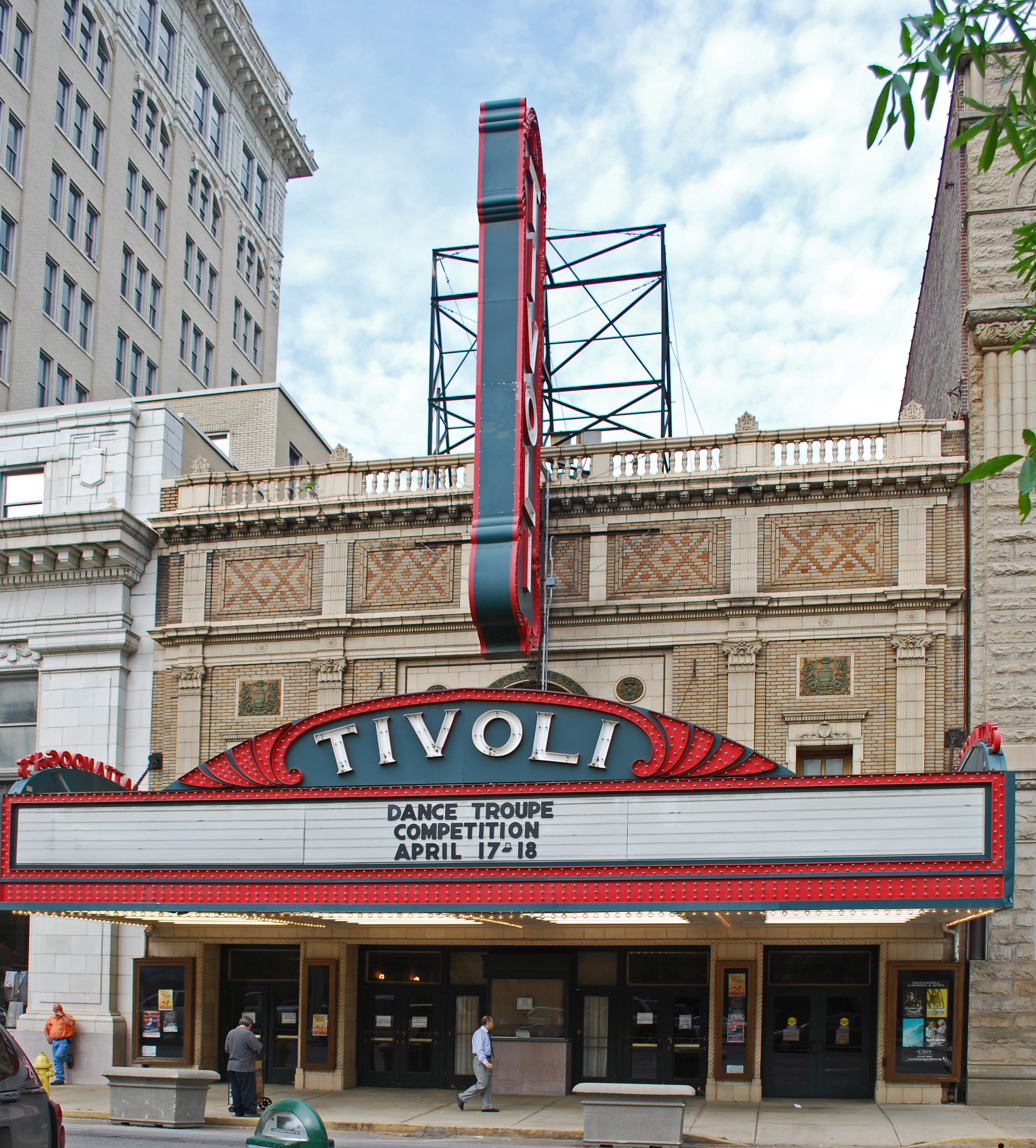

- Location within Tennessee Location within the United States
- Location: 709 Broad Street; Chattanooga, Tennessee
- Coordinates: 35°2′52″N 85°18′37″W
- Built: 1919-1921
- Architect: R. H. Hunt; Rapp and Rapp
- Architectural style: Beaux Arts
- MPS: Reuben H. Hunt Buildings in Hamilton County TR
- NRHP reference No.: 73001779
- Added to NRHP: April 11, 1973

The Tivoli Theatre, also known as the Tivoli and the "Jewel of the South", is a historic theatre in Chattanooga, Tennessee, that opened on March 19, 1921. Built between 1919 and 1921 at a cost of $750,000, designed by famed Chicago-based architectural firm Rapp and Rapp and well-known Chattanooga architect Reuben H. Hunt, and constructed by the John Parks Company (general contractors), the theatre was one of the first air-conditioned public buildings in the United States. The theatre was named Tivoli after Tivoli, Italy, has cream tiles and beige terra-cotta bricks, has a large red, black, and white marquee with 1,000 chaser lights, and has a large black neon sign that displays TIVOLI with still more chaser lights.

== Specifications ==
The building seats 1,012 in the orchestra, 48 in upper boxes, 78 in the loge, 312 in the upper balcony, 312 in the lower balcony, and 104 in removable orchestra pit seating. Therefore, the Tivoli can hold more than 1,750 people.

The stage's depth is 44 feet (13 m) and 99 feet (30 m) long. The ornately decorated silver and gold proscenium's width is 47 feet and 8 inches (14.3 meters and 20.3 cm) and is 26 feet (7.9 m) high.

The Tivoli has had two music systems in its lifetime. When the theatre opened in 1921, a Bennett Pipe Organ was used and then replaced in 1924 with a $30,000 Wurlitzer organ. The organ, also known as the Mighty Wurlitzer Theatre Pipe Organ 235 Special, was installed in order to produce live music to accommodate silent films and stage productions. The Mighty Wurlitzer Organ is still playing almost a century later.

== History ==
Reflecting the Beaux Arts architectural style prevalent in late 19th century and early 20th century America, the theatre contains a high rose-and-gold coffered ceiling, the original box office, a grand lobby with a white terrazzo floor inlaid with forest-green marble and music-motif medallions, crystal chandeliers, an elegant foyer, and red velvet-plush chairs. The primary colors of the dome panels and medallions in the outer lobby were blue and red with a salmon and gold background. The Tivoli opened at 1 p.m. on March 19, 1921 for an entire day dedicated to multiple concerts by the Tivoli Symphony, screenings of Cecil B. DeMille's 1921 film Forbidden Fruit, and a personal appearance by Forbidden Fruit's Mae Murray, all for the price of 15 to 55 cents. Professor Spencer McCallie and Mayor Chambliss, both iconic people of Chattanooga, were presented to the public during this opening and gave speeches on their admiration for the theatre. This presentation marked the opening of the Tivoli Theatre. The theater served Chattanooga well for several decades as the chief location for stage and film entertainment in Chattanooga, but went into a steady decline as modern movie theaters started to appear in Chattanooga in the 1950s. The last film to be shown in the Tivoli was Snow White and the Three Stooges on August 17, 1961. The theater closed in the same year and reopened on March 5, 1963 as Chattanooga's new Cultural Center.

The Tivoli was, at one time, owned by ABC and was later leased to Chattanooga as a performing arts facility. The theatre was placed on the National Register of Historic Places in April 1973. The city of Chattanooga purchased the Tivoli in 1976 for $300,000 after the theater had been in disrepair for some years; Chattanooga's Department of Education, Arts, and Culture currently owns and operates the Tivoli.

In 1979, Chattanooga-based Lyndhurst Foundation gave a $25,000 grant to the then-Chattanooga Arts Council, which is now Allied Arts of Greater Chattanooga, for a feasibility study on restoring the Tivoli. Other grants for renovation included $3.5 million given by Tennessee in 1986, $3.2 million raised by a private campaign by Chattanoogans, and $300,000 given by the city government.

After the Tivoli closed on June 5, 1987 for renovations, which were directed by Robert A. Franklin, the Tivoli reopened on March 29, 1989 with a recital by Marilyn Horne. These renovations included new dressing rooms to hold up to 70 performers, and an increase in the stage depth by 14 feet.

== First program ==
Tivoli opened on March 19, 1921 with a total of five shows. The first show was at 1 p.m., beginning with the Overture of Orpheus and a personal appearance of Mae Murray. Following this opening was the first viewing of Forbidden Fruit. The second show, at 3 p.m., began similarly with the Overture of Orpheus by the Chattanooga Symphony, but then also incorporated a Prologue of A Cinderella Fantasy and another appearance of Mae Murray, before the second viewing of Forbidden Fruit. The 7 p.m. show incorporated A Cinderella Fantasy along with the Orpheus the Overture, but it also featured toe dancers, impersonators, and readers. Following this show was the third viewing of Forbidden Fruit. At 9 p.m., Mae Murray along with the Forbidden Fruit cast visited for an appearance and the formal opening and dedication of the Tivoli theatre. This then led into the fourth viewing of Forbidden Fruit. The fourth and final viewing of the night was identical to that of the 3 p.m., and thus began the 1921 success of the Tivoli Theatre.

== The making of a Historic Site ==
Tivoli Theatre was added to the National Register of Historic Places on April 11, 1973. Its condition was marked as good with few signs of neglect. The American Made Mighty Wurlitzer theatre pipe organ, which was installed in 1931, was still present, and the rest of the theatre was checked as unaltered. The Tivoli theatre was considered a significant landmark for many reasons including its reputation for being the "finest theater in the entire South," and that it became the first theater to have air conditioning in the South and the first of five Carrier Plants in the United States. Its period of significance was marked, by the National Register, as most significant from 1875 to 1899 due to the building's architectural features.

== Famous movies and shows that have played at the Tivoli ==
Some famous actors, actresses, movies, and shows that have played at the Tivoli are listed below:

- Mae Murray
- Louis Armstrong
- Fanny Brice
- Lynn Fontanne
- Helen Hayes
- Marilyn Horne
- Alfred Lunt
- Joe Bonamassa
- Idiot's Delight
- Mary of Scotland
- The Old Maid
- The Earl Carroll Vanities
- The Greater Marcus Show
- The Ziegfeld Follies
- Snow White and the Three Stooges
