= Hamilton County Courthouse (Tennessee) =

Historic place in Tennessee, United States

- U.S. National Register of Historic Places
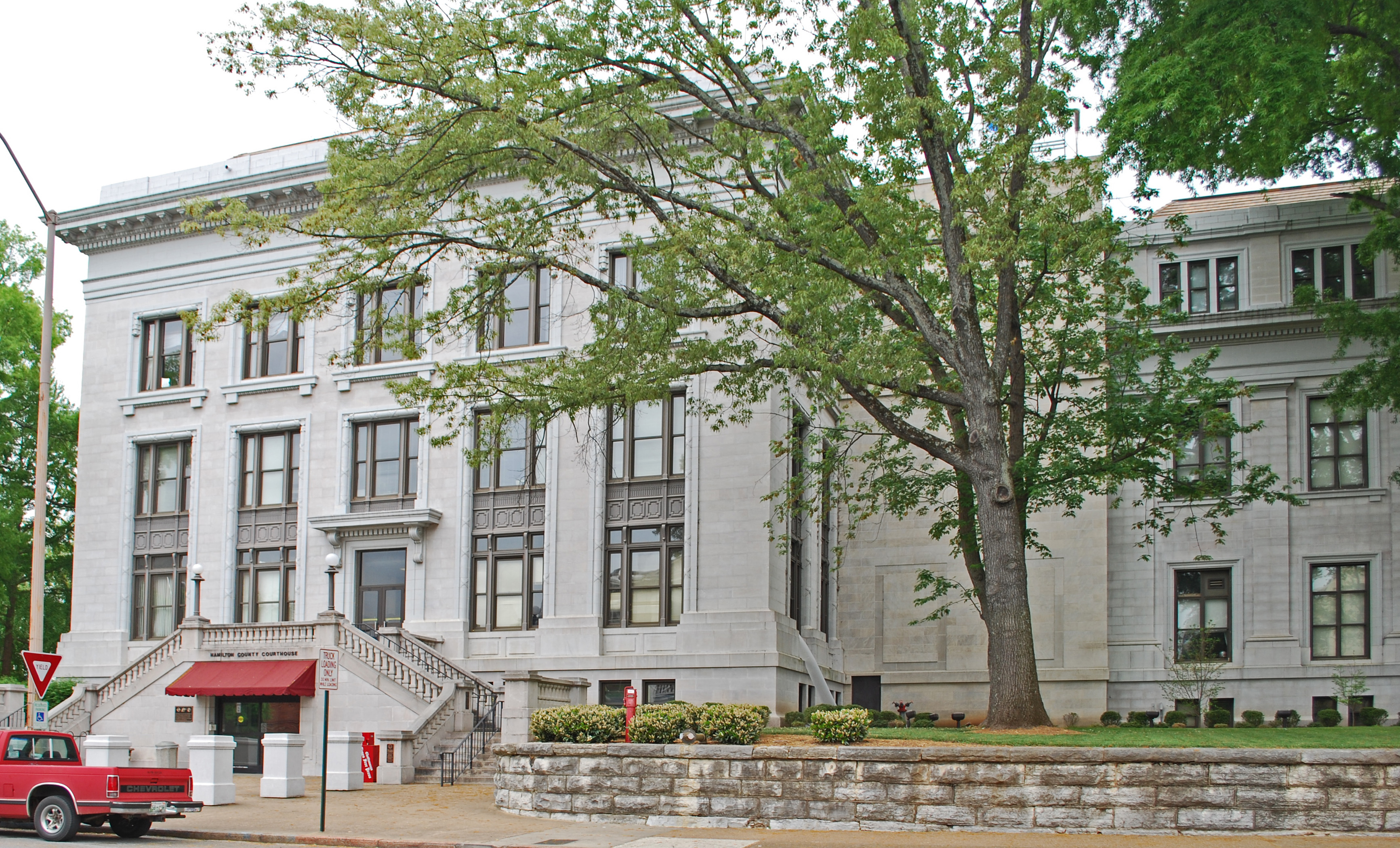

- Location within Tennessee Location within the United States
- Interactive map showing the location of Hamilton County Courthouse
- Location: W. 6th St. and Georgia Ave., Chattanooga, Tennessee
- Coordinates: 35°02′58″N 85°18′25″W
- Area: 2.6 acres (1.1 ha)
- Built: 1912
- Architect: R.H. Hunt
- Architectural style: Classical Revival
- MPS: Hunt, Reuben H., Buildings in Hamilton County TR (AD)
- NRHP reference No.: 78002596
- Added to NRHP: November 21, 1978

The Hamilton County Courthouse in Chattanooga, Tennessee, designed by architect R.H. Hunt, was constructed in 1912. It was listed on the National Register of Historic Places in 1978.

It is three stories upon a basement.

A statue of Confederate general Alexander P. Stewart was unveiled on the courthouse grounds on April 22, 1919 by the United Daughters of the Confederacy.
