= Second Presbyterian Church (Chattanooga, Tennessee) =

Historic church in Tennessee, United States

- U.S. National Register of Historic Places
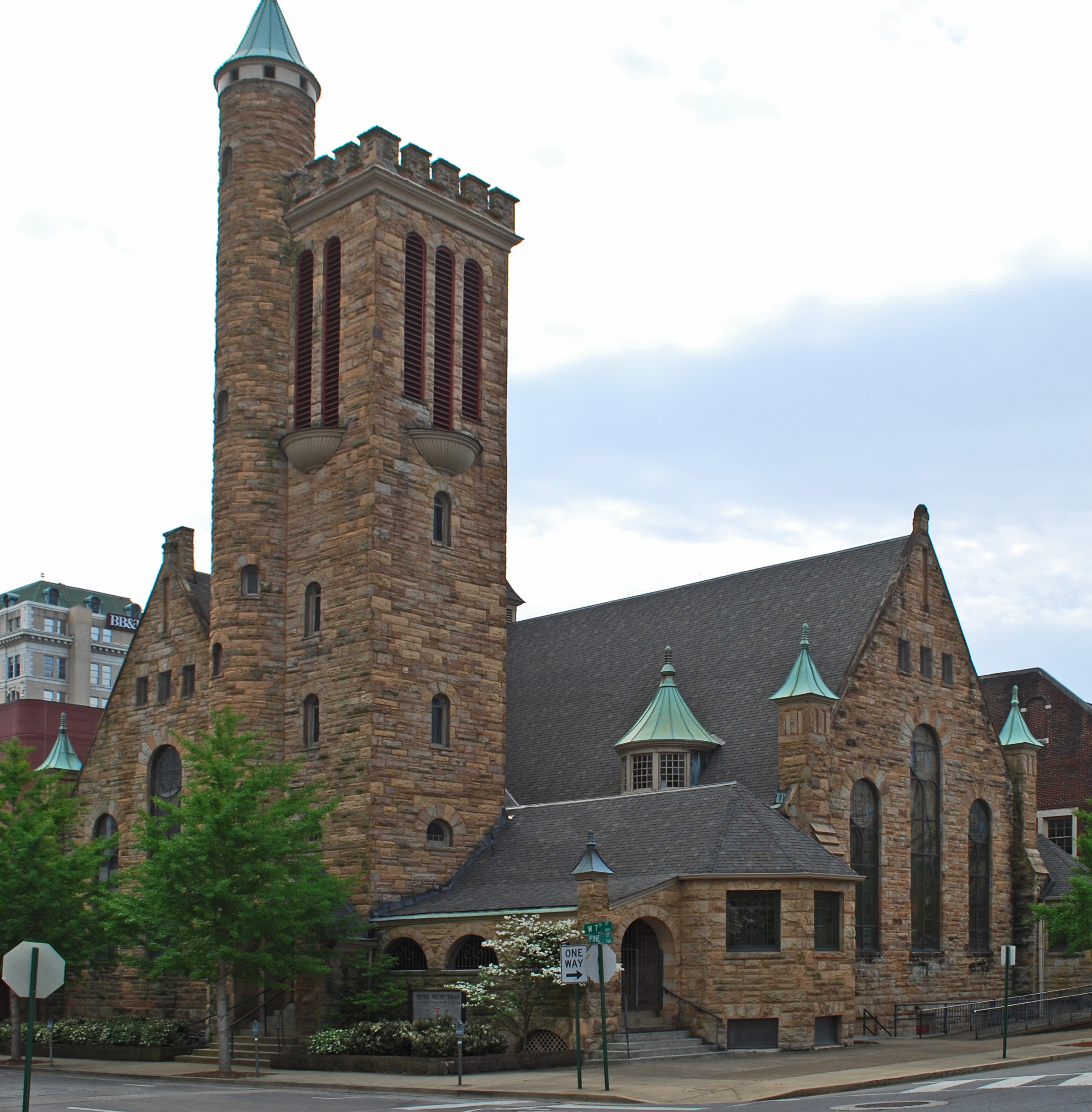

- Location within Tennessee Location within the United States
- Location: 700 Pine St., Chattanooga, Tennessee
- Coordinates: 35°2′53″N 85°18′45″W
- Area: 1 acre (0.40 ha)
- Built: 1890
- Architect: Hunt, Reuben Harrison
- MPS: Hunt, Reuben H., Buildings in Hamilton County TR
- NRHP reference No.: 80003822
- Added to NRHP: February 29, 1980

Second Presbyterian Church is a historic church at 700 Pine Street in Chattanooga, Tennessee, affiliated with Presbyterian Church USA.

The Gothic Revival building, designed by Reuben Harrison Hunt, was built in 1890. It is the oldest building designed by Hunt that is still extant in Chattanooga. It was added to the National Register of Historic Places in 1980.

Since 1984, the undercroft of the church's main building has been used as a homeless shelter, operated as a cooperative project of Second Presbyterian Church and St. Paul's Episcopal Church. St. Matthew's Men's Night Shelter started as a winter-only emergency shelter for homeless men. It now operates year-round to provide overnight housing for men who are participating in a rehabilitative program, such as the program of the Chattanooga Community Kitchen.
