= Henry County Courthouse (Tennessee) =

Courthouse in Paris, Tennessee

Coordinates: 36.3023°N 88.3259°W

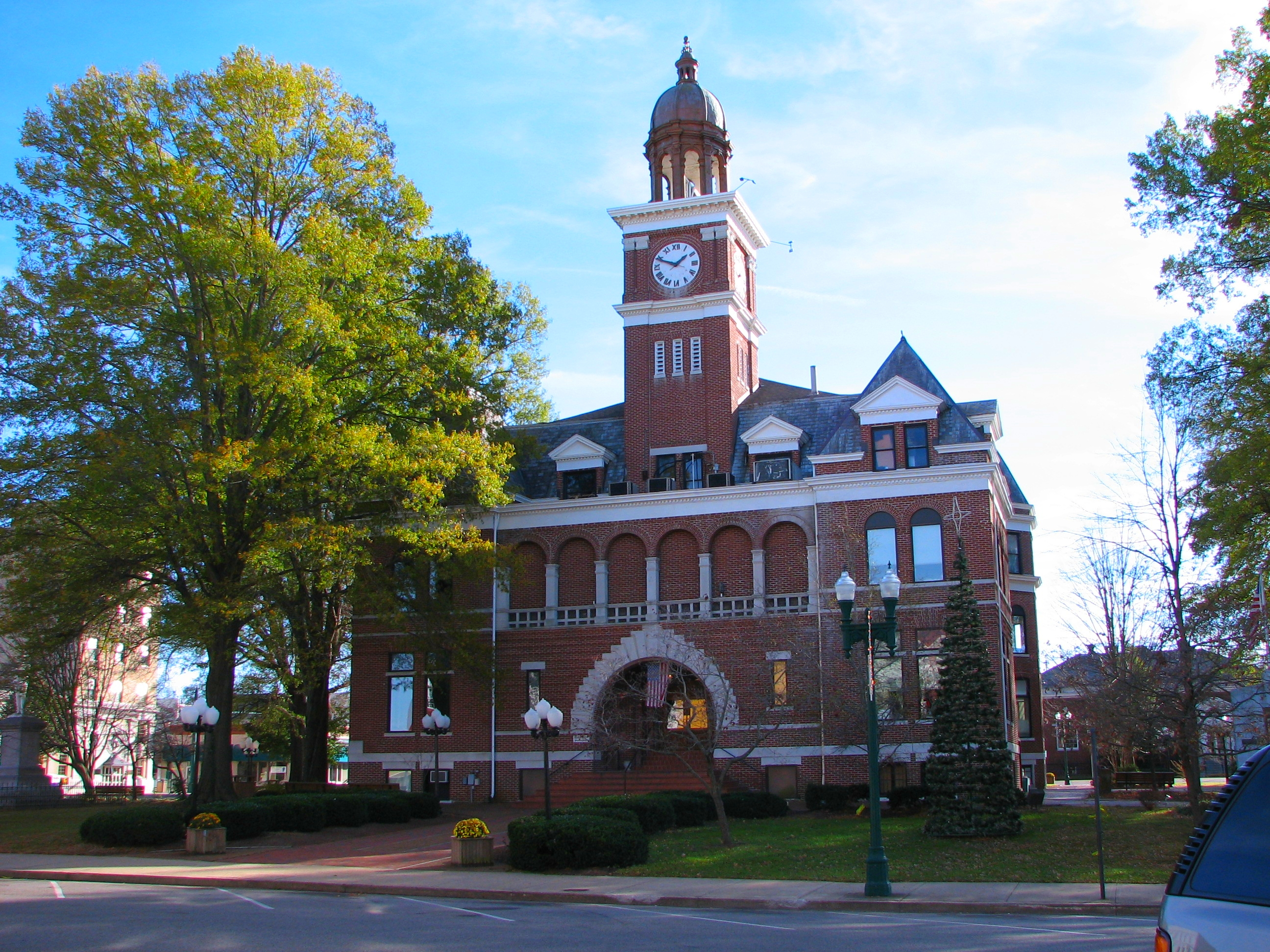
Henry County Courthouse, 26 November 2005

The Henry County Courthouse is located on court square in Paris, Henry County, Tennessee. The current building, which was completed in 1896, is Henry County's fourth courthouse.

== Current (1896) Courthouse ==
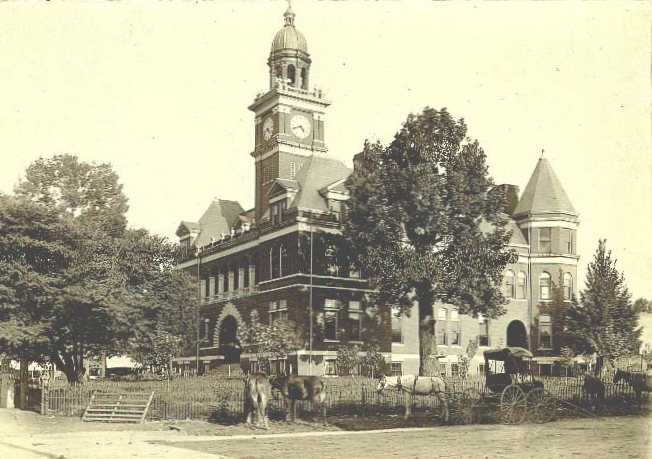
Henry County Courthouse, circa 1900

The current building is the fourth to serve in this capacity and the third to occupy the current location. The cornerstone was laid in 1896 and the courthouse was first occupied on October 2 of that year.

The building was designed by Chattanooga architect Reuben Harrison Hunt in the Richardsonian Romanesque style. The design is extremely similar to Hunt's Elbert County Courthouse in Elberton, Georgia which was completed about a year prior.

Upon completion, the building contained three courtrooms, twelve offices, five fire-proof vaults, electric lighting, low-pressure steam heating and a complete plumbing and draining system. The clock tower is indicated to be 113 feet (34 m) tall. The tower clock features four dials and strikes a bell on the hour and half-hour.

Renovations include the addition of an elevator, air conditioning and several other modernizations. Some of the original interior woodwork survives, including doors, balustrades and banisters.

Two staircases in the north corners of the building reach to the third floor where a viewing gallery or balcony looked over the second floor courtroom. This gallery and the original courtroom ceiling have been obscured by a new drop ceiling making air conditioning possible.

Portraits hanging in the central hallway depict Patrick Henry, the county's namesake, and the three Tennessee governors who made their home in Paris: Isham Green Harris, James Davis Porter and Thomas Clarke Rye.

The courthouse lawn features several trees (three of which are dedicated to the governors mentioned above), a monument to the county's Confederate soldiers called the "Private of '61" and a Veteran's Memorial bearing the names of Henry County soldiers lost in the service of their country.

=== Tower clock and bell ===
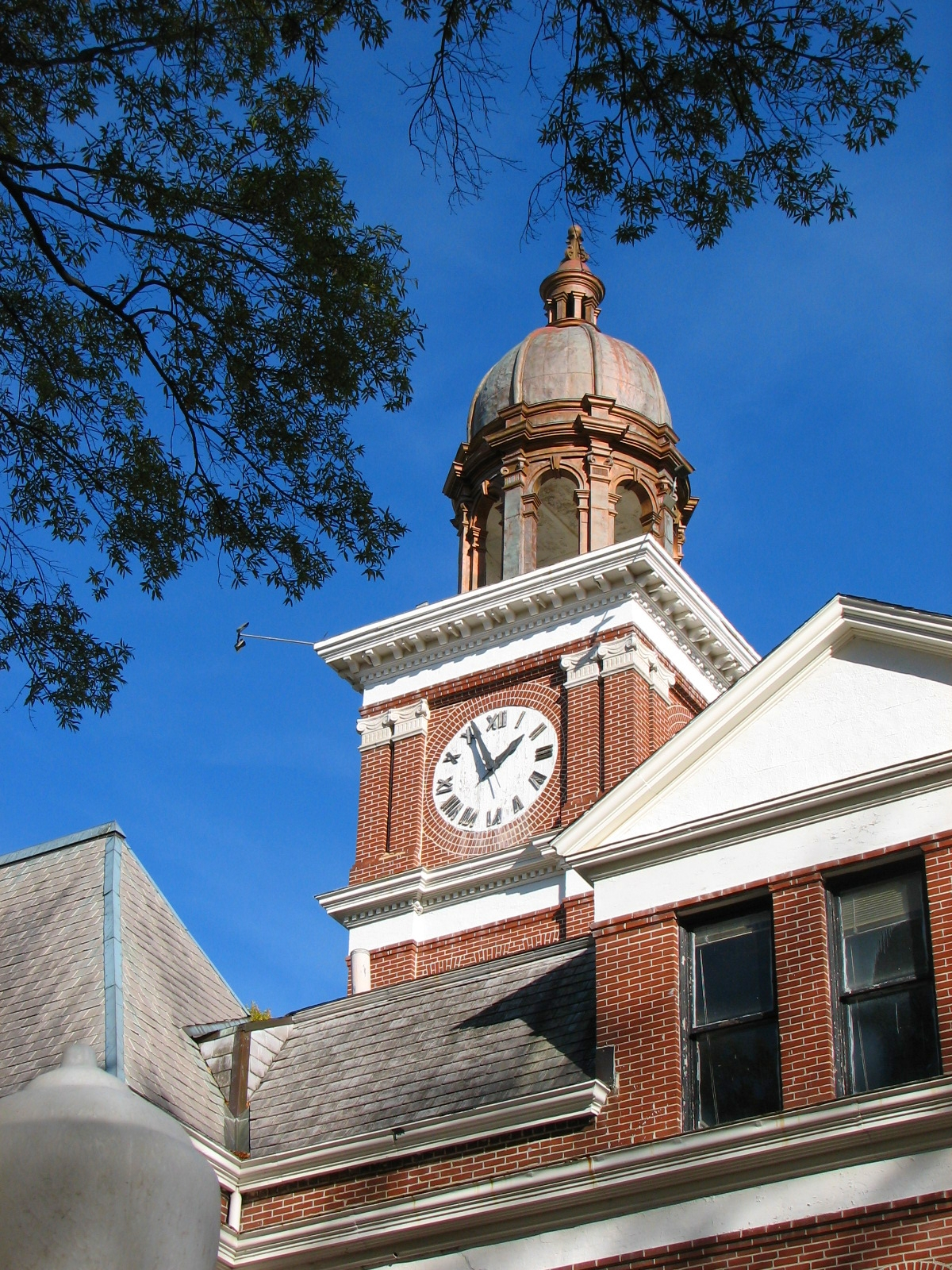
Clock Tower, west-facing dial, 26 November 2005

The tower clock, a "No. 1 Striker," was ordered on 4 August 1896 via jeweler J. P. Jones from the E. Howard Clock Company. $670 was paid for the clock, hands and figures, 10% of which was given to Jones. The order shipped from the Howard factory on 19 August 1896 just less than a week ahead of schedule.

Originally, two weights would have driven the time and strike trains. The clock would have been rewound manually on a weekly or semi-weekly basis. Rather than the customary cylindrical weights made of metal or concrete, the weights were actually wooden boxes filled with horseshoes and other scrap metal and built into vertical tracks. In the 1950s, the clock was electrified and now two motors drive the time and the strike trains.

The bell was cast by William Kaye of Louisville, Kentucky. The alloy is said to contain the metal of several silver dollars donated by the citizens of Paris to give it a clearer sound. It was originally installed in the dome-shaped belfry of the Odd Fellows Female Institute, located at the corner of Market and McNeill streets in Paris, sometime after 1854. While installed at the institute, it rang for the school's purposes as well as for the Baptist church and for funerals. Six years after this building burned in 1890, the bell was installed under the cupola of the new courthouse.

=== Cornerstone ===
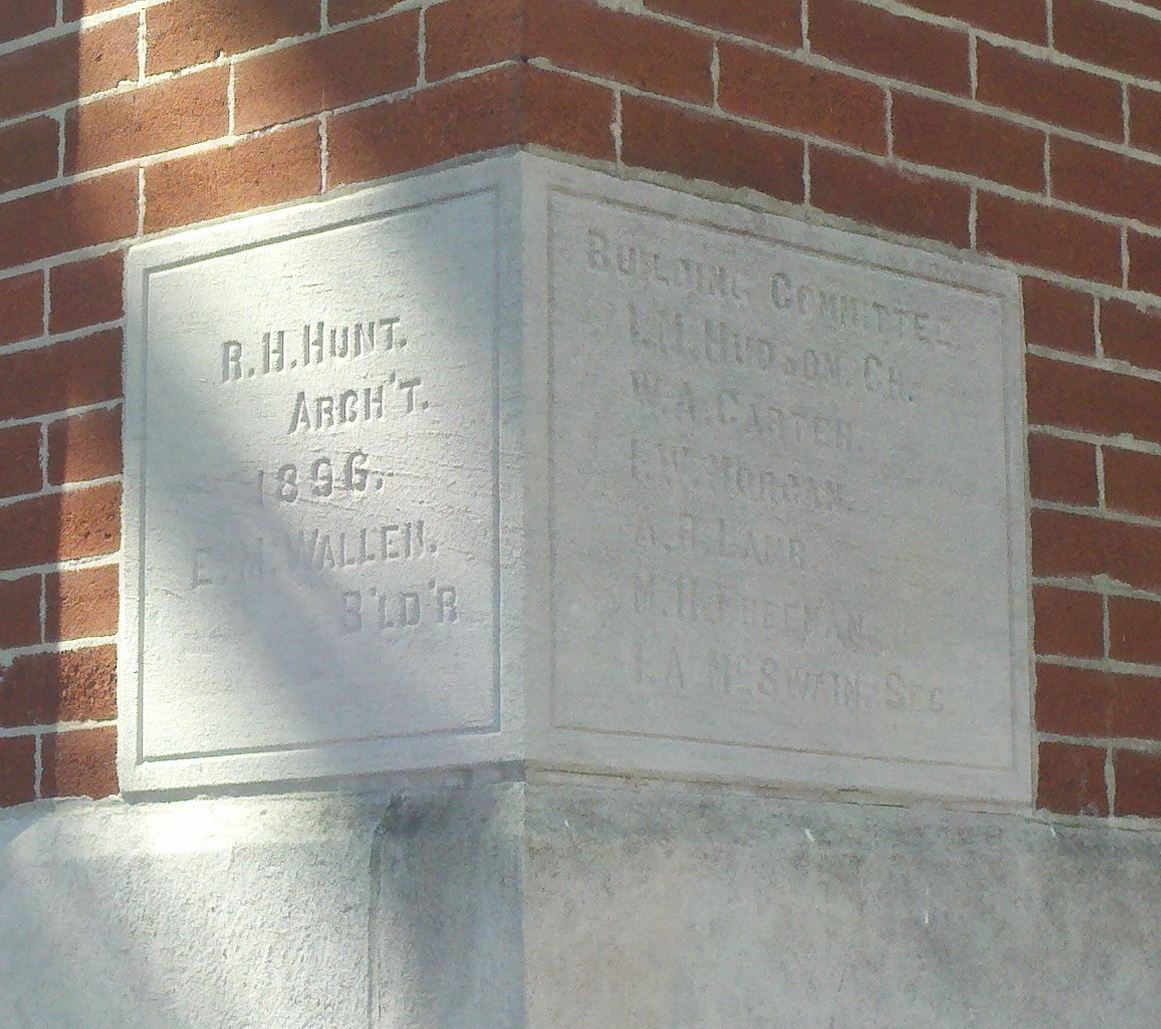
Cornerstone of 1896 courthouse

The cornerstone is found on the northeast corner of the building. On its east-facing side, the name R. H. Hunt is indicated as architect and E. M. Wallen as builder along with the year 1896. On its north-facing side are the names of the building committee: I. M. Hudson, Chairman; W. A. Carter; I. W. Morgan; A. B. Lamb; M. H. Freeman; and I. A. McSwain, Secretary.

== Previous courthouses ==
=== 1823 Courthouse ===
The first courthouse was built in 1823 in the Clifty community of Henry County, south of Paris. The structure was built with poplar logs in a dogtrot configuration. The Court of Pleas and Quarter Sessions was held in the north room while a member of the chamber of commerce sold pies and liquor in the south room.

=== 1825 Courthouse ===
In 1825, some two years after Paris was established as the county seat and the planned city had been laid off with streets and blocks, a small two-story brick courthouse was built in the center of town. John Burke and Francis McConnell built this structure at a cost of $143. This building stood until 1850.

=== 1852 Courthouse ===
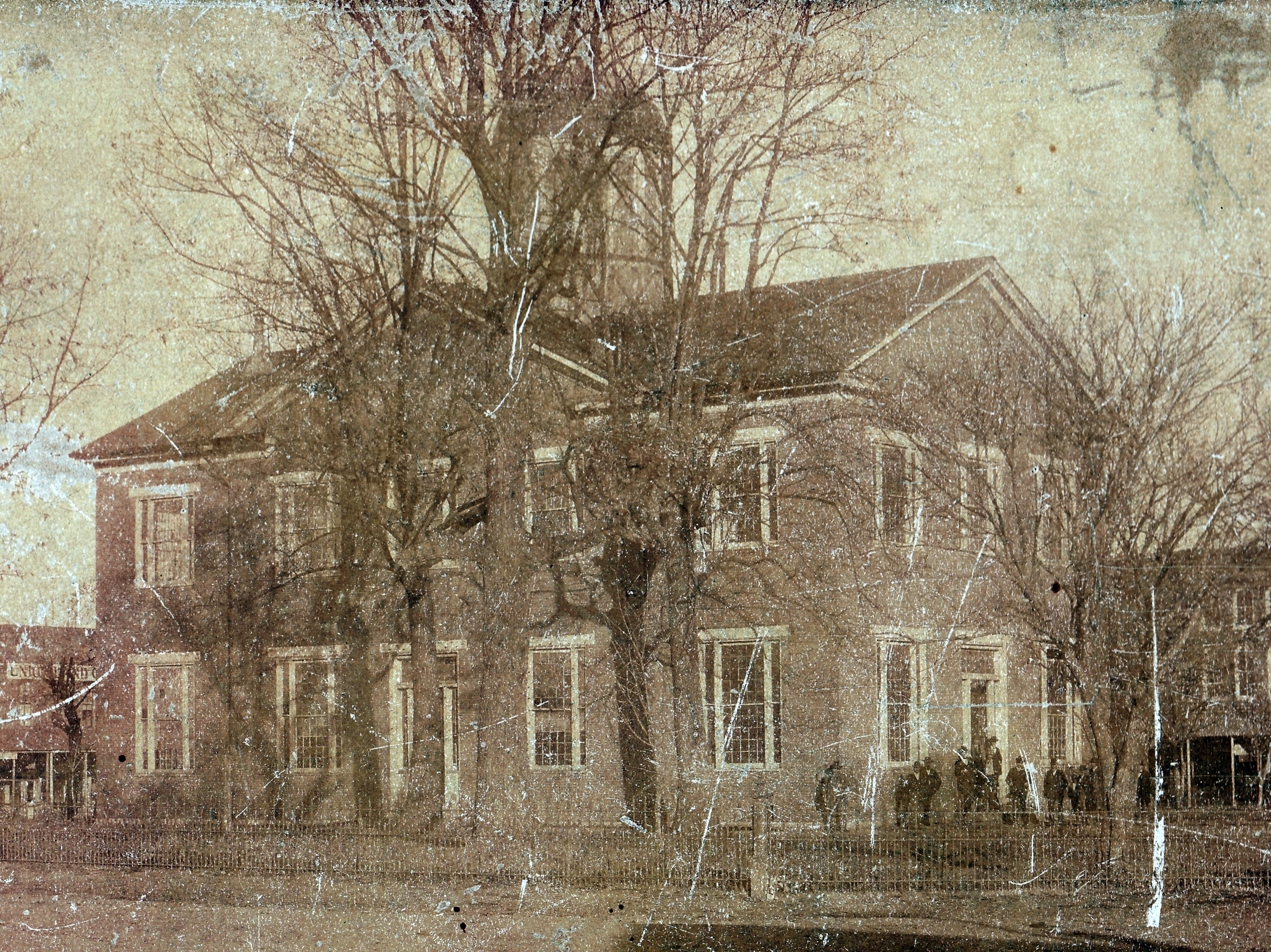
Third Henry County Courthouse (built 1852), as it appeared circa 1890

The third courthouse, designed by John Ora, was built by Calvin Sweeney at a cost of $42,000 and completed in 1852. The building was made of red brick, had two stories and included a central hall and dome. It was rectangular, the two longer facades facing north and south, and had a cross-gabled roof. A public well was located on the west side of the courthouse lawn.

This courthouse witnessed the organizations on its lawn of the Fifth Tennessee Infantry and the Forty-Sixth Tennessee Infantry of the Confederate States Army.

The Battle of Paris ensued west of the city on 11 March 1862 and is said to have ended with Federals retreating eastward through the town with Confederates in pursuit.

On 1 April 1862, Company F of the Fifth Iowa Cavalry arrived in Paris, commanded by Captain William A. Haw. He writes in his report:

I inquired for the key of the court-house, which was handed to me. I entered it and planted my company flag, the Stars and Stripes of our glorious country, on the top, which was received by my boys with cheers and hurrahs, but by them alone. The citizens (but a small portion of them remain) were gathering in front of their houses viewing the things going on, but their countenances showing that these acts were not indifferent to them.

Captain Haw later writes of his actions in attempt to guarantee that the flag remain:

I told them that I planted our banner over their court-house, and wished those who professed to be peaceable citizens to see that our flag was not torn down; that I expected to see it still floating there on my next visit to Paris, and that they might rest assured of being protected by us as long as they did not molest the flag, but should they disgrace that said flag they would be held responsible for their bad acts.

The flag was removed by a Confederate Captain a few days after their departure.

In 1895, this courthouse was remarked by a grand jury as needing attention. The county court instead voted to tear the building down and replace it. The resulting replacement is the courthouse that stands today.
