= Lowndes County Courthouse =

Lowndes County Courthouse may refer to:

- Lowndes County Courthouse (Alabama), Haynesville, Alabama
- Lowndes County Courthouse (Georgia), Valdosta, Georgia
- Lowndes County Courthouse (Mississippi), Columbus, Mississippi
