= Northside Presbyterian Church =

Historic church in Tennessee, United States

- Northside United Presbyterian
- U.S. National Register of Historic Places
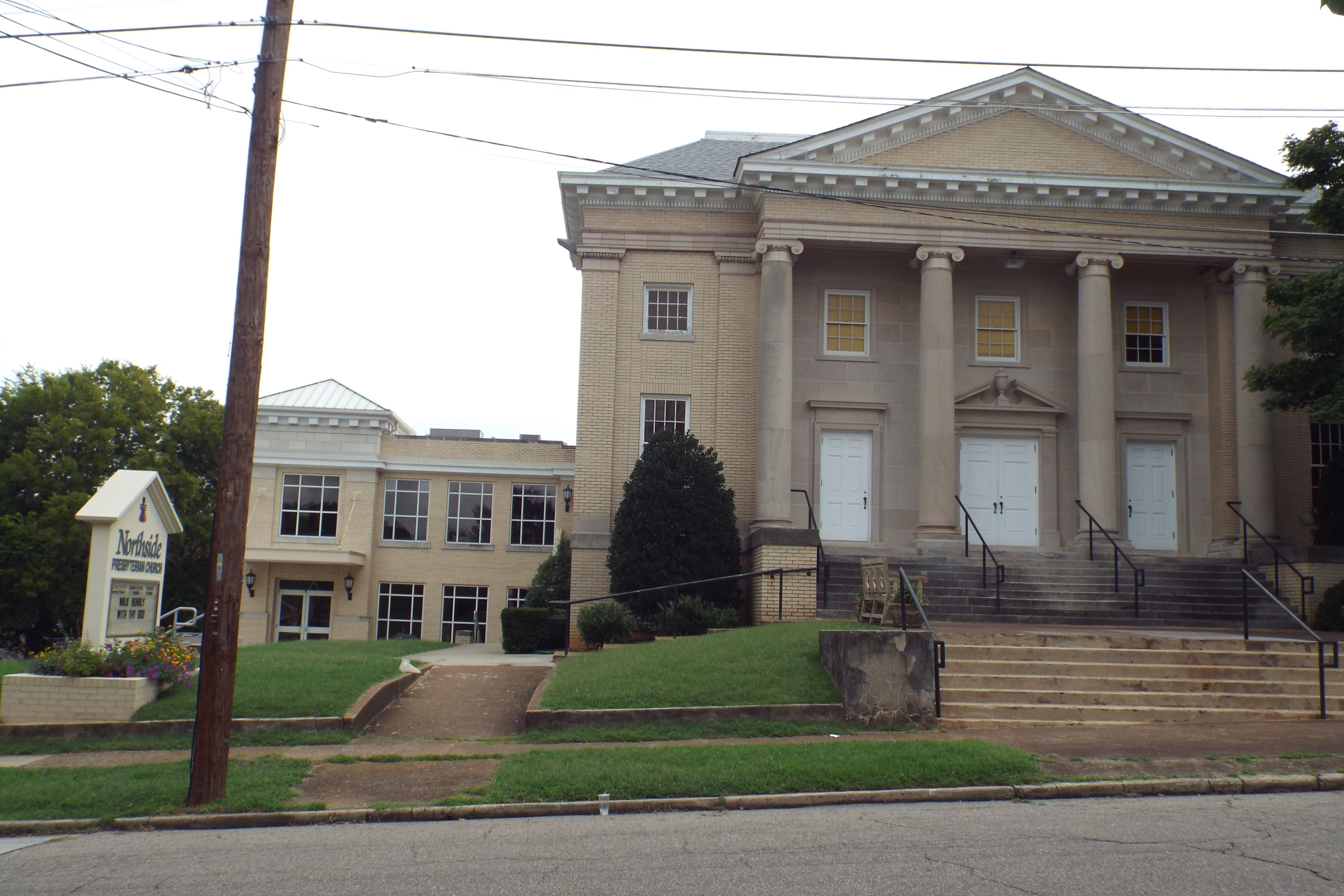
- Northside Presbyterian Church

- Location within Tennessee Location within the United States
- Location: 923 Mississippi Ave., Chattanooga, Tennessee
- Coordinates: 35°3′53″N 85°17′42″W
- Area: 2.2 acres (0.89 ha)
- Built: 1916
- Architect: Reuben Harrison Hunt
- Architectural style: Greek Revival
- MPS: Hunt, Reuben H., Buildings in Hamilton County TR
- NRHP reference No.: 80003820
- Added to NRHP: September 15, 1980

Northside Presbyterian Church is a historic Presbyterian church at 923 Mississippi Avenue in Chattanooga, Tennessee, affiliated with the Presbyterian Church USA.

The congregation was founded in 1886, and its first building was completed in 1888.

The church's current Greek Revival building, completed in 1916 at a cost of $30,000, was designed by Reuben Harrison Hunt. It is his only Greek Revival design in Chattanooga. The building includes a church school annex added in 1926 and an education building added in 1958. In the 1960s, the sanctuary was remodeled. The building was added to the National Register of Historic Places in 1980. It underwent major renovations in the 1980s and 1990s.
