= Lowndes County Courthouse (Mississippi) =

Coordinates: 33.4968°N 88.4278°W

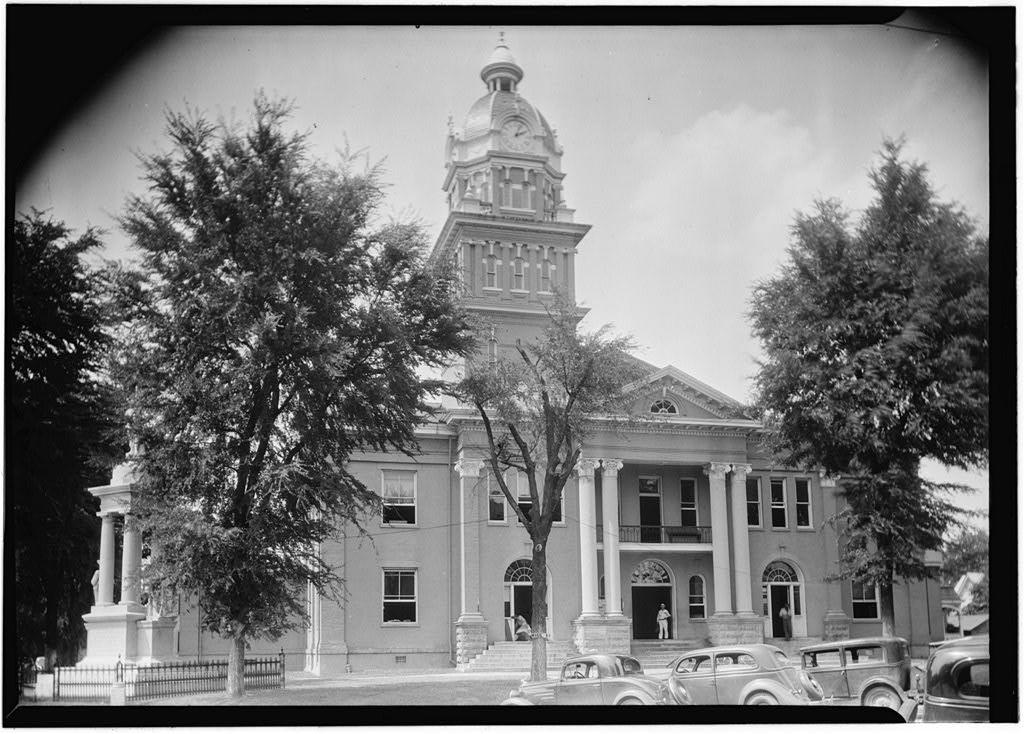
Courthouse in Columbus, Mississippi, 1933.

The Lowndes County Courthouse in downtown Columbus, Mississippi, is the seat of government for Lowndes County, in the northeastern part of the state. It was initially built in 1847 to designs of local architect James Lull and then remodeled in 1901-05 by Chattanooga-based architect Reuben H. Hunt, who also completed buildings for the Mississippi University for Women nearby at almost the same time. An addition was constructed in 1976.

== History ==
The area of Lowndes County has historically been agriculturally based, mostly on the production of cotton, since European settlement began in the early 1800s. Together with Starkville in Oktibbeha County and West Point in Clay County, it has anchored a region in northeast Mississippi known since the 1990s as the Golden Triangle. In the twentieth century, industry gradually began to overtake agriculture as the primary economic activity. Until the early twenty-first century, Columbus was the largest and most economically robust of the three cities, though Starkville is now slightly larger in population.

The courthouse is located at the northern edge of Columbus' downtown commercial district, occupying most of a block bounded on the east and west by N 6th Street and N 5th Street, respectively; and on the north and south by 3rd and 2nd Avenues, North, respectively. It faces south onto 2nd Avenue North towards a row of storefronts, which also front the block on the west. The District Attorney's offices are located in a building immediately behind it. To the north is Franklin Academy, while the buildings on both the east and south sides of the courthouse square are occupied by law offices. Parking is located on the northern half of the block on which the courthouse stands.

== Design ==
The two-story courthouse was initially built in 1847. Its current state uses an asymmetrical design. The original pedimented block at the western end has a main façade that steps forward twice from the outer walls' plane, terminating near the center in a portico supported by monumental Ionic columns in pairs on either side. Three round-arched fan-light doorways form the main entrances under and on either side of the portico, which is approached by a wide stairway from ground level. To the west of the original portico rises a square clock tower that tapers to an octagonal plan as it approaches the belfry. It is capped by a dome above the four clock faces that is in turn crowned by a small open lantern. The tower uses an Italianate style, but much of the rest of the building is solidly neoclassical. A large addition steps forward from this original portion, fronted by a flat-roofed monumental portico supported by Corinthian columns; to the east of this block, a smaller newer wing forms an L-shape, giving the entire courthouse a plan much like a blocky W-shape. Like most of the buildings in the surrounding district, the courthouse is primarily constructed of a light orange brick.
