= First Baptist Church Education Building =

Historic church in Tennessee, United States

- U.S. National Register of Historic Places
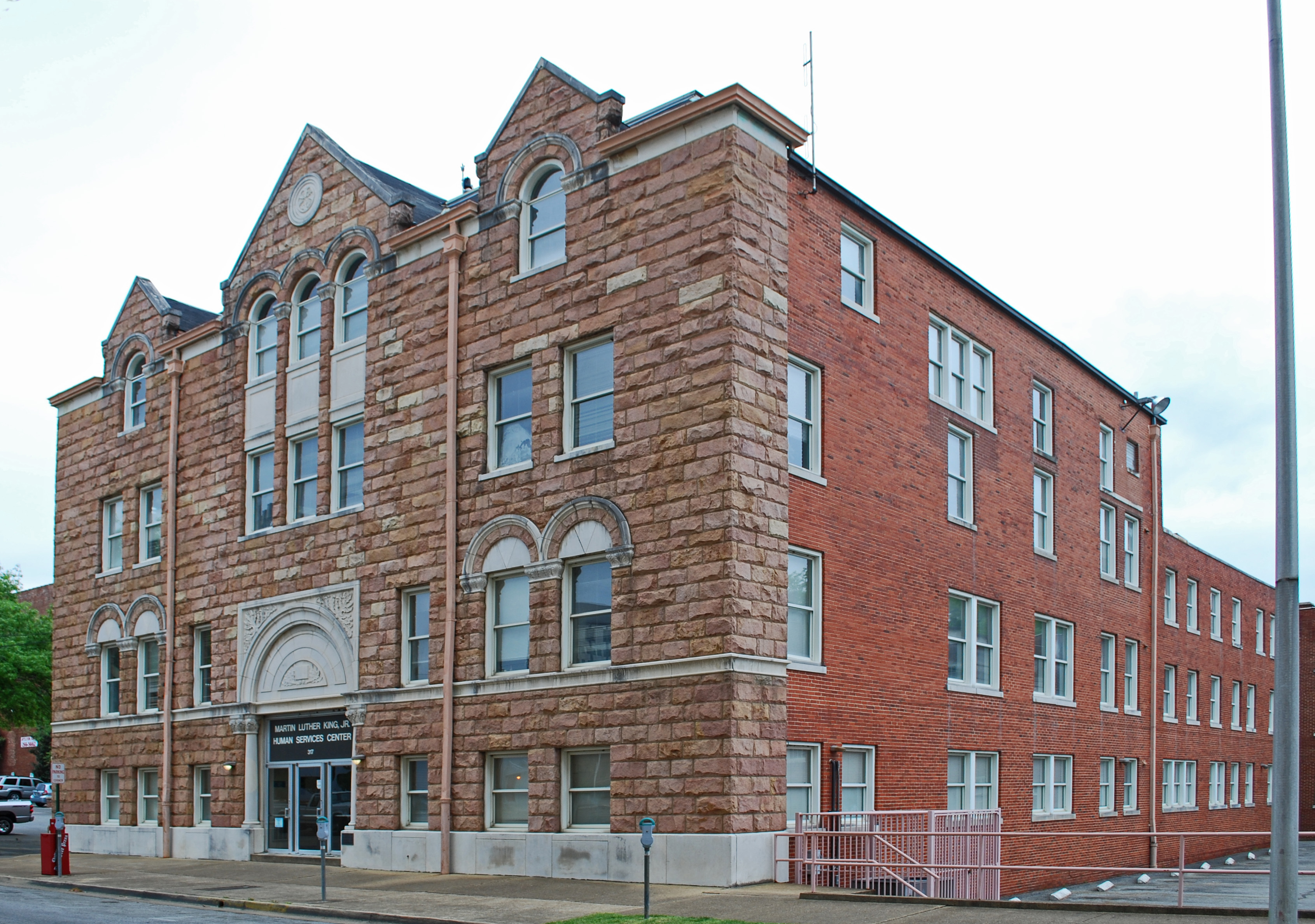

- Location within Tennessee Location within the United States
- Location: 317 Oak St., Chattanooga, Tennessee
- Coordinates: 35°2′56″N 85°18′21″W
- Area: 1 acre (0.40 ha)
- Built: 1928
- Architect: Reuben Harrison Hunt
- MPS: Hunt, Reuben H., Buildings in Hamilton County TR
- NRHP reference No.: 80003811
- Added to NRHP: February 29, 1980

First Baptist Church Education Building is a historic building at 317 Oak Street in Chattanooga, Tennessee.

It was built in 1928 to serve the congregation of the adjacent First Baptist Church, which had been built in 1886. Both buildings were designed by prominent local architect Reuben Harrison Hunt. Hunt was a member of the First Baptist Church, and the church building was his first major architectural project in Chattanooga. His design for the education building was intended to harmonize with the Romanesque design elements in the church, which was destroyed some time between 1928 and 1980.

The First Baptist Church Education Building was added to the National Register of Historic Places in 1980.
