= Nathan L. Bachman School =

- U.S. National Register of Historic Places
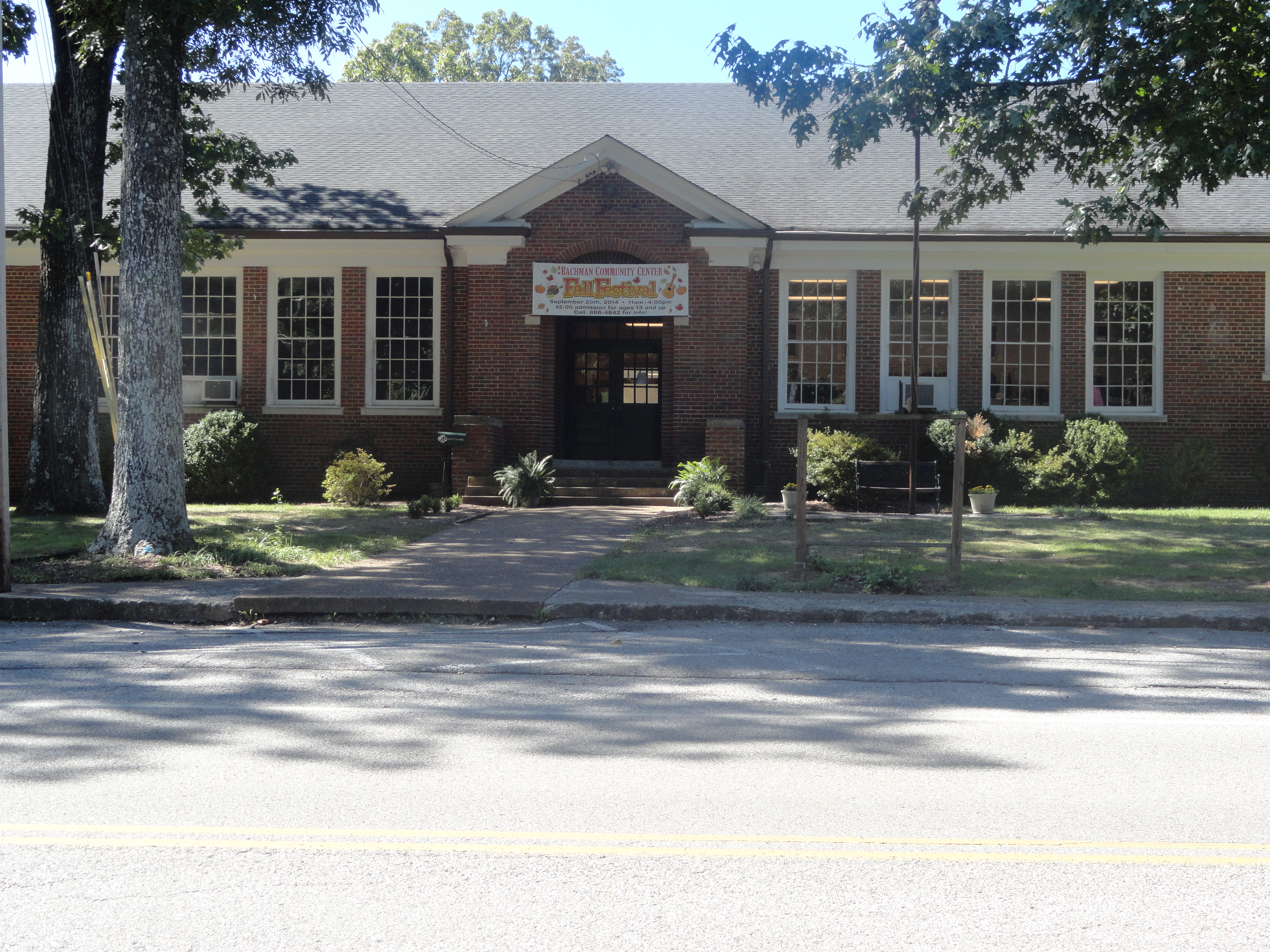

- Location within Tennessee Location within the United States
- Location: 281 Anderson Pike, Walden, Tennessee
- Coordinates: 35°9′47″N 85°19′20″W
- Area: 5 acres (2.0 ha)
- Built: 1937
- Built by: Condra, R.M. & Co.
- Architect: R.H. Hunt & Co.
- Architectural style: Colonial Revival
- NRHP reference No.: 01000381
- Added to NRHP: April 17, 2001

The Nathan L. Bachman School is a former elementary school located near Signal Mountain, Tennessee. The building was listed on the National Register of Historic Places in 2001. In 2017, it is used as the Bachman Community Center.

== History ==
The Nathan L. Bachman School was built in 1937, and designed by the firm of R. H. Hunt and Company. It was built under the Public Works Administration with funding from the Federal Emergency Administration of Public Works, at a cost of about $57,000. The school was named for Nathan L. Bachman, a prominent local lawyer and politician. It was built to replace older and obsolete schools in the area. In 1955, two additions were added to the original structure. It functioned as a school until 2000, when its students were transferred to Nolan Elementary School. It now functions as a community center under the name, Bachman Community Center.

== Architecture ==
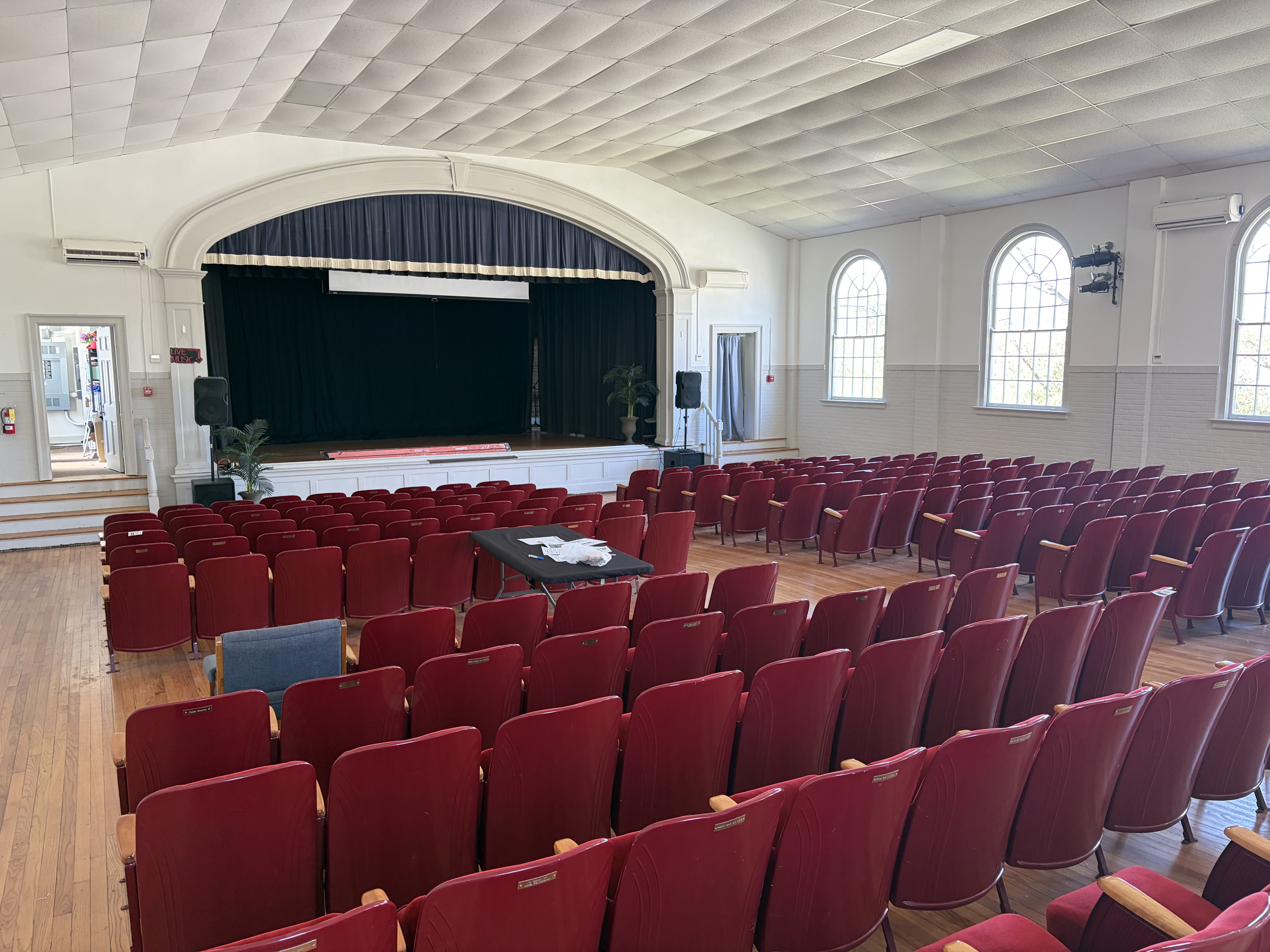
The auditorium of the Bachman Community Center

The Nathan L. Bachman School building is an example of Colonial Revival architecture. Prominent features reflective of this style include the front brick portico, fanlights over the main entrance and auditorium windows, red brick facade, multi-light window sashes, panel doors, and an overall symmetrical design, with the main entrance in the center flanked by equally-spaced windows.
