= Calvary Baptist Church (Jackson, Mississippi) =

Historic church in Mississippi, United States

- U.S. National Register of Historic Places
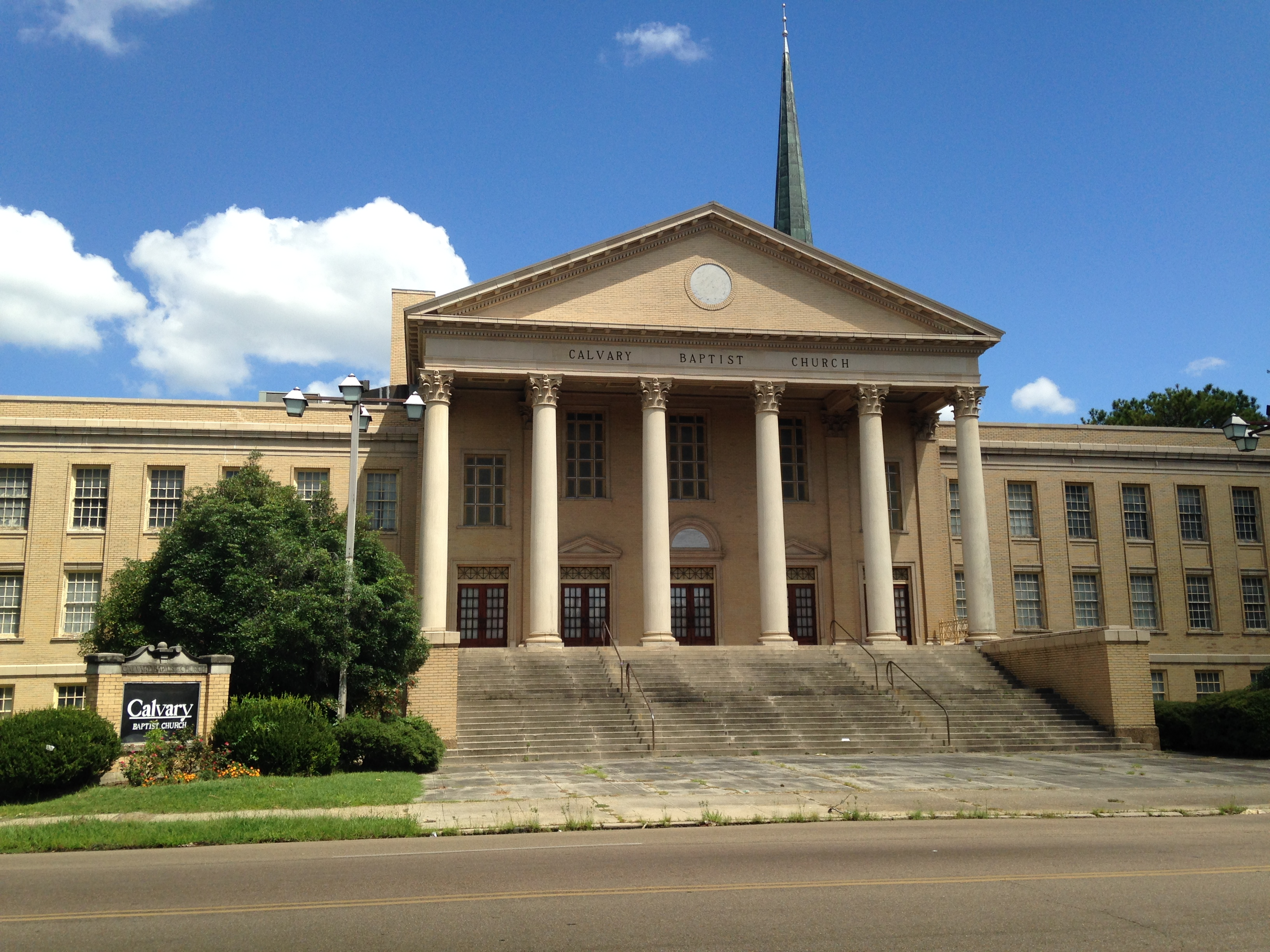
- Calvary Baptist Church in 2016

- Location within Mississippi Location within the United States
- Interactive map showing the location of Calvary Baptist Church
- Location: 1300 West Capitol Street, Jackson, Mississippi
- Coordinates: 32.308774°N 90.202420°W
- Architectural style: Classical Revival
- NRHP reference No.: 13000301
- Added to NRHP: May 14, 2013

Calvary Baptist Church is a historic church in Jackson, Mississippi, U.S.. It was designed in the Classical Revival architectural style by R. H. Hunt. It was listed on the National Register of Historic Places in 2013.
