= First Presbyterian Church (Fordyce, Arkansas) =

Historic church in Arkansas, United States

- U.S. National Register of Historic Places
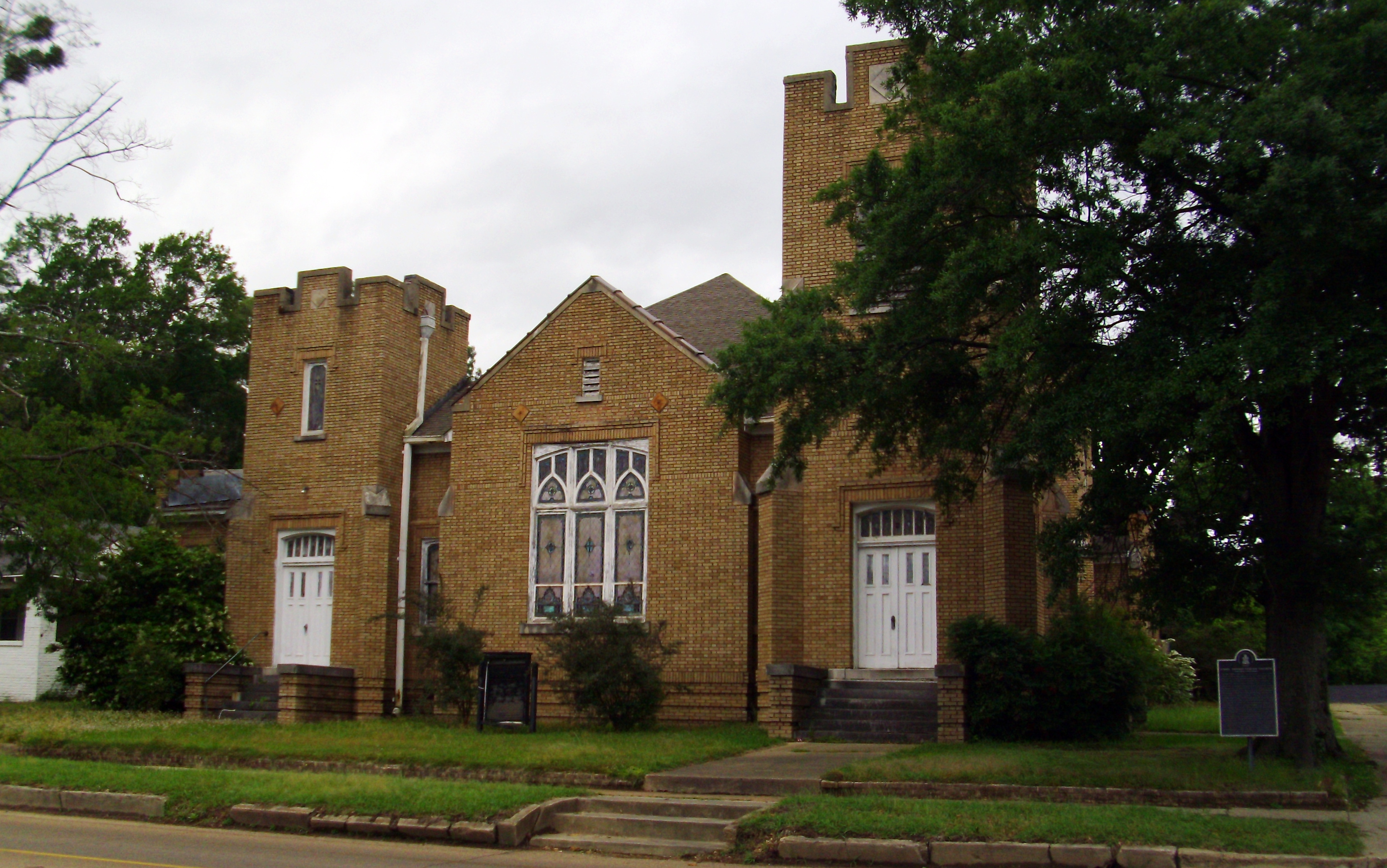

- Location within Arkansas Location within the United States
- Location: AR 79B, Fordyce, Arkansas
- Coordinates: 33°48′47″N 92°24′53″W
- Area: less than one acre
- Built: 1912
- Architect: Hunt, Reuben Harrison
- Architectural style: Late Gothic Revival
- MPS: Dallas County MRA
- NRHP reference No.: 83003468
- Added to NRHP: October 28, 1983

The First Presbyterian Church is a historic church on AR 79B in Fordyce, Arkansas. The congregation was organized in 1883, and was the first in the city of Fordyce. This building is its third sanctuary, built in 1912 to a design by Tennessee architect Reuben Harrison Hunt. It is a modest example of Gothic Revival styling executed in buff brick, with three towers.

The building was listed on the National Register of Historic Places in 1983.

The church closed in 2008. In 2018, Preserve Arkansas identified the building as one of the most endangered historical sites in the state.

== See also ==
- National Register of Historic Places listings in Dallas County, Arkansas
