= Alexandria Hall-Louisiana College =

- U.S. National Register of Historic Places
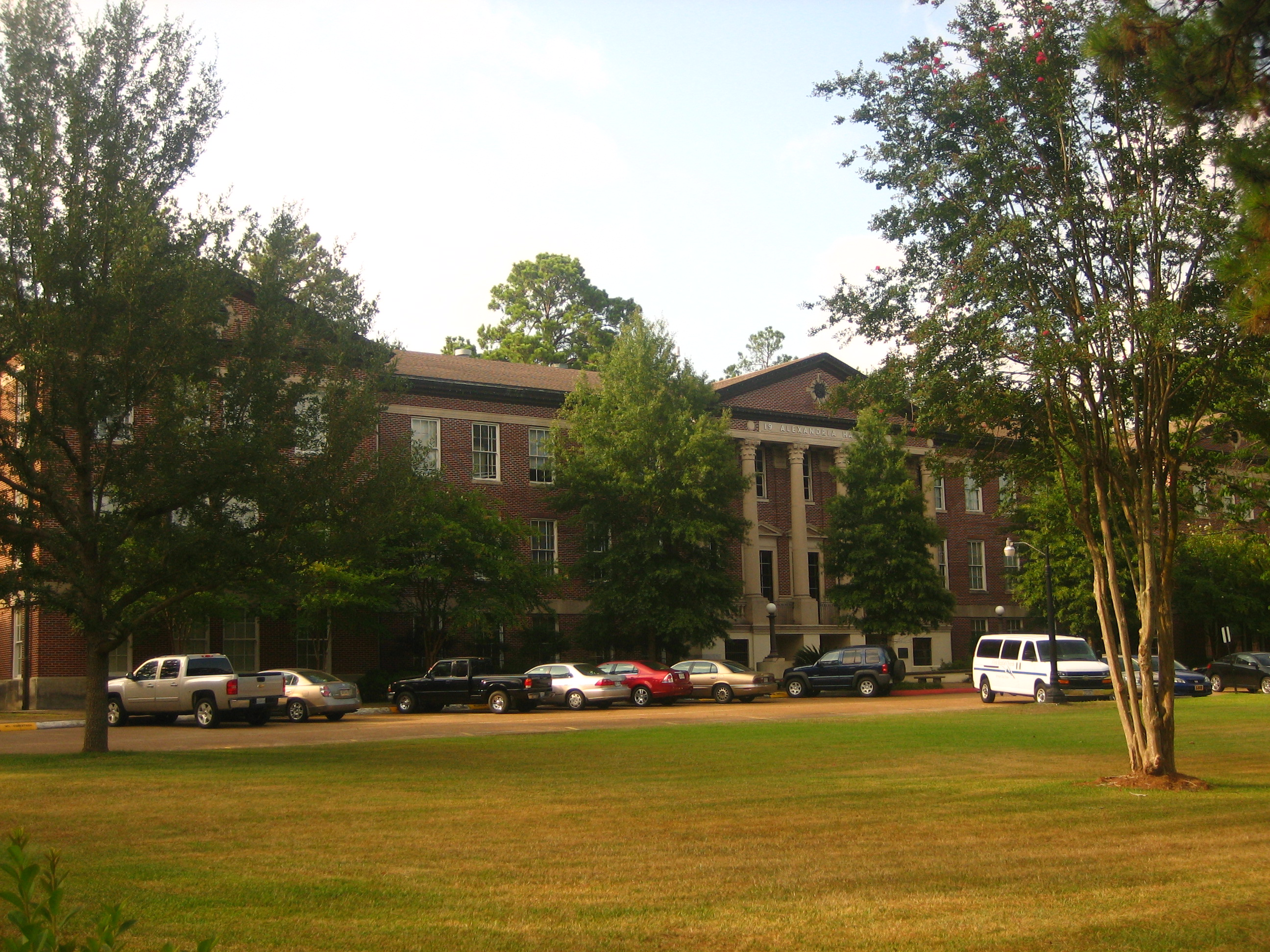
- Front of Alexandria Hall

- Location within Louisiana Location within the United States
- Location: Louisiana College, Pineville, Louisiana
- Coordinates: 31°19′31″N 92°25′36″W
- Area: 0.5 acres (0.20 ha)
- Built: 1920
- Architect: Hunt, R. H., Co.; Yeager, C. Scott
- Architectural style: Classical Revival
- NRHP reference No.: 86001059
- Added to NRHP: May 15, 1986

Alexandria Hall-Louisiana College is a Classical Revival structure built in 1920, located in Pineville, Louisiana. Alexandria Hall was named to honor the people of Alexandria, Louisiana.

The building is part of the campus of Louisiana Christian University, formerly Louisiana College. Alexandria Hall was added to the National Register of Historic Places on May 15, 1986.
