= Chattanooga Car Barns =

Historic building in Chattanooga, Tennessee, US

- U.S. National Register of Historic Places
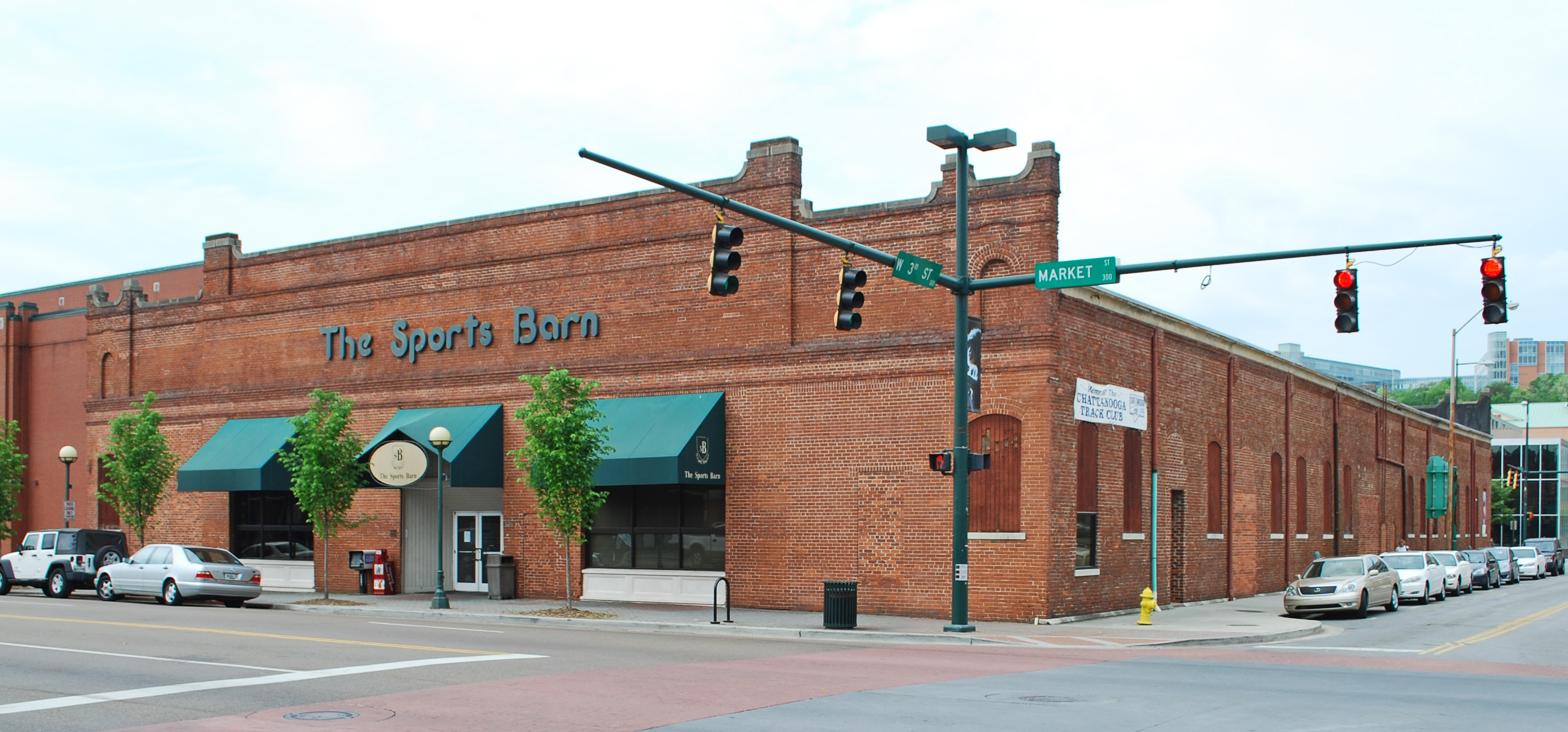

- Location within Tennessee
- Location: 301 Market St., Chattanooga, Tennessee
- Coordinates: 35°03′12″N 85°18′37″W
- Area: 2.3 acres (0.93 ha)
- Built: 1887
- Architect: R.H. Hunt
- NRHP reference No.: 79002436
- Added to NRHP: July 9, 1979

The Chattanooga Car Barns was a three-building complex located at 301 Market St. in Chattanooga, Tennessee. It was built in 1887 and was listed on the National Register of Historic Places in 1979.

The three buildings included "offices facing Third Street, a fifteen-track car barn, and a bus fueling and storage facility. The offices and car barn were designed by R.H. Hunt, Architects." The building was demolished in 2025 to make way for a hotel.
