= First Presbyterian Church (El Dorado, Arkansas) =

Historic church in Arkansas, United States

- U.S. National Register of Historic Places
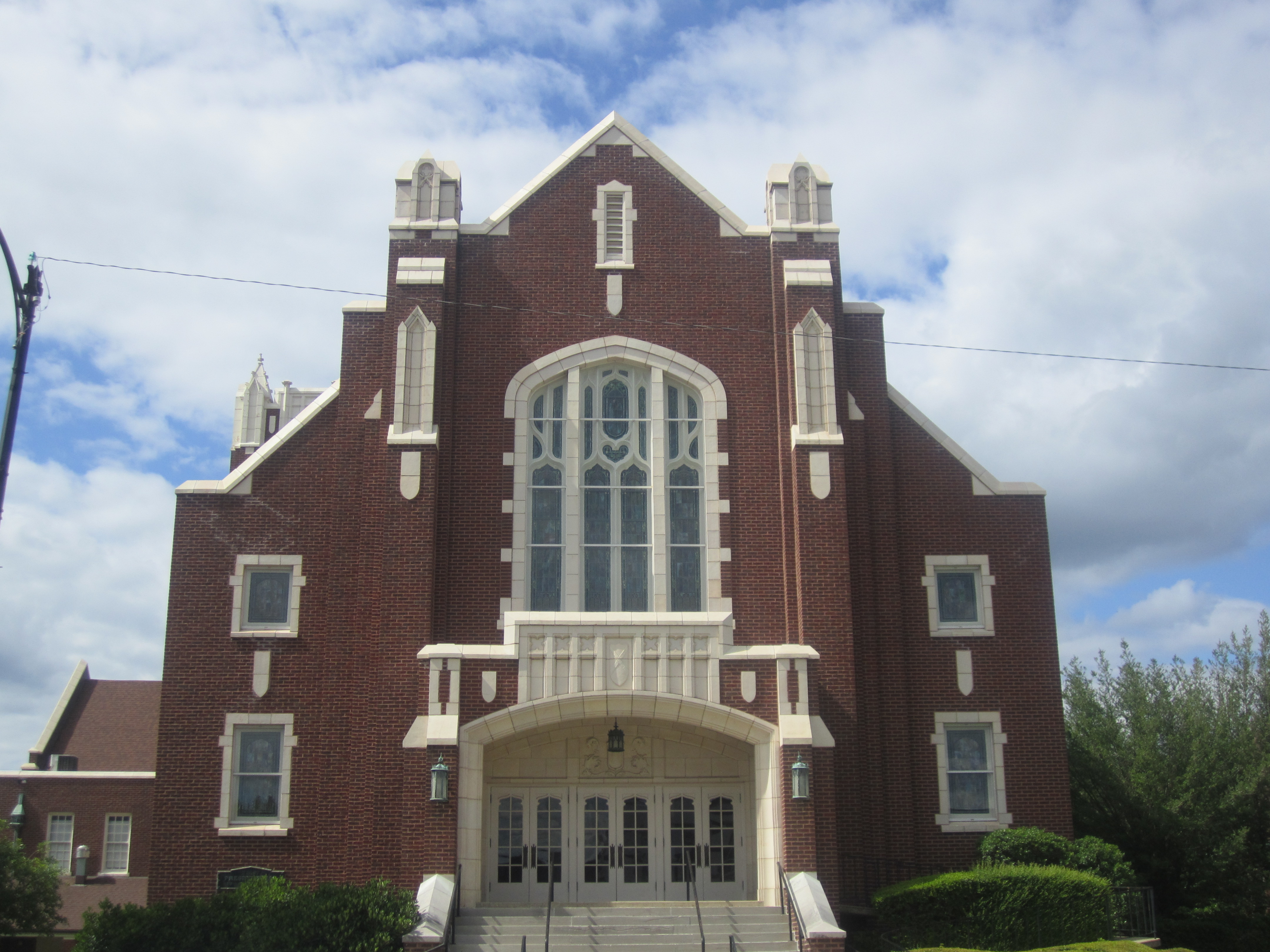

- Location within Arkansas Location within the United States
- Location: 300 E. Main, El Dorado, Arkansas
- Coordinates: 33°12′44″N 92°39′41″W
- Area: 1 acre (0.40 ha)
- Built: 1926
- Architect: R. H. Hunt & Associates
- Architectural style: Late 19th And 20th Century Revivals, Collegiate Gothic
- NRHP reference No.: 91000579
- Added to NRHP: May 14, 1991

The First Presbyterian Church is a historic church at 300 E. Main in El Dorado, Arkansas. The single-story brick building was constructed in 1926 for a congregation which was organized in 1846. The Collegiate Gothic building was built during El Dorado's 1920s boom occasioned by the discovery of oil, and its ensuing rapid growth. It was designed by the architectural firm R. H. Hunt and Associates.

The building was listed on the National Register of Historic Places in 1991.

== See also ==
- National Register of Historic Places listings in Union County, Arkansas
