= McFarlin Memorial Auditorium =

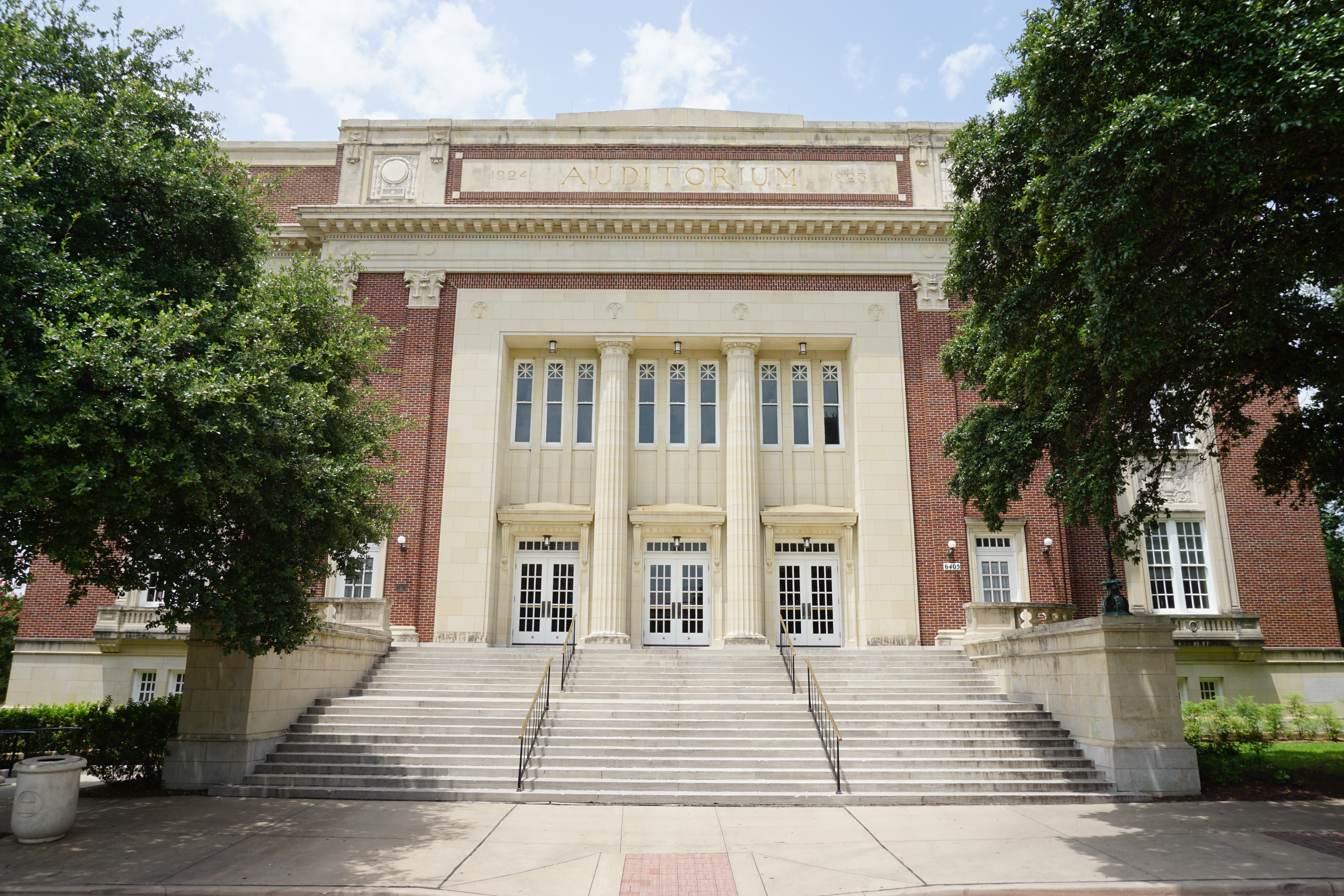
- McFarlin Auditorium in 2016

- Location within Texas Location within the United States
- Address: 6405 Boaz Ln.
- Location: University Park, Texas
- Coordinates: 32°50′39″N 96°47′10″W
- Owner: Southern Methodist University
- Capacity: 2,386
- Acreage: 1 acre (0.40 ha)
- Current use: Auditorium, Theatre

Construction
- Opened: 1926
- Years active: 1926-present
- Architect: R. H. Hunt

Website
- McFarlin Memorial Auditorium
- McFarlin Memorial Auditorium
- U.S. National Register of Historic Places
- Architectural style: Colonial Revival, Georgian Revival
- MPS: Georgian Revival Buildings of Southern Methodist University TR (AD)
- NRHP reference No.: 80004091
- Added to NRHP: September 27, 1980

McFarlin Memorial Auditorium is a proscenium style theatre located on the campus of Southern Methodist University. The venue seats 2,386 on three levels. The building is the third oldest on SMU's campus and has hosted a number of notable acts.

== History ==
By the early 1920s, the students, faculty and staff of SMU had severely outgrown the capacity of Dallas and Clements Halls. Arguments were put forth as to what the next campus building should be. In the end, President Selecman and the Methodist bishops made the decision to build a chapel/auditorium as SMU's third permanent building. Financing was secured by a generous donation from devout Methodist and San Antonio businessman Robert M. McFarlin.

The McFarlin Memorial Auditorium was opened in 1926 to fulfill the University's pressing need for a chapel that could accommodate the entire student body. The building has evolved over time and continues to serve the University in the manner envisioned by SMU President Charles Selecman as "a place where we can have our friends from the community and elsewhere gather together on great occasions."

Though historically attractive, technology and ambiance are priorities as the university continues to keep the facility current. Recent projects include restoration of the main lobby to its historic integrity, renovation of restrooms, installation of a sprung floor on stage, and a complete reupholster of the auditorium's seats.

== Notable events ==
=== Speakers ===
- Winston Churchill
- George Clinton
- Charlton Heston
- Bob Hope
- Kevin O’Leary
- Martin Luther King Jr.
- Margaret Thatcher
- Stephen Hawking
- George H. W. Bush
- George W. Bush
- Ruth Bader Ginsburg

=== Performers ===
- Arlo Guthrie
- Barry Manilow
- Billy Joel
- Billy Thorpe
- Blondie
- Canned Heat
- Conan O'Brien
- Dashboard Confessional
- Death Cab for Cutie
- The Doors
- Ebi
- Elton John
- Evanescence
- George Benson
- The Grateful Dead
- Hall & Oates
- Imogen Heap
- Jackopierce
- James Taylor
- Jane's Addiction
- Jeff Beck
- Jesse Colin Young
- Jimmy Buffett
- The Kinks
- The McElroys
- Outlaws
- Paul Simon
- Pink Floyd
- The Police
- Prince
- Queen
- Randy Newman
- REM
- Shawn Mendes
- Sheryl Crow
- Stephen Sanchez
- Thin Lizzy
- Vanilla Fudge
- Wilco
- Yo-Yo Ma
- XTC

Niel Diamond

== See also ==
- National Register of Historic Places listings in Dallas County, Texas
