= Trinity Methodist Episcopal Church (Chattanooga, Tennessee) =

Historic church in Tennessee, United States

- Formerly listed on the U.S. National Register of Historic Places
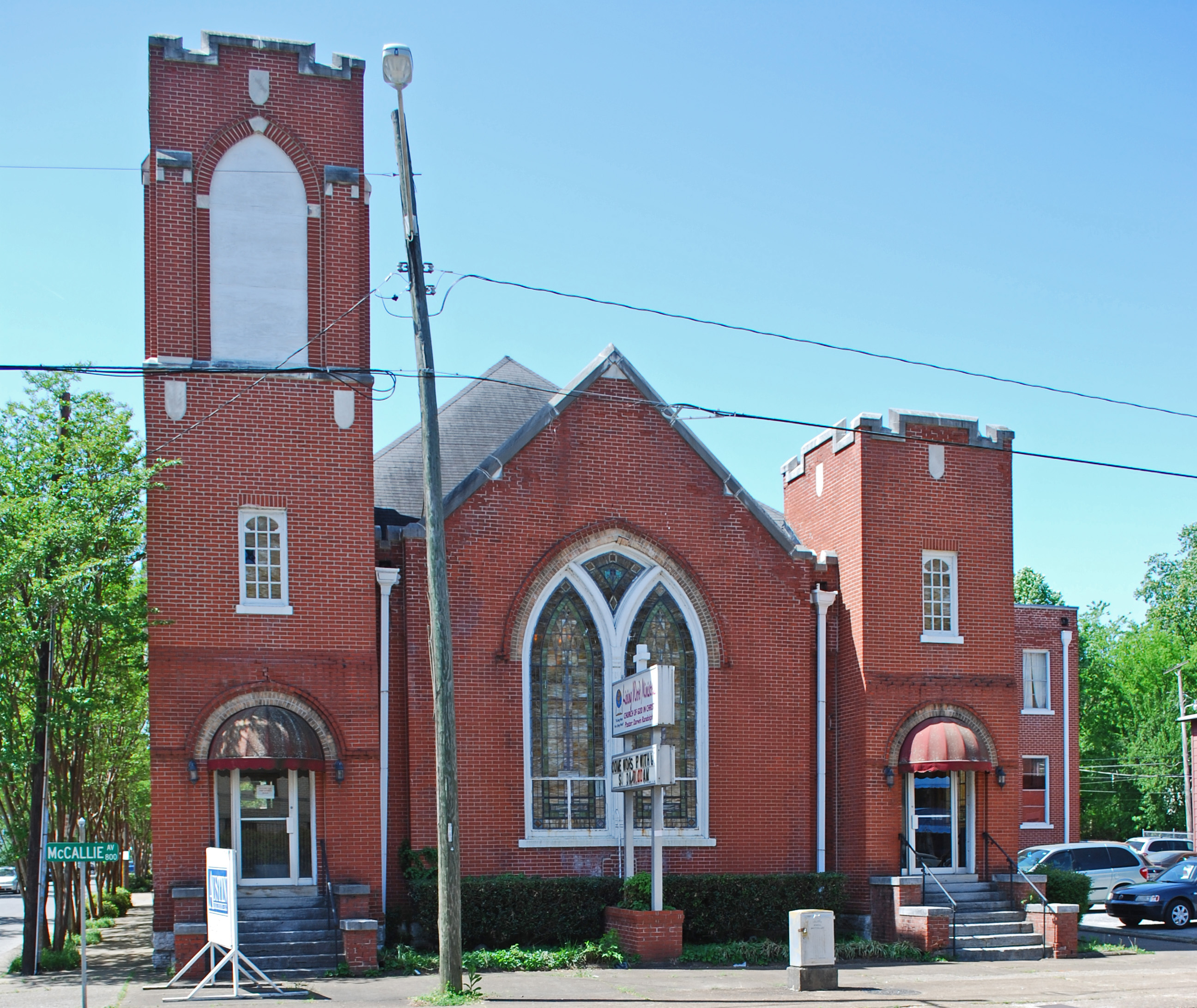

- Location within Tennessee Location within the United States
- Location: McCallie Avenue, Chattanooga, Tennessee
- Coordinates: 35°2′33″N 85°17′37″W
- Area: less than one acre
- Built: 1899
- Architect: Reuben Harrison Hunt
- MPS: Hunt, Reuben H., Buildings in Hamilton County TR
- NRHP reference No.: 80003826

Significant dates
- Added to NRHP: October 28, 1980
- Removed from NRHP: January 14, 2021

Trinity Methodist Episcopal Church (also known as Tucker Baptist Church) was a historic church on McCallie Avenue in Chattanooga, Tennessee.

It was built in 1899. At one time it housed Tucker Missionary Baptist Church. It was added to the National Register of Historic Places in 1980. The building suffered a catastrophic collapse on the morning of May 10, 2011. The building had most recently belonged to The Living Word Ministries but had been disused for some time. No one was injured in the collapse.
