= First Baptist Church (Norfolk, Virginia) =

Historic church in Virginia, United States

- U.S. National Register of Historic Places
- Virginia Landmarks Register
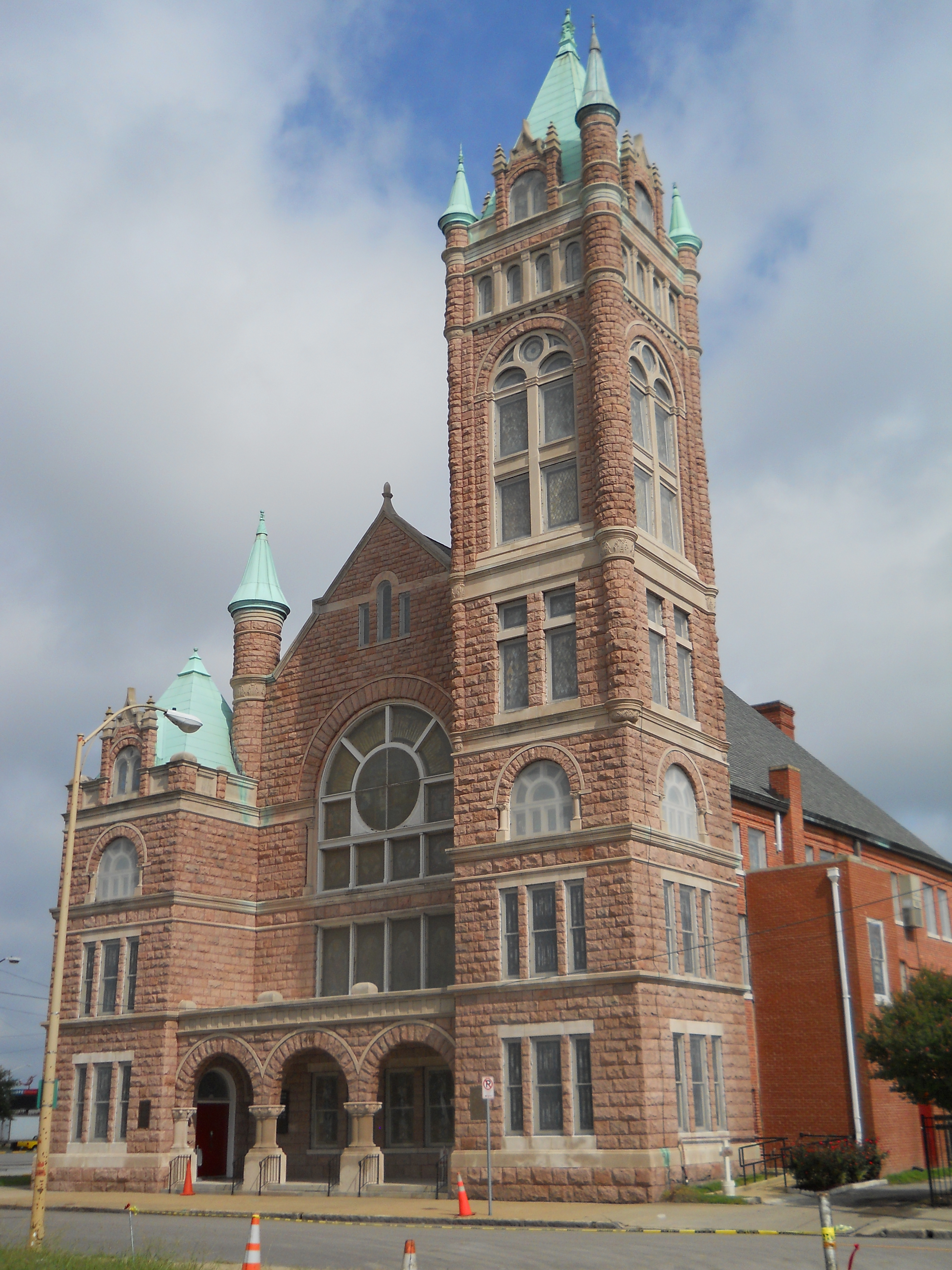
- First Baptist Church, September 2013

- Location within Virginia Location within the United States
- Location: 418 E. Bute St., Norfolk, Virginia
- Coordinates: 36°51′9″N 76°17′4″W
- Area: 0.5 acres (0.20 ha)
- Built: 1906
- Architect: Hunt, Reuben H.
- Architectural style: Romanesque, Romanesque Revival
- NRHP reference No.: 83003297
- VLR No.: 122-0040

Significant dates
- Added to NRHP: July 21, 1983
- Designated VLR: April 19, 1983

First Baptist Church is a historic African-American Baptist church located in Norfolk, Virginia. It was designed by architect R. H. Hunt and dedicated in 1906. It is a Romanesque Revival-style church with a richly ornamented facade of rough-faced, pink granite ashlar and limestone trim. It features a tall, eight-level corner tower with a multiplicity of window types and a shorter flanking tower at the opposite corner. Construction began in 1904.

It was listed on the National Register of Historic Places in 1983.
