= Paris Commercial Historic District (Paris, Tennessee) =

Historic district in Tennessee, United States

- U.S. National Register of Historic Places
- U.S. Historic district
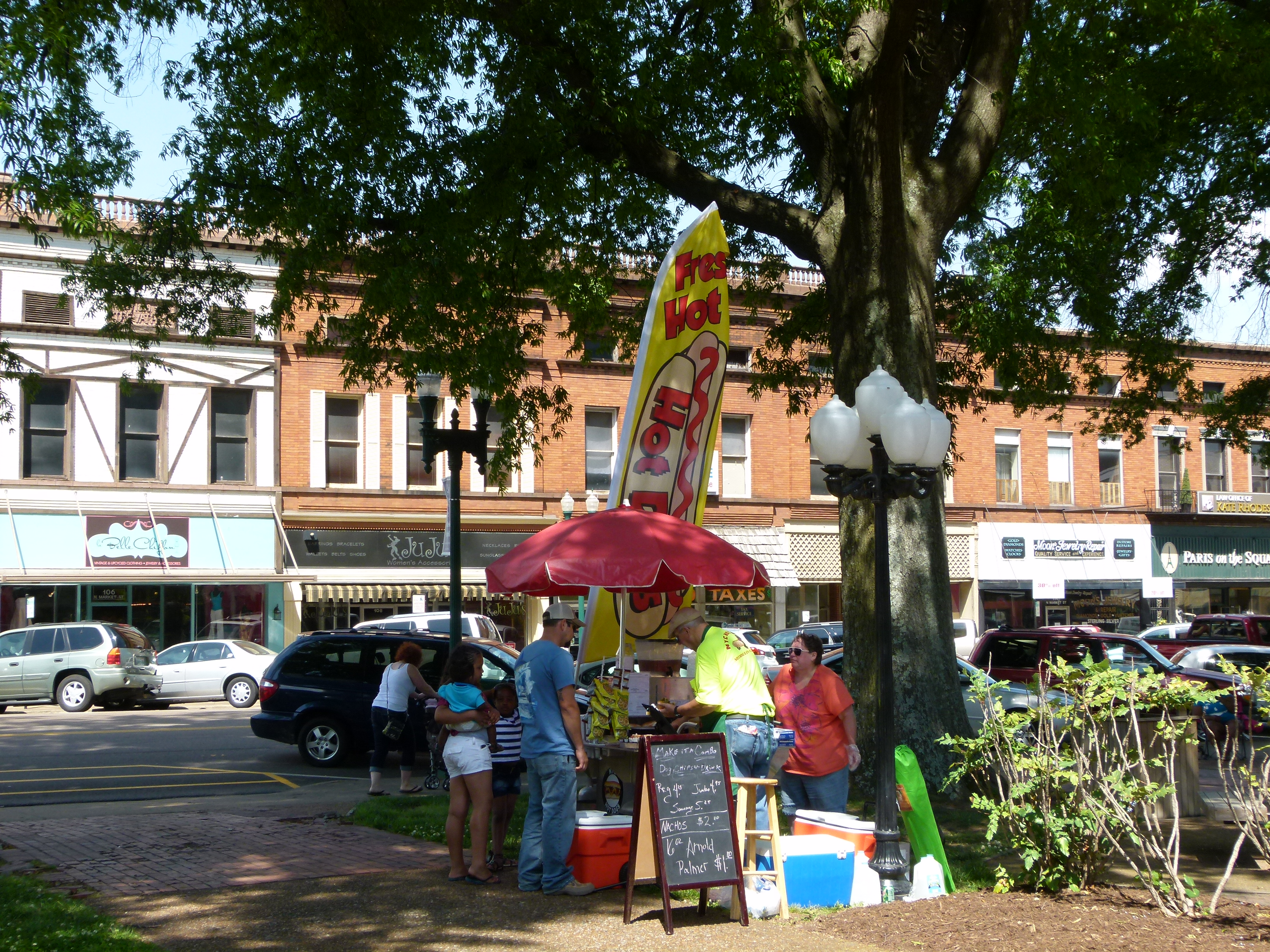

- Location within Tennessee Location within the United States
- Location: Along sections of Wood, Washington, Poplar, Market, Fentress and West Blythe Streets, Paris, Henry County, Tennessee
- Coordinates: 36°18′10″N 88°19′33″W
- Architect: Reuben Harrison Hunt
- Architectural style: Italianate
- NRHP reference No.: 88001424
- Added to NRHP: September 7, 1988

The Paris Commercial Historic District is a historic district in Paris, Henry County, Tennessee.

It was added to the National Register of Historic Places in 1988.
