= R. H. Hunt =

American architect

Reuben Harrison Hunt
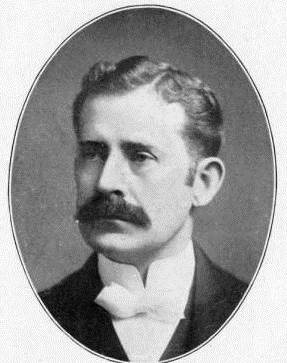
- Born: February 2, 1862; Elbert County, Georgia
- Died: May 28, 1937 (aged 75); Chattanooga, Tennessee
- Occupation: Architect
- Practice: R. H. Hunt Company
- Buildings: Soldiers and Sailors Memorial Auditorium

Reuben Harrison Hunt (February 2, 1862 – May 28, 1937), also known as R. H. Hunt, was an American architect who spent most of his life in Chattanooga, Tennessee. He is considered to have been one of the city's most significant early architects. He also designed major public building projects in other states. He was a principal of the R.H. Hunt and Co. firm.

Hunt moved to Chattanooga in 1882 and was employed as a carpenter by Adams Brothers. By 1886, he had learned to read plans and organize projects for them and was doing the work of an architect. That year he and L. W. McDaniel formed an architectural firm. In 1890, he started a new firm with E. N. Lamm. Two years later, he opened his own firm.

Although he would eventually design and build many different kinds of buildings, Hunt, a devout Baptist, marketed and positioned his firm as primarily a builder of churches of any size. Customers could choose from three books of church building plans, and Hunt routinely reused these making changes mostly to brick, detail work, and the arrangement of buildings on the site. With this system, he was able to build churches throughout the South. This included well-known Chattanooga churches such as Second Presbyterian Church and First Baptist Church, as well as the Tabernacle in Atlanta.

In 1907, Hunt's firm opened a satellite office in Jackson, Mississippi. In 1919, they opened a second satellite office in the Southwestern Life Building in Dallas, Texas. The Dallas office oversaw all projects west of the Mississippi River.

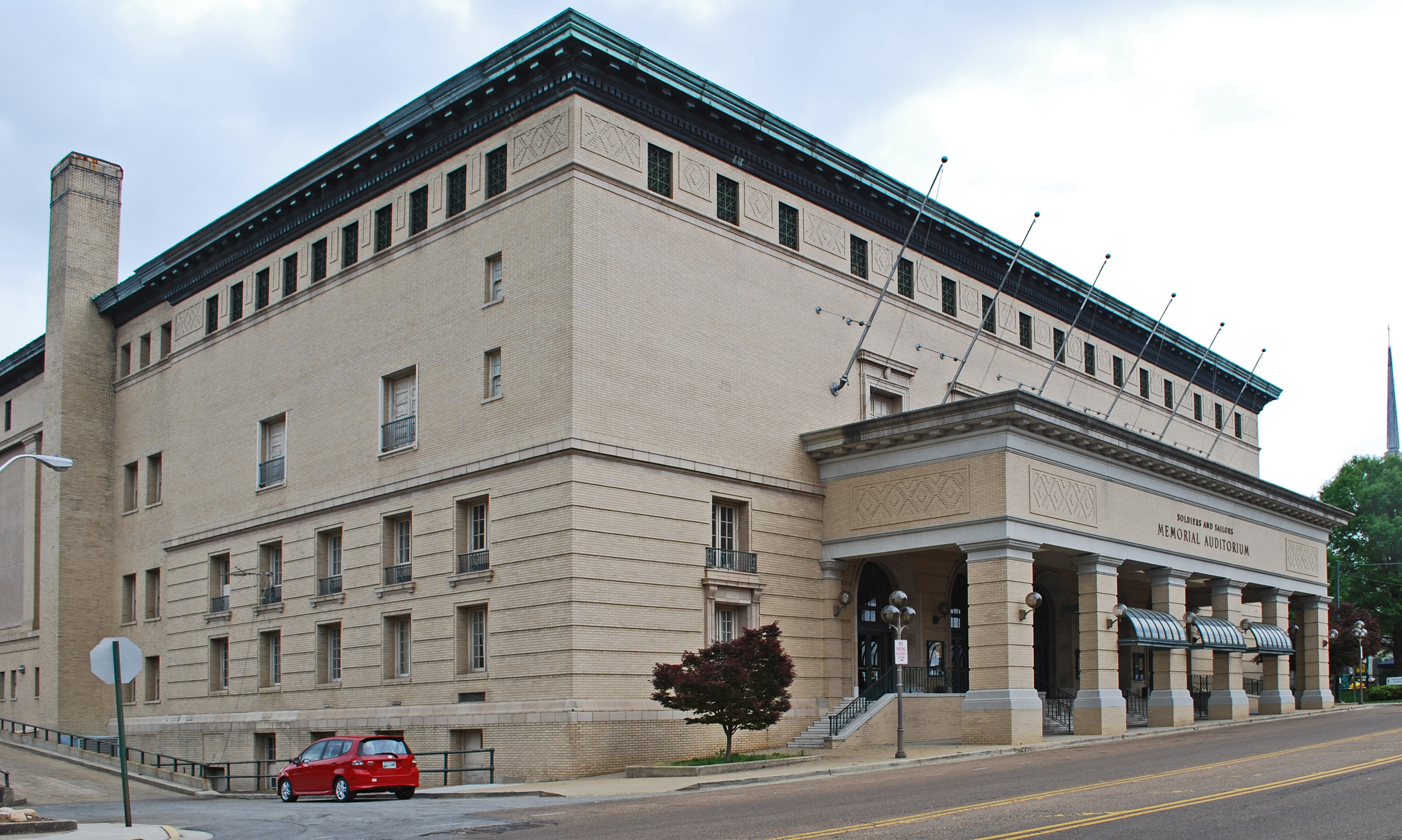
Soldiers and Sailors Memorial Auditorium, Chattanooga, Tennessee (1924)

Hunt designed a number of Chattanooga's homes and public buildings, including the Soldiers and Sailors Memorial Auditorium (1924), the Joel W. Solomon Federal Building and U.S. Courthouse (1934) with Shreve, Lamb and Harmon, the Hamilton County, Tennessee Courthouse (1912), the James (1907) and Maclellan (1924) buildings, the Carnegie Library (1905) and the St. John's Hotel (1915).

The U.S. Post Office and Courthouse in Chattanooga, Tennessee, built 1932–1933, was Hunt's last major work. Hunt designed every major public building constructed in Chattanooga between 1895 and 1935. He was also the architect of local churches, hospitals, and private office buildings, as well as similar public and private buildings throughout the South. In 1938 the Chattanooga building was recognized by the American Institute of Architects as one of the 150 finest buildings constructed in the previous twenty years in the United States, and it was featured in an AIA photographic exhibit in America and Europe. Numerous works by Hunt are preserved and listed on the National Register of Historic Places, 21 of which are covered in one 1979 survey study.

== Gallery ==
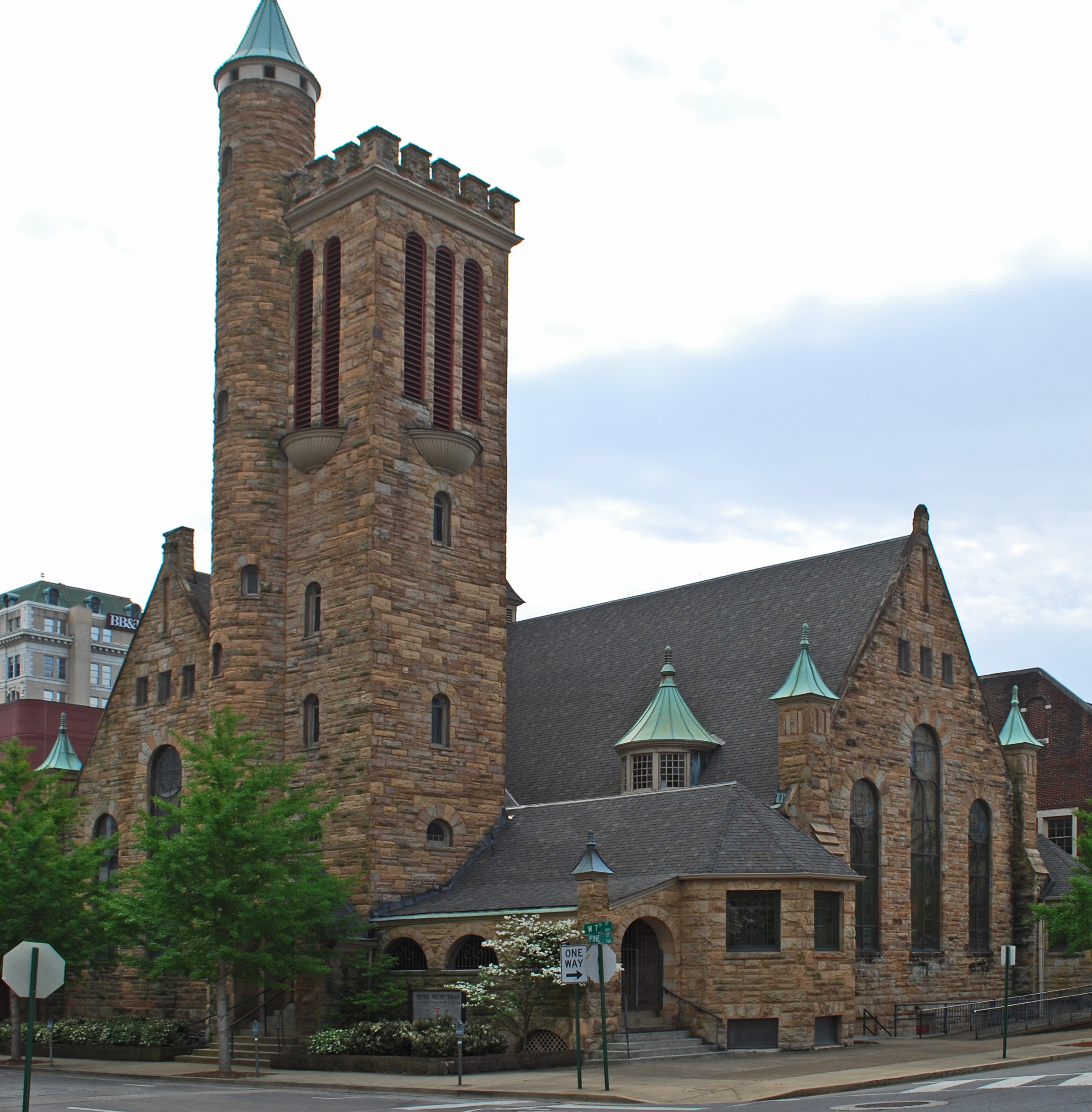
Second Presbyterian Church, Chattanooga, Tennessee (1890)

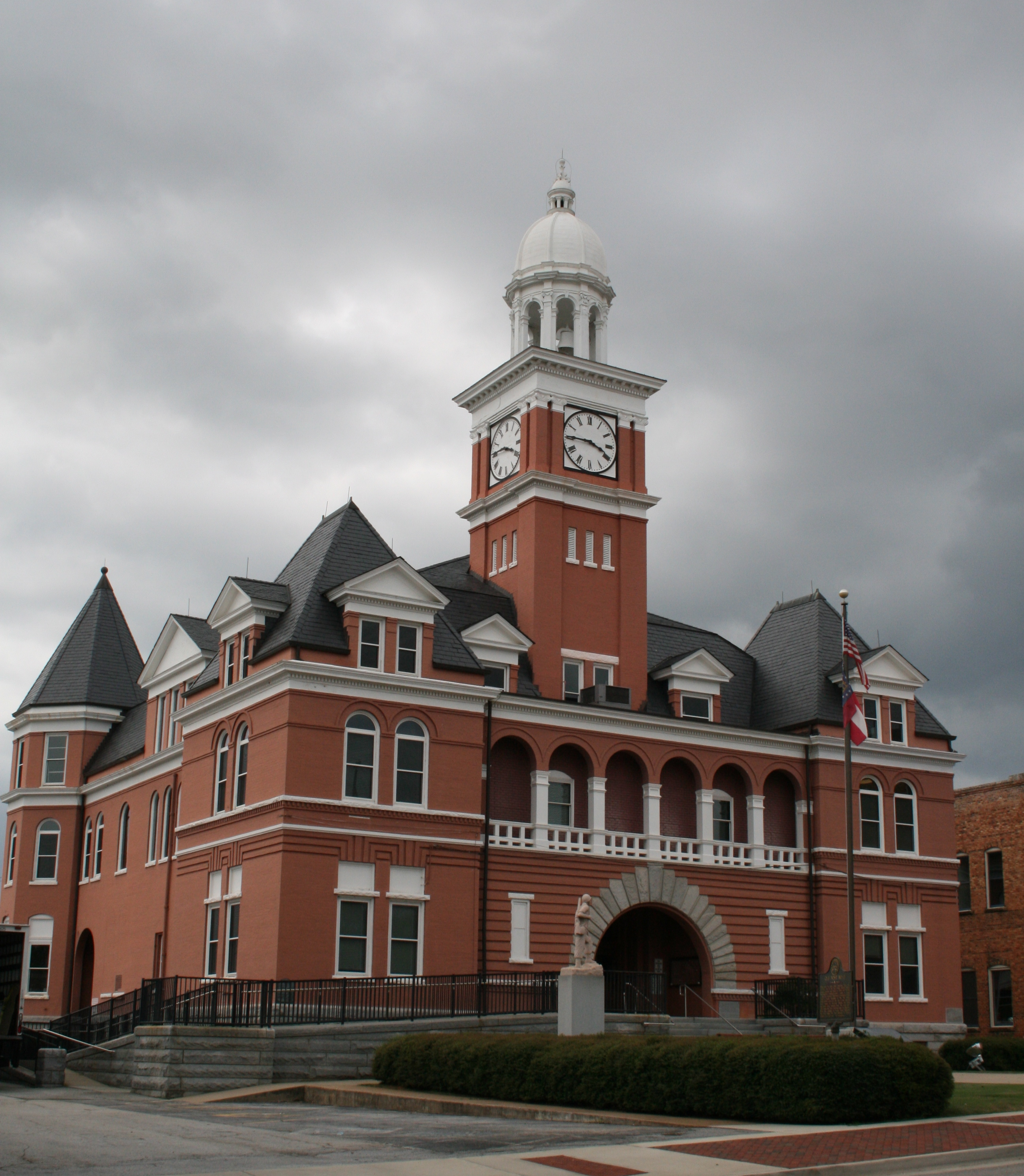
Elbert County Courthouse, Elberton, Georgia (1894)

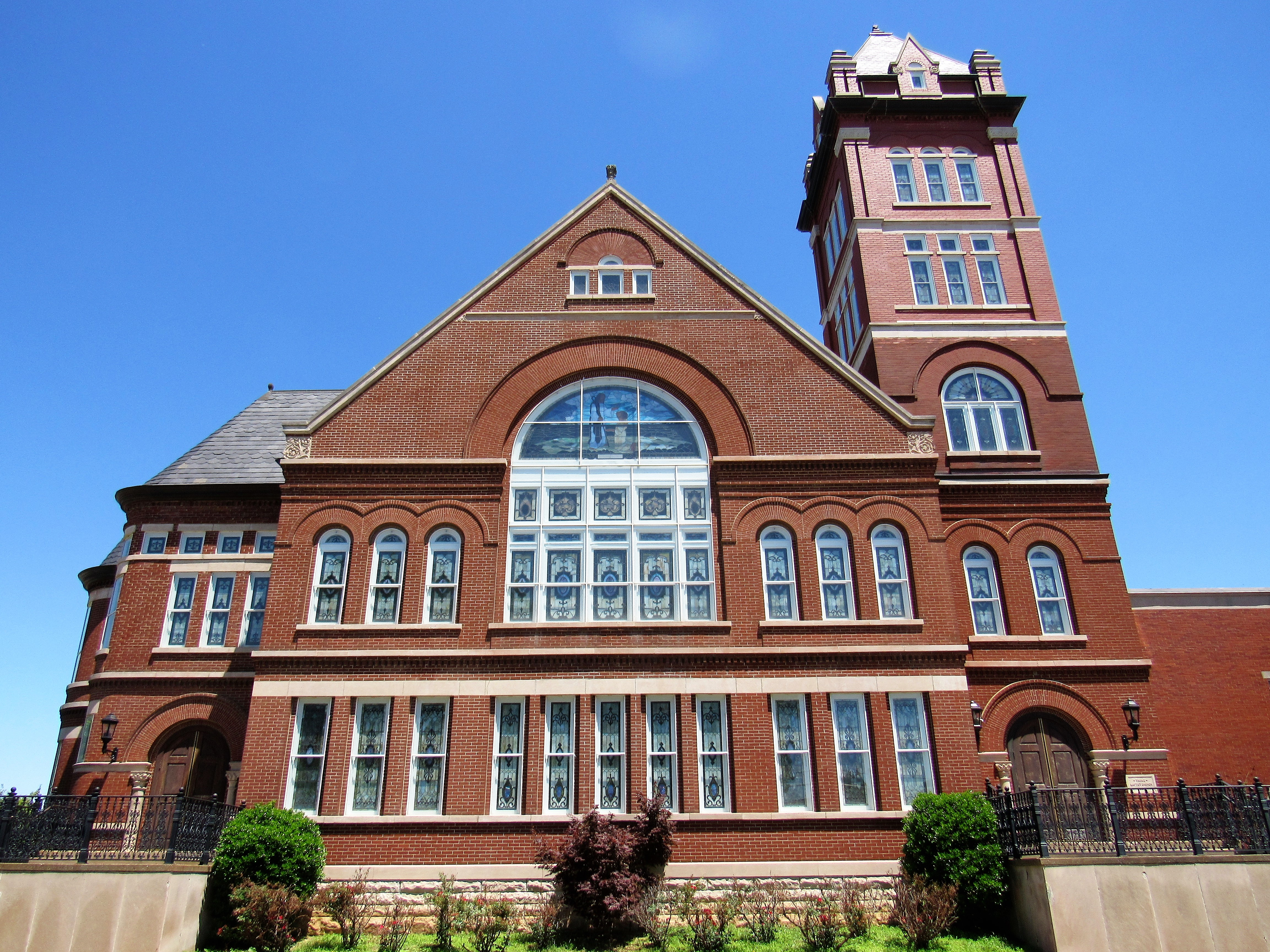
Third Baptist Church, Owensboro, Kentucky (1897)

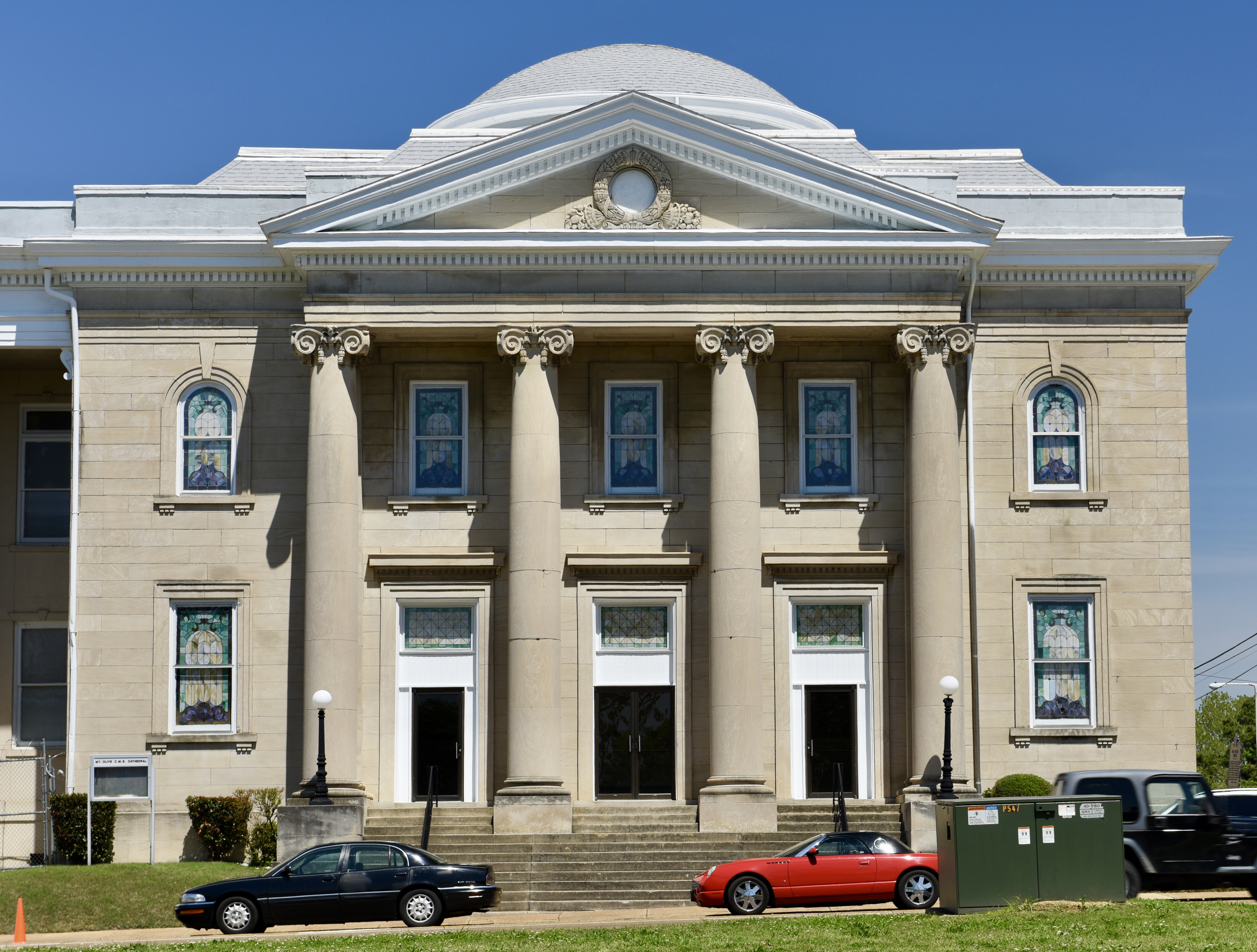
Mount Olive Cathedral, Memphis Tennessee (1907)

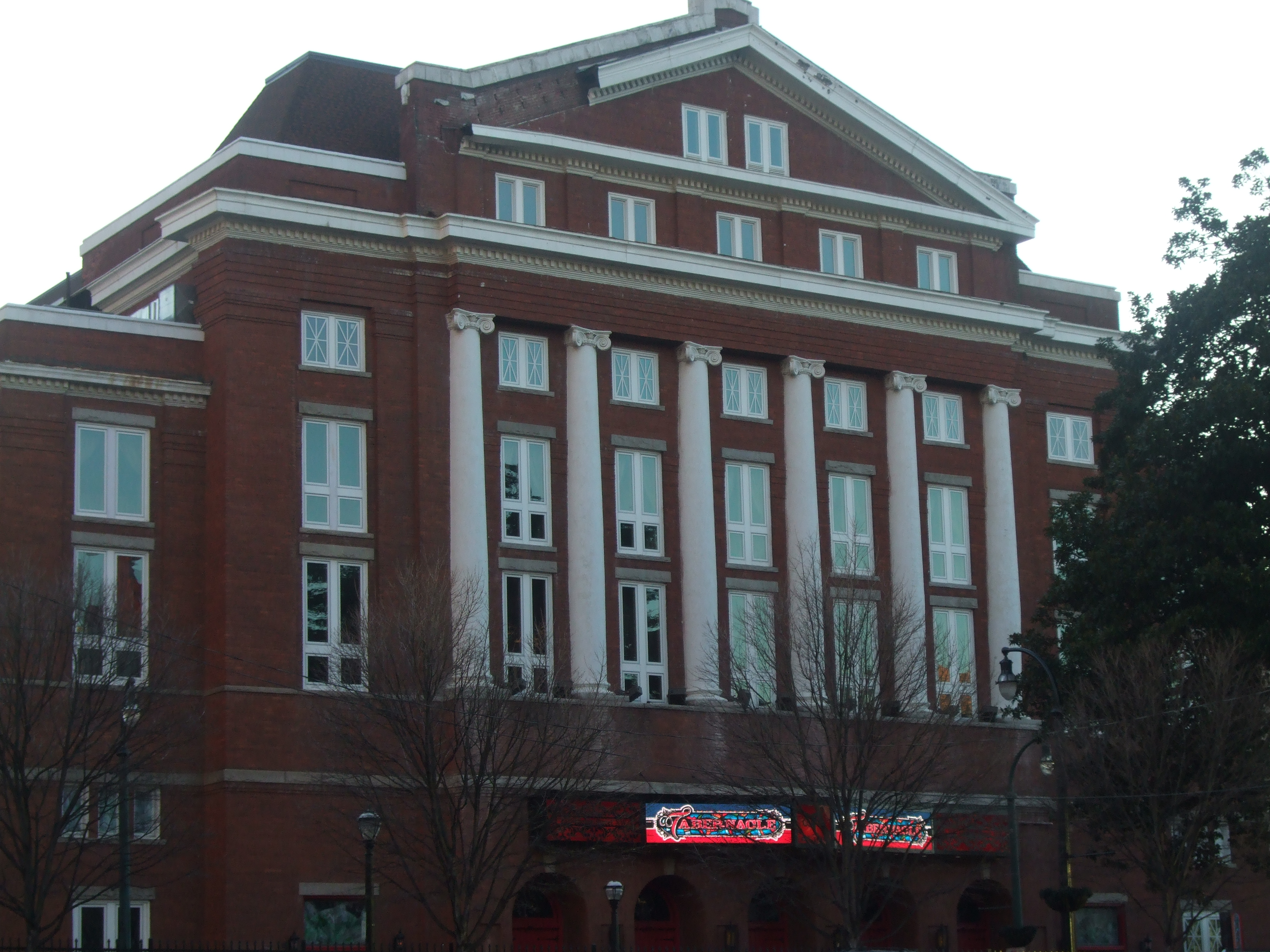
The Tabernacle, Atlanta, Georgia (1911)

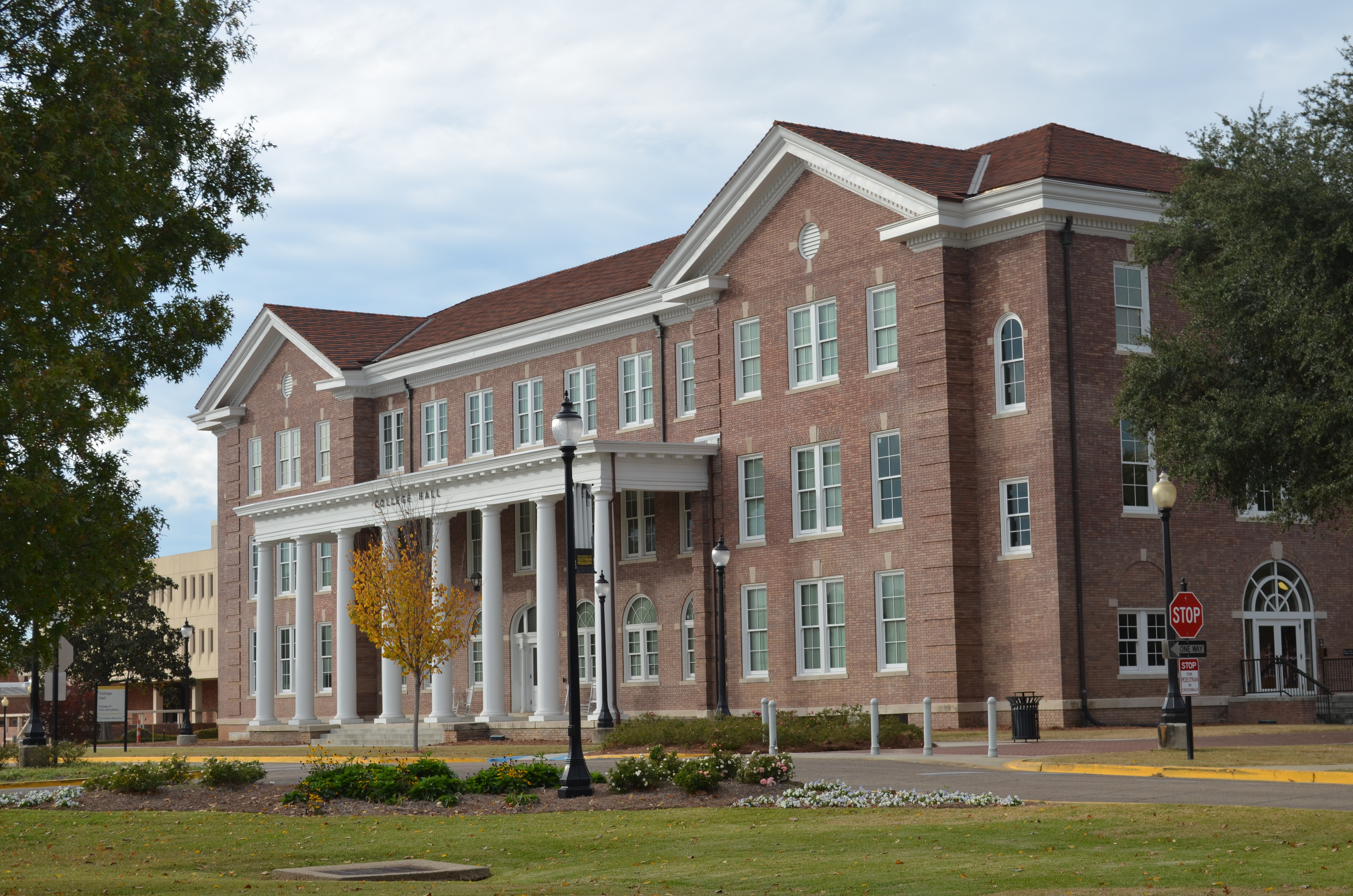
College Hall, University of Southern Mississippi, Hattiesburg, Mississippi (1912)

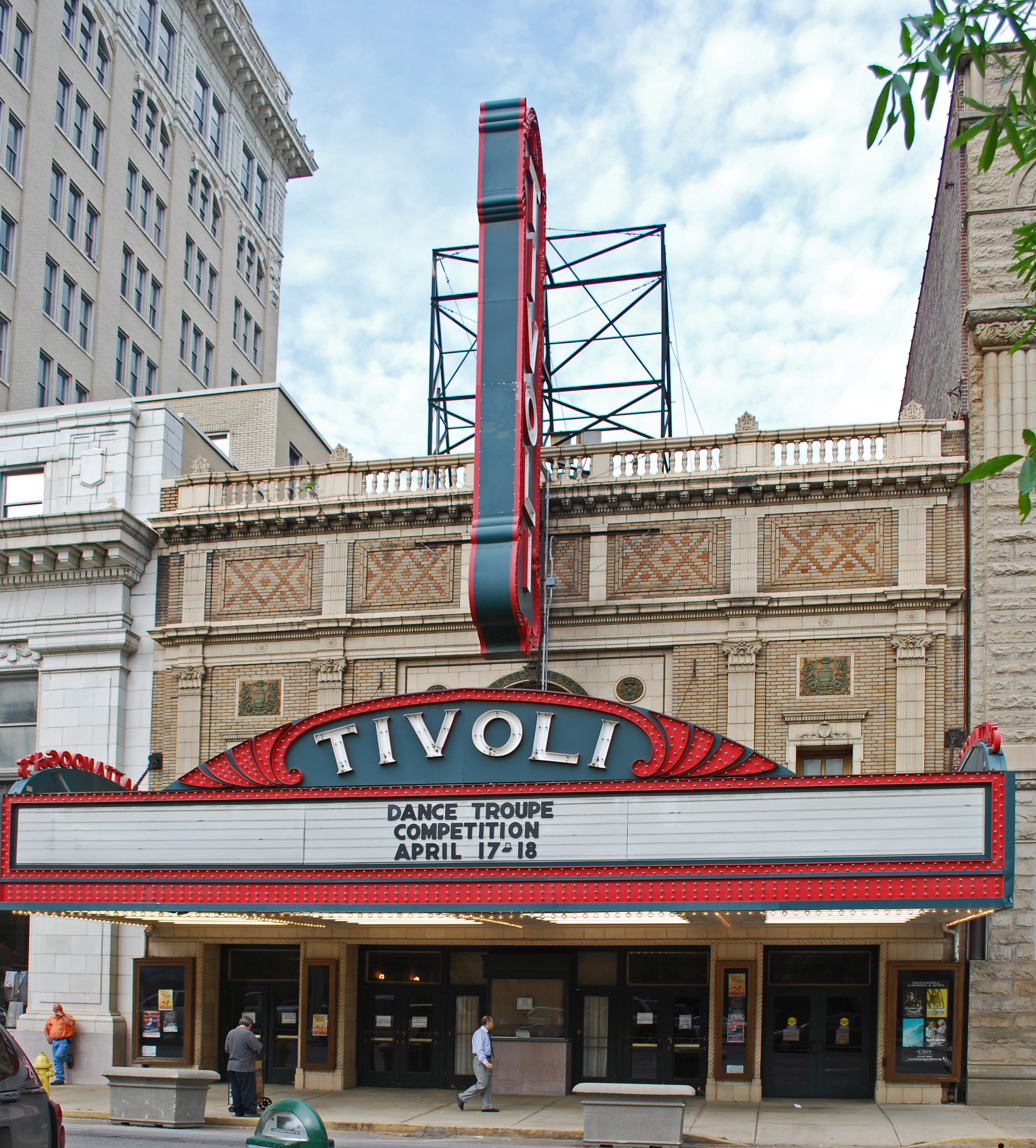
Tivoli Theater, Chattanooga, Tennessee (1921)

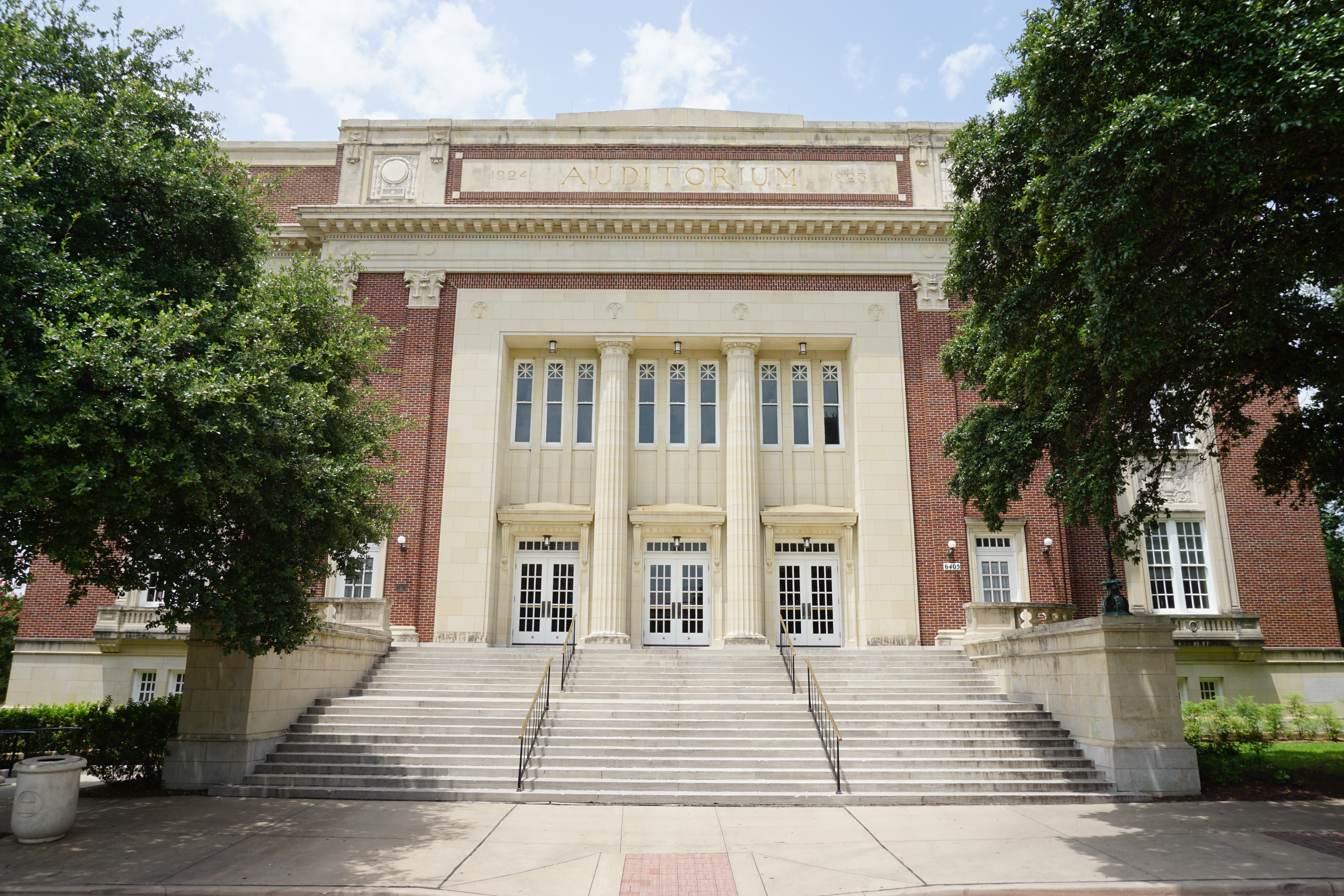
McFarlin Memorial Auditorium, Southern Methodist University, University Park, Texas (1926)

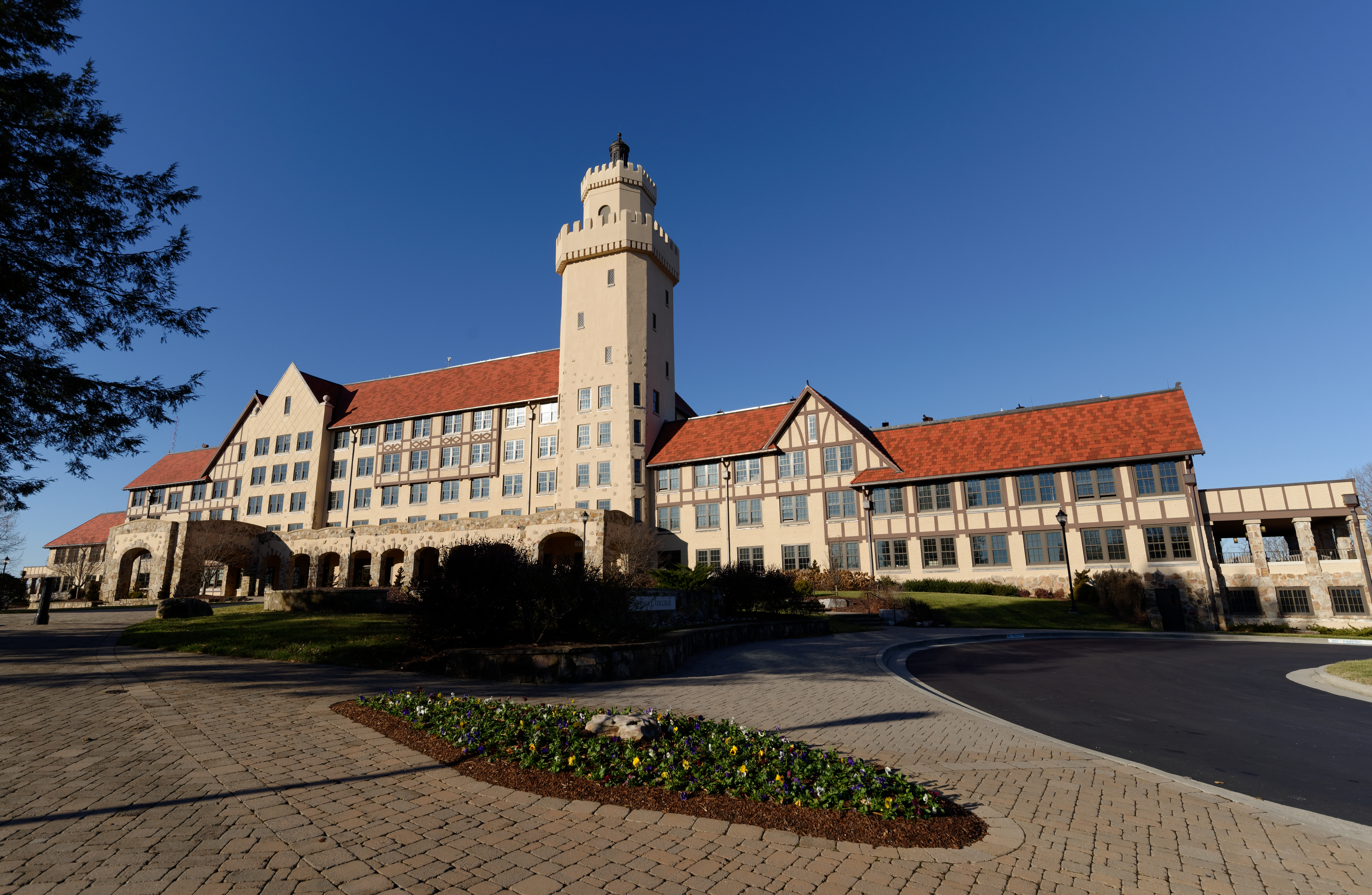
Carter Hall, Covenant College, Dade County, Georgia (1928)

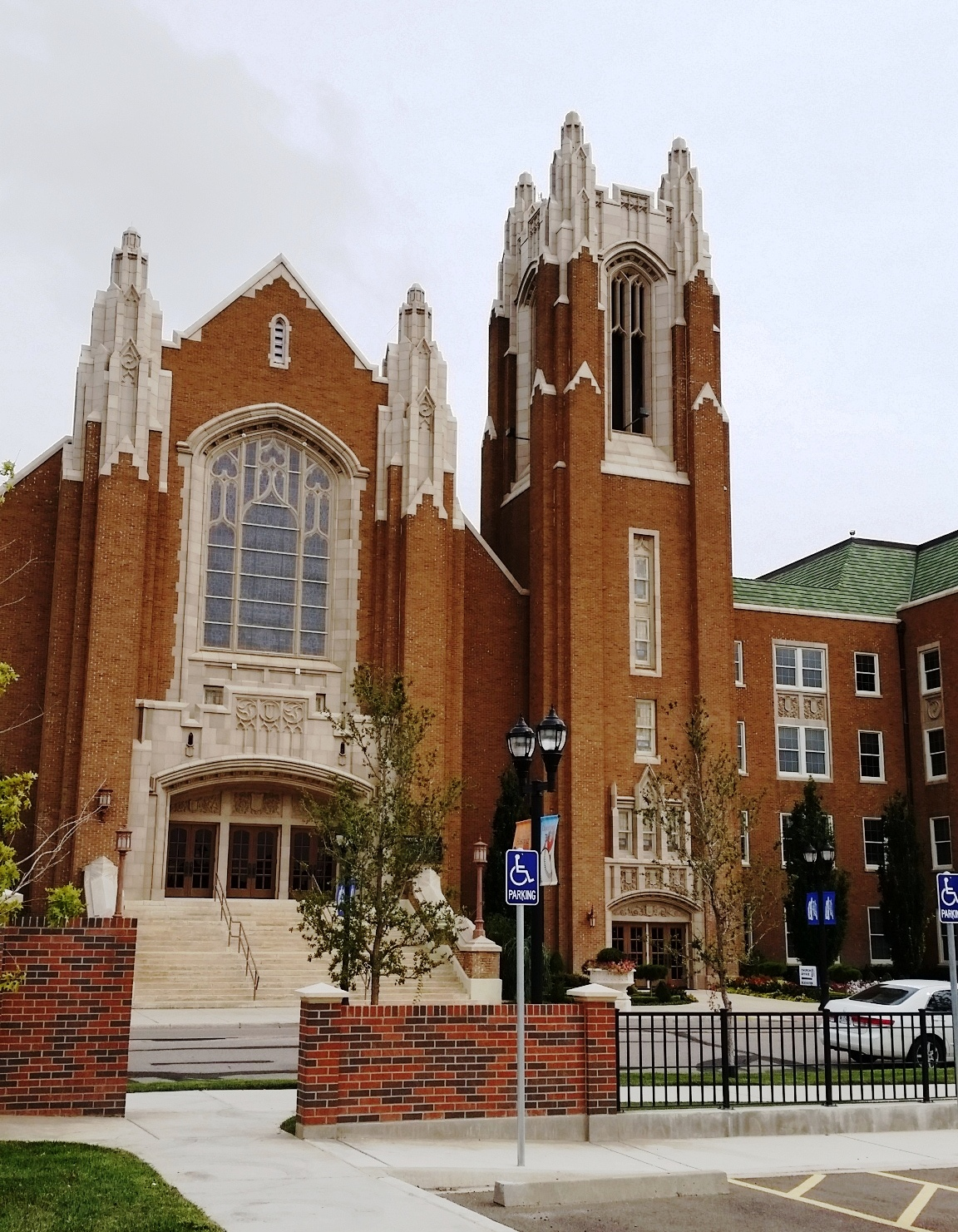
Polk Street Methodist Church, Amarillo, Texas (1928)

== Works ==
This is an incomplete list. Verifiable Hunt buildings not on the table should be added.

Name	Address	City	State	Opened	Citations and Notes
15th Avenue Baptist Church	1318 15th Avenue	Meridian	Mississippi	1922	
Alexandria Hall	Louisiana Christian University	Pineville	Louisiana	1920	NRHP listed
Alumni Hall	Mississippi College	Clinton	Mississippi	1926	
Asbury United Methodist Church	1900 Bailey Avenue	Chattanooga	Tennessee	1909	closed in 1984 NRHP listed
Austin Avenue Methodist Church	1300 Austin Avenue	Waco	Texas	1925	Reopened in 1956 after a major 1954 fire.
Brainerd Junior High School	4201 Cherryton Drive	Chattanooga	Tennessee	1930	NRHP-listed
Calvary Baptist Church	1300 West Capitol Street	Jackson	Mississippi	1929	NRHP-listed
Carpenter Hall, Mississippi State University	210 Carpenter Engineering Building	Mississippi State	Mississippi	1911	
Carter Building	501 North Main Street	Hattiesburg	Mississippi	1907	
Carter Hall, Covenant College	14049 Scenic Highway	Lookout Mountain	Georgia	1928	NRHP-listed in 2019, built for Lookout Mountain Hotel
Central United Methodist Church	201 East Third Avenue	Knoxville	Tennessee	1927	with Baumann, A.B. & Son, NRHP-listed
Central United Methodist Church	1004 23rd Avenue	Meridian	Mississippi	1919	
Central United Methodist Church Downtown Location	27 Church Street	Asheville	North Carolina	1905	
Chattanooga Bank Building	8th Street	Chattanooga	Tennessee	1927	NRHP-listed
Chattanooga Car Barns	301 Market Street	Chattanooga	Tennessee		NRHP-listed
Chattanooga Electric Railway	211-241 Market Street	Chattanooga	Tennessee		NRHP-listed
Chrestman Hall	Mississippi College	Clinton	Mississippi	1926	
College Hall, University of Southern Mississippi	114 Southern Miss Drive	Hattiesburg	Mississippi	1912	
Columbus City Hall	525 Main Street	Columbus	Mississippi	1903	
Columbus Hall, Mississippi University for Women	1206 College Street	Columbus	Mississippi	1896	
Court Street Baptist Church	447 Court Street	Portsmouth	Virginia	1903	
Dominion Outreach Worship Center	119 29th Street	Newport News	Virginia	1903	NRHP-listed, built for First Baptist Church Newport News
Elbert County Courthouse	Courthouse Square	Elberton	Georgia	1894	NRHP-listed
Farr Infirmary	Mississippi College	Clinton	Mississippi	1926	
Fifth Avenue Baptist Church	1135 Fifth Avenue	Huntington	West Virginia	1916	
First Baptist Church	980 Broadway Street	Beaumont	Texas		closed
First Baptist Church	2201 6th Avenue North	Birmingham	Alabama		destroyed
First Baptist Church	125 East Fulton Street	Canton	Mississippi	1918	
First Baptist Church	100 East College Street	Clinton	Mississippi	1923	
First Baptist Church	414 Cleveland Street	Durham	North Carolina	1927	
First Baptist Church	151 Caldwell Drive	Hazlehurst	Mississippi	1926	
First Baptist Church	607 West 5th Street	Laurel	Mississippi	1920	demolished 1960
First Baptist Church	111 South 7th Street	Muskogee	Oklahoma		
First Baptist Church	418 East Bute Street	Norfolk	Virginia	1906	NRHP-listed
First Baptist Church Education Building	317 Oak Street	Chattanooga	Tennessee	1928	NRHP-listed
First Presbyterian Church	300 East Main Street	El Dorado	Arkansas	1926	NRHP-listed
First Presbyterian Church	AR 79B	Fordyce	Arkansas	1912	NRHP-listed
First Presbyterian Church	1501 Cherry Street	Vicksburg	Mississippi	1908	
First United Methodist Church	1928 Ross Avenue	Dallas	Texas	1926	with Herbert M. Greene
First United Methodist Church	201 South Locust Street	Denton	Texas		
First United Methodist Church	200 North 15th Street	Fort Smith	Arkansas		
First United Methodist Church	310 West Washington Street	Greenwood	Mississippi	1898	NRHP-listed
First United Methodist Church	309 Church Street NW	Lenoir	North Carolina		
First United Methodist Church	1817 Arlington Avenue	Bessemer	Alabama	1914	Burned 1928 and rebuilt. Closed 2010.
First United Methodist Church	68 South Main Street	Pontotoc	Mississippi	1910	
First United Methodist Church	417 Elm Street	Ranger	Texas		closed in 2018
Forrest County Hall	University of Southern Mississippi	Hattiesburg	Mississippi	1912	
Fountain Square	600–622 Georgia Avenue and 317 Oak Street	Chattanooga	Tennessee		NRHP-listed
Frances Willard House	615 Lindsay Street	Chattanooga	Tennessee		NRHP-listed
Franklin Hall, Mississippi University for Women	1400 College Street	Columbus	Mississippi	1900	
Galloway United Methodist Church	305 North Congress Street	Jackson	Mississippi	1915	
Grove, E. W. Henry County High School	Grove Blvd	Paris	Tennessee		NRHP-listed
Hamilton County Courthouse	West 6th Street and Georgia Avenue	Chattanooga	Tennessee	1912	NRHP-listed
Hamilton National Bank	701 North Market Street	Chattanooga	Tennessee		
Hasting-Simmons Hall, Mississippi University for Women	1210 College Street	Columbus	Mississippi	1900	
Hattiesburg Hall, University of Southern Mississippi	108 East Memorial Drive	Hattiesburg	Mississippi	1912	
Henderson Hall, Tennessee Technological University	Dixie Avenue	Cookeville	Tennessee		
Henry County Courthouse	Court Square	Paris	Tennessee	1896	
Honor House, University of Southern Mississippi	118 College Drive #5162	Hattiesburg	Mississippi	1912	
Houston Carnegie Library	105 West Madison Street	Houston	Mississippi	1909	
James Building	735 Broad Street	Chattanooga	Tennessee		NRHP-listed
Joel W. Solomon Federal Building and U.S. Courthouse		Chattanooga	Tennessee	1934	with Shreve, Lamb and Harmon
Kimsey Junior College	244 TN 68	Ducktown	Tennessee	1933	Vacant since 2007. NRHP-listed
Lander College Old Main Building	Stanley Avenue and Lander Street	Greenwood	South Carolina	1904	NRHP-listed
Lawrence County Courthouse	North side Broad Street between Jefferson and Washington Streets	Monticello	Mississippi	1913	NRHP-listed
Leflore County Courthouse	310 West Market Street	Greenwood	Mississippi	1906	
Lenoir Presbyterian Church	1002 Kirkwood Street	Lenoir	North Carolina	1903	
Lowrey Hall	Mississippi College	Clinton	Mississippi	1917	
Maclellan Building	721 Broad Street	Chattanooga	Tennessee		NRHP-listed
Main Street United Methodist Church	712 Main Street	Hattiesburg	Mississippi	1910	
McFarlin Memorial Auditorium, Southern Methodist University	6405 Boaz Lane, Suite G38	University Park	Texas	1926	NRHP-listed
Medical Arts Building	McCallie Avenue	Chattanooga	Tennessee		NRHP-listed
Miller Brothers Department Store	629 Market Street	Chattanooga	Tennessee		NRHP-listed
Missionary Ridge Historic District	N. and S. Crest Road from Delong Reservation to 700 S. Crest Road	Chattanooga	Tennessee		NRHP-listed
Mississippi Hall	University of Southern Mississippi	Hattiesburg	Mississippi	1914	
Montgomery Hall	Mississippi State University	Starkville	Mississippi	1914	NRHP-listed
Mount Olive Cathedral C.M.E. Church	538 Dr. M.L. King Jr. Avenue	Memphis	Tennessee	1907	NRHP-listed, built for First Baptist Church
Municipal Building	East 11th Street	Chattanooga	Tennessee		NRHP-listed
Nathan L. Bachman School	281 Anderson Pike	Walden	Tennessee	1937	NRHP-listed
North Alexander School	313B North Alexander Avenue	Washington	Georgia		
Northside Presbyterian Church	923 Mississippi Avenue	Chattanooga	Tennessee	1916	NRHP-listed, the one known Greek Revival work by Hunt in Hamilton County
Ogletree Alumni House, University of Southern Mississippi	102 Alumni Drive	Hattiesburg	Mississippi	1912	
Old Library Building	200 East 8th Street	Chattanooga	Tennessee	1904	NRHP-listed
Paris Commercial Historic District	Along sections of E. and W. Wood, W. Washington, N. and S. Poplar, N. and S. Market, Fentress and W. Blythe Sts	Paris	Tennessee		NRHP-listed
Polk County Courthouse	Bounded by US 411 and Ward, Commerce and Main Streets	Benton	Tennessee	1937	NRHP-listed
Polk Street Methodist Church	1401 South Polk Street	Amarillo	Texas	1928	
Ratliff Hall	Mississippi College	Clinton	Mississippi	1914	
Red Bank United Methodist Church	3800 Dayton Blvd.	Chattanooga	Tennessee		
Second Presbyterian Church	700 Pine Street	Chattanooga	Tennessee	1890	NRHP-listed
Shattuck Hall, Mississippi University for Women	302 15th Street South	Columbus	Mississippi	1911	
Soldiers and Sailors Memorial Auditorium	McCallie Avenue	Chattanooga	Tennessee	1924	NRHP-listed
Soul's Harbor Deliverance Center	1921 Avenue G	Birmingham	Alabama	1910	built for First United Methodist Church of Ensley
South Main Street Historic District	200–422 S. Main Street	Pikeville	Tennessee		NRHP-listed
Southern Hall, University of Southern Mississippi	Southern Miss Drive	Hattiesburg	Mississippi	1922	
Southside Baptist Church	1016 19th Street South	Birmingham	Alabama	1911	
Temple B'nai Sholom	103 Lincoln Street SE	Huntsville	Alabama	1899	NRHP-listed
Third Baptist Church	527 Allen Street	Owensboro	Kentucky	1897	
Tivoli Theater	709 Broad Street	Chattanooga	Tennessee	1921	NRHP-listed
Trigg County Courthouse		Cadiz	Kentucky		NRHP-listed
Trinity Methodist Episcopal Church	McCallie Avenue	Chattanooga	Tennessee	1899	NRHP-listed collapsed 2011
Union Presbyterian Church	700 Fisk Avenue	Brownwood	Texas		
University Baptist Church	102 South Columbia Street	Chapel Hill	North Carolina		
Winona Commercial Historic District	Roughly bounded by Magnolia Street, Central Avenue, Carrollton Street and Sterling Avenue	Winona	Mississippi		NRHP-listed
Wisteria Hotel	Central Avenue	Winona	Mississippi	1910	NRHP-listed
Wyatt Hall	865 East Third Street	Chattanooga	Tennessee	1921	NRHP-listed
