= Elbert County Courthouse =

- U.S. National Register of Historic Places
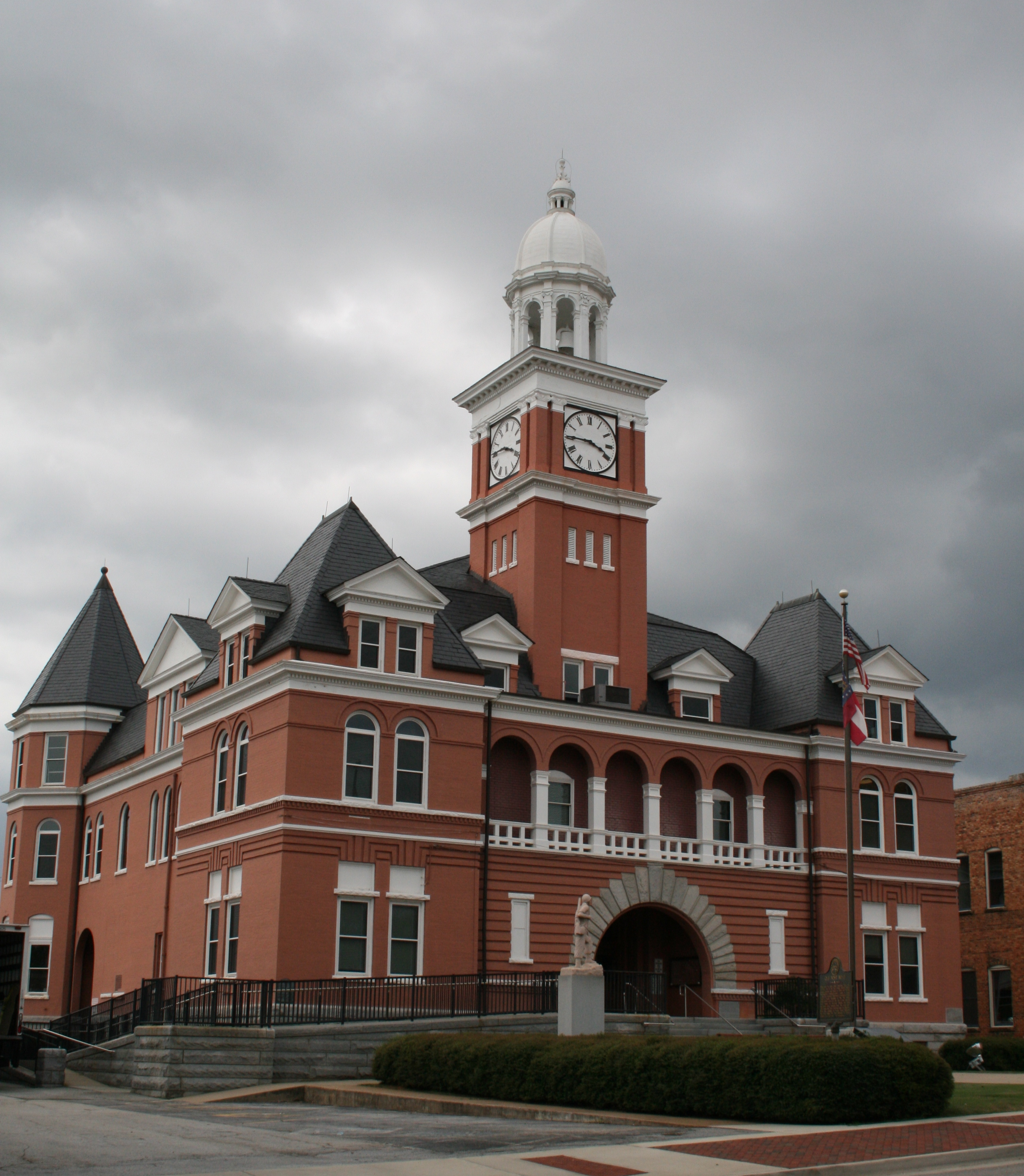
- Elbert County Courthouse photographed in 2012

- Location within Georgia Location within the United States
- Location: Courthouse Sq., Elberton, Georgia
- Coordinates: 34.109917°N 82.868590°W
- Area: 2 acres (0.81 ha)
- Built: 1893
- Architect: R.H. Hunt
- Architectural style: Romanesque
- MPS: Georgia County Courthouses TR
- NRHP reference No.: 80001017
- Added to NRHP: September 18, 1980

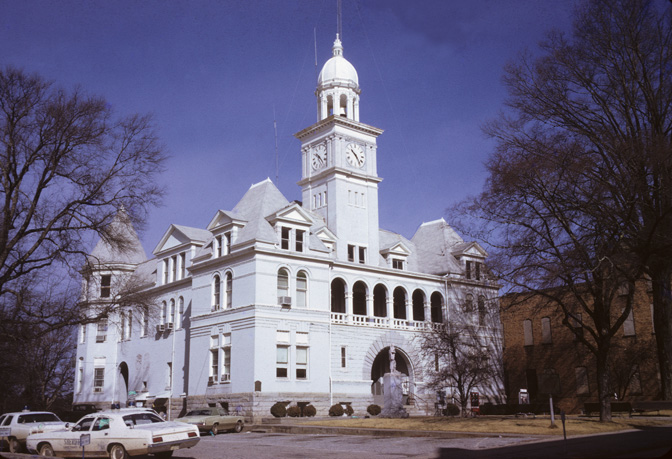
Elbert County Courthouse in a 1973 photograph by Calvin Beale (the courthouse appears to have been painted white)

Elbert County Courthouse is a historic courthouse on Courthouse Square in downtown Elberton, Georgia, county seat of Elbert County, Georgia. The Romanesque Revival architecture building was designed by Reuben H. Hunt and constructed in 1894. It is featured on several postcards. It was listed on the National Register of Historic Places on September 18, 1980.

The brick exterior of the courthouse was painted white for several decades until the early 2000s when the exterior brick was repainted red to recreate the original appearance of red bricks.

== See also ==
- National Register of Historic Places listings in Elbert County, Georgia
