= List of warehouse districts =

This is a list of notable warehouse districts.

A warehouse district or warehouse row is an area found in many urban settings known for being the current or former location of numerous warehouses. Logistically, warehouses are often located in industrial parks, with access to bulk transportation outlets such as highways, railroads, and airports. The areas where warehouses are typically built are often designated as special zones for urban planning purposes, and "can have their own substantial infrastructures, comprising roads, utilities, and energy systems". In many instances, where changing social and economic conditions have made it unfeasible to maintain an existing warehouse district, cities or communities will invest in converting the district to other purposes for which this infrastructure can still be used, such as an art district. Such a converted area may continue to be known as a warehouse district.

Notable areas known as warehouse districts include:

== Canada ==
- Distillery District is located in Toronto, Ontario and is the largest collection of Victorian-era industrial architecture in North America.
- Warehouse District, Edmonton

== Germany ==
- Speicherstadt in Hamburg, Germany

== Poland ==
- Karolin in Warsaw, Poland
- Służewiec in Warsaw, Poland
  - Służewiec Przemysłowy
- Wyczółki in Warsaw, Poland

== United Kingdom ==
- Harringay Warehouse District

== United States (by state then city) ==
=== Arizona ===
- Tucson Warehouse Historic District, Tucson, listed on the NRHP in Pima County

=== Arkansas ===
- Hot Springs Railroad Warehouse Historic District, Hot Springs, listed on the NRHP in Garland County

=== California ===
- Warehouse Row Fresno, listed on the NRHP in Fresno County
- Warehouse District, Los Angeles
- Oakland Waterfront Warehouse District, Oakland, listed on the NRHP in Alameda County

=== Georgia ===
- Athens Warehouse Historic District, Athens, listed on the NRHP in Clarke County
- East Vine Street Warehouse and Depot District, Statesboro, listed on the NRHP in Bulloch County

=== Idaho ===
- Pocatello Warehouse Historic District, Pocatello, listed on the NRHP in Bannock County
- Twin Falls Warehouse Historic District, Twin Falls, listed on the NRHP in Twin Falls County

=== Illinois ===
- Fulton River District, Chicago
- Warehouse Historic District, Peoria, listed on the NRHP in Peoria County, Illinois

=== Iowa ===
- Crescent Warehouse Historic District, Davenport, listed on the NRHP in Scott County

=== Kansas ===
- Wichita Historic Warehouse and Jobbers District, Wichita, listed on the NRHP in Sedgwick County

=== Kentucky ===
- Warehouse District, Danville, listed on the National Register of Historic Places in Boyle County
- Hopkinsville Warehouse Historic District, Hopkinsville, listed on the NRHP in Christian County

=== Louisiana ===
- New Orleans Central Business District, New Orleans

=== Michigan ===
- River Place, Detroit, listed on the NRHP in Wayne County

=== Minnesota ===
- Minneapolis Warehouse Historic District, Minneapolis, Minnesota, listed on the NRHP in Hennepin County
- North Loop, Minneapolis, which includes the Minneapolis Warehouse Historic District

=== Missouri ===
- Warehouse Row Historic District, Cape Girardeau, listed on the NRHP in Cape Girardeau County
- Walnut Street Warehouse and Commercial Historic District, Kansas City, listed on the NRHP in Jackson County
- Cupples Warehouse District, St. Louis, listed on the NRHP in St. Louis, Missouri
- Washington Avenue Loft District, St. Louis
- Springfield Warehouse and Industrial Historic District, Springfield, listed on the NRHP in Greene County

=== New Jersey ===
- Powerhouse Arts District, Jersey City

=== New York ===
- Meatpacking District, New York
- Larkin District, Buffalo

=== North Carolina ===
- Greenville Tobacco Warehouse Historic District, Greenville, listed on the NRHP in Pitt County
- Wilson Central Business-Tobacco Warehouse Historic District, Wilson, listed on the NRHP in Wilson County
- Warehouse District, Raleigh

=== Ohio ===
- Cincinnati East Manufacturing and Warehouse District, Cincinnati, listed on the NRHP
- Cleveland Warehouse District, Cleveland, listed on the NRHP in Cleveland, Ohio
- Huron-Superior Streets Warehouse-Produce Historic District, Toledo, listed on the NRHP in Lucas County

=== Pennsylvania ===
- Strip District, Pittsburgh

=== South Carolina ===
- Waccamaw River Warehouse Historic District, Conway, listed on the NRHP in Horry County

=== South Dakota ===
- Old Courthouse and Warehouse Historic District, Sioux Falls, listed on the NRHP in Minnehaha County

=== Tennessee ===
- Market Street Warehouse Historic District, Chattanooga, listed on the NRHP in Hamilton County
- Johnson City Warehouse and Commerce Historic District, Johnson City, listed on the NRHP in Washington County
- Jackson Avenue Warehouse District, Knoxville, listed on the NRHP in Knox County
- Southern Terminal and Warehouse Historic District, Knoxville, listed on the NRHP in Knox County
- South Bluffs Warehouse Historic District, Memphis, listed on the NRHP in Shelby County

=== Texas ===
- EaDo, Houston
- Warehouse District, Austin
- West End Historic District, Dallas, Texas, Dallas

=== Utah ===
- Warehouse District, Salt Lake City, listed on the National Register of Historic Places in Salt Lake County

=== Virginia ===
- Danville Tobacco Warehouse and Residential District, Danville, listed on the NRHP in Danville
- Roanoke Warehouse Historic District, Roanoke, listed on the NRHP in Roanoke

=== Washington ===
- Desmet Avenue Warehouse Historic District, Spokane, listed on the NRHP in Spokane County
- Union Depot-Warehouse Historic District, Tacoma, listed on the NRHP in Pierce County

=== West Virginia ===
- Morgantown Wharf and Warehouse Historic District, Morgantown, listed on the NRHP in Monongalia County
- Wheeling Warehouse Historic District, Wheeling, listed on the NRHP in Ohio County

=== Wisconsin ===
- Historic Third Ward, Milwaukee, Milwaukee

== See also ==
- Arts district
- Loft apartment
