= National Register of Historic Places listings in Hamilton County, Tennessee =

Location of Hamilton County in Tennessee

This is a list of the National Register of Historic Places listings in Hamilton County, Tennessee.

This is intended to be a complete list of the properties and districts on the National Register of Historic Places in Hamilton County, Tennessee, United States. Latitude and longitude coordinates are provided for many National Register properties and districts; these locations may be seen together in a map.

There are 112 properties and districts listed on the National Register in the county, including one National Historic Landmark, the Moccasin Bend Archeological District. Another 7 properties were once listed but have been removed.

Contents: Counties in Tennessee
Anderson – Bedford – Benton – Bledsoe – Blount – Bradley – Campbell – Cannon – Carroll – Carter – Cheatham – Chester – Claiborne – Clay – Cocke – Coffee – Crockett – Cumberland – Davidson – Decatur – DeKalb – Dickson – Dyer – Fayette – Fentress – Franklin – Gibson – Giles – Grainger – Greene – Grundy – Hamblen – Hamilton – Hancock – Hardeman – Hardin – Hawkins – Haywood – Henderson – Henry – Hickman – Houston – Humphreys – Jackson – Jefferson – Johnson – Knox – Lake – Lauderdale – Lawrence – Lewis – Lincoln – Loudon – Macon – Madison – Marion – Marshall – Maury – McMinn – McNairy – Meigs – Monroe – Montgomery – Moore – Morgan – Obion – Overton – Perry – Pickett – Polk – Putnam – Rhea – Roane – Robertson – Rutherford – Scott – Sequatchie – Sevier – Shelby – Smith – Stewart – Sullivan – Sumner – Tipton – Trousdale – Unicoi – Union – Van Buren – Warren – Washington – Wayne – Weakley – White – Williamson – Wilson

This National Park Service list is complete through NPS recent listings posted October 2, 2026.

== Current listings ==
	Name on the Register	Image	Date listed	Location	City or town	Description
1	Audubon Acres Site (40 HA 84)	Audubon Acres Site (40 HA 84)	October 7, 1982 (#82001728)	900 N Sanctuary Rd. 34°59′58″N 85°10′49″W	Chattanooga	
2	Bachman-McCoy Farm	Bachman-McCoy Farm	December 2, 2024 (#100004697)	1715 Anderson Pike; 35°08′50″N 85°19′09″W	Walden	
3	Nathan L. Bachman School	Nathan L. Bachman School	April 17, 2001 (#01000381)	2815 Anderson Pike; 35°09′47″N 85°19′20″W	Walden	
4	Beck Knob Cemetery	Beck Knob Cemetery	June 29, 2021 (#100006714)	875 Dartmouth St. 35°04′38″N 85°17′48″W	Chattanooga	
5	Birchwood School		December 18, 2025 (#100012408)	5623 TN-60; 35°21′30″N 84°59′33″W	Birchwood	Now serves as a community center.
6	Bonny Oaks	Bonny Oaks	August 11, 1980 (#80003803)	5114 Bonny Oaks Dr. 35°04′20″N 85°11′01″W	Chattanooga	
7	Brabson House	Brabson House	April 11, 1973 (#73001772)	407 E. 5th St. 35°03′05″N 85°18′16″W	Chattanooga	
8	Brainerd Junior High	Brainerd Junior High	September 15, 1980 (#80003804)	4201 Cherryton Dr. 35°01′06″N 85°14′07″W	Chattanooga	
9	Brainerd Mission Cemetery	Brainerd Mission Cemetery	December 6, 1979 (#79002435)	5700 Eastgate Loop; 35°00′43″N 85°12′46″W	Chattanooga	
10	Brown House	Brown House	April 11, 1973 (#73001781)	9521 Ooltewah-Georgetown Rd. 35°11′21″N 85°01′16″W	Ooltewah	
11	Brown's Ferry Tavern	Brown's Ferry Tavern	March 24, 1971 (#71000822)	Brown's Ferry Rd. 35°02′41″N 85°21′19″W	Chattanooga	
12	Central Block Building	Central Block Building	September 1, 1995 (#95000293)	630-638 Market St. 35°02′55″N 85°18′35″W	Chattanooga	
13	Chattanooga Bank Building	Chattanooga Bank Building	September 15, 1980 (#80003805)	8th St. 35°02′50″N 85°18′36″W	Chattanooga	
14	Chattanooga Car Barns	Chattanooga Car Barns	July 9, 1979 (#79002436)	301 Market St. 35°03′12″N 85°18′37″W	Chattanooga	Demolished in 2025
15	Chattanooga Electric Railway	Chattanooga Electric Railway	February 29, 1980 (#80003806)	211-241 Market St. 35°03′13″N 85°18′36″W	Chattanooga	
16	Chattanooga National Cemetery	Chattanooga National Cemetery	September 16, 1996 (#96001013)	1200 Bailey Ave. 35°02′06″N 85°17′23″W	Chattanooga	
17	Chattanooga Plow Power House	Chattanooga Plow Power House	October 7, 1999 (#99001243)	1633-1635 Chestnut St. 35°02′14″N 85°18′52″W	Chattanooga	
18	Chattanooga, Harrison, Georgetown & Charleston Railroad Tunnel		August 24, 1978 (#78002595)	Below N. Crest Rd. 35°03′51″N 85°14′20″W	Chattanooga	
19	Chickamauga and Chattanooga National Military Park	Chickamauga and Chattanooga National Military Park	October 15, 1966 (#66000274)	South of Chattanooga on U.S. Route 27; 34°58′09″N 85°17′07″W	Chattanooga	extends into Catoosa County, Georgia, is administered by the National Park Service
20	Chickamauga Hydroelectric Project	Chickamauga Hydroelectric Project	August 11, 2017 (#100001466)	5400 Lake Resort Dr. 35°06′14″N 85°13′46″W	Chattanooga	
21	Christ Church Episcopal	Christ Church Episcopal	April 9, 2021 (#100006386)	663 Douglas St. 35°02′46″N 85°18′06″W	Chattanooga	
22	Civil War Fortification		January 31, 1976 (#76001779)	Bonny Oaks Dr. 35°04′06″N 85°09′12″W	Chattanooga	
23	Connor Toll House	Connor Toll House	August 22, 1977 (#77001273)	4212 Anderson Pike; 35°10′45″N 85°20′11″W	Signal Mountain	
24	Crane Building	Crane Building	November 10, 1983 (#83004246)	1317 Chestnut St. 35°02′24″N 85°18′45″W	Chattanooga	
25	Cravens-Coleman House	Cravens-Coleman House	October 25, 1990 (#90001655)	1 Cravens Terrace; 35°00′49″N 85°20′26″W	Chattanooga	The photo is not the Cravens-Coleman House. The photo is the Cravens House which is up the hill.
26	Judge Will Cummings House		July 3, 1980 (#80003807)	West of Chattanooga at 4025 Cummings Rd. 35°01′03″N 85°23′33″W	Chattanooga	
27	Dixie Mercerizing Company	Dixie Mercerizing Company	July 20, 2020 (#100005374)	951 South Watkins St. 35°01′40″N 85°16′15″W	Chattanooga	
28	Hiram Douglas House	Hiram Douglas House	April 24, 1973 (#73001782)	About 5 miles north of Ooltewah on Snow Hill Rd. 35°08′08″N 85°04′07″W	Ooltewah	
29	Downtown Chattanooga Historic District	Downtown Chattanooga Historic District	July 23, 2020 (#100005387)	Roughly bounded by Martin Luther King Jr. Blvd., Georgia Ave., East 5th St., Walnut St., East 6th St., and Chestnut St. 35°02′49″N 85°18′34″W	Chattanooga	
30	East Tennessee Iron Manufacturing Company Blast Furnace		May 8, 1980 (#80003808)	Address Restricted	Chattanooga	
31	Engel Stadium	Engel Stadium	November 19, 2009 (#09000954)	O'Neal St. and E. 3rd St. 35°02′43″N 85°17′12″W	Chattanooga	
32	Faxon-Thomas Mansion	Faxon-Thomas Mansion	November 25, 1980 (#80003809)	10 Bluff View Ave. 35°03′21″N 85°18′21″W	Chattanooga	
33	Ferger Place Historic District	Ferger Place Historic District	May 1, 1980 (#80003810)	Evening Side Dr. and Morning Side Dr. 35°01′30″N 85°17′04″W	Chattanooga	
34	First Baptist Church Education Building	First Baptist Church Education Building	February 29, 1980 (#80003811)	317 Oak St. 35°02′56″N 85°18′21″W	Chattanooga	
35	First Congregational Church	First Congregational Church	July 22, 2010 (#10000491)	901 Lindsay St. 35°02′42″N 85°18′26″W	Chattanooga	
36	First Presbyterian Church	First Presbyterian Church	November 18, 2009 (#09000955)	554 McCallie Ave. 35°02′47″N 85°18′10″W	Chattanooga	
37	Fort Wood Historic District	Fort Wood Historic District	April 18, 1979 (#79002437)	Roughly bounded by Palmetto, McCallie, Central, and 5th Sts. 35°02′42″N 85°17′34″W	Chattanooga	
38	Fountain Square	Fountain Square	March 28, 1979 (#79002438)	600-622 Georgia Ave. and 317 Oak St. 35°02′58″N 85°18′22″W	Chattanooga	
39	Gaskill House	Gaskill House	December 6, 1979 (#79002439)	427 E. 5th St. 35°03′03″N 85°18′14″W	Chattanooga	
40	Glenwood Historic District	Glenwood Historic District	July 25, 1989 (#89000861)	Roughly bounded by Parkwood Dr., Glenwood Dr., Oak St., and Derby St. 35°02′16″N 85°15′49″W	Chattanooga	
41	Hamilton County Courthouse	Hamilton County Courthouse	November 21, 1978 (#78002596)	W. 6th St. and Georgia Ave. 35°02′58″N 85°18′25″W	Chattanooga	
42	Hampton Place Archeological Site (40HA146)		May 22, 1984 (#84003548)	Address Restricted	Chattanooga	
43	Highland Park Methodist Episcopal Church	Highland Park Methodist Episcopal Church	February 29, 1980 (#80003813)	1900 Bailey Ave. 35°02′01″N 85°16′32″W	Chattanooga	
44	Highland Park Methodist Episcopal Church, South	Highland Park Methodist Episcopal Church, South	March 12, 2012 (#12000118)	1918 Union Ave. 35°01′55″N 85°16′32″W	Chattanooga	Renamed in 1938 to St. Andrew's Methodist Church. Closed in 2004.
45	Hutcheson House	Hutcheson House	November 21, 1978 (#78002597)	360 S. Crest Rd. 35°00′29″N 85°16′09″W	Chattanooga	
46	Caleb Isbester House	Caleb Isbester House	March 25, 1982 (#82003975)	551 Oak St. 35°02′53″N 85°18′14″W	Chattanooga	
47	James Building	James Building	February 29, 1980 (#80003814)	735 Broad St. 35°02′50″N 85°18′37″W	Chattanooga	
48	James County Courthouse	James County Courthouse	November 7, 1976 (#76001782)	Mulberry St. 35°04′17″N 85°03′37″W	Ooltewah	County courthouse for James County, which was merged into Hamilton County after its bankruptcy in 1919.
49	Clarence T. Jones Observatory	Clarence T. Jones Observatory	November 20, 2009 (#09000949)	10 N. Tuxedo Ave. 35°01′01″N 85°14′12″W	Chattanooga	Still in use
50	Kelley House	Kelley House	May 14, 1980 (#80003815)	1903 McCallie Ave. 35°02′08″N 85°16′27″W	Chattanooga	
51	M.L. King Boulevard Historic District	M.L. King Boulevard Historic District	March 20, 1984 (#84003551)	Roughly M. L. King Boulevard between Browns and University Sts. 35°02′38″N 85°18′14″W	Chattanooga	
52	Lookout Mountain Caverns and Cavern Castle	Lookout Mountain Caverns and Cavern Castle	November 26, 1985 (#85002969)	Scenic Highway; 35°01′09″N 85°20′22″W	Chattanooga	
53	Lookout Mountain Incline Railway	Lookout Mountain Incline Railway	April 26, 1973 (#73001774)	Off U.S. Route 11; 35°00′28″N 85°20′08″W	Chattanooga	
54	Louise Terrace Apartments	Louise Terrace Apartments	October 30, 1998 (#98001306)	314 and 316 Walnut St. 35°03′10″N 85°18′27″W	Chattanooga	
55	Maclellan Building	Maclellan Building	April 4, 1985 (#85000708)	721 Broad St. 35°02′51″N 85°18′36″W	Chattanooga	
56	Mallards Dozen Archeological Site (40HA147)		May 22, 1984 (#84003552)	Address Restricted	Chattanooga	
57	Market and Main Streets Historic District	Market and Main Streets Historic District	July 24, 1992 (#92000927)	Roughly bounded by Cowart, King, Market, and Main Sts. 35°02′18″N 85°18′28″W	Chattanooga	
58	Market Square-Patten Parkway	Market Square-Patten Parkway	May 1, 1980 (#80003816)	Roughly bounded by E. 8th and E. 9th Sts. and Georgia and Lindsay Aves. 35°02′46″N 85°18′27″W	Chattanooga	
59	Market Street Bridge	Market Street Bridge	December 20, 2010 (#10001047)	Market St. over the Tennessee River; 35°03′31″N 85°18′33″W	Chattanooga	Also known as the Chief John Ross Bridge
60	Market Street Warehouse Historic District	Market Street Warehouse Historic District	April 5, 1984 (#84003554)	1118-1148 Market St. 35°02′35″N 85°18′32″W	Chattanooga	
61	Pleasant L. Matthews House		December 12, 1976 (#76001781)	Southwest of Georgetown on Ooltewah-Georgetown Rd. 35°16′38″N 84°57′57″W	Georgetown	
62	Chancellor T.M. McConnell House	Chancellor T.M. McConnell House	April 17, 1992 (#92000314)	517 E. 5th St. 35°03′02″N 85°18′10″W	Chattanooga	
63	Medical Arts Building	Medical Arts Building	September 15, 1980 (#80003817)	McCallie Ave. 35°02′45″N 85°18′09″W	Chattanooga	
64	Mikado Locomotive No. 4501	Mikado Locomotive No. 4501	March 28, 1979 (#79002440)	2202 N. Chamberlain Ave. 35°03′43″N 85°15′01″W	Chattanooga	
65	Miller Brothers Department Store	Miller Brothers Department Store	September 17, 1987 (#87001115)	629 Market St. 35°02′56″N 85°18′34″W	Chattanooga	
66	Missionary Ridge Historic District	Missionary Ridge Historic District	September 5, 1996 (#95001257)	N. and S. Crest Rd. from Delong Reservation to 700 S. Crest Rd. 35°00′48″N 85°15′56″W	Chattanooga	
67	Moccasin Bend Archeological District	Moccasin Bend Archeological District	September 8, 1986 (#86003510)	Address Restricted; 35°02′09″N 85°20′12″W	Chattanooga	
68	Model Electric Home	Model Electric Home	July 15, 1993 (#93000645)	1516 Sunset Rd. 35°04′33″N 85°17′07″W	Chattanooga	
69	Municipal Building	Municipal Building	February 29, 1980 (#80003818)	E. 11th St. 35°02′36″N 85°18′27″W	Chattanooga	
70	Northside United Presbyterian	Northside United Presbyterian	September 15, 1980 (#80003820)	923 Mississippi Ave. 35°04′10″N 85°17′41″W	Chattanooga	
71	Oak Grove Elementary School	Oak Grove Elementary School	July 6, 2011 (#11000420)	1912 S. Willow St. 35°01′14″N 85°16′45″W	Chattanooga	
72	Ochs Building	Ochs Building	November 17, 1978 (#78002598)	Georgia Ave. 35°02′50″N 85°18′26″W	Chattanooga	
73	Old Library Building	Old Library Building	March 14, 1973 (#73001776)	200 E. 8th St. 35°02′48″N 85°18′26″W	Chattanooga	
74	Old Post Office	Old Post Office	April 13, 1973 (#73001777)	E. 11th and Lindsay Sts. 35°02′37″N 85°18′27″W	Chattanooga	
75	Pleasant Garden Cemetery	Pleasant Garden Cemetery	April 7, 2025 (#100011639)	306 Rowe Road; 35°02′00″N 85°15′02″W	Chattanooga	
76	Price-Evans Foundry	Price-Evans Foundry	June 28, 2021 (#100006713)	901 South Holtzclaw Ave. 35°02′03″N 85°17′07″W	Chattanooga	
77	Read House	Read House	December 23, 1976 (#76001780)	Broad and 9th Sts. 35°02′46″N 85°18′39″W	Chattanooga	
78	Ridgedale Lodge	Ridgedale Lodge	July 7, 2022 (#100007916)	2602 East Main St. 35°01′20″N 85°16′10″W	Chattanooga	
79	Ridgedale Methodist Episcopal Church	Ridgedale Methodist Episcopal Church	July 30, 2010 (#10000509)	1518 Dodds Ave. 35°01′15″N 85°16′12″W	Chattanooga vicinity	
80	Ross's Landing	Ross's Landing	June 27, 1974 (#74001914)	Riverfront Parkway west of Market St. 35°03′23″N 85°18′32″W	Chattanooga	
81	St. Elmo Historic District	St. Elmo Historic District	April 15, 1982 (#82003976)	Alabama, St. Elmo, and Tennessee Aves. 34°59′48″N 85°19′44″W	Chattanooga	
82	St. Marks United Methodist Church		March 23, 2026 (#100012849)	701 Mississippi Avenue; 35°04′22″N 85°17′58″W	Chattanooga	
83	St. Paul's Episcopal Church	St. Paul's Episcopal Church	September 1, 1978 (#78002599)	7th and Pine Sts. 35°02′55″N 85°18′47″W	Chattanooga	
84	Saints Peter and Paul Catholic Church and Buildings	Saints Peter and Paul Catholic Church and Buildings	December 11, 1979 (#79002441)	214 E. 8th St. 35°02′47″N 85°18′23″W	Chattanooga	
85	Robert Schwartz and Company Building	Robert Schwartz and Company Building	July 19, 1984 (#84003555)	736-738 Cherry St. 35°02′50″N 85°18′29″W	Chattanooga	
86	Second Presbyterian Church	Second Presbyterian Church	February 29, 1980 (#80003822)	700 Pine St. 35°02′53″N 85°18′45″W	Chattanooga	
87	Seamour and Gerte Shavin House	Seamour and Gerte Shavin House	March 23, 1993 (#93000149)	334 N. Crest Rd. 35°03′07″N 85°15′01″W	Chattanooga	
88	Shiloh Baptist Church	Shiloh Baptist Church	January 19, 1979 (#79002442)	506 E. 8th St. 35°02′43″N 85°18′11″W	Chattanooga	
89	Signal Knitting Mills	Signal Knitting Mills	March 5, 1999 (#99000281)	205 Manufacturers Rd. 35°03′46″N 85°18′47″W	Chattanooga	
90	Signal Mountain Elementary School	Signal Mountain Elementary School	April 19, 2001 (#01000395)	809 Kentucky Ave. 35°07′30″N 85°20′44″W	Signal Mountain	
91	Signal Mountain Historic District	Signal Mountain Historic District	October 5, 2001 (#01000729)	Roughly along James Boulevard, Brady Point Rd., and Signal Point Rd. 35°07′17″N 85°21′27″W	Signal Mountain	
92	Soldiers and Sailors Memorial Auditorium	Soldiers and Sailors Memorial Auditorium	September 15, 1980 (#80003823)	McCallie Ave. 35°02′52″N 85°18′21″W	Chattanooga	
93	Southern Railway Freight Depot	Southern Railway Freight Depot	June 16, 1983 (#83003038)	1140 Newby St. 35°02′30″N 85°18′30″W	Chattanooga	
94	Standard-Coosa-Thatcher Mills	Standard-Coosa-Thatcher Mills	December 29, 2014 (#14001106)	1800 Watkins St. 35°01′10″N 85°16′29″W	Chattanooga	
95	Stone Fort Land Company Historic District	Stone Fort Land Company Historic District	July 1, 1999 (#99000786)	10th, Newby, E. 11th, and Market Sts. 35°02′45″N 85°18′28″W	Chattanooga	
96	Stringer Ridge Historic District	Stringer Ridge Historic District	May 22, 1984 (#84003557)	Address Restricted	Chattanooga	
97	Tennessee Valley Railroad Museum Rolling Stock	Tennessee Valley Railroad Museum Rolling Stock	August 6, 1980 (#80003824)	2022 N. Chamberlain Ave. 35°03′52″N 85°13′31″W	Chattanooga	
98	Terminal Station	Terminal Station	February 20, 1973 (#73001778)	1434 Market St. 35°02′13″N 85°18′25″W	Chattanooga	
99	Tivoli Theater	Tivoli Theater	April 11, 1973 (#73001779)	709 Broad St. 35°02′52″N 85°18′37″W	Chattanooga	
100	Topside	Topside	April 11, 1973 (#73001783)	North of Signal Mountain off State Route 8 on Wilson Ave. 35°09′57″N 85°18′28″W	Signal Mountain	
101	Trigg-Smartt Building	Trigg-Smartt Building	June 26, 1986 (#86001383)	701-707 Broad St. 35°02′54″N 85°18′38″W	Chattanooga	
102	Turnbull Cone and Machine Company	Turnbull Cone and Machine Company	July 15, 1992 (#92000848)	1400 Fort and W. 14th Sts. 35°02′22″N 85°18′52″W	Chattanooga	
103	U.S. Post Office	U.S. Post Office	February 29, 1980 (#80003827)	900 Georgia Ave. 35°02′42″N 85°18′30″W	Chattanooga	
104	Vulcan Archeological Site (40HA140)		May 22, 1984 (#84003558)	Address Restricted	Chattanooga	
105	"W" Road	"W" Road	March 19, 1999 (#99000277)	W Rd. from Spring St. east 0.4 miles 35°08′42″N 85°18′53″W	Walden	
106	Walden's Ridge Civic Center	Walden's Ridge Civic Center	January 26, 2026 (#100012615)	2501 Fairmount Pike; 35°09′48″N 85°18′49″W	Walden	
107	Walnut Street Bridge	Walnut Street Bridge	February 23, 1990 (#90000300)	Walnut St., over the Tennessee River; 35°03′44″N 85°18′23″W	Chattanooga	Formerly a road bridge for automobiles and streetcars, was closed to motor vehicles in 1978 and was eventually converted to a pedestrian bridge.
108	Wauhatchie Pike	Wauhatchie Pike	July 11, 2001 (#01000727)	Old Wauhatchie Pike; 35°01′10″N 85°20′22″W	Lookout Mountain	
109	Wiley United Methodist Church	Wiley United Methodist Church	August 1, 1979 (#79002443)	504 Lookout St. 35°03′03″N 85°18′22″W	Chattanooga	
110	Frances Willard House	Frances Willard House	February 29, 1980 (#80003828)	615 Lindsay St. 35°02′58″N 85°18′18″W	Chattanooga	
111	Williams Island	Williams Island	April 11, 1973 (#73001780)	On Williams Island in the Tennessee River northwest of central Chattanooga; 35°05′00″N 85°20′45″W	Chattanooga	
112	Woodland Mound Archeological District		May 22, 1984 (#84003562)	Address Restricted	Chattanooga	
113	Wyatt Hall	Wyatt Hall	October 23, 1986 (#86002897)	865 E. 3rd St. 35°02′59″N 85°17′40″W	Chattanooga	

== Former listings ==
	Name on the Register	Image	Date listed	Date removed	Location	City or town	Description
1	Chattanooga Union Depot		April 16, 1971 (#71001071)	June 11, 1973	W. 9th and Broad Sts.	Chattanooga	Demolished in 1973. Not to be confused with Chattanooga Terminal Station
2	East Side Junior High School		March 6, 1987 (#87000392)	April 21, 2003	2200 E. Main Street	Chattanooga	Demolished, now Eastside Elementary School
3	Richard Hardy Junior High School		September 15, 1980 (#80003812)	July 13, 2006	2115 Dodson Avenue	Chattanooga	Demolished and replaced with Hardy Elementary School
4	News-Pound Building		September 15, 1980 (#80003819)	May 23, 1988	E. 11th St.	Chattanooga	
5	Newton Chevrolet Building		April 2, 1973 (#73001775)	July 13, 2006	329 Market Street	Chattanooga	Current occupant is Chattanooga Allergy Clinic
6	Park Hotel	Park Hotel	August 18, 1980 (#80003821)	July 13, 2006	117 East 7th Street	Chattanooga	Renamed Newell Tower
7	Benjamin F. Thomas House		December 3, 1980 (#80003825)	July 13, 2006	938 McCallie Avenue	Chattanooga	Destroyed by a fire. Now an empty lot.
8	Trinity Methodist Episcopal Church	Trinity Methodist Episcopal Church	February 29, 1980 (#80003826)	October 28, 2021	McCallie Ave. 35°02′33″N 85°17′37″W	Chattanooga	

== See also ==
- List of National Historic Landmarks in Tennessee
- National Register of Historic Places listings in Tennessee
