= Hairpin turn =

Acute curve (often one of a series) in a road, especially on a steep incline

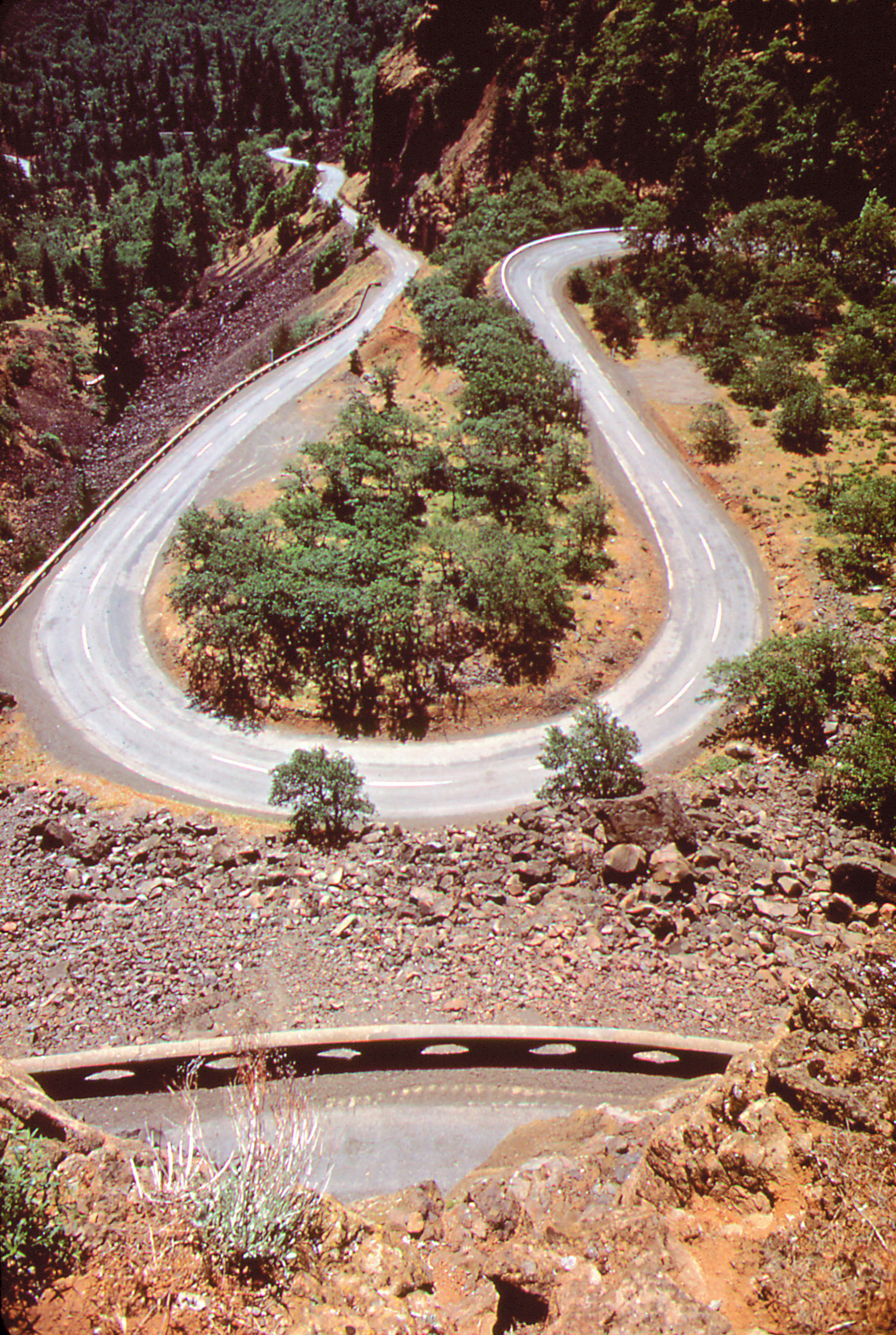
Hairpin turn in Oregon, US

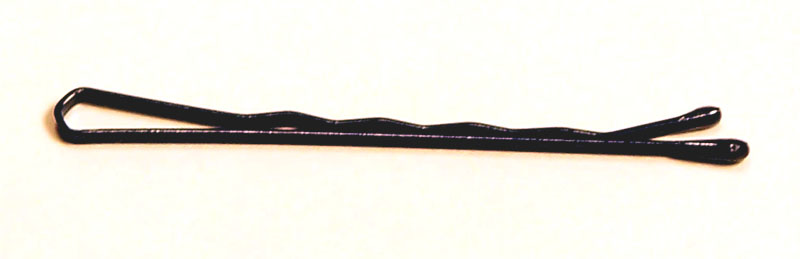
A hairpin, after which the feature is named

A hairpin turn (also hairpin bend, hairpin curve, or hairpin corner) is a bend in a road with a very acute inner angle, making it necessary for a vehicle to turn about 180° to continue on the road. It is named for its resemblance to a bent metal hairpin. Such turns in ramps and trails may be called switchbacks in American English, by analogy with switchback railways.

== Description ==
Hairpin turns are often used in order to decrease the steepness of the grade where a road climbs a steep slope, and are often arrayed in a zigzag pattern. Hairpin turns allow easier and safer ascents and descents of mountainous terrain than does a direct and steep climb and descent, although at the price of greater travel distances and usually lower speed limits because of the sharpness of the curves. Highways of this style are also generally less costly to build and maintain than highways with tunnels.

On occasion, the road may loop completely, using a tunnel or bridge to cross itself at a different elevation (on Reunion Island, 21°10′52″S 55°27′17″E, and near Ashland, Oregon, 42°05′31″N 122°35′21″W). When this routing geometry is used for a rail line, it is called a spiral or a spiral loop.

In trails and footpaths, stairways may be used instead of switchbacks.

== Notable hairpin turns ==
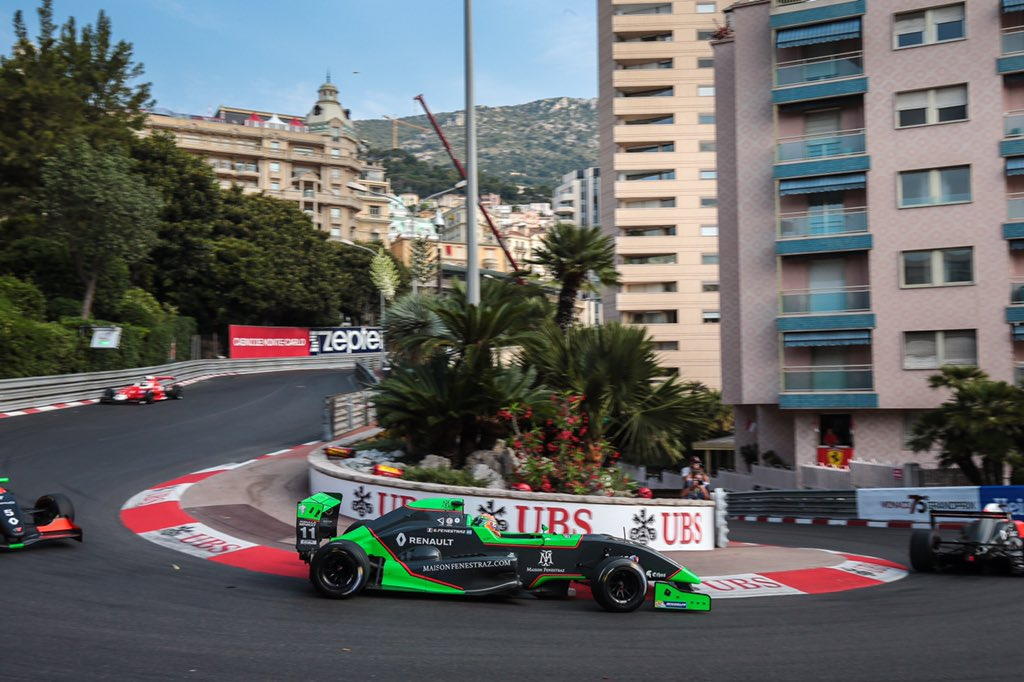
Looking into the Fairmont Hairpin, Monaco

- Clarks Summit, Pennsylvania, at the north end of Interstate 476 (eases the grade for trucks)
- Devil's Elbow, Isle of Man – Hairpin bend on a road in the Isle of Man
- Governor's Bridge (Isle of Man)
- Ramsey Hairpin – Point on the Snaefell Mountain Course in the Isle of Man
- Fairmont Hairpin – hairpin bend at the Fairmont Monte Carlo on the Circuit de Monaco
- Sitinjau Lauik – hairpin bend at the Padang City and Solok road. Part of national road and Sumatra highway
- Trollstigen, Norway
- "W" Road, Chattanooga, Tennessee

== Railways ==
Where a railway curves back on itself like a hairpin turn, it is called a horseshoe curve. The Pennsylvania Railroad built one in Blair County, Pennsylvania, which ascends the Eastern Continental Divide from the east. However, the radius of curvature is much larger than that of a typical road hairpin. See this example at Zlatoust or hillclimbing for other railway ascent methods.

== Skiing ==
Sections known as hairpins are also found in the slalom discipline of alpine skiing. A hairpin consists of two consecutive vertical or "closed gates", which must be negotiated very quickly. Three or more consecutive closed gates are known as a flush.

== See also ==
- Dead Man's Curve
- Spiral bridge
- Zig zag (railway)
- U-turn
