= Connor Toll House =

- U.S. National Register of Historic Places
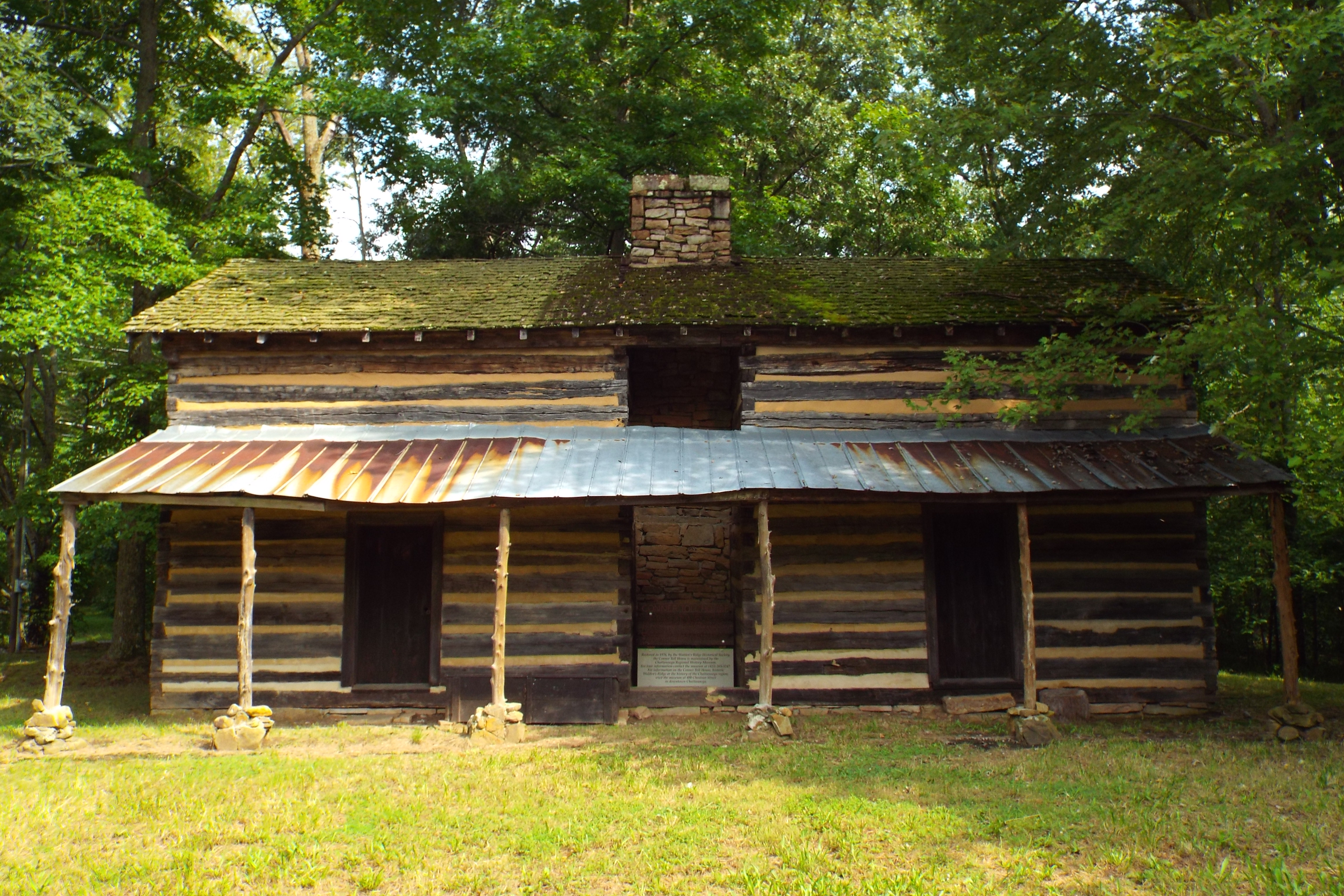
- Location: 4212 Anderson Pike, Signal Mountain, Tennessee
- Area: 0.5 acres (0.20 ha)
- Built: 1858
- Built by: James C. Connor
- NRHP reference No.: 77001273
- Added to NRHP: August 22, 1977

The Connor Toll House is a historic log cabin located near the town of Signal Mountain, Tennessee, United States. It is listed on the National Register of Historic Places.

== History ==
The Connor Toll House was built in 1858 by James C. Conner. James Conner moved from North Carolina to Hamilton County, Tennessee in 1842. In 1847, he and George Rogers were granted 1,000 acres on Walden's Ridge by Conner's father-in-law, Elisha Rogers. James and his wife, Kizzah, moved their family to Walden's Ridge in July 1858, and shortly thereafter built the home.

During the Civil War, the Connor Toll House found service as a message relay station for the Union army. Messages were sent by flashes of fire from Chattanooga to Signal Point. The message was then relayed across Walden's Ridge, and then by fire flash to Jasper in the Sequatchie Valley. The land near the Connor House also served as place to house horses and mules that were too tired or sick to continue hauling people and goods up the steep sides of Walden's Ridge. A corral was built nearby in October 1863, and reportedly had housed nearly 1,500 mules by November 1863.

The Connor Toll House also played a role in the development of a transportation network across Walden's Ridge. For many years, the only reliable route up Chattanooga to Walden's Ridge was the "W" Road. This operated as a toll road, and until the Civil War the toll gate was located at Elisha Roger's home, which was the first house at the top of the road. After the war, the toll gate was moved to the Connor Toll House on Anderson Pike, where it remained until 1892.

In addition to operating the toll gate, James Connor served in the Tennessee General Assembly, and three terms as sheriff of Hamilton County. The house was occupied by members of the Connor family until 1975. It was purchased and restored by the Walden's Ridge Historical Association in 1976, and listed on the National Register of Historic Places in 1977.
