= Clarence T. Jones Observatory =

Astronomical observatory in Tennessee, US

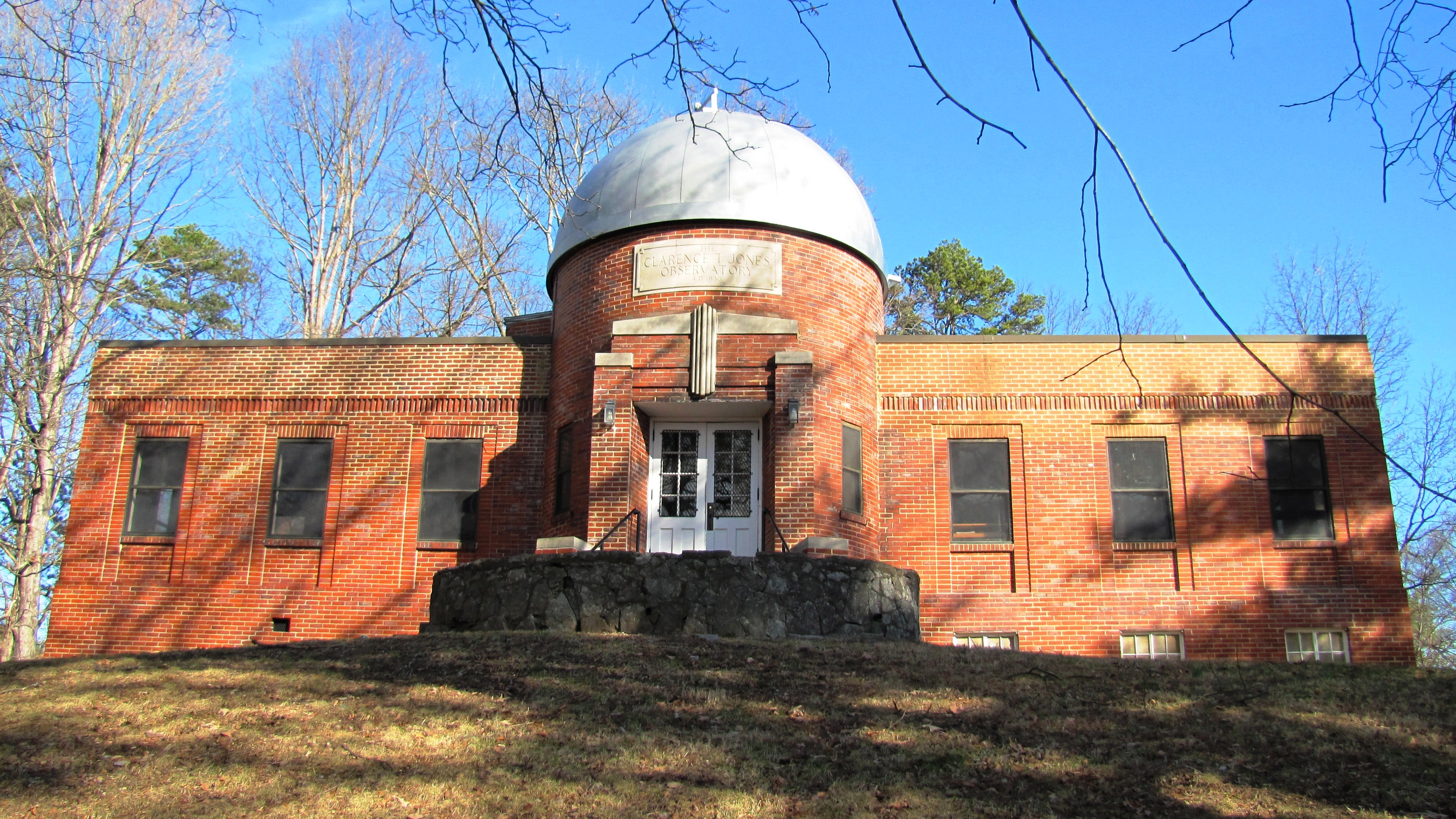
- Organization: University of Tennessee at Chattanooga
- Location: Chattanooga, Tennessee (US)
- Coordinates: 35°01′03″N 85°14′07″W
- Website: www.utc.edu/chemistry-physics/jones-observatory

Clarence T. Jones Observatory is an astronomical observatory in Chattanooga, Tennessee (US), owned and operated by University of Tennessee at Chattanooga.

== History ==
The building was completed in 1936, and opened in 1938. Construction of the observatory and telescope were funded by a Federal Emergency Administration of Public Works grant for the students of Chattanooga's public schools at the urging of prominent local amateur astronomer Clarence T. Jones. Jones designed the facility. In 1944, the facility was transferred to the university (then the University of Chattanooga) via a 99-year lease and astronomy was added to the university curriculum.

The telescope is a Cassegrain reflector type with a 20.5-inch (52 cm) primary mirror. The mirror is one of many made by Corning Incorporated as a part of the research that allowed the pouring of the 200-inch mirror for the Hale Telescope.

The observatory was listed on the National Register of Historic Places in December 2009.

The observatory has several nights of public lessons and viewing between the months of October and April.

== See also ==
- List of observatories
