= Market Street Warehouse Historic District =

Historic district in Tennessee, United States

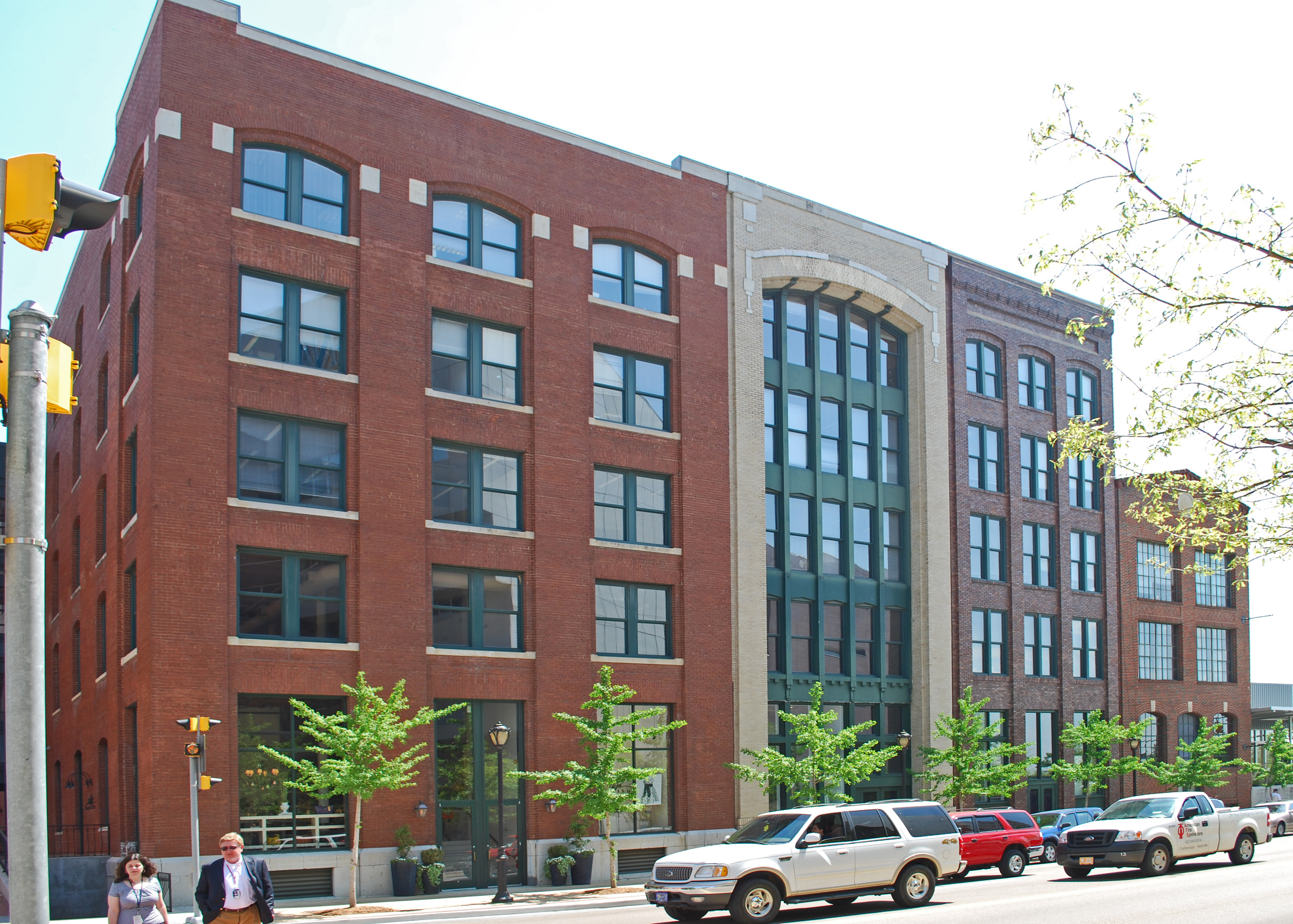

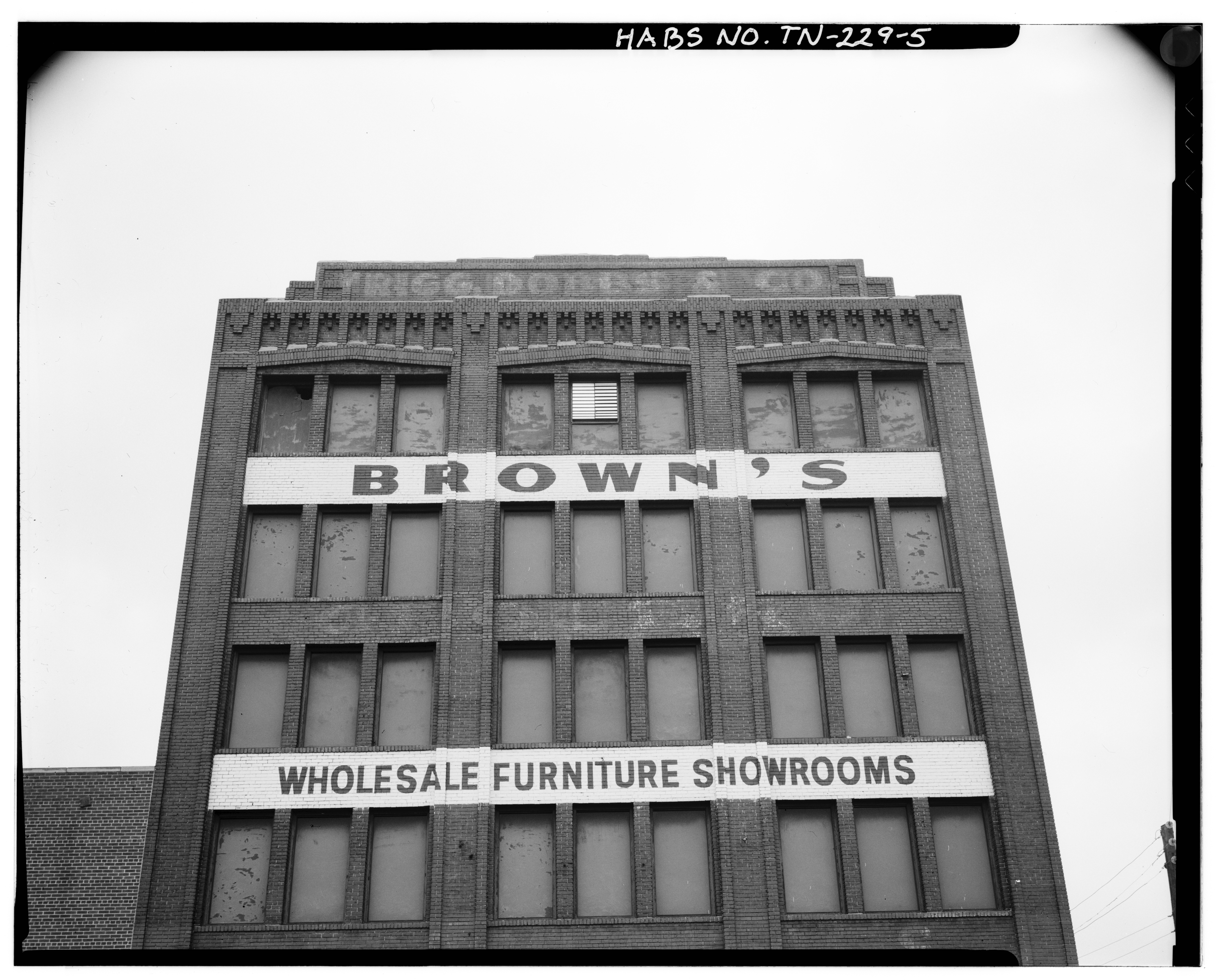
1152 Market Street in 1933

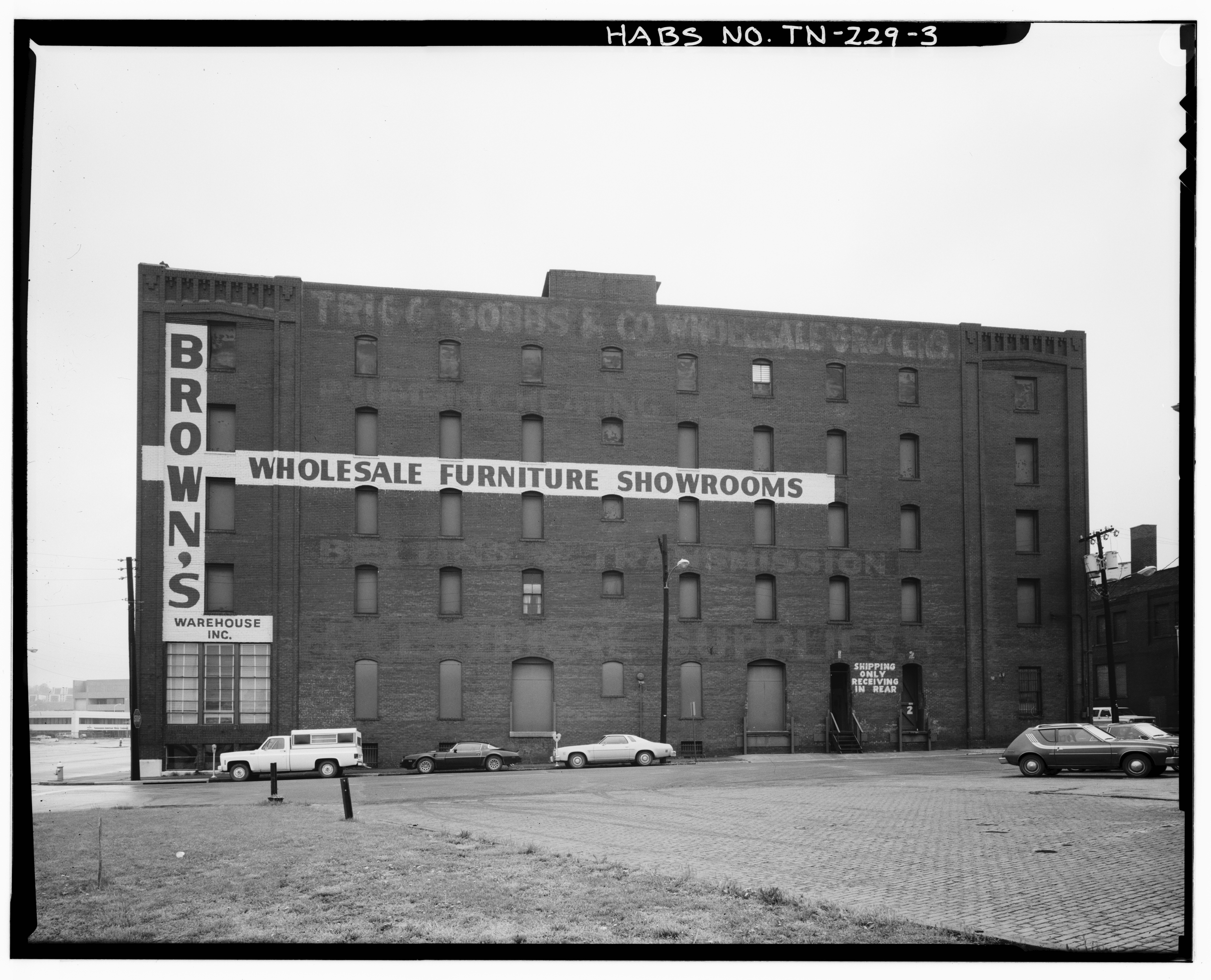

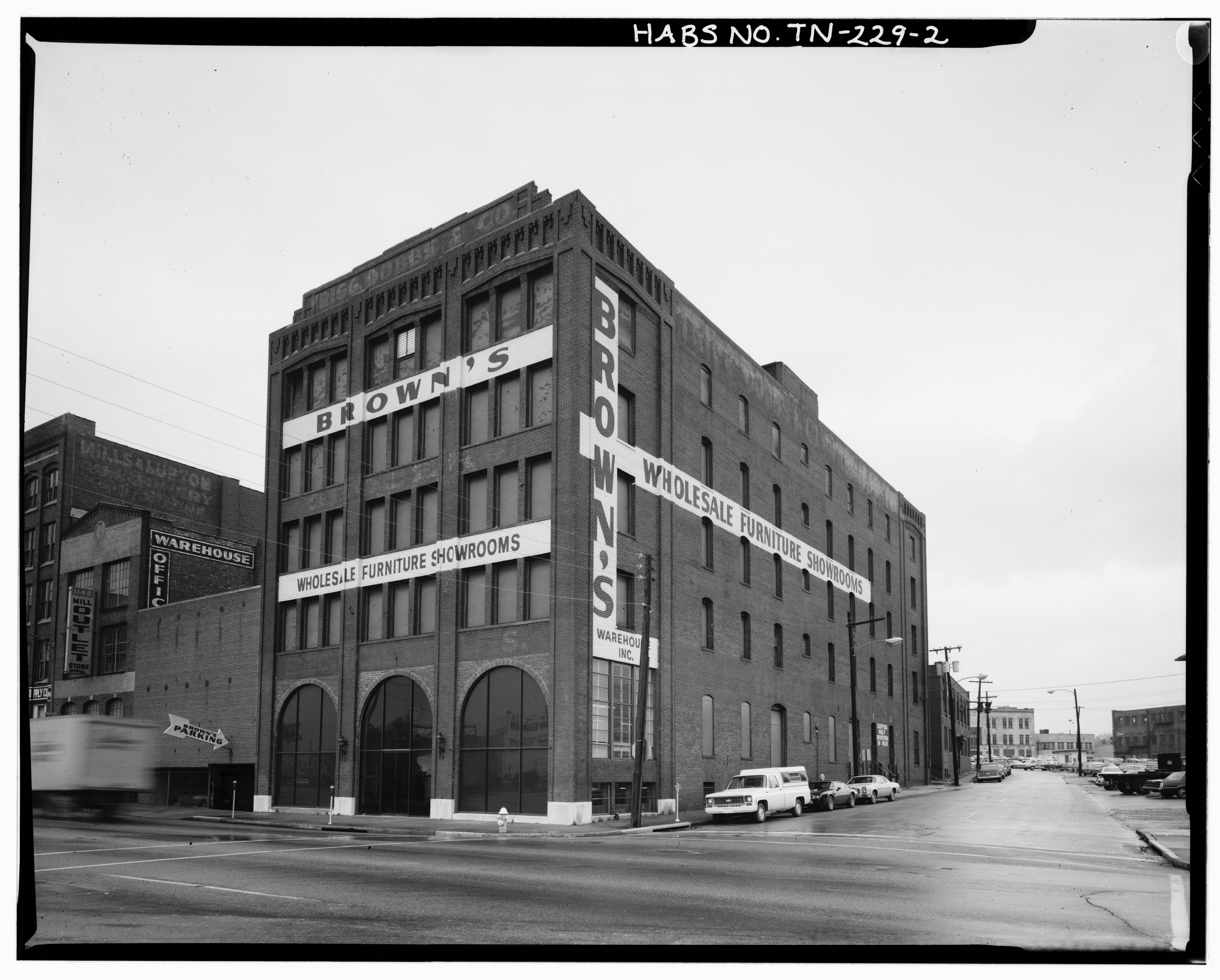

Market Street Warehouse Historic District is listed on the National Register of Historic Places and was built on the location of a former American Civil War fort.

Warehouse Row, Stone Fort Block 1118-1148 Market Street, is a collection of restaurants, retail shops and assorted businesses occupying the north and south buildings of a former knitting mill in Chattanooga, Tennessee.

== See also ==
- National Register of Historic Places listings in Hamilton County, Tennessee
