= Ferger Place Historic District =

Historic district in Tennessee, United States

- U.S. National Register of Historic Places
- U.S. Historic district
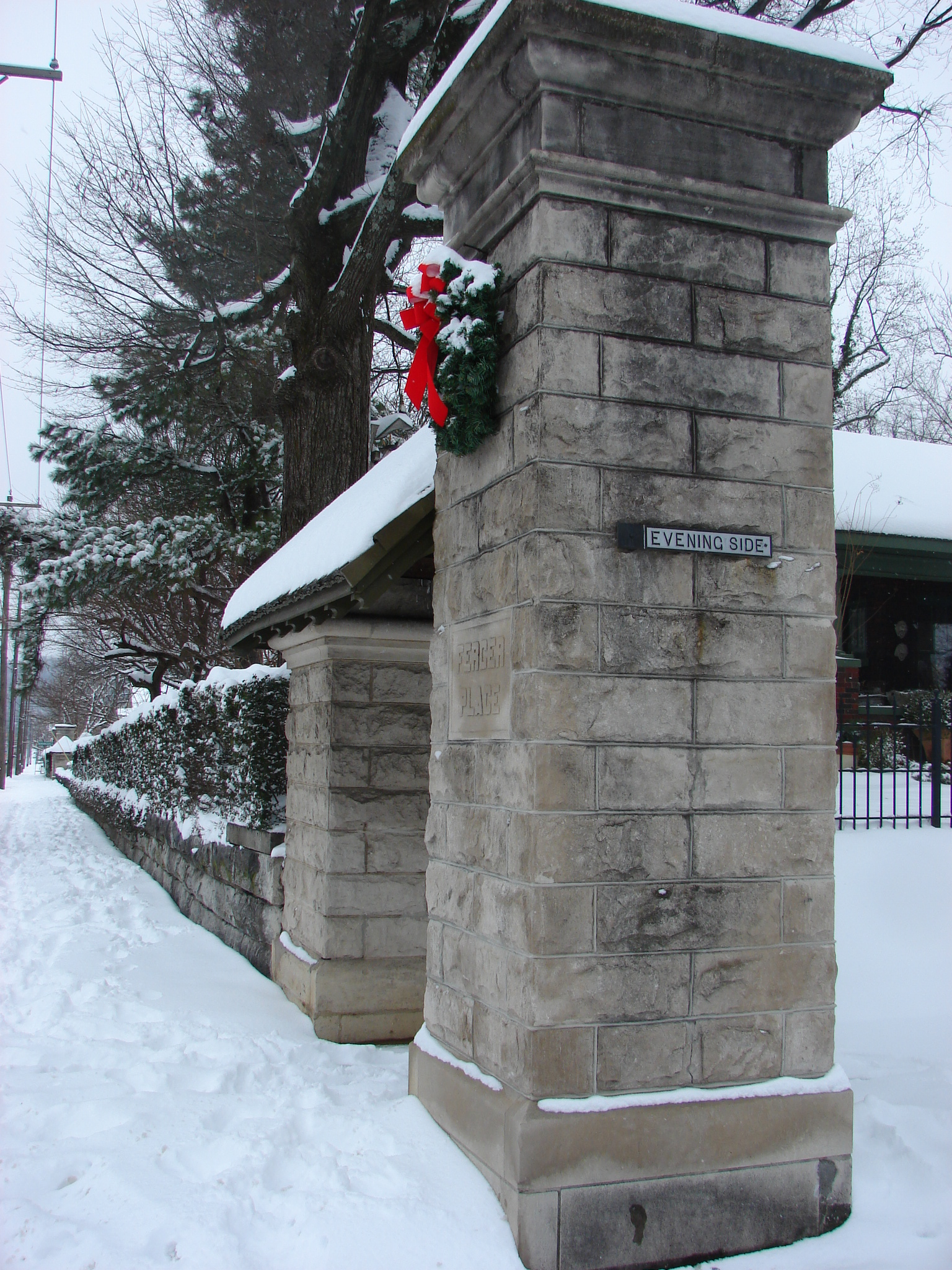
- Ferger Place Pillar Entrance

- Location within Tennessee Location within the United States
- Location: Evening Side Dr. and Morning Side Dr. Chattanooga, Tennessee
- Coordinates: 35°1′30″N 85°17′4″W
- Area: 24 acres (9.7 ha)
- Built: 1912
- Architect: Ferger Brothers Real Estate
- Architectural style: Late 19th and 20th century revivals, Bungalow/Craftsman
- NRHP reference No.: 80003810
- Added to NRHP: May 01, 1980

Ferger Place Historic District in Chattanooga, Tennessee was so named and added to the National Register of Historic Places in 1980. "Ferger Place" was founded in 1910 as the first exclusively White gated community ("restricted private park") south of the Mason–Dixon line. Founded by two wealthy investors, the Ferger Brothers, J. Fred Ferger and J. Herman Ferger, on the outskirts of town, and surrounded by a fence to keep grazing cattle out, Ferger Place attracted higher class families including wealthy businessmen and Government officials. Off of Main Street in east downtown Chattanooga, this 240-acre neighborhood includes a wide spectrum of architectural styles of homes and welcomes newcomers to its safety oriented community. Making up both Morningside and Eveningside Drives, the homes reflect an array of styles ranging from 1910 through the 1930s. The Historic Neighborhood is also known for its distinct 'U' shape of 69 beautiful homes.

As many new styles of homes evolved, Ferger Place remained a getaway from the changing society and stayed true to its classic, post-Victorian style. Houses included porches, open rooms, high ceilings, and multiple windows.

These Post-Victorian Architectural Styles specifically included:

- Craftsman Bungalow
- Contemporary Prairie
- Four Square
- Dutch Colonial
- Cottage Tutor Revival
- Italian Renaissance

The neighborhood is listed on the National Register of Historic Places for its architectural styles and layout. It includes a private park for residents of Ferger Place. Entrance to the neighborhood is marked by original pillars on Morningside and Eveningside Drives. The neighborhood reached its 100th anniversary in 2010 and represents a portion of the history of the City of Chattanooga.

== Gallery ==
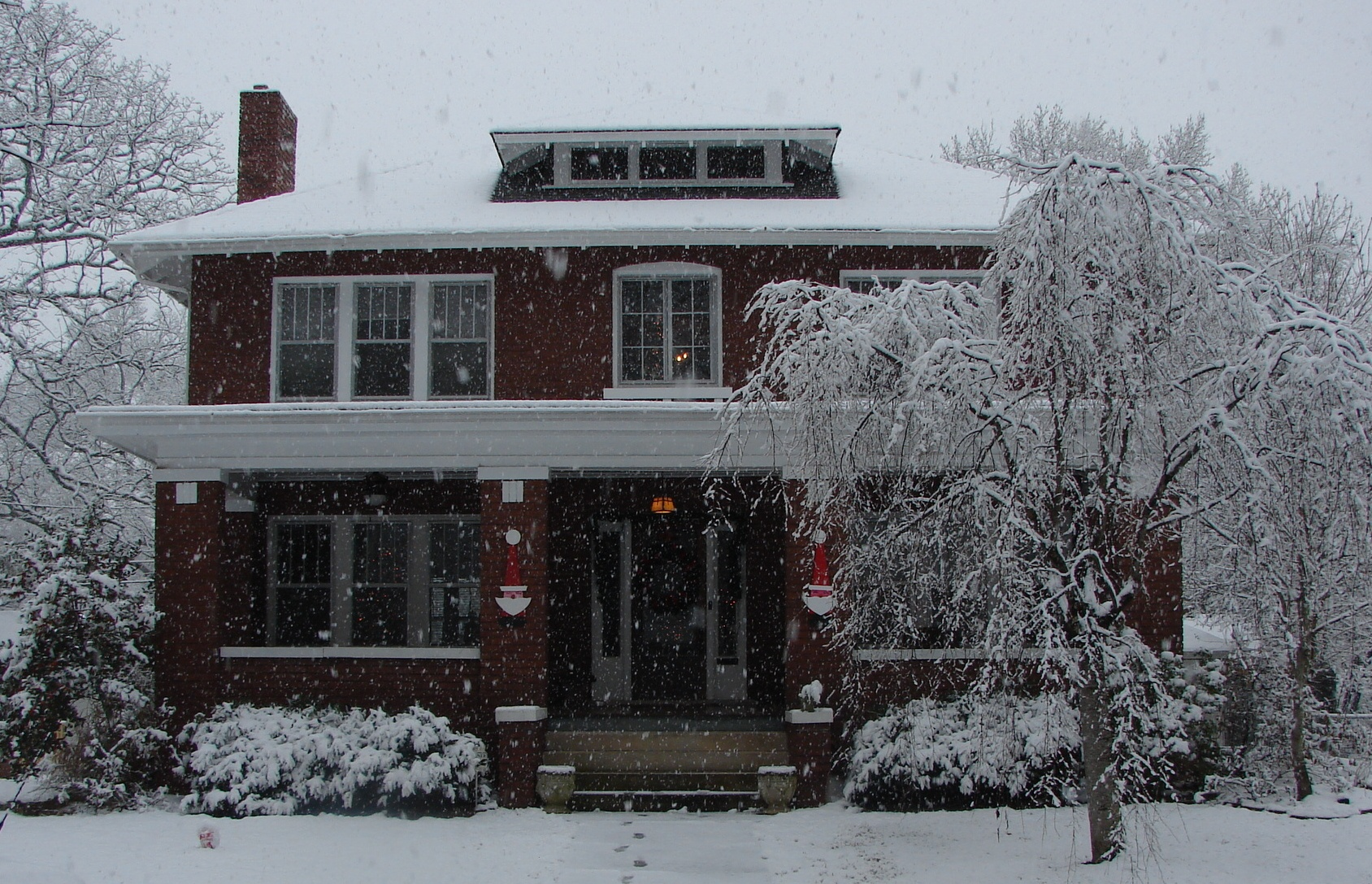
Four Square Style

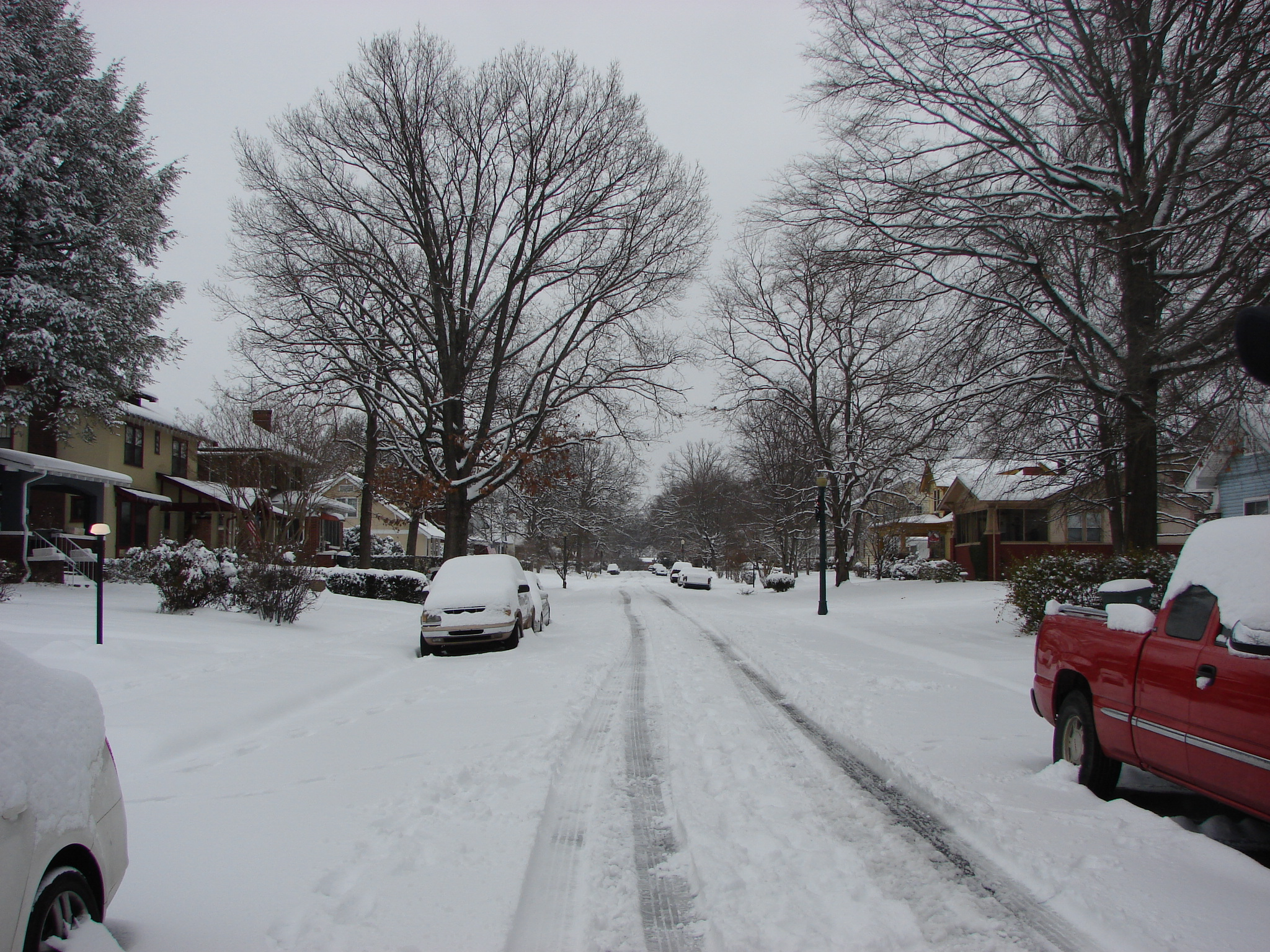

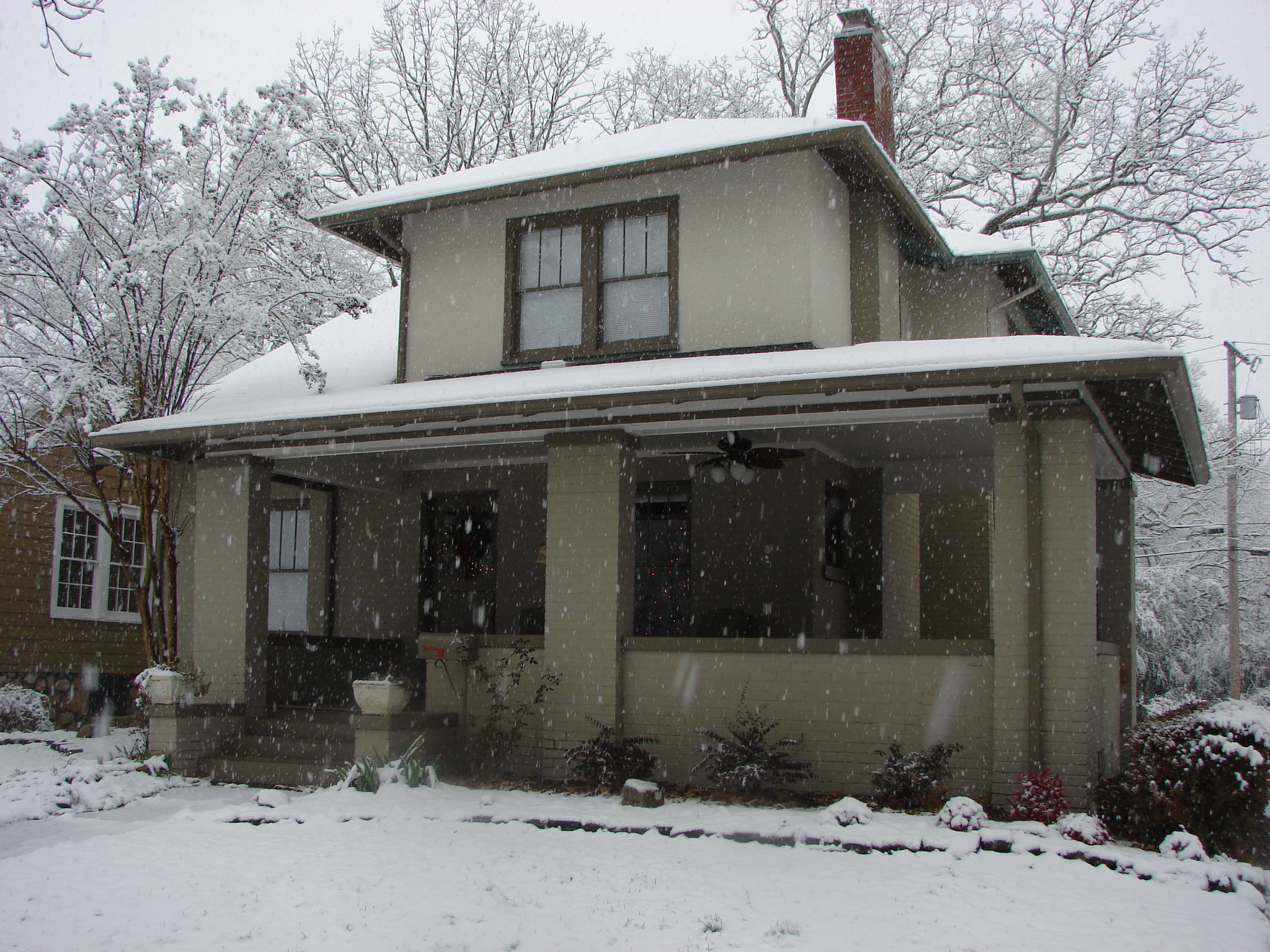

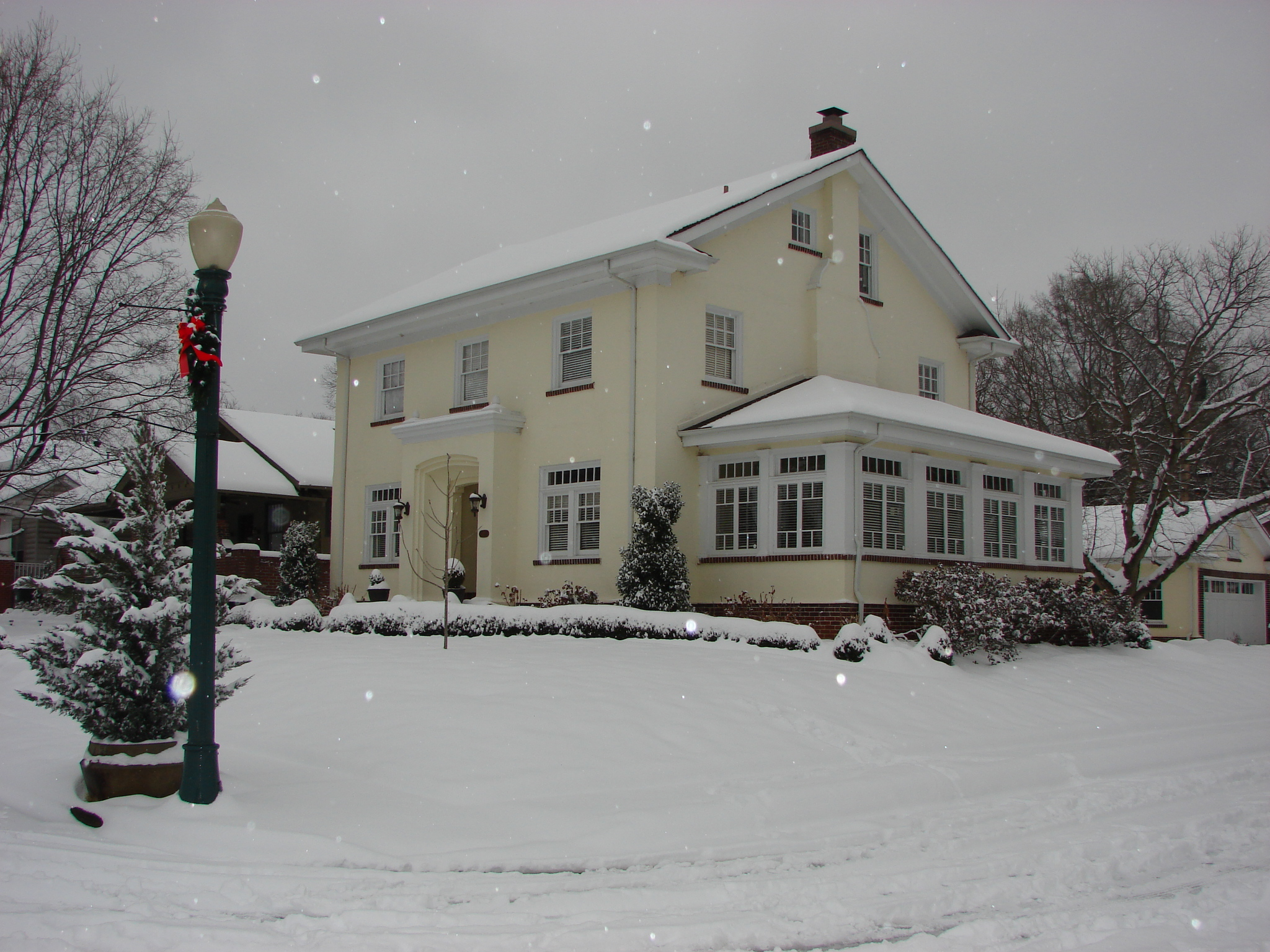
