= Warehouse Row Historic District =

Historic district in Missouri, United States

- U.S. National Register of Historic Places
- U.S. Historic district
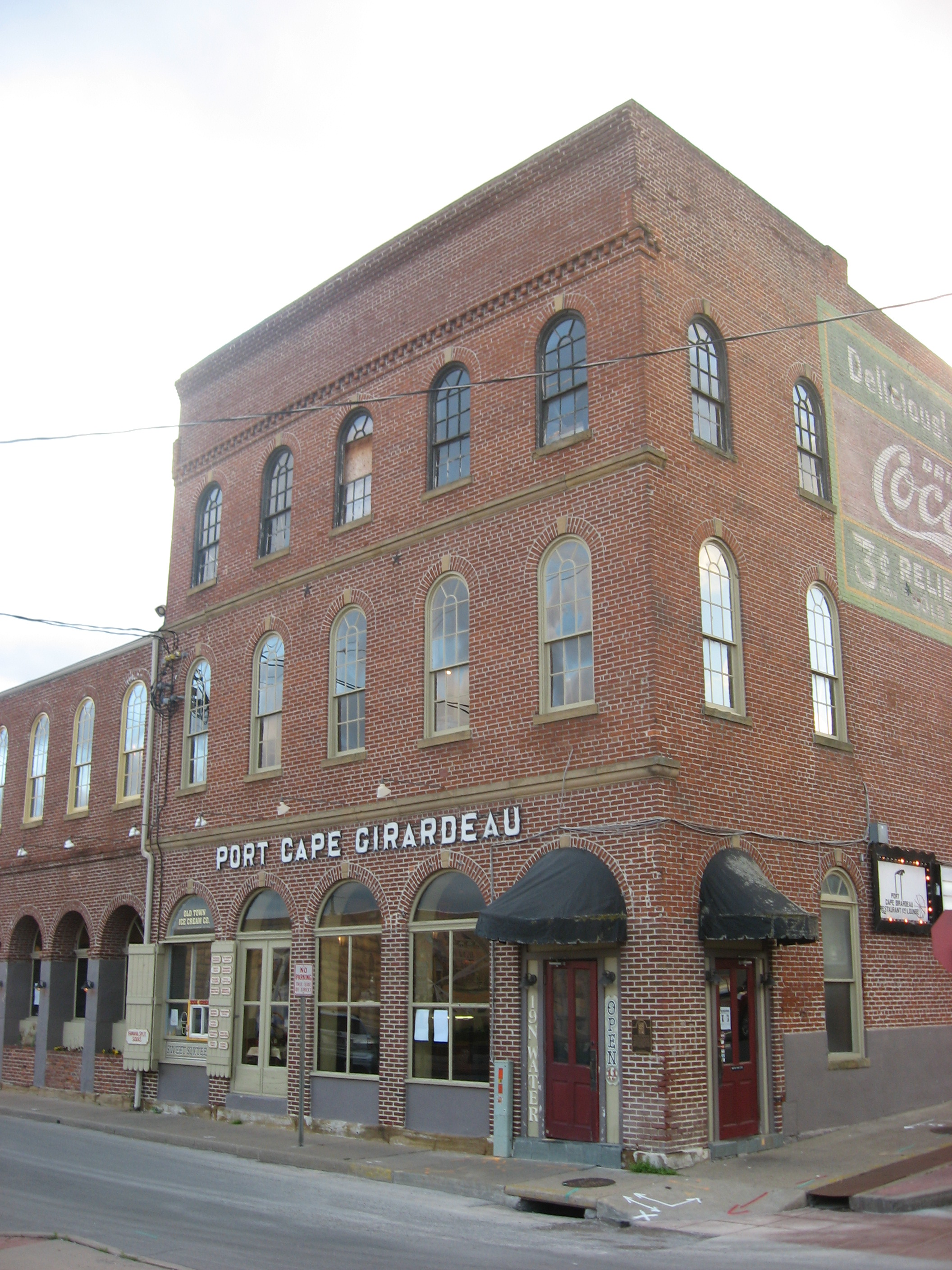
- Warehouse Row Historic District, April 2013

- Location within Missouri Location within the United States
- Location: 19 N. Water St., Cape Girardeau, Missouri
- Coordinates: 37°18′23″N 89°31′4″W
- Area: less than one acre
- Built: 1864-1874
- Architectural style: Two-part commercial block
- MPS: Cape Girardeau, Missouri MPS
- NRHP reference No.: 04001285
- Added to NRHP: December 4, 2004

Warehouse Row Historic District is a historic district located in Cape Girardeau, Cape Girardeau County, Missouri. The district encompasses three contributing buildings constructed between 1864 and 1874 along the banks of the Mississippi River in downtown Cape Girardeau. All the buildings are constructed of brick.

It was listed on the National Register of Historic Places in 2004.
