= "W" Road =

Historic road in Tennessee, US

- U.S. National Register of Historic Places
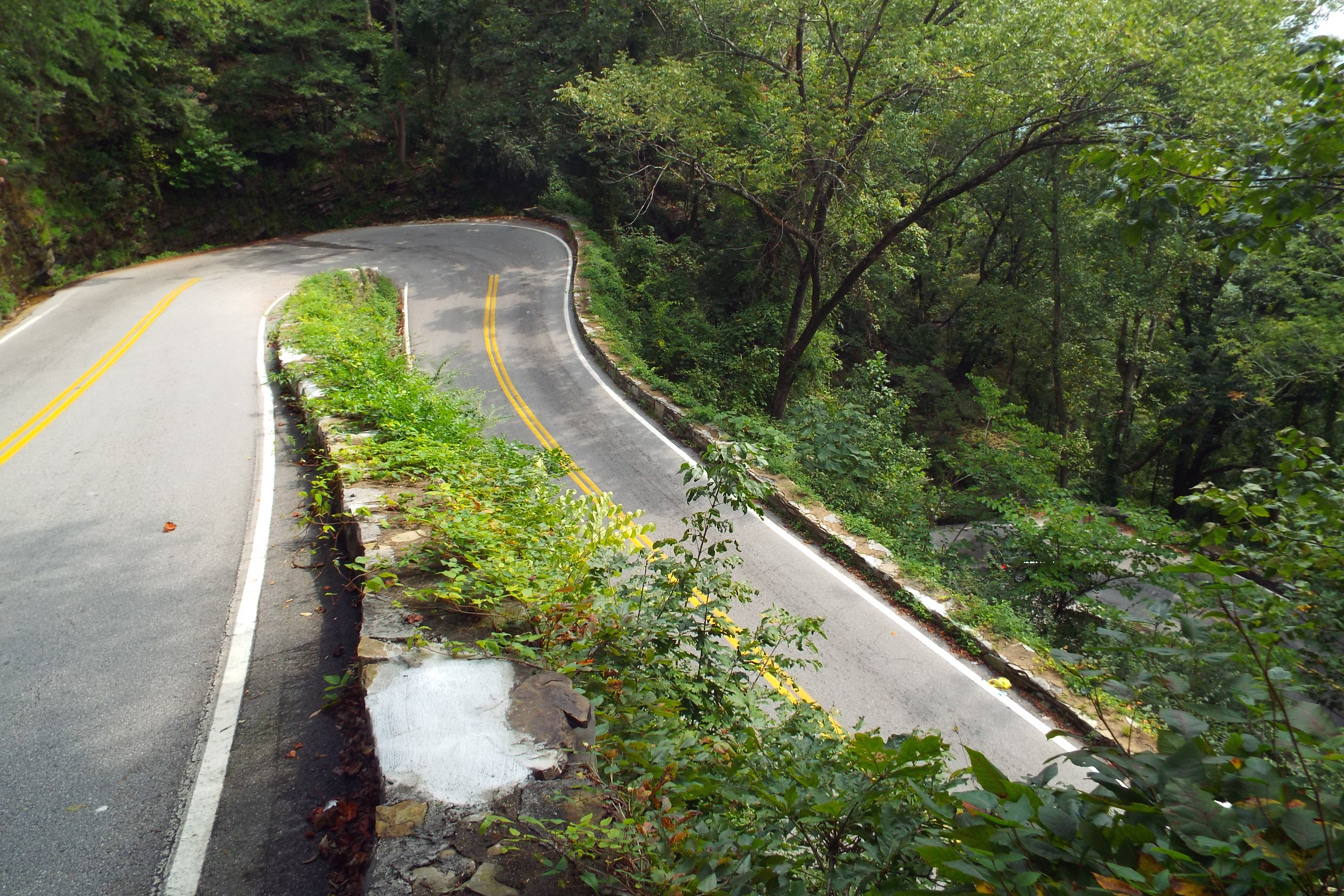
- One of the hairpins of the "W"
- Location: W Rd. from Spring St. east 0.4 miles, Walden, Tennessee
- Area: < 1 acre (0.40 ha)
- Built: 1892–93
- NRHP reference No.: 99000277
- Added to NRHP: March 19, 1999

The "W" Road is a road in Hamilton County, Tennessee, United States, that connects the city of Chattanooga with the town of Walden, located on top of Signal Mountain. The roughly 3-mile (5 km) road received its name from three hairpin turns near the road's crest on Walden Ridge that resemble a W from above.

Originally a trail used by American Indians to hunt on Walden Ridge, it was converted to a turnpike to connect farmers with Chattanooga markets. General Ulysses S. Grant traveled on the road on his way to take command of Union forces in Chattanooga during the Civil War. After the war, the turnpike became the main artery connecting Chattanooga with seasonal residences on Walden Ridge, and it was regraded and expanded into its current path in 1892–93 and paved in 1927. The "W" Road was the primary route connecting Signal Mountain with Chattanooga until the completion of Taft Highway in 1935. The "W" segment of the road is listed on the National Register of Historic Places.

== History ==
A 20th-century postcard shows the paved "W" Road.

The "W" Road began as one of a series of trails used by American Indians to hunt deer, turkey, grouse, and bear on Walden Ridge. The trail passed through Roger's Gap at the crest of the ridge. Following the Cherokee removal, white settlers began moving into the Chattanooga area. After farmers in the Sequatchie Valley sought a new route to transport goods to Chattanooga, the Tennessee General Assembly in 1840 authorized a turnpike, called Anderson Pike, to use the Roger's Gap route. The Connor Toll House was built at the crest of the road in 1858 to collect tolls.

After the Union defeat at the Battle of Chickamauga in 1863 and the Union forces' subsequent retreat to Chattanooga, Ulysses Grant—ordered by Abraham Lincoln to take command of troops in Chattanooga—traveled from the Sequatchie Valley to Chattanooga over the Anderson Pike, the only route into Chattanooga not controlled by Confederate forces. In his memoirs, Grant described the road as almost impassable due to mud and washouts; Grant's horse slipped and fell while descending the road. At that time, the road had only a single hairpin curve near the top. The turnpike near the summit was a corduroy road composed of logs.

In the 1870s, a series of yellow fever epidemics in Chattanooga drove seasonal home and hotel development on Walden Ridge as city denizens sought relief from summer humidity and disease. The Anderson Pike was the route used by these seasonal visitors. With more traffic, authorities built a new road in 1892–93 at the expense of $11,000 ($394,167 in 2025). The road was surfaced with dirt until gravel was laid down in 1911. This road included the "W" at the top for the first time. The "W" segment was rebuilt and widened in 1927. This project widened the road to 20 feet (6.1 m) and the switchbacks to 15 feet (4.6 m), paved it for the first time, installed new drains, and built new stone retaining walls on the downhill side of the road.

The William Howard Taft Highway (U.S. Route 127) was completed in 1935; the new highway provided a straighter route from Chattanooga to Walden via Signal Mountain.

== Travel ==
The road remains one of three routes connecting Walden Ridge with Chattanooga. The Taft Highway (Route 127) and Roberts Mill Road provide alternative routes when the "W" Road is closed due to winter weather, rockslides or other obstacles. Vehicles on the road are limited to 22 feet (6.7 m) in length.

== Preservation ==
The "W" segment of the road has been listed on the National Register of Historic Places since 1999.
