= Wiley United Methodist Church =

Historic church in Tennessee, United States

- U.S. National Register of Historic Places
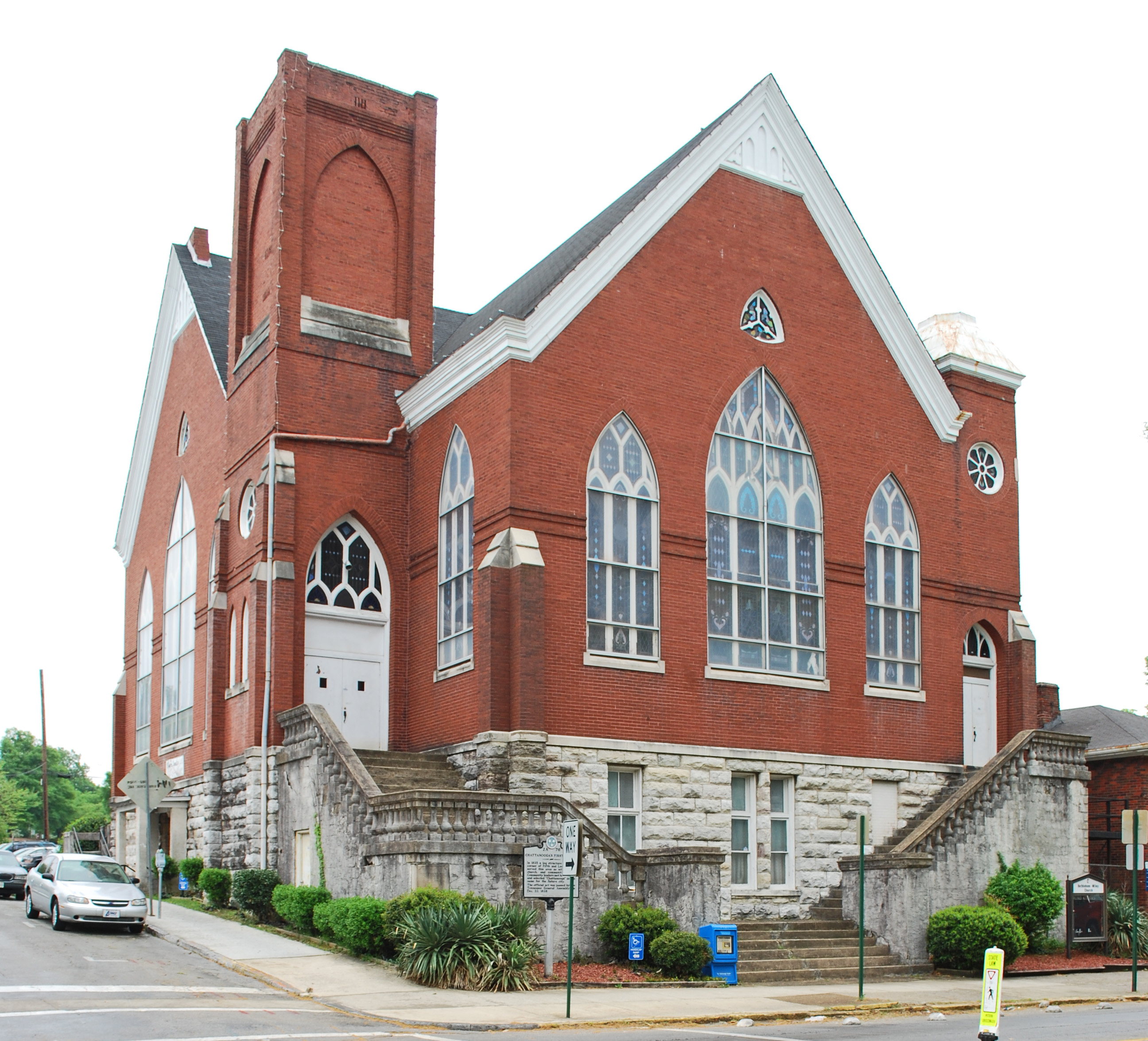

- Location within Tennessee Location within the United States
- Location: 504 Lookout St., Chattanooga, Tennessee
- Coordinates: 35°3′3″N 85°18′22″W
- Area: 0.3 acres (0.12 ha)
- Built: 1886
- Architectural style: Gothic Revival
- NRHP reference No.: 79002443
- Added to NRHP: August 01, 1979

Wiley Memorial United Methodist Church, now known as Bethlehem Wiley United Methodist Church, is a historic church at 504 Lookout Street in Chattanooga, Tennessee, affiliated with the Holston Conference of the United Methodist Church.

The church's site was an important community center in the early years of Ross's Landing, before it came to be called Chattanooga. During the American Civil War, an earlier church building on the site was used as a military hospital and prison by the Confederate Army and later as a Union Army military prison. The building incurred major damage during the 1863 Battle of Chattanooga. In 1867 it was purchased for use by the first African Methodist Episcopal congregation in East Tennessee.

The church's current brick building, completed in 1886–1887, replaced a building that was destroyed by arson. It was rebuilt though the cooperative efforts of the congregation's members.

The city declared the building unsafe for occupancy in 1978. Money was raised to restore the historic building. Following restoration, which included installation of a new roof, sandblasting the exterior, and uncovering some of the interior woodwork, the building was added to the National Register of Historic Places. After the 1979 National Register listing, city officials allowed the congregation to resume its use of the church for worship.
