= Waccamaw River Warehouse Historic District =

Historic district in South Carolina, United States

- U.S. National Register of Historic Places
- U.S. Historic district
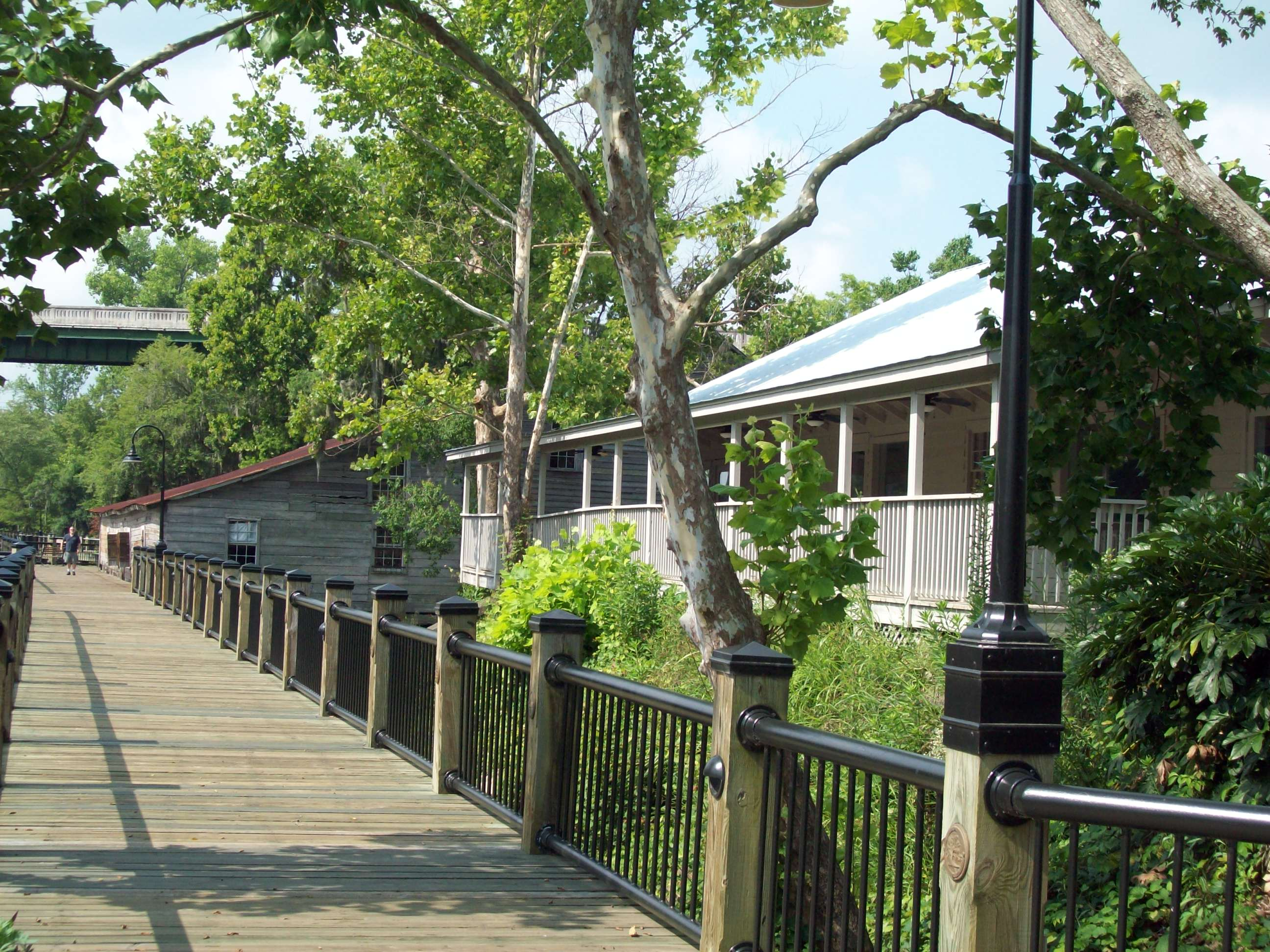
- Waccamaw River Warehouse Historic District (Steamer Terminal on left; Warehouse on right), June 2010

- Location within South Carolina Location within the United States
- Location: Roughly Main St. between the Waccamaw River and Laurel St., Conway, South Carolina
- Coordinates: 33°50′0″N 79°2′42″W
- Area: 2.5 acres (1.0 ha)
- Built: 1880
- MPS: Conway MRA
- NRHP reference No.: 86002269
- Added to NRHP: August 05, 1986

Waccamaw River Warehouse Historic District is a national historic district located at Conway in Horry County, South Carolina. It includes three contributing buildings: a steamer terminal (ca. 1880), warehouse (ca. 1890), and tobacco warehouse (ca. 1900). These buildings illustrate the evolution of utilitarian structures at the end of the 19th century, documenting the shift from heavy-timber braced-frame structural members to smaller-member, balloon framing with multiple diagonal bracing and the use of a clerestory for additional light. They are the last extant warehouses in Conway associated with the commercial trade on the Waccamaw River.

It was listed on the National Register of Historic Places in 1986.

== Gallery ==
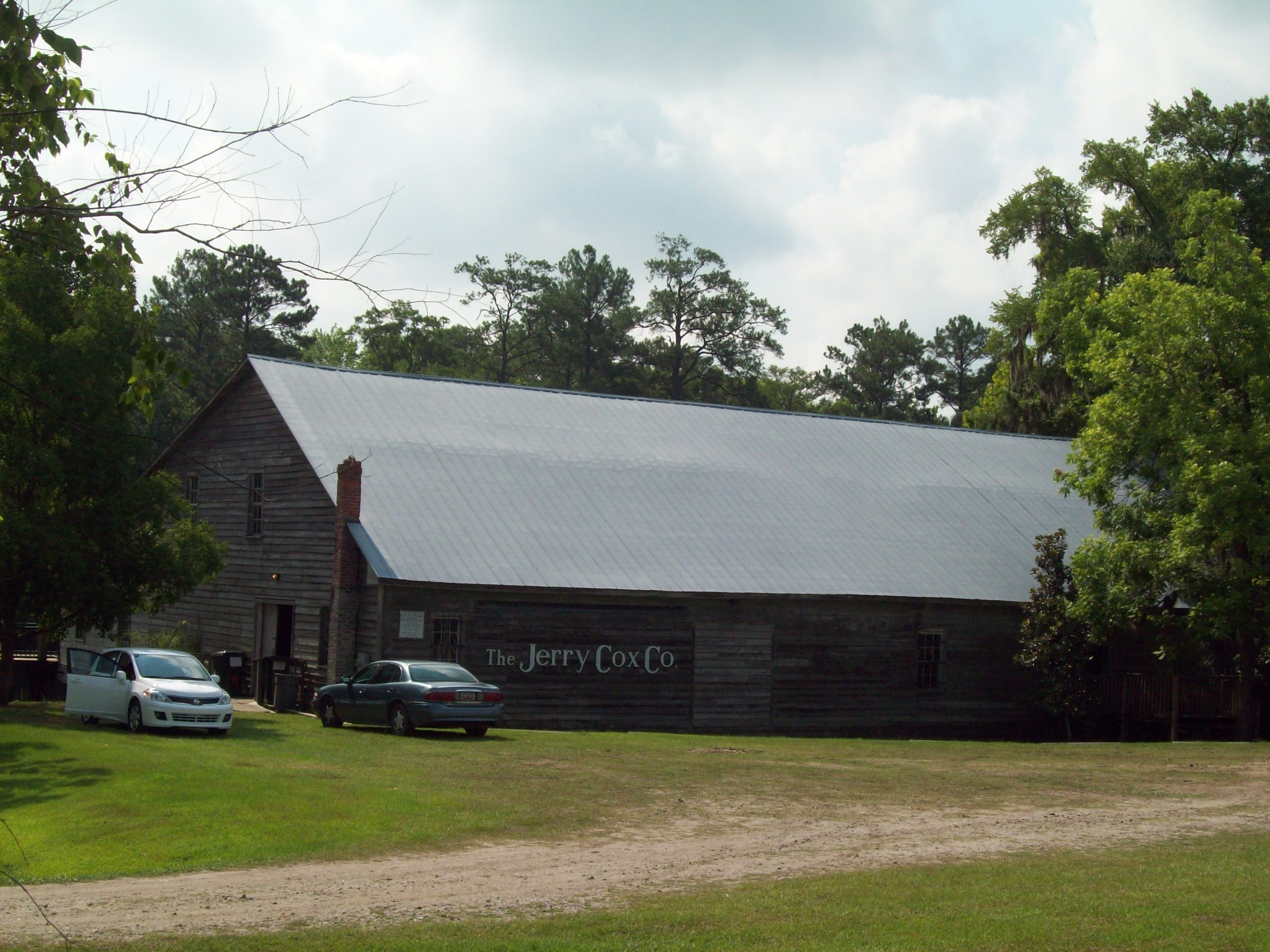
Steamer Terminal, June 2010

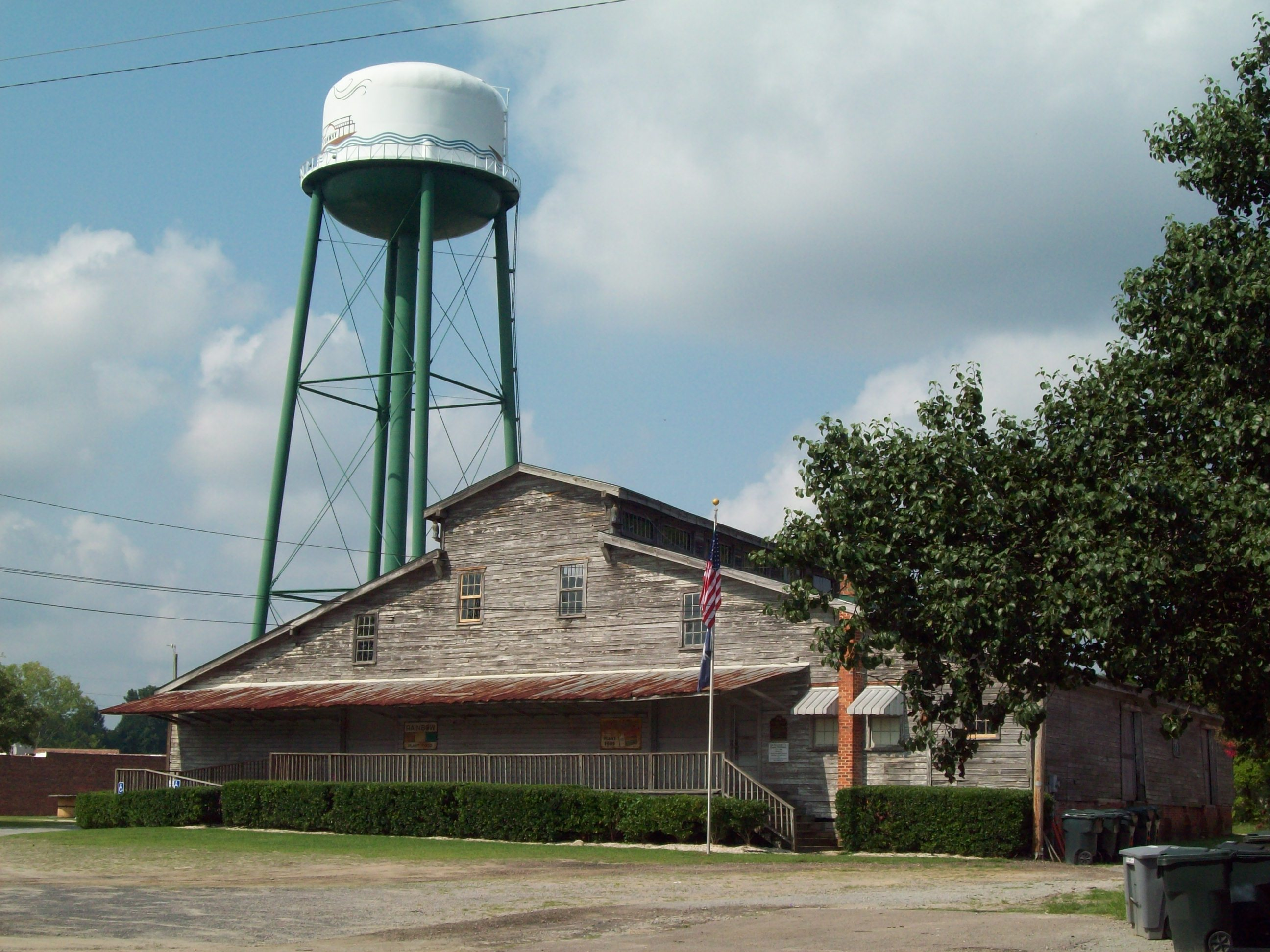
Tobacco Warehouse, June 2010

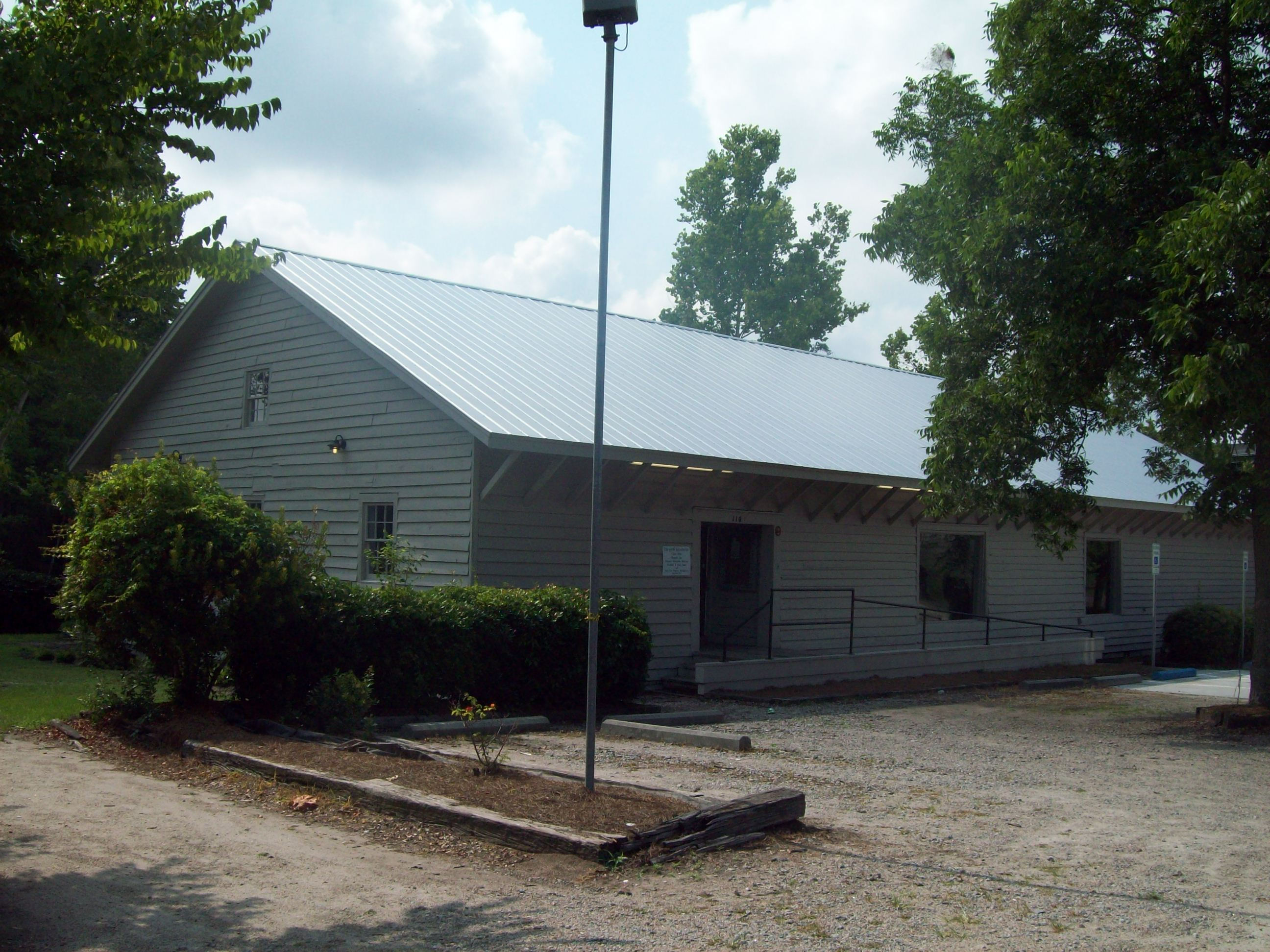
Warehouse, June 2010
