= Springfield Warehouse and Industrial Historic District =

Historic district in Missouri, United States

- U.S. National Register of Historic Places
- U.S. Historic district
- Location within Missouri Location within the United States
- Location: E. Water, W. Mill and W. Phelps Sts. and Boonville Ave., Springfield, Missouri
- Coordinates: 37°12′23″N 93°17′30″W
- Area: 6.8 acres (2.8 ha)
- Built: 1891
- Architectural style: Italianate, Romanesque, et al.
- MPS: Springfield MPS
- NRHP reference No.: 99000715
- Added to NRHP: June 25, 1999

Springfield Warehouse and Industrial Historic District is a national historic district located in Springfield, Missouri, United States. It encompasses 16 contributing buildings and 1 contributing structure in a commercial / industrial section of Springfield. Developed between about 1891 and 1948, the district also includes representative examples of Italianate and Romanesque Revival style architecture. Notable buildings include the Springfield Ice and Refrigerator Company (1914, 1927), Armour Creamery Boiler House (c. 1900), Andrew Rebori Company (c. 1900), Crighton Provision Company (c. 1900), and Armour Creamery Cold Storage Warehouse (c. 1910).

It was added to the National Register of Historic Places in 1999.
