= Sequatchie County, Tennessee =

County in Tennessee, United States

- County
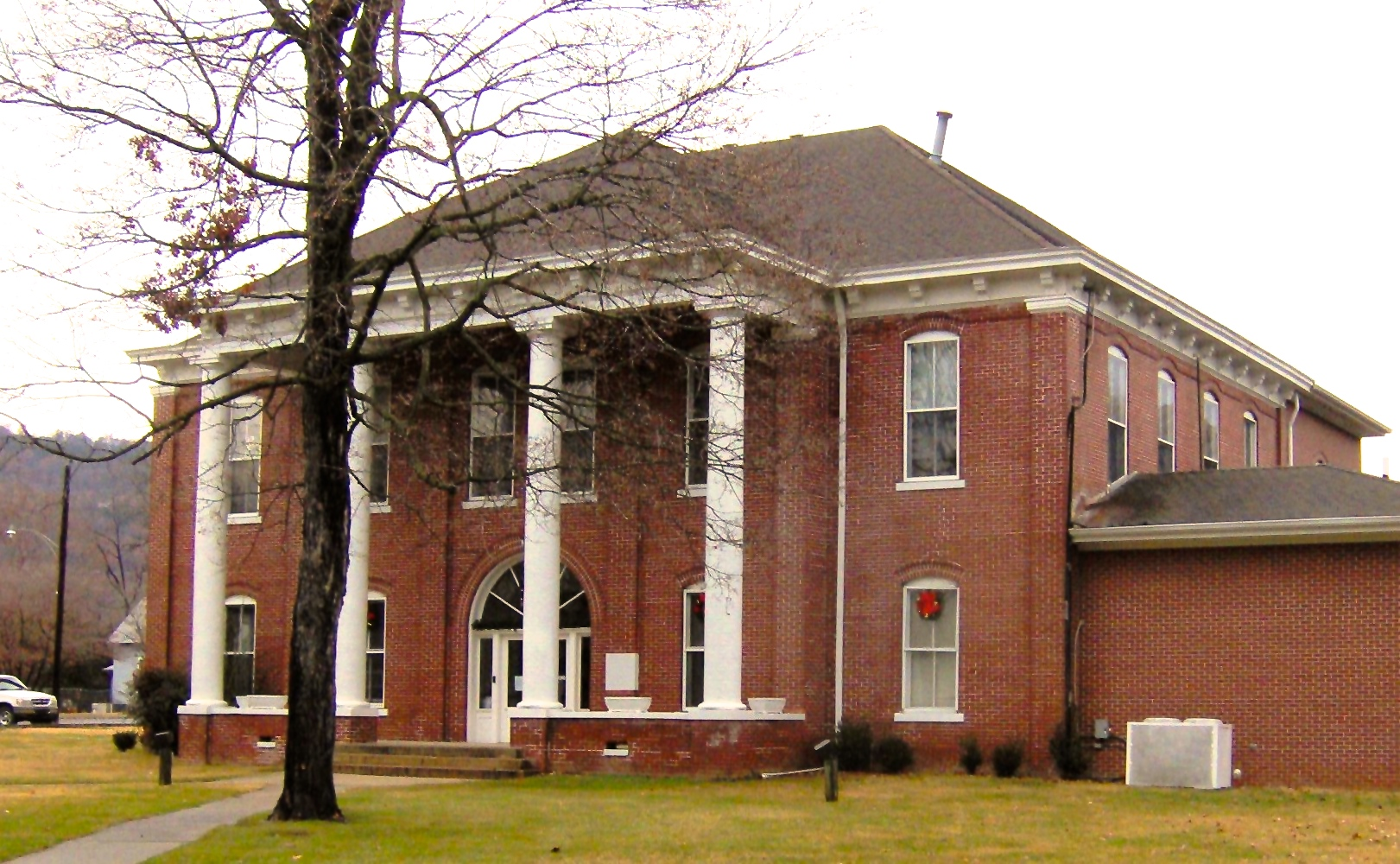
- Sequatchie County Courthouse in Dunlap

- Location within the U.S. state of Tennessee
- Coordinates: 35°22′N 85°25′W
- Country: United States
- State: Tennessee
- Founded: December 9, 1857
- Named for: Cherokee chief
- Seat: Dunlap
- Largest city: Dunlap

Area
  - Total: 266 sq mi (690 km^{2})
  - Land: 266 sq mi (690 km^{2})
  - Water: 0.2 sq mi (0.52 km^{2}) 0.07%

Population (2020)
  - Total: 15,826
  - Estimate (2025): 17,861 ▲
  - Density: 53/sq mi (20/km^{2})
- Time zone: UTC−6 (Central)
  - Summer (DST): UTC−5 (CDT)
- Congressional district: 4th
- Website: sequatchiecountytn.gov

Sequatchie County is a county located in the U.S. state of Tennessee. As of the 2020 census, the population was 15,826. Its county seat is Dunlap. Sequatchie County is part of the Chattanooga metropolitan area.

== History ==
Sequatchie County was created in 1857 from two districts of Marion County and one district of Bledsoe County. It was named for the Sequatchie Valley, which in turn had been named for a Cherokee chief. The word sequachee from ᏏᏆ ᎤᏤᏥᏍᏘ siqua utsedsdi in Cherokee means 'opossum' or 'he grins.' Settlers began arriving in what is now Sequatchie by the early 19th century, drawn to the area by the fertile land in the valley.

At the outset of the Civil War, Sequatchie was divided over the issue of secession. On June 8, 1861, Sequatchie Countians voted in favor of Tennessee's Ordinance of Secession by a vote 153 to 100. In October 1863, Confederate General Joseph Wheeler led a raid into Sequatchie, burning nearly a thousand wagons and capturing livestock.

During the late 19th century, the Douglas Coal and Coke Company (later the Chattanooga Iron and Coal Corporation) conducted extensive mining activities in the Dunlap area. The company constructed 268 beehive ovens, now known as the Dunlap Coke Ovens, to convert coal into coke. The ovens are now the focus of a local park.

== Geography ==
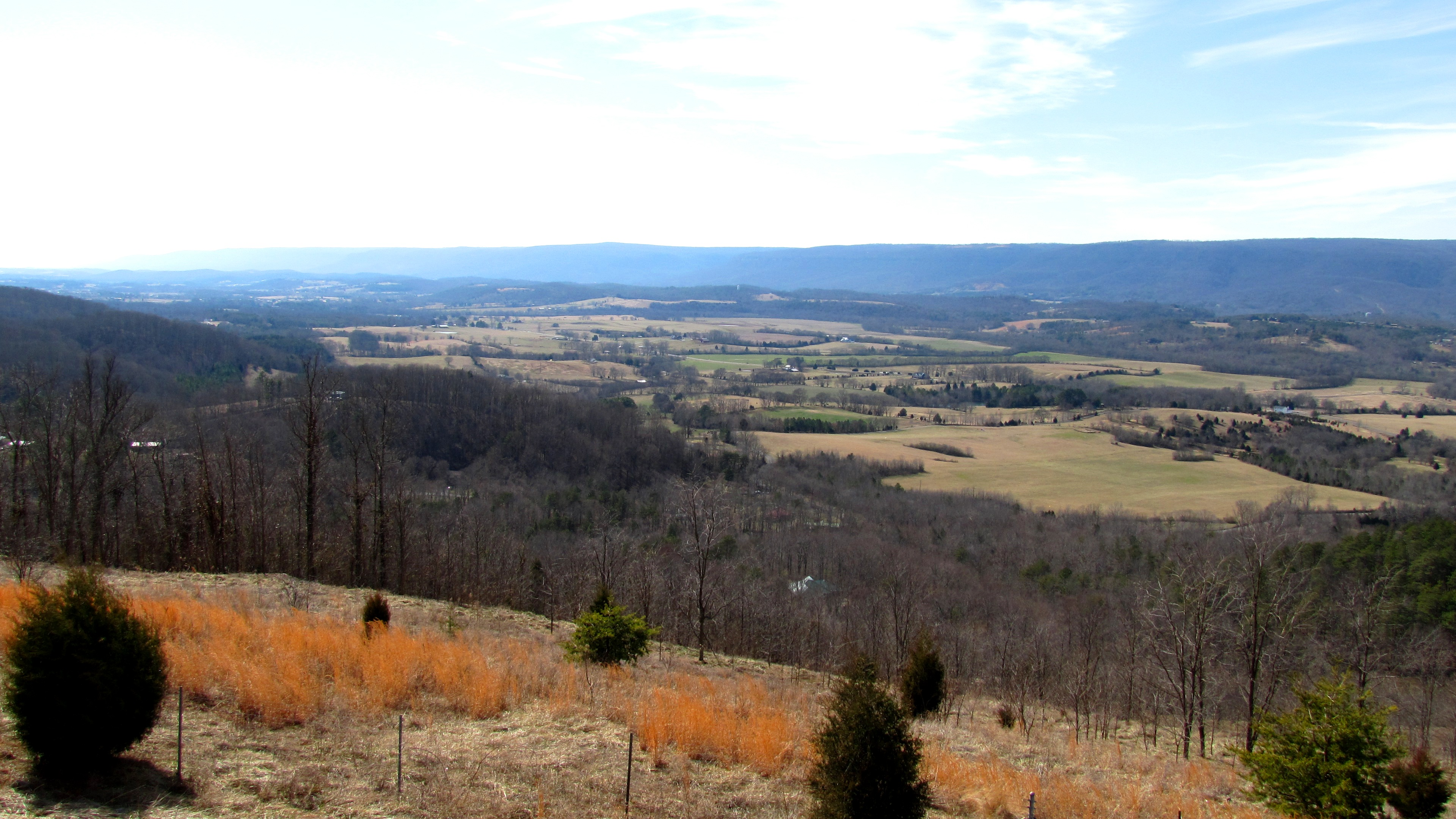
View over Sequatchie County from an overlook off TN-111

According to the U.S. Census Bureau, the county has a total area of 266 square miles (690 km^{2}), of which 266 square miles (690 km^{2}) is land and 0.2 square miles (0.52 km^{2}) (0.07%) is water.

Sequatchie is one of three counties (along with Bledsoe and Marion) situated in the Sequatchie Valley, a long, narrow valley running northeast-to-southwest across the eastern portion of the Cumberland Plateau. The county is flanked by the Plateau's Walden Ridge escarpment on the east. The Sequatchie River, which spans the valley, passes through the county.

Two major highways, U.S. Route 127 and Tennessee State Route 111, intersect in Dunlap.

While the two other counties in the Sequatchie Valley, Bledsoe and Marion, are grouped with the East Tennessee grand division, Sequatchie is grouped with Middle Tennessee.

=== Adjacent counties ===
- Van Buren County (north)
- Bledsoe County (northeast)
- Hamilton County (southeast/EST Border)
- Marion County (southwest)
- Grundy County (west)
- Warren County (northwest)

=== State protected areas ===
- Justin P. Wilson Cumberland Trail State Park (part)
- North Chickamauga Creek Gorge State Park (part)
- Prentice Cooper State Forest (part)
- Savage Gulf State Park (part)

== Demographics ==
Historical population
Census	Pop.	Note	%±
1860	2,120		—
1870	2,335		10.1%
1880	2,565		9.9%
1890	3,027		18.0%
1900	3,326		9.9%
1910	4,202		26.3%
1920	3,632		−13.6%
1930	4,047		11.4%
1940	5,038		24.5%
1950	5,685		12.8%
1960	5,915		4.0%
1970	6,331		7.0%
1980	8,605		35.9%
1990	8,863		3.0%
2000	11,370		28.3%
2010	14,112		24.1%
2020	15,826		12.1%
2025 (est.)	17,861	▲	12.9%
U.S. Decennial Census; 1790-1960 1900-1990; 1990-2000 2010-2014 Its county seat is Dunlap.

=== Racial and ethnic composition ===
Sequatchie County, Tennessee – Racial and ethnic composition Note: the US Census treats Hispanic/Latino as an ethnic category. This table excludes Latinos from the racial categories and assigns them to a separate category. Hispanics/Latinos may be of any race.
Race / Ethnicity (NH = Non-Hispanic)	Pop 1980	Pop 1990	Pop 2000	Pop 2010	Pop 2020	% 1980	% 1990	% 2000	% 2010	% 2020
White alone (NH)	8,513	8,827	11,143	13,402	14,409	98.93%	99.59%	98.00%	94.97%	91.05%
Black or African American alone (NH)	18	2	19	19	72	0.21%	0.02%	0.17%	0.13%	0.45%
Native American or Alaska Native alone (NH)	17	4	38	47	49	0.20%	0.05%	0.33%	0.33%	0.31%
Asian alone (NH)	6	5	15	40	65	0.07%	0.06%	0.13%	0.28%	0.41%
Native Hawaiian or Pacific Islander alone (NH)	x	x	2	4	4	x	x	0.02%	0.03%	0.03%
Other race alone (NH)	12	0	6	4	42	0.14%	0.00%	0.05%	0.03%	0.27%
Mixed race or Multiracial (NH)	x	x	54	134	564	x	x	0.47%	0.95%	3.56%
Hispanic or Latino (any race)	39	25	93	462	621	0.45%	0.28%	0.82%	3.27%	3.92%
Total	8,605	8,863	11,370	14,112	15,826	100.00%	100.00%	100.00%	100.00%	100.00%

=== 2020 census ===
As of the 2020 census, there were 15,826 people living in 6,190 households, including 4,192 families, and the median age was 44.3 years. 21.0% of residents were under the age of 18 and 21.1% of residents were 65 years of age or older. For every 100 females there were 99.6 males, and for every 100 females age 18 and over there were 98.7 males age 18 and over.

The racial makeup of the county was 92.2% White, 0.5% Black or African American, 0.6% American Indian and Alaska Native, 0.4% Asian, <0.1% Native Hawaiian and Pacific Islander, 2.0% from some other race, and 4.4% from two or more races. Hispanic or Latino residents of any race comprised 3.9% of the population.

<0.1% of residents lived in urban areas, while 100.0% lived in rural areas.

Of the 6,190 households in the county, 29.4% had children under the age of 18 living in them; 50.7% were married-couple households, 17.6% were households with a male householder and no spouse or partner present, and 24.6% were households with a female householder and no spouse or partner present. About 24.7% of all households were made up of individuals and 12.4% had someone living alone who was 65 years of age or older.

There were 6,925 housing units, of which 10.6% were vacant. Among occupied housing units, 74.7% were owner-occupied and 25.3% were renter-occupied. The homeowner vacancy rate was 1.5% and the rental vacancy rate was 6.2%.

=== 2010 census ===
As of the census of 2010, there were 14,112 people, 4,463 households, and 3,311 families residing in the county. The population density was 43 inhabitants per square mile (17/km^{2}). There were 4,916 housing units at an average density of 18 units per square mile (6.9/km^{2}). The racial makeup of the county was 98.66% White, 0.19% Black or African American, 0.33% Native American, 0.13% Asian, 0.03% Pacific Islander, 0.17% from other races, and 0.48% from two or more races. 0.82% of the population were Hispanic or Latino of any race. Sequatchie County was mentioned as an "Extreme Whitopia" in Rich Benjamin's book, Searching for Whitopia.

There were 4,463 households, out of which 33.00% had children under the age of 18 living with them, 58.80% were married couples living together, 11.20% had a female householder with no husband present, and 25.80% were non-families. 22.40% of all households were made up of individuals, and 8.80% had someone living alone who was 65 years of age or older. The average household size was 2.52 and the average family size was 2.92.

In the county, the population was spread out, with 24.60% under the age of 18, 8.40% from 18 to 24, 30.00% from 25 to 44, 24.80% from 45 to 64, and 12.30% who were 65 years of age or older. The median age was 37 years. For every 100 females there were 98.30 males. For every 100 females age 18 and over, there were 95.80 males.

The median income for a household in the county was $30,959, and the median income for a family was $36,435. Males had a median income of $27,535 versus $20,422 for females. The per capita income for the county was $16,468. About 13.50% of families and 16.50% of the population were below the poverty line, including 21.50% of those under age 18 and 20.30% of those age 65 or over.

== Education ==
Sequatchie County has a consolidated school system which is located in Dunlap. The system operates with a superintendent and an elected school board.

The Sequatchie County school system has three schools:

- Griffith Elementary School (grades: K–4th)
- Sequatchie County Middle School (grades: 5th–8th)
- Sequatchie County High School (grades: 9th–12th)

== Recreation ==
Sequatchie County is known as "The Hang Gliding Capital of the East", due in part to the presence of an active hang gliding association, the Tennessee Tree Toppers. This group maintains a hang gliding ramp at Henson's Gap, along the eastern wall of the Sequatchie Valley, where favorable flying conditions allow these unpowered aircraft to fly well into northwestern Georgia and northeastern Alabama after launch. The gap is the site of numerous hang gliding competitions, and is a popular tourist attraction for aficionados of the sport from all over the world.

== Communities ==
=== City ===
- Dunlap (county seat)

=== Census-designated place ===
- Lone Oak

=== Unincorporated communities ===
- Brush Creek
- Cagle
- Lewis Chapel

== Media ==
Sequatchie County is served by numerous local, regional and national media outlets which reach approximately one million people in four states including: Tennessee, Alabama, Georgia and North Carolina.

=== Newspapers ===
- The Dunlap Tribune: The periodical focuses its energy on highlighting events, sports and people in Dunlap, TN and Sequatchie County.

=== Radio ===
Sequatchie County is part of the Chattanooga Arbitron radio market. The following radio stations are licensed to cities within Sequatchie County:

AM

- WSDQ 1190 AM – Country (Licensed to Dunlap)

FM

- W227DM 93.3 - Country Roads 93.3 WSDQ (FM translator for WSDQ-AM Licensed to Dunlap)

== Notable people ==
- Phil Douglas (1890-1952), Major League Baseball player best known for playing with the 1921 World Series winning New York Giants.
- Dakota Hudson (1994–present), professional baseball player for St. Louis Cardinals
- James Standifer (1779-1837), U.S. congressman
- William Stone (1791-1853), U.S. congressman

== Politics ==
United States presidential election results for Sequatchie County, Tennessee
Year	Republican		Democratic		Third party(ies)	
Year	No.	%	No.	%	No.	%
1912	139	22.60%	354	57.56%	122	19.84%
1916	238	41.11%	335	57.86%	6	1.04%
1920	509	48.16%	545	51.56%	3	0.28%
1924	247	39.46%	374	59.74%	5	0.80%
1928	298	43.76%	383	56.24%	0	0.00%
1932	289	26.86%	777	72.21%	10	0.93%
1936	353	29.47%	840	70.12%	5	0.42%
1940	401	28.48%	1,003	71.24%	4	0.28%
1944	417	32.89%	851	67.11%	0	0.00%
1948	420	30.59%	907	66.06%	46	3.35%
1952	535	37.57%	882	61.94%	7	0.49%
1956	683	43.89%	859	55.21%	14	0.90%
1960	703	42.48%	930	56.19%	22	1.33%
1964	804	40.90%	1,162	59.10%	0	0.00%
1968	663	29.82%	549	24.70%	1,011	45.48%
1972	1,298	64.58%	629	31.29%	83	4.13%
1976	1,065	37.47%	1,733	60.98%	44	1.55%
1980	1,512	49.54%	1,509	49.44%	31	1.02%
1984	1,785	58.68%	1,238	40.70%	19	0.62%
1988	1,659	57.83%	1,196	41.69%	14	0.49%
1992	1,381	38.80%	1,754	49.28%	424	11.91%
1996	1,391	42.18%	1,598	48.45%	309	9.37%
2000	2,169	55.80%	1,648	42.40%	70	1.80%
2004	2,951	59.22%	1,986	39.86%	46	0.92%
2008	3,610	66.40%	1,717	31.58%	110	2.02%
2012	3,541	68.72%	1,489	28.90%	123	2.39%
2016	4,441	77.99%	1,053	18.49%	200	3.51%
2020	5,855	80.74%	1,298	17.90%	99	1.37%
2024	6,522	82.66%	1,292	16.38%	76	0.96%

== See also ==
- National Register of Historic Places listings in Sequatchie County, Tennessee
