= Lewis Chapel, Tennessee =

- Unincorporated community
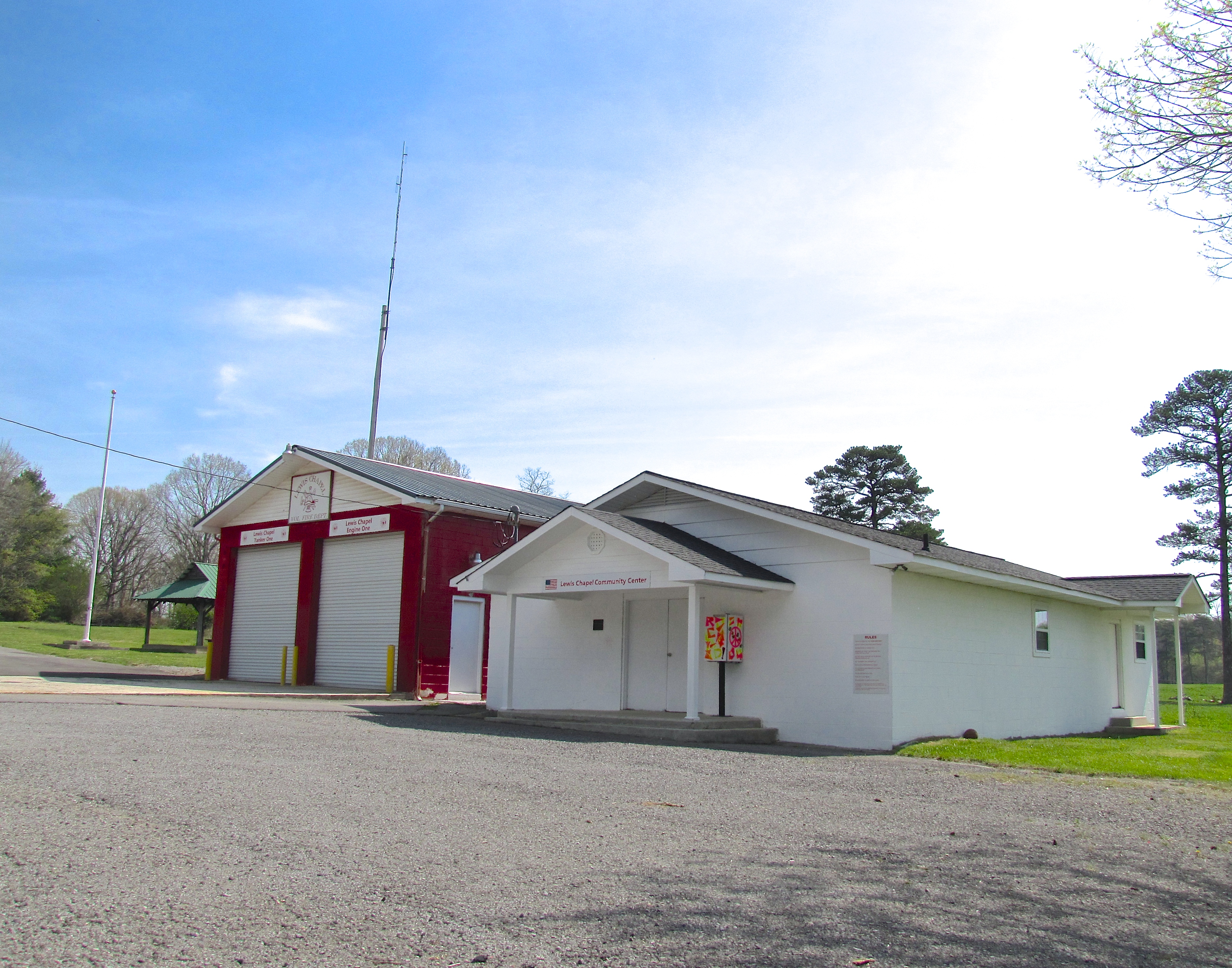
- Lewis Chapel Volunteer Fire Department (left) and Lewis Chapel Community Center
- Nickname: Lewis Chapel Mountain
- Location within Tennessee Location within the United States
- Coordinates: 35°20′27″N 85°18′27″W
- Country: United States
- State: Tennessee
- County: Sequatchie
- Elevation: 1,818 ft (554 m)
- Time zone: UTC-6 (Central (CST))
  - Summer (DST): UTC-5 (CDT)
- ZIP codes: 37327, 37338
- Area code: 423
- GNIS feature ID: 1291078

Lewis Chapel is an unincorporated community in Sequatchie County, Tennessee, United States. It is located in the eastern part of the county atop the Waldens Ridge. Tennessee State Route 111 connects the community to Dunlap in the Sequatchie Valley to the west and Soddy-Daisy and the outskirts of Chattanooga in the Tennessee Valley to the east.

Lewis Chapel was probably named for the Reverend Edgar R. Lewis, an early minister in the area.
