= Dunlap coke ovens =

- U.S. National Register of Historic Places
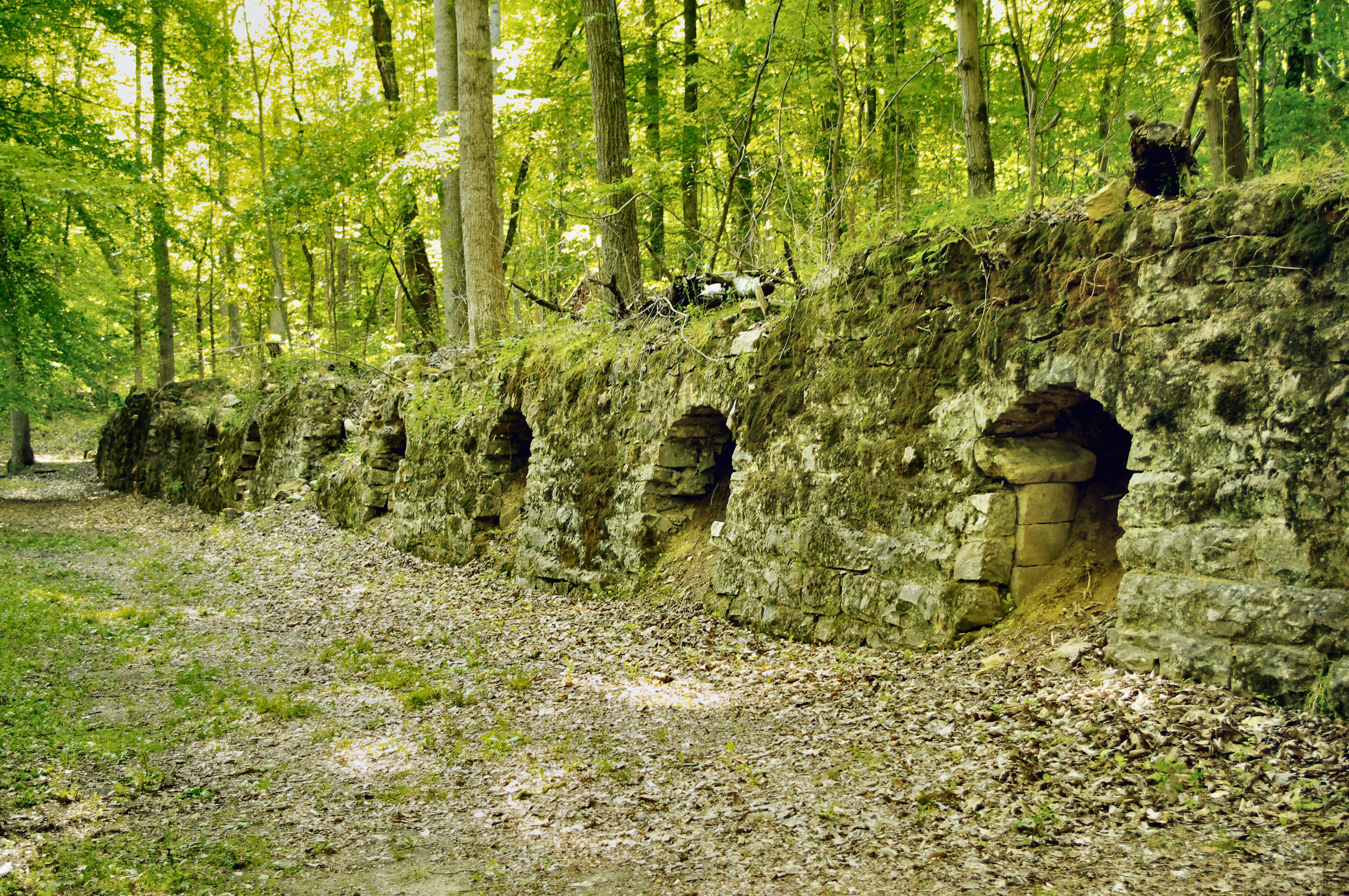
- Location: Hickory Street and Cordell Road in Dunlap, Tennessee
- Coordinates: 35°22′47″N 85°24′6″W
- Area: 6 acres (2.4 ha)
- Built: 1902, 1906, 1916
- NRHP reference No.: 85001489
- Added to NRHP: 1985

The Dunlap coke ovens are the remnants of a coke production facility in Dunlap, in the U.S. state of Tennessee. Built in the early 1900s, the facility consists of five batteries of 268 beehive ovens, which operated under various companies until the early 1920s. The ovens are now listed on the National Register of Historic Places, and are maintained by the Sequatchie Valley Historical Society as part of Dunlap Coke Ovens Park.

The rise of the steel industry during the Industrial Revolution brought about an exponential increase in the demand for coke, a fuel derived from the carbonization of coal that was used primarily in the production of pig iron. The Dunlap coke facility, which converted coal mined atop Fredonia Mountain into coke for use in blast furnaces in nearby Chattanooga, brought drastic change and modernization to Dunlap and the central Sequatchie Valley, the economy of which had long been based on subsistence agriculture. While the ovens themselves are all that remain from Dunlap's coke production operations, the Sequatchie Valley Historical Society has redeveloped the coke ovens area into a substantial public park and museum.

== Location ==
The Sequatchie Valley is a long, narrow anticline valley carved into the southern section of the Cumberland Plateau. Dunlap, the county seat of Sequatchie County, is located near the center of the valley. The relatively steep walls of the Plateau rise roughly 1,000 feet (300 m) above the valley floor, which is traversed by the Sequatchie River. Fredonia Mountain, a section of the western valley wall, rises steeply a few miles west of Dunlap. The Dunlap Coke Ovens are situated at the base of Fredonia Mountain, along a stream known as Coops Creek. The ovens and surrounding park are located on Mountain View Road, just under a mile west of downtown Dunlap.

== The Dunlap ovens and the coking process ==
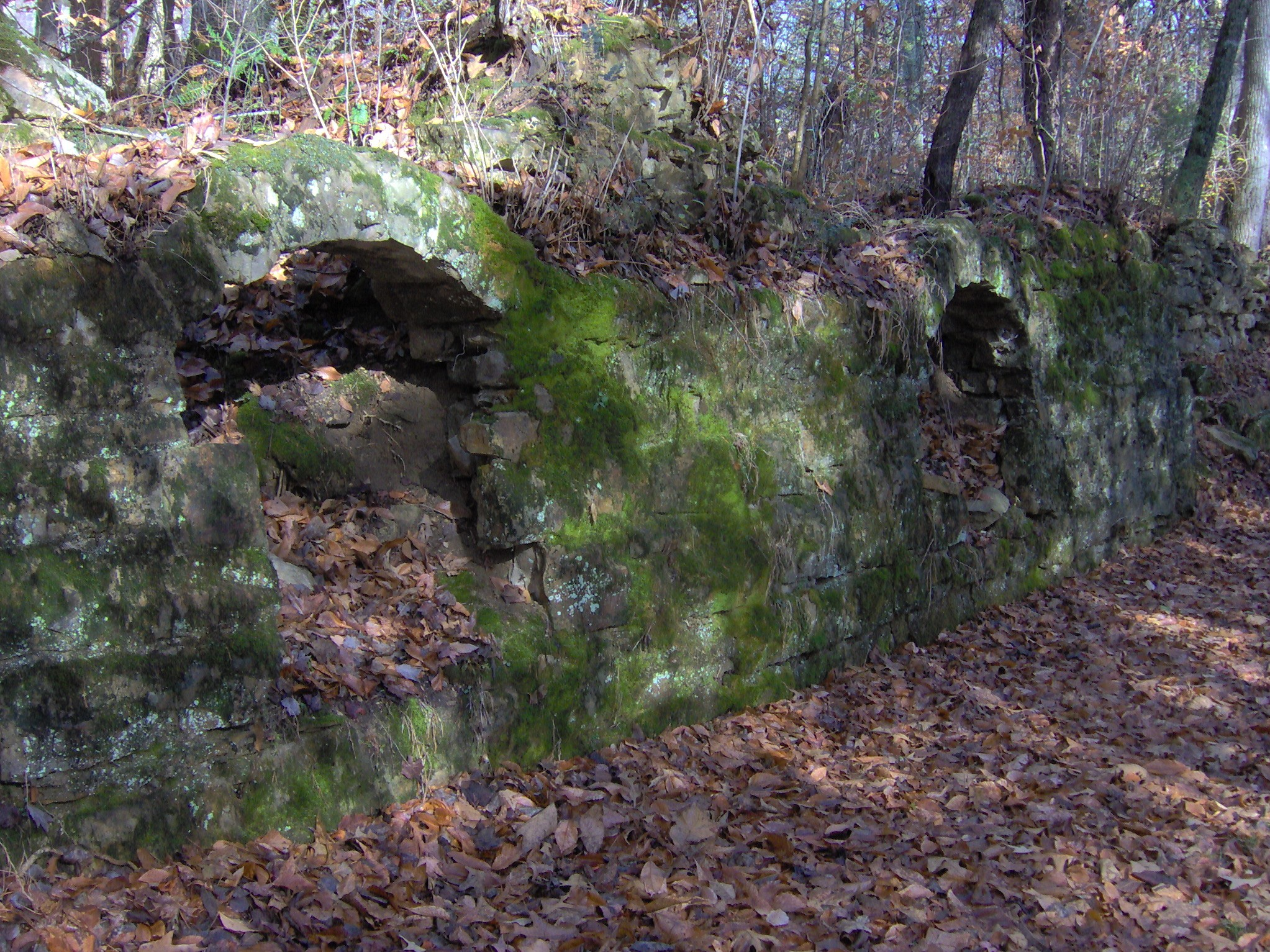
Sandstone facing of two ovens

The Dunlap coke ovens facility consists of five batteries— four "double" batteries of ovens built back-to-back in staggered formation, and one "single" battery of ovens resting against an embankment. The batteries are all approximately 9 feet (2.7 m) tall and 35 feet (11 m) wide, and range in length from 180 feet (55 m) to 725 feet (221 m). The largest battery contains 100 ovens built back-to-back, and the smallest battery contains 24 built back-to-back. The lone "single" battery contains 38 ovens, and measures 580 feet (180 m). Each battery rests on a foundation of clay.

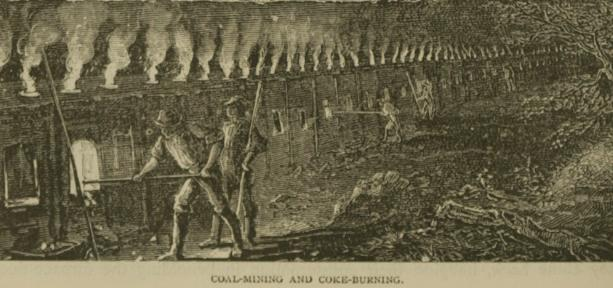
1879 illustration showing coke ovens in operation at an unnamed location

The ovens themselves are 12 feet (3.7 m) in diameter, with sandstone exteriors and firebrick interiors. Each oven has an opening at the top and a "window" on the side. In the early 1900s, railroad tracks ran across the top of each battery. An incline railway connected the ovens to a coal mine further up the mountain slope, and railroad cars would carry coal from the mine to the tops of the batteries and dump the coal into the ovens' top openings.

During the coking process, a laborer would level the deposited coal through the side window using a scaper. Once the coal was ready, the side window would be sealed with clay, leaving a 1-inch (2.5 cm) opening to allow the entry of air. The process, which essentially involves heating bituminous coal in a closed chamber to remove its volatile material, took about 72 hours. At the end of the process, the clay seal was broken, and the coke was removed and placed on a train for shipment to an iron furnace in Chattanooga. Two tons of coal typically produced one ton of coke.

== History ==
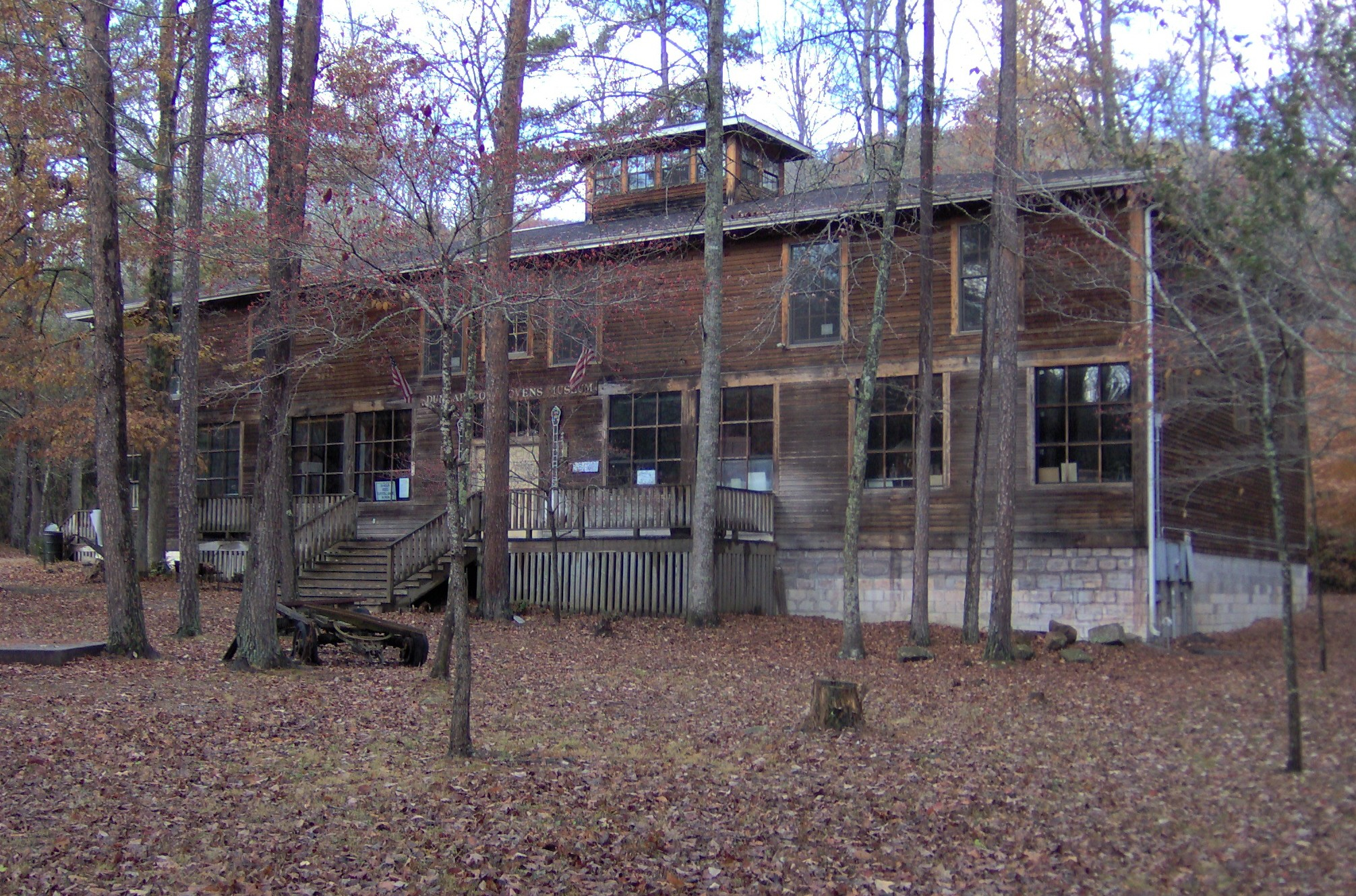
Reconstructed commissary (now the Coke Ovens Museum)

The arrival of the railroad in the 1880s brought major coal mining operations to the southern Cumberland Plateau. Coal was first mined on Fredonia Mountain in 1899, although it was considered too soft for domestic purposes. The following year, the Douglas Coal and Coke Company purchased a 14,000-acre (5,700 ha) tract of land around the base of Fredonia Mountain for the mining of coal and production of coke. By 1902, Douglas had constructed the first 50 coke ovens, developed several coal mines, built the incline railway, and had established a company town with a commissary and clubhouse. The company suffered from labor problems, however, and never quite developed a method of separating the dirt from the coal. In 1904, Douglas halted operations.

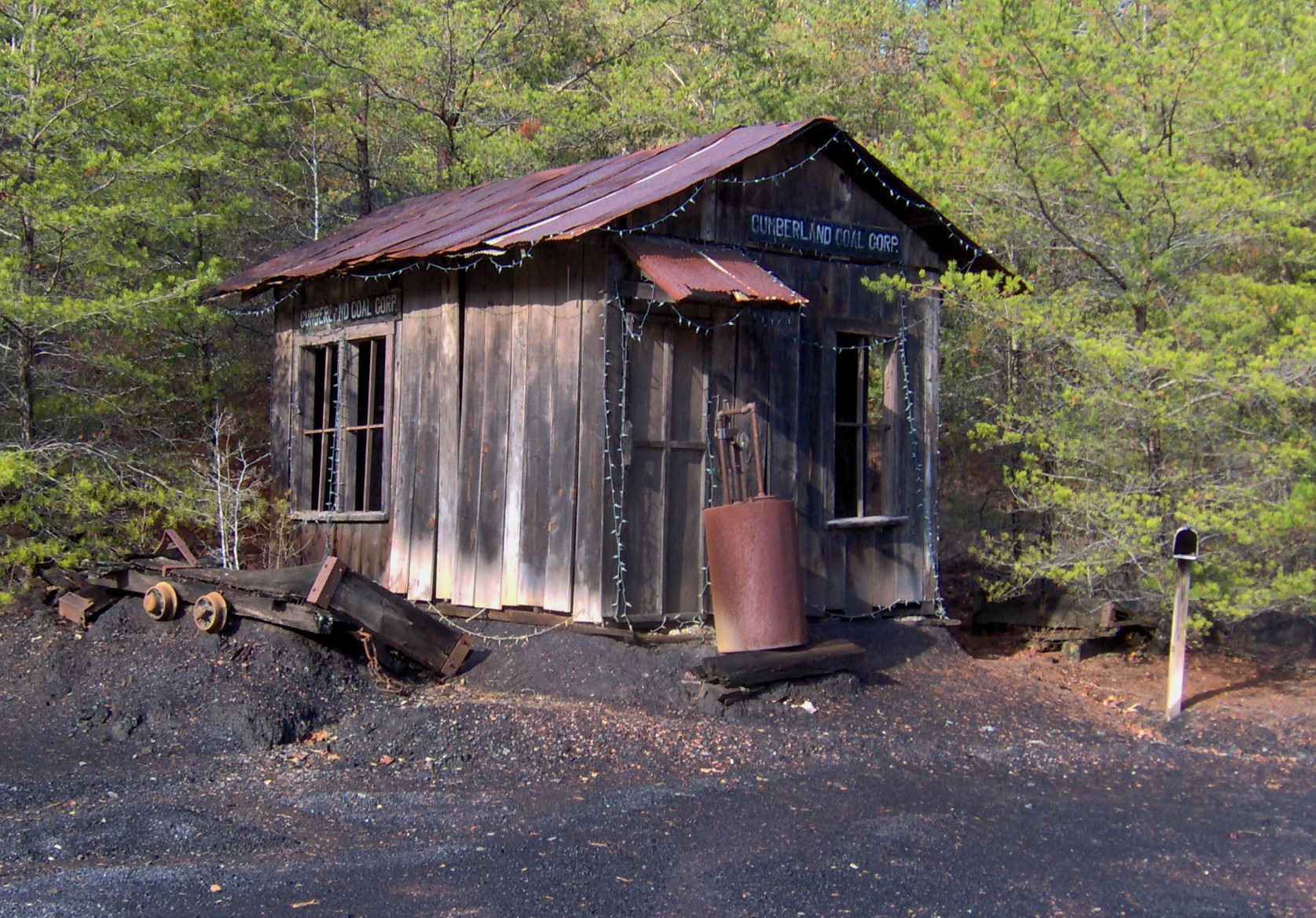
Shed and tools on display at the Dunlap Coke Ovens Park mine replica

The Chattanooga Iron and Coal Company purchased the Douglas operation in 1905, and the following year built a steam-powered coal washer and constructed additional coke ovens. Chattanooga Iron and Coal owned quarries in Georgia and a blast furnace in the Tannery Flats section of Chattanooga. At its blast furnace, the company used coke from its Dunlap operation to convert iron ore mined at its Georgia quarries into pig iron. The operation proved profitable until 1916, when a boiler explosion destroyed its coal washer. The company built a new washer and added more coke ovens that year, but the cost and poor performance of the new washer drained the company financially. In 1919, the company sold its entire iron and coke operation to the Southern States Iron and Coal Company.

By 1920, Dunlap effectively consisted of two towns, just under a mile apart. Dunlap proper (the town's courthouse square and downtown area) had a population of 765, whereas the company town operated by Southern States Iron and Coal (at the present coke ovens park site) had a population of 700. The company's 350-man Dunlap workforce included a sizeable African-American population that was segregated. The coke ovens required a crew of 85 to remain in full operation. Southern States Iron and Coal produced coke at Dunlap until 1922, when it shut down its Dunlap operations. In 1928, brothers E.P. and E.K. Rosamund purchased Southern States' Dunlap properties with plans to revive the coke operation, but with the onset of the Great Depression and plummeting coal prices, their plans never materialized.

== Dunlap Coke Ovens Park ==
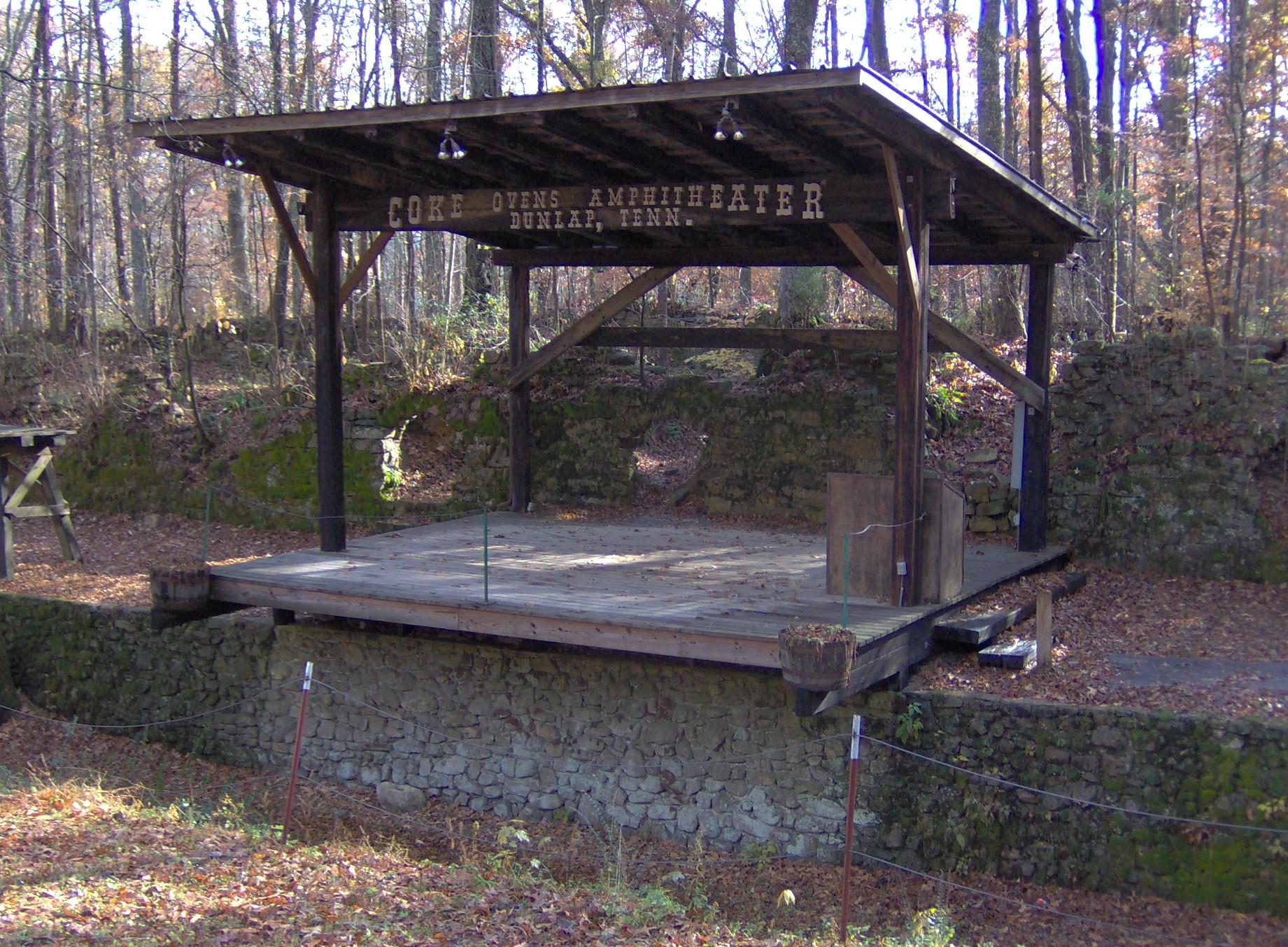
Amphitheater, with battery of ovens in the background

After the 1920s, the Dunlap Coke Ovens lay dormant for over a half century. By the 1980s, all that remained of the Dunlap operations were the ovens, a slate pile and coal washer ruins, two company houses (drastically modified), and the clubhouse. Some of the ovens retained only their sandstone frame, some retained only their brick interiors, and some had collapsed entirely.

In 1985, the ovens were added to the National Register of Historic Places. The property, which had come under the ownership of the Bowater Corporation, was donated to the Sequatchie Valley Historical Association later that same year. With the help of hundreds of volunteers, the association cleared tons of trash from the area, and the Dunlap Coke Ovens Park opened in 1987. To raise funds for park staffing and maintenance, the Sequatchie Valley Historical Association built an amphitheater adjacent to one of the oven batteries, and held its first annual Coke Ovens Bluegrass Festival. In 1989, the park received $71,000 (~$155,862 in 2024) from the estate of Rhea County historian David Henry Gray, which it used to reconstruct the commissary on its original foundation. The reconstructed building now houses the Coke Ovens Museum.

Along with the museum, ovens, and amphitheater, Dunlap Coke Ovens Park includes a coal mine replica with mining machinery on display, the ruins of the 1906 coal washer, a replica of the Dunlap depot, a caboose, and various park shelters. A hiking trail now follows the incline railway grade to the former mining areas atop Fredonia Mountain.

== Annual bluegrass festival ==
The park's signature event is the annual bluegrass festival, which takes place the first weekend in June. The event attracts bands and fans from around the region, including the strong bluegrass community in Chattanooga. The festival continues the long friendship between bluegrass musicians and the historical association. Local pickers played an integral role in the development of the park from the beginning, providing effort, connections, and entertainment to help with clean-up, construction, and fundraising. The event is promoted as family-friendly.

== Documentary ==
In 2008, filmmaker Charli Wyatt produced a half-hour program about the park and bluegrass festival. "Coke Ovens Slaves" tells the story of the volunteers and musicians who work to preserve local history and culture through the Coke Ovens park and festival. The program aired several times on Chattanooga's PBS station, WTCI. A DVD was also released locally. The title of the film refers to a song written by Ed Brown, the festival's music director and an original member of the historical society.

== Bluegrass monument ==
In 2008, a group of local bluegrass fans erected and dedicated a monument to those bluegrass musicians who have performed at the park or in the Sequatchie Valley. Musicians' names are inscribed on stone slabs on each side of the monument.
