= Rock/Creek =

American sporting goods retailer

- Company type: Private
- Industry: Retail, outdoor industry
- Founded: 1987
- Headquarters: Chattanooga, Tennessee
- Key people: Dawson Wheeler and Marvin Webb, co-founders Jonathan Scott, vice president
- Products: Clothing and outdoor equipment
- Number of employees: 50-99
- Website: Rock/Creek

Rock/Creek is a Chattanooga, Tennessee-based sporting goods retailer of clothing and gear for rock climbing, paddling, trail running, hiking, camping and travel.

== History ==
Founded as Rock/Creek Outfitters and Canoeist Headquarters in 1987 when Dawson Wheeler and Marvin Webb purchased Canoeist Headquarters, the company became known as Rock/Creek Outfitters. The name was shortened to Rock/Creek in 2007.

In November 2007, Rock/Creek was named one of the top 25 specialty outdoor retailers by Outdoor Business magazine. In 2009, SNEWS & Backpacker Magazine chose Rock/Creek as Retailer of the Year for Best Online Business.

Rock/Creek has a total of five brick-and-mortar locations. They have two flagship stores, one in downtown Chattanooga and the other at Hamilton Place Mall, two paddling stores and an e-commerce site. In 2007, Rock/Creek opened a new store in the Two North Shore development in downtown Chattanooga. The project, developed by CS & Associates and Greenlife Grocery, has been designed with U.S. Green Building Council's LEED standards in mind. The latest store to open is located at The Block, the largest adaptive reuse project in Chattanooga.

Rock/Creek selected Art Technology Group to revamp its Web site in Fall 2010. Since that date, the company has been listed on Internet Retailer's "Second 500" list. For the 2012 list they were #644.

In October 2014, a Chattanooga shop employee pursued a shoplifter on foot and the story went viral after being picked up by Trail Runner Magazine.

== Charity and environmental initiatives ==
Rock/Creek regularly gives money to environmental non-profits and sponsors trail building and cleanup efforts. The retailer created the Rock/Creek StumpJump 50k in 2002 to raise awareness and funds for the Cumberland Trail. This race has expanded and now forms part of a larger Rock/Creek Trail Series, with trail running events throughout the year ranging from 5 miles to 50 miles. Past campaigns have included working with Chaco footwear to send used shoes to orphans in Nepal through the dZi Foundation.

Rock/Creek has been featured in local media for its involvement in local trail races as well as the 3 State 3 Mountain Challenge, a bike century.

== Affiliations ==
Rock/Creek is a member of the Grassroots Outdoor Alliance, a group of independent outdoor shops dedicated to the sustainability of the specialty outdoor channel and the quality of the outdoor enthusiast's experience. The retailer is also a member of the Outdoor Industry Association.

Rock/Creek employees serve on nonprofit boards as well. Founder Dawson Wheeler serves on the board of SAWS (Southern Appalachian Wilderness Stewards). Marketing Director Mark McKnight serves on the board of local land trust Lula Lake Land Trust. Wheeler has been involved in lobbying for wilderness protection in the Cherokee National Forest and is cited in press interviews around the topic.
