= North Chickamauga Creek Gorge State Park =

- Interactive map of North Chickamauga Creek Gorge State Park
- Type: Tennessee State Park
- Location: Hamilton, Sequatchie counties
- Coordinates: 35.255°N 85.263°W
- Area: 6,000 acres (24 km^{2})
- Website: Website

North Chickamauga Creek Gorge State Park is a nearly 6,000 acres (24 km^{2}) state park in Hamilton and Sequatchie counties in the U.S. state of Tennessee, located 15 miles north of Chattanooga with the main entrance located near Soddy-Daisy.

The park was created in 2024 after being a state natural area and managed by the Justin P. Wilson Cumberland Trail State Park and perseveres the North Chickamauga Creek gorge, the Creek which is a Tennessee State Scenic River.

The park is billed as the Southern Gateway to the Cumberland Trail.

== History ==
The park was originally established as a state natural area in 1999 and became a popular place for whitewater kayaking, fishing and hiking.

== Amenities ==
The park currently offers, as of October 2024, 4 backcountry camp sites, hiking and mountain biking trails with plans to build a visitor center, better parking and an ADA viewing platform and improved trails.
