= Cumberland Trail =

Cumberland Trail may refer to:

- Cumberland Trail, which went through Cumberland Gap and is now part of the Justin P. Wilson Cumberland Trail State Park in Tennessee
- Cumberland Road, also called Cumberland Trail, that is now part of the National Road
