= KAPT =

KAPT may refer to:

- KAPT-LP, a defunct low-power television station (channel 29) formerly licensed to serve Alamogordo, New Mexico, United States
- Marion County Airport (Tennessee) (ICAO code KAPT)
