= StumpJump 50k =

Ultramarathon in Tennessee, United States

StumpJump 50k Race Logo

The "'StumpJump 50k'" is an ultramarathon in the Southeastern United States that features a grueling course of extreme elevation changes and technical trail sections. The annual event takes place the first Saturday in October on the Signal Mountain, Tennessee, portion of the Cumberland Trail. In 2007, the race field was limited to 400 participants to minimize impact on this wilderness area. The race benefits the Cumberland Trail Conference and, in 2007, raised $4,000 for CTC's trail-building and maintenance programs.

== Course ==
The course is shaped like a lollipop, with a total elevation gain of several thousand feet. Runners leave the stick of the lollipop at mile 10.3, then run a 10.2-mile loop and rejoin the stick at mile 20.5. This means that runners see the first 10 or so miles twice, which contains the most elevation change in the whole race. Runners cross Suck Creek Road twice.

The 50k course's first and last 4 miles are on a jeep/dirt road. For the middle portion of the race, the trail is predominantly technical singletrack made of packed dirt and mountain stone, including one section that runners have nicknamed the "Rock Garden".

== History and records ==
The Rock/Creek StumpJump 50k was started in 2001 by local trail running enthusiast Matt Sims to raise support for the Cumberland Trail Conference and promote local participation in trail running. Today, the race attracts some of trail running's top athletes, including Max King, Duncan Callahan, John Stamstad, Josh Beckham, Peter Kazery, Bryan Dayton, and David Riddle, who holds the course record of 3 hours 49 min. and 52 seconds, set in 2011. Kris Whorton holds the women's record with a time of 4:50:39. The race was founded with the support of Rock/Creek, a local retailer. Today, the race is a part of the Bad Beard Events race series.
