= Brush Creek, Sequatchie County, Tennessee =

Brush Creek, Tennessee
- Unincorporated community
- Location within Tennessee Location within the United States
- Coordinates: 35°24′41″N 85°23′05″W
- Country: United States
- State: Tennessee
- County: Sequatchie
- Elevation: 797 ft (243 m)
- Time zone: UTC-6 (Central (CST))
  - Summer (DST): UTC-5 (CDT)
- Area code: 423
- GNIS feature ID: 1314751

Brush Creek is an unincorporated community in Sequatchie County, Tennessee, United States.
