= Little Mountain (Tennessee) =

Mountain in Tennessee, United States of America

- Location within Tennessee

Highest point
- Elevation: 2,067 ft (630 m)
- Coordinates: 35°34′12″N 85°16′51″W

Geography
- Location: Bledsoe County, Tennessee, U.S.
- Parent range: Appalachian Mountains
- Topo map: USGS Brockdell

Little Mountain is a summit in the U.S. state of Tennessee. Part of the Cumberland Plateau, Little Mountain is a section of the Cumberland Escarpment separating the Cumberland Plateau from the Sequatchie Valley.

Little Mountain is in Bledsoe County, Tennessee, just west of Pikeville.
