= Tom Fairfield Brown =

American politician (1926–2012)

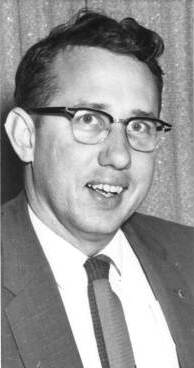

Chair of the Florida Republican Party
- In office June 23, 1962 – June 18, 1966
- Preceded by: G. Harold Alexander
- Succeeded by: William F. Murfin

Personal details
- Born: June 20, 1926
- Died: September 29, 2012 (aged 86)
- Party: Republican
- Spouse: Ora Katherine Cannon (m. 1950)
- Children: 5
- Education: University of Florida Levin College of Law

Tom Fairfield Brown Sr. (June 20, 1926 – September 29, 2012) was an American lawyer in Tampa, Florida who served as chairman of the Florida Republican Party from 1962 to 1966.

== Early life ==
Brown was born on June 20, 1926, to Sidney C. Brown and Myra Fairfield. He graduated from Hillsborough High School and the University of Florida Levin College of Law in 1951. He served in the United States Navy during World War II. He practiced law in Tampa beginning in 1951.

== Political career ==
Brown was first involved in politics when he volunteered for the Robert A. Taft headquarters in 1952. That same year, he ran as the Republican candidate for the state legislature from Hillsborough County, where he received 20,000 votes. In 1956, he was a delegate to the Republican National Convention. He served as an alternate delegate to William C. Cramer in 1960. On June 23, 1962, he defeated Charles R. Holley for the chairmanship and was elected, succeeding G. Harold Alexander. One of his first priorities was to move the GOP headquarters from Fort Myers to Tampa.

== Personal life ==
In 1950, he married Katherine C. Brown, (née Ora Katherine Cannon) who he met on a New Years' Eve blind date in Tampa in 1946. They had five children.
