= Harold Alexander (Florida politician) =

American politician (1902–1967)

G. Harold Alexander
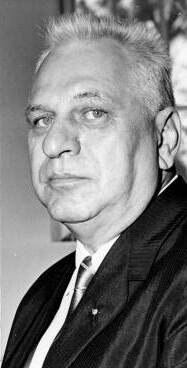

Chair of the Florida Republican Party
- In office June 14, 1950 – June 15, 1962
- Preceded by: Cyril C. Spades
- Succeeded by: Tom Fairfield Brown

Personal details
- Born: February 1, 1902 Dunlap, Tennessee, U.S.
- Died: May 12, 1967 (aged 65) New Orleans, Louisiana, U.S.
- Resting place: Coral Ridge Cemetery in Cape Coral, Florida
- Party: Republican
- Spouse: Olive L. Alexander
- Children: 2
- Education: University of Chattanooga

George Harold Alexander (February 1, 1902 – May 12, 1967) was a Florida politician who served as state chairman of the Florida Republican Party from 1950 to 1962. He served in the Florida House of Representatives.

== Early life ==
Alexander was born on February 1, 1902, in Dunlap, Tennessee. He moved to Florida as a young boy. He attended the University of Chattanooga. After graduating, he joined his father in the real estate business.

== Career ==
Alexander was first involved in politics during the Hoover administration. He was a delegate to every Republican National Convention since 1940. He served as chairman of the Florida delegation in 1952, 1956, and 1960. In 1952 and 1956, he was the state chairman of the Eisenhower campaign, and in 1960, for Nixon.

He was elected chairman of the state party on June 14, 1950, and served until he stepped down on June 15, 1962.

He died on May 12, 1967, in New Orleans at age 65 due to a kidney ailment.

Party political offices
Preceded by Cyril C. Spades	Chairman of the Florida Republican Party; 1950–1962	Succeeded by Tom Fairfield Brown, Sr.
