= Dakota Hudson =

American baseball player (born 1994)

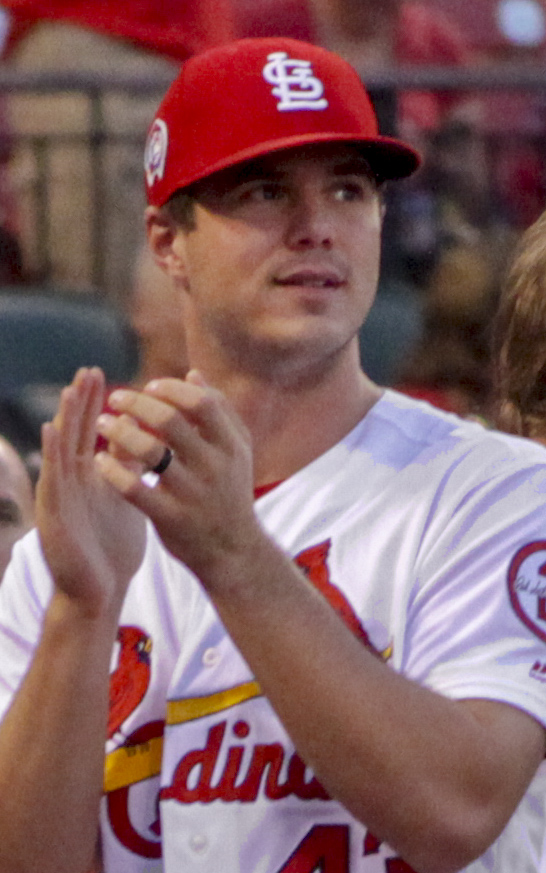
- Hudson with the St. Louis Cardinals in 2018

Free agent
- Pitcher
- Born: September 15, 1994 (age 31); Dunlap, Tennessee, U.S.
- Bats: Right Throws: Right

MLB debut
- July 28, 2018, for the St. Louis Cardinals

MLB statistics (through 2024 season)
- Win–loss record: 40–32
- Earned run average: 4.21
- Strikeouts: 364
- Stats at Baseball Reference

Teams
- St. Louis Cardinals (2018–2023); Colorado Rockies (2024)

Dakota Ryan Hudson (born September 15, 1994) is an American professional baseball pitcher who is a free agent. He has previously played in Major League Baseball (MLB) for the St. Louis Cardinals and Colorado Rockies. He made his MLB debut in 2018 with the Cardinals and signed with the Rockies before the 2024 season.

== Amateur career ==
Hudson attended Sequatchie County High School in Dunlap, Tennessee. During his junior year in 2012, he committed to Mississippi State University to play college baseball. As a senior, he had a 1.09 earned run average (ERA) with 124 strikeouts in 64 innings. Hudson was drafted by the Texas Rangers in the 36th round of the 2013 Major League Baseball draft, but he did not sign and attended Mississippi State.

As a freshman for the Mississippi State Bulldogs in 2014, Hudson started five games and made one relief appearance. He went 1–2 with a 4.67 ERA and 10 strikeouts. As a sophomore in 2015, he made 17 appearances in relief, going 1–1 with a 4.32 ERA with 26 strikeouts. Hudson then pitched for the Hyannis Harbor Hawks of the Cape Cod Baseball League in the summer of 2015 before returning to starting his junior year in 2016. Hudson started 17 games for the Bulldogs, going 9–5 with a 2.55 ERA and 115 strikeouts in 113 innings pitched. He was named to the All-SEC First Team.

== Professional career ==
=== St. Louis Cardinals (2016–2023) ===
==== Minor leagues ====
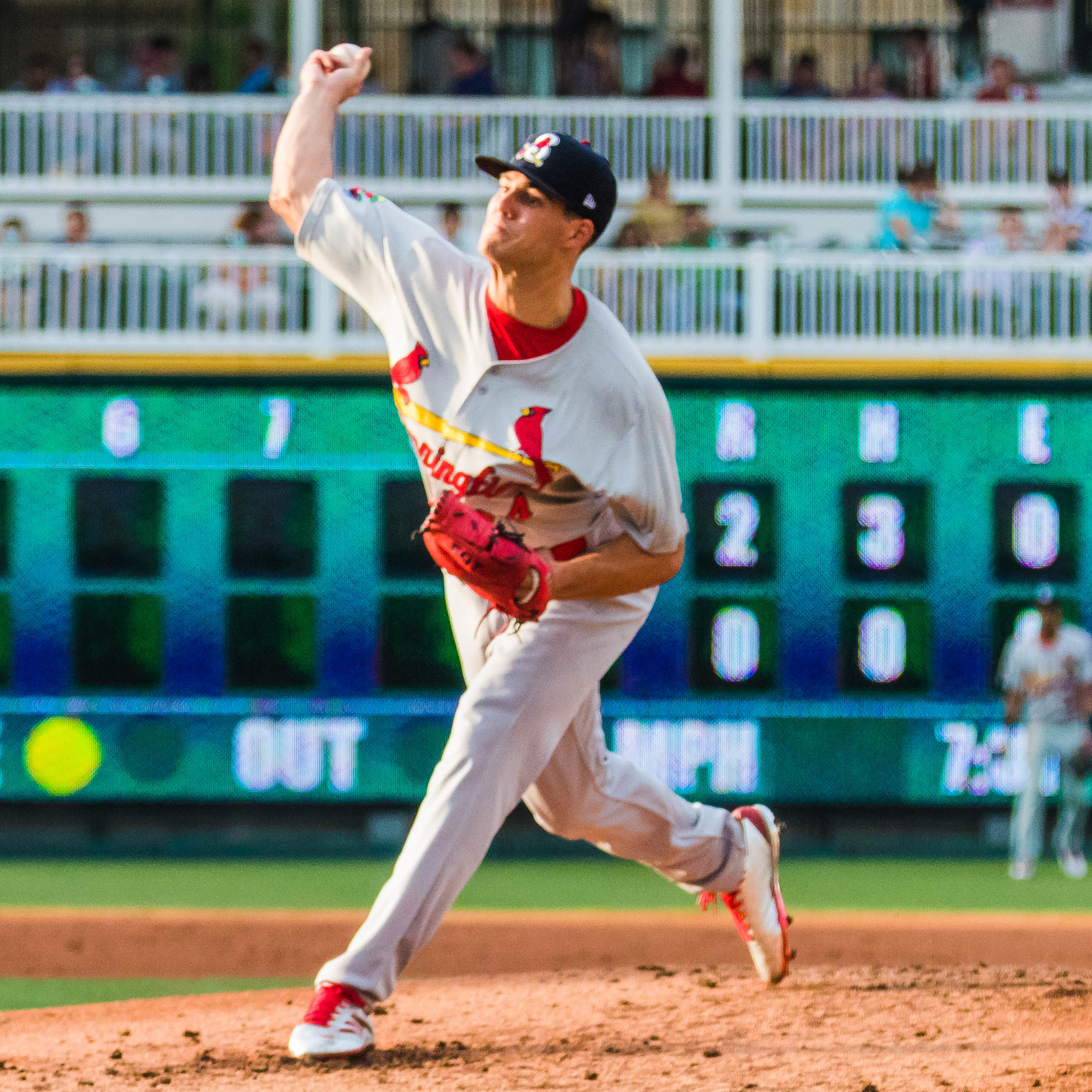
Hudson in the 2017 Texas League All-Star Game.

Hudson was considered a top prospect for the 2016 Major League Baseball draft, and he was drafted by the St. Louis Cardinals in the first round, with the 34th overall selection. He signed for a $2 million signing bonus and was assigned to the Gulf Coast League Cardinals, and after pitching four scoreless innings in four games, was promoted to the Palm Beach Cardinals, where he finished the season with a 1–1 record and 0.96 ERA in eight appearances out of the bullpen. He began 2017 with the Springfield Cardinals and was named the starting pitcher for the Texas League All-Star Game, which took place on June 27. After earning a 9–4 record and 2.53 ERA in 18 starts, he was promoted to the Memphis Redbirds on July 29. For Memphis, he started seven games, posting a 1–1 record and 4.42 ERA. He was named the Texas League Pitcher of the Year.

Hudson was a non-roster invitee to 2018 spring training. He began the 2018 season in Memphis, and was named the starting pitcher for the Pacific Coast League All-Star Game that was played on July 11. In July 2018, he was selected to represent the Cardinals in the 2018 All-Star Futures Game.

==== Major leagues ====
The Cardinals promoted Hudson to the major leagues for the first time on July 27, 2018. He spent the remainder of the season in St. Louis, compiling a 4–1 record with a 2.63 ERA and a 1.35 WHIP in 27 1/3 relief innings pitched.

Hudson was named St. Louis' fifth starter going into the 2019 season. Over 33 games (32 starts) during the regular season, he went 16–7 with a 3.35 ERA, striking out 136 over 174 2/3 innings, and had the highest ground ball percentage in the majors (56.9%), and the lowest fly ball percentage in the majors (21.3%). He led all major league pitchers in walks, with 86, had the highest BB/9 in the major leagues (4.43), had the highest walk percentage in the major leagues (11.4%), and had the worst strikeout-to-walk ratio in the majors (1.58).

On September 28, 2020, Hudson underwent Tommy John surgery. On the year, Hudson had recorded a 2.77 ERA over 39 innings pitched.

On April 15, 2021, Hudson was placed on the 60-day injured list as he continued to recover from Tommy John surgery. He was activated on September 24, and pitched 8 2/3 innings for the Cardinals in 2021. In 2022 he was 8–7 with a 4.45 ERA, and had the lowest strikeout-to-walk ratio among major league pitchers, at 1.3.

On January 13, 2023, Hudson agreed to a one-year, $2.65 million contract with the Cardinals, avoiding salary arbitration. Hudson was optioned to Triple-A Memphis to begin the 2023 season. Manager Oliver Marmol told reporters that the move was in part to help build up Hudson’s velocity. He was non-tendered and became a free agent on November 17.

=== Colorado Rockies (2024) ===
On January 5, 2024, Hudson signed a one-year contract with the Colorado Rockies. In 18 starts for the Rockies, he struggled to a 2–12 record and a 6.17 ERA with 49 strikeouts and 50 walks across 89 innings pitched. On July 7, Hudson was designated for assignment following the promotion of Tanner Gordon. He cleared waivers and was sent outright to the Triple–A Albuquerque Isotopes on July 11. On August 10, Hudson's contract was selected by the Rockies and he was added to the active roster. However, the next day he was placed on the injured list with right elbow inflammation. Hudson was transferred to the 60–day injured list on September 5, ending his season. On October 18, he was removed from the 40–man roster and sent outright to Albuquerque, but rejected the assignment and elected free agency.

=== Los Angeles Angels (2025) ===
On December 9, 2024, Hudson signed a minor league contract with the Los Angeles Angels. He made 28 appearances (24 starts) for the Triple-A Salt Lake Bees in 2025, posting an 8–7 record and 6.68 ERA with 89 strikeouts over 136 innings of work. Hudson elected free agency following the season on November 6, 2025.

=== Kansas City Monarchs (2026) ===
On February 16, 2026, Hudson signed with the Kansas City Monarchs of the independent American Association of Professional Baseball. He made seven starts and had a 6-1 record, a 2.09 ERA, and 29 strikeouts over 43 innings. On August 10, Hudson was released by the Monarchs.

== Personal life ==
Hudson proposed to girlfriend Ashlen Cyr in March 2017. The two were married on December 9, 2017, and their first child, a son, was born on May 7, 2018.
