= Raymond H. Cooley =

- Born: May 7, 1916; Dunlap, Tennessee, US
- Died: March 12, 1947 (aged 30); South Pittsburg, Tennessee, US
- Burial place: Cumberland View Cemetery, Kimball, Tennessee
- Military career
- Allegiance: United States of America
- Branch: United States Army
- Rank: Master Sergeant
- Units: Company B, 27th Infantry, 25th Infantry Division
- Conflicts: World War II
- Awards: Medal of Honor

Raymond Henry Cooley (May 7, 1916 – March 12, 1947) was a soldier who received the Medal of Honor for actions in the campaign to recapture the Philippines from Japanese forces during World War II. Cooley joined the Army from Tennessee in September 1941. Cooley is one of a few known Medal of Honor recipients to have fallen on a grenade and survived.

== Medal of Honor citation ==
Rank and organization: Staff Sergeant, U.S. Army, Company B, 27th Infantry, 25th Infantry Division. Place and date: Near Lumboy, Luzon, Philippine Islands, February 24, 1945. Entered service at: Richard City, Tenn. Born: May 7, 1916, Dunlap, Tenn. G.O. No.: 77, September 10, 1945.

Citation:

He was a platoon guide in an assault on a camouflaged entrenchment defended by machineguns, rifles, and mortars. When his men were pinned down by 2 enemy machineguns, he voluntarily advanced under heavy fire to within 20 yards of 1 of the guns and attacked it with a hand grenade. The enemy, however, threw the grenade back at him before it could explode. Arming a second grenade, he held it for several seconds of the safe period and then hurled it into the enemy position, where it exploded instantaneously, destroying the gun and crew. He then moved toward the remaining gun, throwing grenades into enemy foxholes as he advanced. Inspired by his actions, 1 squad of his platoon joined him. After he had armed another grenade and was preparing to throw it into the second machinegun position, 6 enemy soldiers rushed at him. Knowing he could not dispose of the armed grenade without injuring his comrades, because of the intermingling in close combat of the men of his platoon and the enemy in the melee which ensued, he deliberately covered the grenade with his body and was severely wounded as it exploded. By his heroic actions, S/Sgt. Cooley not only silenced a machinegun and so inspired his fellow soldiers that they pressed the attack and destroyed the remaining enemy emplacements, but also, in complete disregard of his own safety, accepted certain injury and possible loss of life to avoid wounding his comrades.

== After the war ==
Cooley returned home to Tennessee, where he and fellow Medal of Honor recipients Charles Coolidge and Paul Huff led a 4th of July celebration in 1946. Cooley's life after the war was brief and tragic. He suffered agony from his war wounds and became addicted to both drugs and alcohol. He died from a car accident by running into a brick wall on March 12, 1947. It was determined that he had been driving under the influence. Highway 28 between Jasper and I-24 in Tennessee is now officially named the Raymond H Cooley Highway.

== Awards and decorations ==

Badge	Combat Infantryman Badge		
1st row	Medal of Honor	Bronze Star Medal	Purple Heart
2nd row	Army Good Conduct Medal	American Defense Service Medal	American Campaign Medal
3rd row	Asiatic-Pacific Campaign Medal with one bronze campaign star	World War II Victory Medal	Philippine Liberation Medal
Unit awards	Philippine Presidential Unit Citation		

== See also ==
- List of Medal of Honor recipients for World War II
