= Sequatchie River =

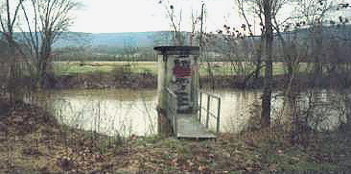
- A stream gage along the Sequatchie River near Whitwell, Tennessee

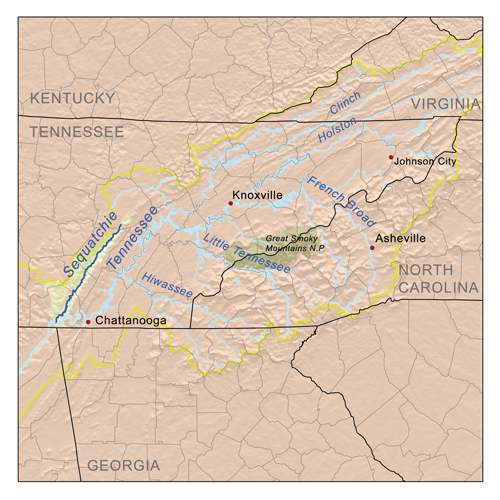
- The Sequatchie drainage basin

Location
- Country: United States
- State: Tennessee

Physical characteristics
- Source: Brady Mountain in Cumberland County, Tennessee
  - coordinates: 35°49′17″N 84°58′40″W
  - elevation: 2,460 ft (750 m)
- Mouth: Tennessee River near Jasper, Tennessee
  - coordinates: 35°01′31″N 85°38′07″W
  - elevation: 597 ft (182 m)
- Length: 116 mi (187 km)
- Basin size: 602 sq mi (1,560 km^{2})
- Discharge
  - location: Whitwell, Tennessee, 25.1 miles (40.4 km) above the mouth(mean for water years 1920-1983)
  - average: 745 cu ft/s (21.1 m^{3}/s)(mean for water years 1920-1983)
  - minimum: 16 cu ft/s (0.45 m^{3}/s); September 1925
  - maximum: 32,500 cu ft/s (920 m^{3}/s); March 1973

Basin features
- Tributaries
  - right: Little Sequatchie River

The Sequatchie River is a 116-mile-long (187 km) waterway that drains the Sequatchie Valley, a large valley in the Cumberland Plateau in Tennessee. It empties into the Tennessee River downstream from Chattanooga near the Tennessee-Alabama state line.

== Hydrography ==
The Sequatchie River originates from several springs at or near Devilstep Hollow Cave, including the spring, Head of the Sequatchie, which is protected as part of the Justin P. Wilson Cumberland Trail State Park. Dye traces establish the origin of their water as originating from Grassy Cove, the pastoral limestone sinkhole located to the north-east. The Sequatchie River follows the general trend of the Sequatchie Valley, flowing south-west for 182.12 mi (293.09 km).

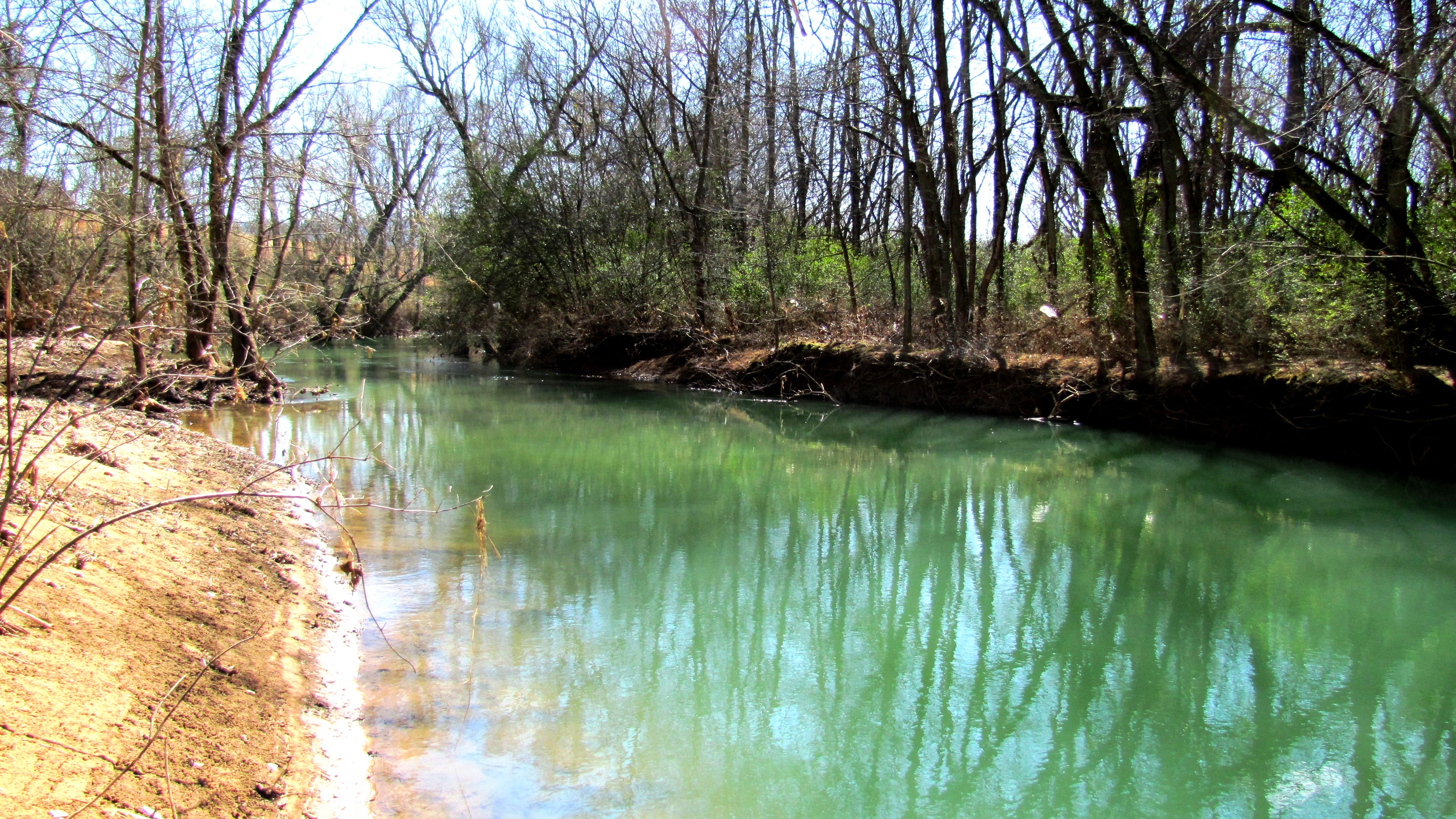
Sequatchie River in Pikeville, Tennessee

The stream crosses into Bledsoe County near the head of the Sequatchie Valley. The Sequatchie Valley is traversed throughout much of its length by U.S. Route 127. The first sizeable town on the Sequatchie is Pikeville, the county seat of Bledsoe. State Route 30, which descends Walden's Ridge into the Valley and then climbs the escarpment back onto the plateau, crosses here.

Crossing into Sequatchie County, the stream flows into Dunlap. Just north of Dunlap, US 127 turns southeastward, beginning the ascent onto Walden Ridge and eventually down into Chattanooga. A set of railroad tracks previously ran along the river from this point, a testament to heavy underground coal extraction in years past. For almost the rest of its length, the Sequatchie is paralleled by State Route 28 (SR 28). SR 283 also runs along the base of the Walden's Ridge escarpment for several miles. The river then enters Marion County. The town of Whitwell is just a few miles into Marion County. Below Whitwell at the small community of Sequatchie (also known as Sequachee), the river receives the flow of the Little Sequatchie River, which descends from atop the Cumberland Plateau to the west. At Jasper, which is slightly west of the river, there is a railroad junction. East of town is the crossing of U.S. Highway 41 by SR 28, and the bridge over the river. Shortly south of the Interstate 24 bridge is the mouth of the Sequatchie into the Guntersville Lake impoundment of the Tennessee River.

== See also ==
- List of Tennessee rivers
