= Dunlap, Tennessee =

- City
- Location of Dunlap in Sequatchie County, Tennessee.
- Coordinates: 35°22′38″N 85°23′18″W
- Country: United States
- State: Tennessee
- County: Sequatchie
- Founded: 1858
- Incorporated: 1901
- Named for: William Dunlap, state legislator

Government
  - Mayor: Clint Huth
  - County Executive: Keith Cartwright

Area
  - Total: 10.80 sq mi (27.98 km^{2})
  - Land: 10.80 sq mi (27.98 km^{2})
  - Water: 0 sq mi (0.00 km^{2})
- Elevation: 712 ft (217 m)

Population (2020)
  - Total: 5,357
  - Density: 495.9/sq mi (191.46/km^{2})
- Time zone: UTC-6 (Central (CST))
  - Summer (DST): UTC-5 (CDT)
- ZIP code: 37327
- Area code: 423
- FIPS code: 47-22000
- GNIS feature ID: 1283187
- Website: dunlaptn.gov

Dunlap is a city in and the county seat of Sequatchie County, Tennessee, United States. The population was 5,357 at the 2020 census and 4,815 at the 2010 census.

Dunlap is part of the Chattanooga metropolitan area.

== History ==
Dunlap was founded in 1858 as a county seat for Sequatchie County, which had been created the previous year. The city was named for state legislator William Claiborne Dunlap, who played a prominent role in the county's creation. The city's initial 40 acres (16 hectares), which were deeded to the county commissioners by Willam Rankin, were chosen due to their central location within the new county. Dunlap was incorporated as a city in 1941.

Around 1900, the Douglas Coal and Coke Company purchased 14,000 acres (5,700 hectares) of land in the Dunlap vicinity with plans to mine coal and convert the coal into industrial coke. Coke, which is created by heating coal and removing its volatile matter, is used primarily as a deoxidizing agent in the production of pig iron. To convert coal mined on nearby Fredonia Mountain into coke, Douglas built the first of 268 ovens. The company used an incline railway to move the coal from the mountain to the ovens. Although Douglas went bankrupt in 1904, the Chattanooga Iron and Coal Company purchased the ovens, and continued producing coke until 1927. In the 1980s and 1990s, the Sequatchie Valley Historical Association acquired the ruins of the coke ovens and established Dunlap Coke Ovens Park.

== Geography ==
Dunlap is located at 35°22′38″N 85°23′18″W (35.377236, -85.388455). The city is located near the center of Sequatchie Valley, a narrow, 65-mile-long (105 km) valley that slices through the Cumberland Plateau in southeastern Tennessee and northeastern Alabama. The plateau's western Sequatchie Valley escarpment, known locally as "Fredonia Mountain," rises over 1,000 feet (300 m) above the valley just west of Dunlap. The Sequatchie River forms the city's southeastern boundary.

U.S. Route 127 (called "Rankin Avenue" in Dunlap), which traverses much of the Tennessee section of Sequatchie Valley, connects Dunlap to Pikeville and Crossville to the north and Chattanooga opposite Signal Mountain to the southeast. S.R. 28, which intersects with U.S. 127 in Dunlap, connects the city to Jasper to the southwest. S.R. 111, which intersects US 127 a few miles north of Dunlap, connects the city to Chattanooga to the southeast and Spencer atop the plateau to the west.

According to the United States Census Bureau, the city has a total area of 8.6 square miles (22 km^{2}), all land.

== Demographics ==
Historical population
Census	Pop.	Note	%±
1880	133		—
1890	332		149.6%
1910	1,166		—
1920	1,465		25.6%
1930	1,295		−11.6%
1940	721		−44.3%
1950	873		21.1%
1960	1,488		70.4%
1970	1,672		12.4%
1980	3,681		120.2%
1990	3,731		1.4%
2000	4,173		11.8%
2010	4,815		15.4%
2020	5,357		11.3%
2025 (est.)	6,089	▲	13.7%

=== 2020 census ===
As of the 2020 census there was a population of 5,357, with 1,414 families residing in the city.

The median age was 38.6 years, with 23.4% of residents under the age of 18 and 19.0% 65 years of age or older. For every 100 females there were 94.4 males, and for every 100 females age 18 and over there were 92.8 males.

0.0% of residents lived in urban areas, while 100.0% lived in rural areas.

There were 1,984 households in Dunlap, of which 33.2% had children under the age of 18 living in them. Of all households, 41.0% were married-couple households, 17.8% were households with a male householder and no spouse or partner present, and 33.2% were households with a female householder and no spouse or partner present. About 27.0% of all households were made up of individuals and 13.6% had someone living alone who was 65 years of age or older.

There were 2,222 housing units, of which 10.7% were vacant. The homeowner vacancy rate was 1.4% and the rental vacancy rate was 6.0%.

Racial composition as of the 2020 census
Race	Number	Percent
White	4,801	89.6%
Black or African American	32	0.6%
American Indian and Alaska Native	44	0.8%
Asian	29	0.5%
Native Hawaiian and Other Pacific Islander	4	0.1%
Some other race	219	4.1%
Two or more races	228	4.3%
Hispanic or Latino (of any race)	368	6.9%

=== 2000 census ===
As of the census of 2000, there was a population of 4,173, with 1,642 households and 1,182 families residing in the city. The population density was 484.2 inhabitants per square mile (187.0/km^{2}). There were 1,767 housing units at an average density of 205.0 units per square mile (79.2 units/km^{2}). The racial makeup of the city was 98.87% White, 0.17% African American, 0.19% Native American, 0.24% Asian, 0.10% from other races, and 0.43% from two or more races. Hispanic or Latino of any race were 0.81% of the population.

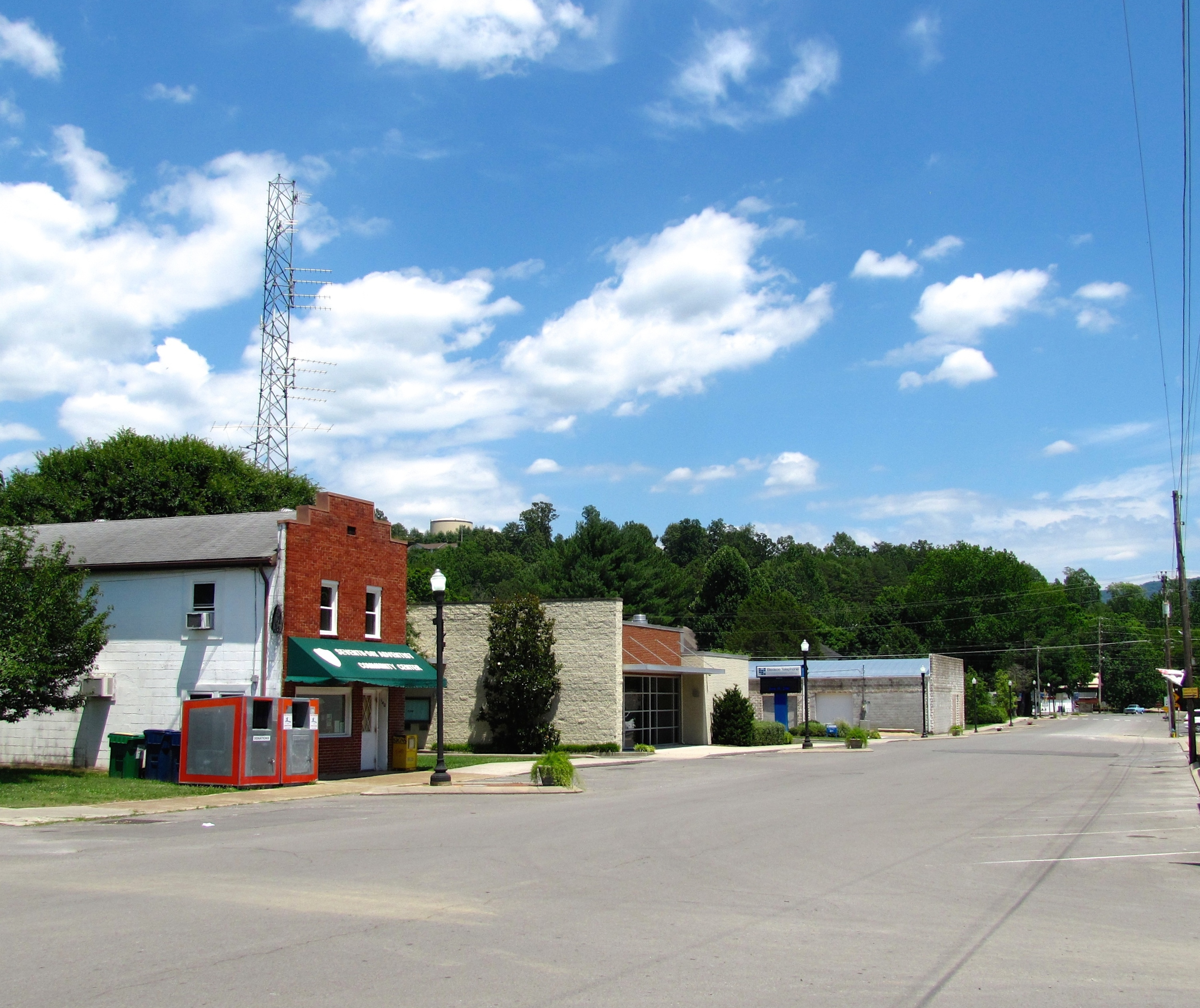
Cherry Street

There were 1,642 households, out of which 33.5% had children under the age of 18 living with them, 53.6% were married couples living together, 14.3% had a female householder with no husband present, and 28.0% were non-families. 25.3% of all households were made up of individuals, and 10.9% had someone living alone who was 65 years of age or older. The average household size was 2.47 and the average family size was 2.90.

In the city, the population was spread out, with 24.7% under the age of 18, 9.6% from 18 to 24, 28.3% from 25 to 44, 22.9% from 45 to 64, and 14.5% who were 65 years of age or older. The median age was 36 years. For every 100 females, there were 94.8 males. For every 100 females age 18 and over, there were 90.5 males.

The median income for a household in the city was $30,647, and the median income for a family was $34,542. Males had a median income of $26,118 versus $19,952 for females. The per capita income for the city was $17,567. About 18.1% of families and 20.1% of the population were below the poverty line, including 25.5% of those under age 18 and 27.9% of those age 65 or over.

== Schools ==
Sequatchie County has a consolidated school system which is located in Dunlap. The system operates with a superintendent and an elected school board.

The Sequatchie County School District has three schools:

- Griffith Elementary School (Grades: K–4th)
- Sequatchie County Middle School (Grades: 5th–8th)
- Sequatchie County High School (Grades: 9th–12th)

== Attractions ==
Several annual festivals, including a bluegrass festival, are held at the Dunlap Coke Ovens Park every year. Dunlap is often referred to as the "Hang Gliding Capital of the East" and is home to the East Coast Hang Gliding Championships and a hang gliding organization known as the Tennessee Tree Toppers. The Mount Airy Golf Course is located just north of the city at the Sequatchie-Bledsoe county line. Savage Gulf State Natural Area is located atop the Cumberland Plateau to the west and Prentice Cooper State Forest is located atop the plateau to the east.

== Notable people ==
- G. Harold Alexander (1902–1967) Republican politician in Florida, served as state chair from 1950 to 1962
- Raymond H. Cooley (1916–1947) – World War II soldier and Medal of Honor recipient
- Dakota Hudson – MLB pitcher Colorado Rockies
- Ray Phelps (1903–1971) - professional baseball player 1930–1936
- Tom Stewart (1892–1972) – U.S. Senator and Scopes Trial attorney
