= Walden Ridge =

Mountain in Tennessee, United States

Coordinates: 35°41′55″N 84°57′28″W

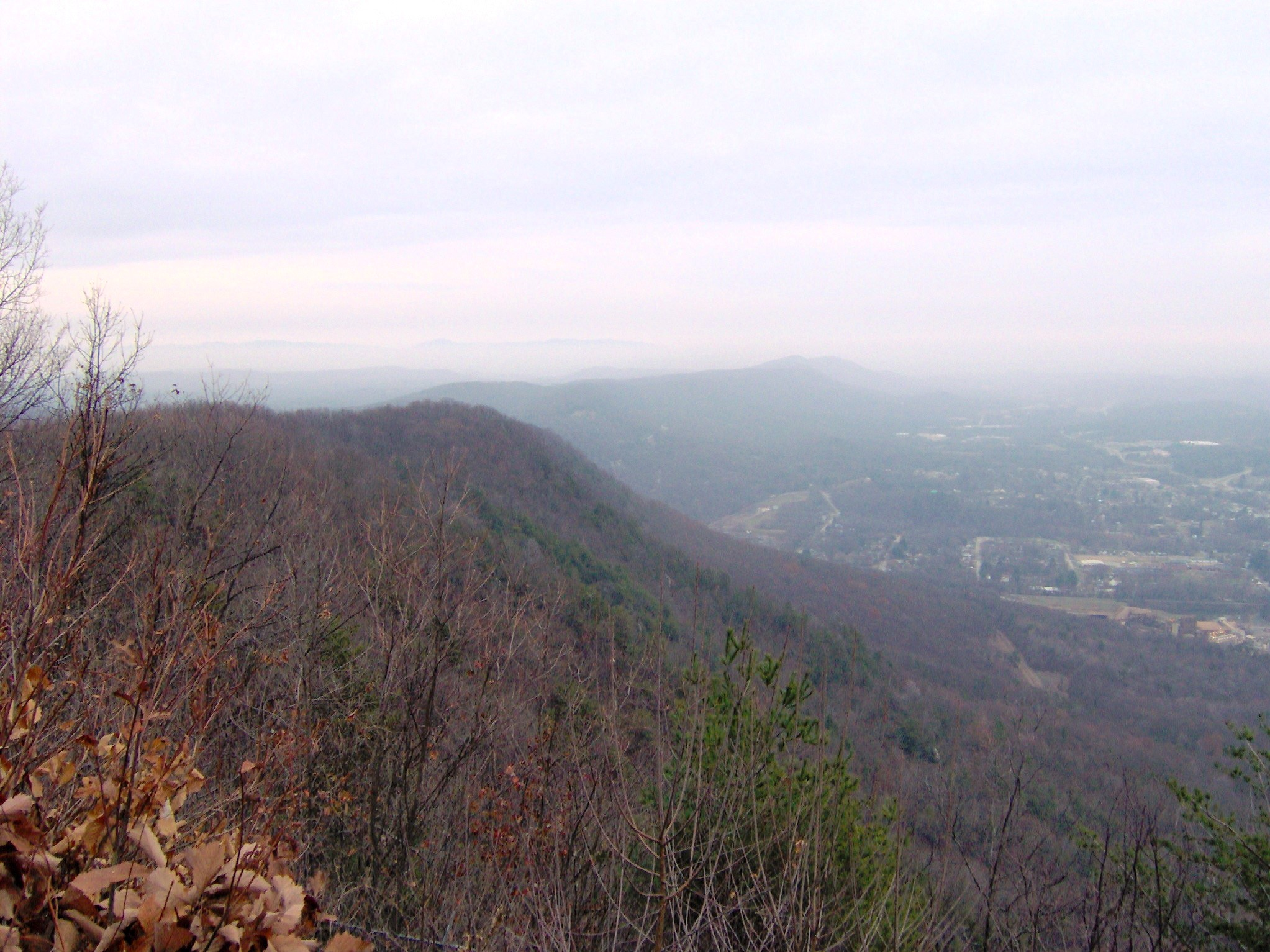
Walden Ridge, looking northeast from Mt. Roosevelt

Walden Ridge (or Walden's Ridge) is a mountain ridge and escarpment located in Tennessee in the United States. It makes up the portion of the Cumberland Plateau east of Sequatchie Valley between Raccoon Mountain and the southern edge of the central Appalachians. Walden Ridge is about 74 miles (119 km) long, running generally north-south. Its highest point is at Hinch Mountain (near Crossville), which reaches 3,048 feet (929 m) above sea level.

== Geology ==
Sequatchie Valley, a long valley in the Cumberland Plateau, is located just west of the southern part of Walden Ridge. The Sequatchie River runs through the valley. Being part of the Cumberland Plateau, Walden Ridge is also part of the Appalachian Plateau physiographic province. To the east of Walden Ridge are the Ridge-and-valley Appalachians and the Tennessee River. Walden Ridge is significantly higher than the Cumberland Plateau, and its eastern slope, descending over 1,000 feet (300 m) from the plateau to the Tennessee Valley, is steep and escarpment-like. Geologically, Walden Ridge continues south into Georgia and Alabama as Sand Mountain. Walden Ridge originally extended across the present path of the Tennessee River to Sand Mountain but was eroded when the Tennessee River Gorge was formed.

== History ==
According to the USGS, variant names of Walden Ridge include Waldens Ridge, Walldenns Ridge, Wallens Ridge, Walden's Ridge, and Walden Ridge Plateau.
