= Marion County Airport (Tennessee) =

Marion County Airport Brown Field
- IATA: APT; ICAO: KAPT; FAA LID: APT

Summary
- Airport type: Public
- Owner: Marion County
- Serves: Jasper, Tennessee
- Elevation AMSL: 641 ft / 195 m
- Coordinates: 35°03′38″N 085°35′07″W

Map
- Location of airport in Tennessee APT (the United States)

Runways
Direction	Length		Surface
Direction	ft	m	Surface
4/22	3,500	1,067	Asphalt

Statistics (2009)
- Aircraft operations: 4,480
- Based aircraft: 12
- Source: Federal Aviation Administration

Marion County Airport (IATA: APT, ICAO: KAPT, FAA LID: APT), also known as Brown Field, is a county-owned, public-use airport located four nautical miles (7 km) southeast of the central business district of Jasper, a town in Marion County, Tennessee, United States.

== Facilities and aircraft ==
Marion County Airport covers an area of 86 acres (35 ha) at an elevation of 641 feet (195 m) above mean sea level. It has one runway designated 4/22 with an asphalt surface measuring 3,500 by 75 feet (1,067 x 23 m).

For the 12-month period ending June 25, 2009, the airport had 4,480 aircraft operations, an average of 12 per day: 98% general aviation and 2% military. At that time there were 12 aircraft based at this airport: 92% single-engine and 8% helicopter.

== See also ==
- List of airports in Tennessee
