= Jasper, Tennessee =

Town in Marion County, Tennessee

Jasper
- Town
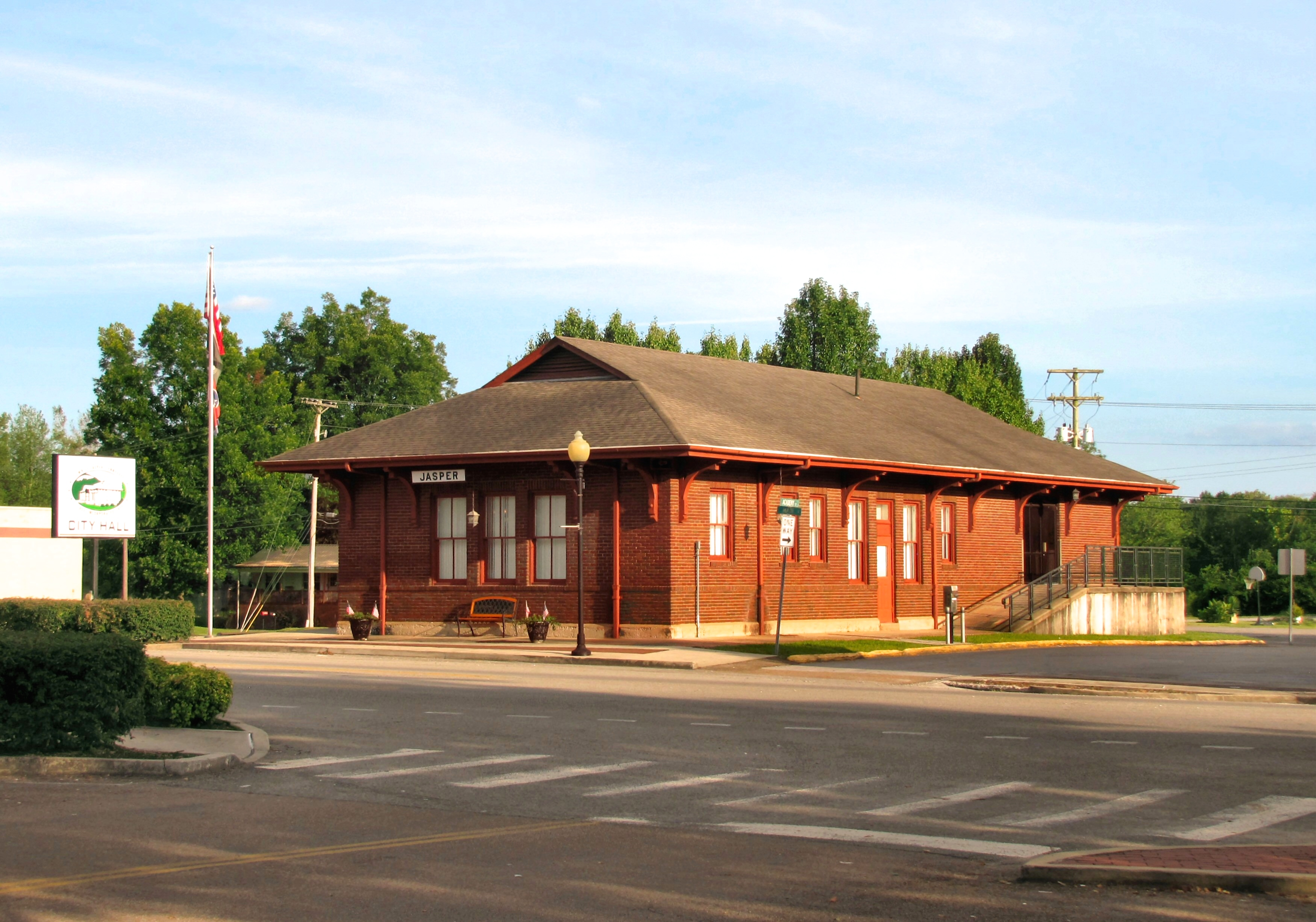
- Jasper City Hall
- Nickname: "Gateway to the beautiful Sequatchie Valley"
- Motto: "The friendly city on the move!"
- Location of Jasper in Marion County, Tennessee.

- Location of Jasper in Tennessee
- Coordinates: 35°04′30″N 85°37′41″W
- Country: United States
- State: Tennessee
- County: Marion
- Founded: 1820
- Incorporated: 1959
- Named for: William Jasper

Area
  - Total: 9.95 sq mi (25.78 km^{2})
  - Land: 9.85 sq mi (25.50 km^{2})
  - Water: 0.11 sq mi (0.28 km^{2})
- Elevation: 620 ft (190 m)

Population (2020)
  - Total: 3,612
  - Density: 366.8/sq mi (141.64/km^{2})
- Time zone: UTC-6 (Central (CST))
  - Summer (DST): UTC-5 (CDT)
- ZIP code: 37347
- Area code: 423
- FIPS code: 47-37820
- GNIS feature ID: 1289309
- Website: www.jasper-tn.com

Jasper is a town in and the county seat of Marion County, Tennessee, United States. The population was 3,612 at the 2020 census. The town was formed in 1820 from lands acquired from Betsy Pack, daughter of Cherokee Chief John Lowery. Jasper is part of the Chattanooga metropolitan area.

== History ==
Jasper is named for William Jasper, a Revolutionary War hero from South Carolina.

The town was established on land leased for $1 from Elizabeth "Betsy" Pack, daughter of Chief John Lowery and the esteemed Cherokee woman Nannie Watts. Descendants and friends of the family gather semi-annually to place flowers at the courthouse marker. The town's main north-south street, which follows a section of Tennessee State Route 150, has been named in her honor.

== Geography ==
According to the United States Census Bureau, the town has a total area of 9.2 square miles (24 km^{2}), of which 9.0 square miles (23 km^{2}) is land and 0.1 square miles (0.26 km^{2}) (1.42%) is water. The town lies in the southwestern Sequatchie Valley in a relatively flat area surrounded by steep escarpments of the Cumberland Plateau on the north and west, low hills on the east, and Guntersville Lake (part of the Tennessee River) on the south. The Sequatchie River flows just east of the town, and empties into the Tennessee River at the town's southeastern boundary. Kimball borders Jasper to the southwest.

Jasper's courthouse square lies at the intersection of U.S. Route 72 (Main Street) and Tennessee State Route 150 (Betsy Pack Drive). US-72 (which runs concurrently with U.S. Route 64 and U.S. Route 41 in Jasper) connects the town with Chattanooga to the southeast and Kimball, South Pittsburg, and Alabama to the southwest. State Route 150 connects Jasper with the Grundy County area atop the Plateau to the northwest. Tennessee State Route 28, part of the primary north-south corridor in the Sequatchie Valley, intersects US-72 in southeastern Jasper. Interstate 24 passes through Jasper's southern outskirts.

== Demographics ==
Historical population
Census	Pop.	Note	%±
1860	249		—
1870	375		50.6%
1880	541		44.3%
1890	902		66.7%
1920	728		—
1930	1,251		71.8%
1960	1,450		—
1970	2,009		38.6%
1980	2,633		31.1%
1990	2,780		5.6%
2000	3,214		15.6%
2010	3,279		2.0%
2020	3,612		10.2%

=== 2020 census ===
As of the 2020 census, Jasper had a population of 3,612. The median age was 42.7 years. 21.5% of residents were under the age of 18 and 20.5% of residents were 65 years of age or older. For every 100 females there were 92.7 males, and for every 100 females age 18 and over there were 87.5 males age 18 and over.

0.0% of residents lived in urban areas, while 100.0% lived in rural areas.

There were 1,488 households in Jasper, of which 29.0% had children under the age of 18 living in them. Of all households, 45.0% were married-couple households, 17.0% were households with a male householder and no spouse or partner present, and 31.6% were households with a female householder and no spouse or partner present. About 29.5% of all households were made up of individuals and 15.5% had someone living alone who was 65 years of age or older. There were 906 families residing in the town.

There were 1,618 housing units, of which 8.0% were vacant. The homeowner vacancy rate was 1.4% and the rental vacancy rate was 7.2%.

Jasper racial composition
Race	Number	Percentage
White (non-Hispanic)	3,066	84.88%
Black or African American (non-Hispanic)	245	6.78%
Native American	7	0.19%
Asian	16	0.44%
Other/Mixed	187	5.18%
Hispanic or Latino	91	2.52%

=== 2000 census ===
As of the census of 2000, there were 3,214 people, 1,299 households, and 928 families residing in the town. The population density was 355.7 inhabitants per square mile (137.3/km^{2}). There were 1,393 housing units at an average density of 154.2 per square mile (59.5/km^{2}). The racial makeup of the town was 90.39% White, 7.34% African American, 0.31% Native American, 0.65% Asian, 0.03% Pacific Islander, 0.19% from other races, and 1.09% from two or more races. Hispanic or Latino of any race were 1.21% of the population.

There were 1,299 households, out of which 28.9% had children under the age of 18 living with them, 55.9% were married couples living together, 12.4% had a female householder with no husband present, and 28.5% were non-families. 25.9% of all households were made up of individuals, and 11.6% had someone living alone who was 65 years of age or older. The average household size was 2.40 and the average family size was 2.87.

In the town, the population was spread out, with 22.5% under the age of 18, 8.3% from 18 to 24, 28.1% from 25 to 44, 25.9% from 45 to 64, and 15.3% who were 65 years of age or older. The median age was 39 years. For every 100 females, there were 92.9 males. For every 100 females age 18 and over, there were 89.3 males.

The median income for a household in the town was $35,926, and the median income for a family was $42,467. Males had a median income of $32,500 versus $26,250 for females. The per capita income for the town was $18,311. About 11.4% of families and 15.3% of the population were below the poverty line, including 24.8% of those under age 18 and 4.0% of those age 65 or over.

== Transportation ==
Marion County Airport, also known as Brown Field, is a county-owned, public-use airport located just over four and a half miles (7.2 km) southeast of the central business district of Jasper.

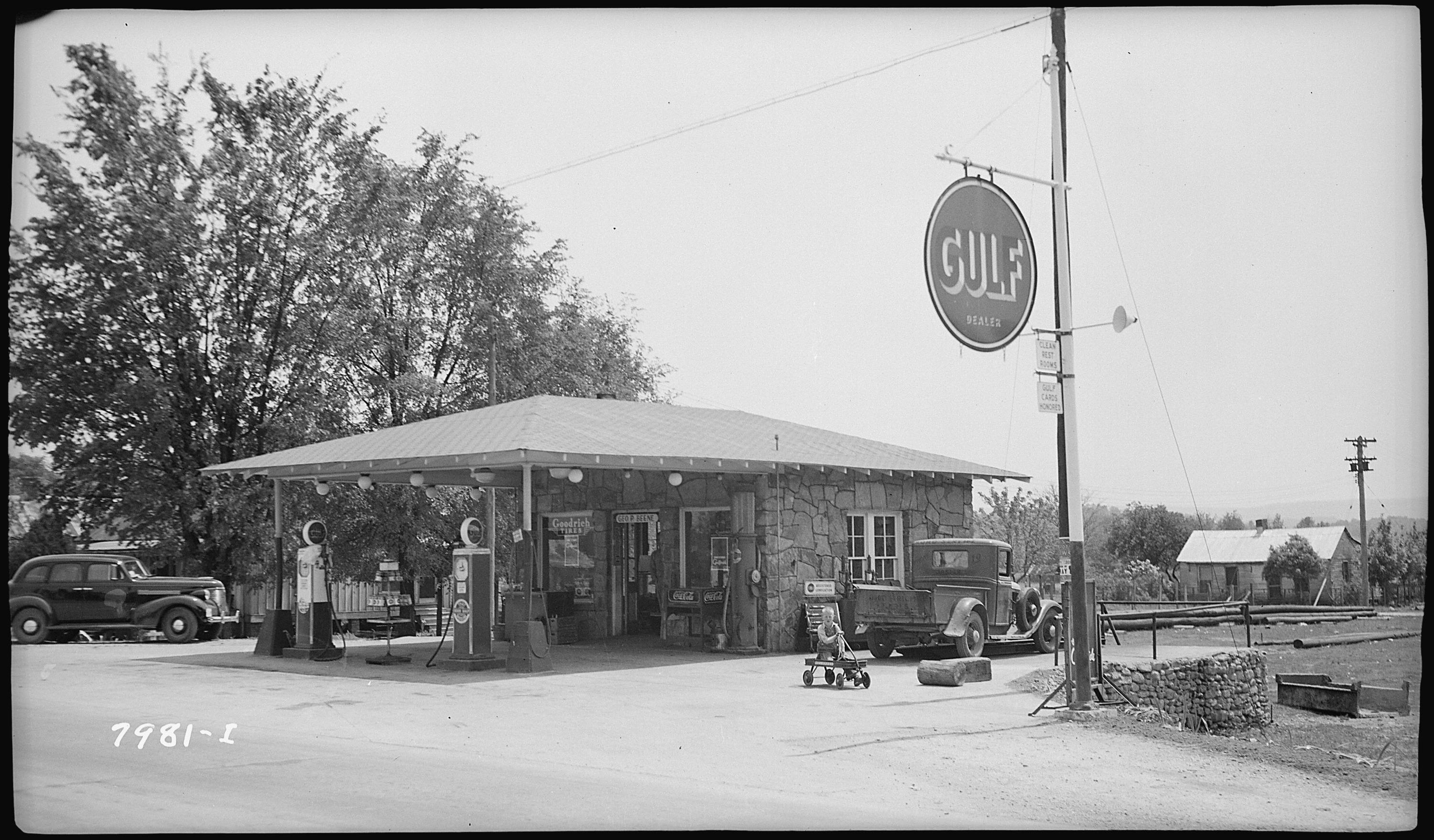
Gulf filling station, Jasper, TN, ca. 1929

== Notable people ==
- Bob Long, professional baseball player
- Eric Westmoreland, former member of the University of Tennessee Volunteers football team; former National Football League (NFL) linebacker for the Jacksonville Jaguars and Cleveland Browns
- Jacob Saylors, professional running back and kick returner for the Detroit Lions of the National Football League and former member of the St. Louis Battlehawks and East Tennessee State Buccaneers football.
