= Devilstep Hollow Cave =

Cave in Tennessee, United States

Coordinates: 35°47′46″N 85°0′31″W

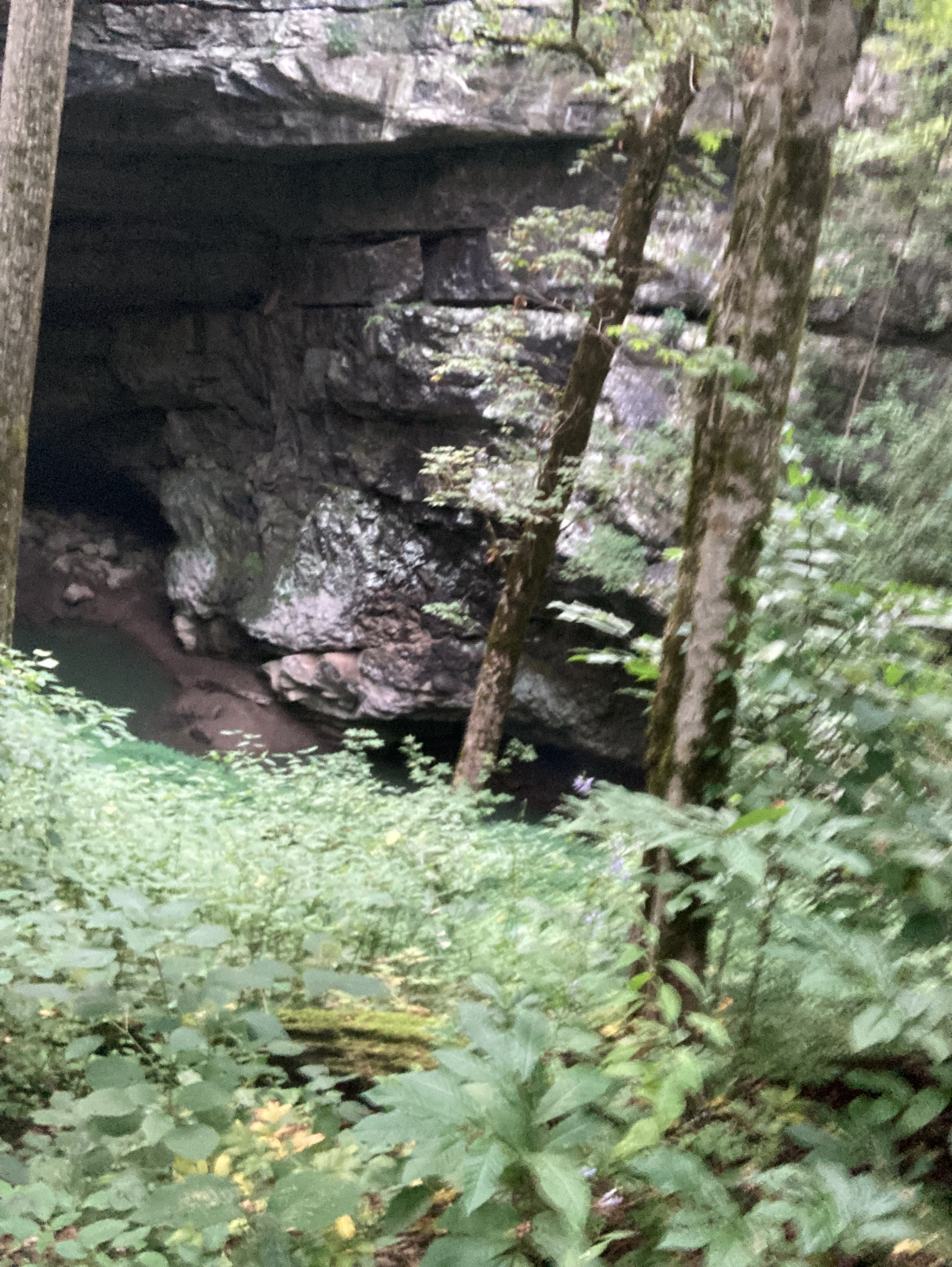
The cave entrance

Devilstep Hollow Cave is a natural limestone cave located within Justin P. Wilson Cumberland Trail State Park. The cave, part of the Mill Cave System, drains Grassy Cove, which is the largest sinkhole in North America. It contains numerous instances of Mississippian era Native American cave art. The entrance is 125 feet by 150 feet. The cave stream forms the nearby Head of Sequatchie spring, the source of the Sequatchie River.

== Artwork ==
The artwork within Devilstep Hollow Cave was created by the Mississippian culture, and contains 22 known images. These include woodpeckers, fish, and an image of the falcon man. The glyphs are thought to be around 1,100 years old.

== See also ==
- List of caves
