= Sequatchie County School District =

School district in Tennessee, United States

Sequatchie Country School District

Location
- 878 Cordell Dr; Dunlap, Tennessee United States
- Coordinates: 35.357°N 85.402°W

District information
- Type: Public
- Grades: PK-12
- Superintendent: Sarai Pierce
- Schools: 3

Students and staff
- Athletic conference: TSSAA

Other information
- Website: sequatchieschools.net

Sequatchie County School District is a school system based in Dunlap, Tennessee. The system serves three schools.

== Schools ==
=== High schools ===
- Sequatchie County High School

=== Middle school ===
- Sequatchie County Middle School

=== Elementary schools ===
- Griffith Elementary School

== See also ==
- Dunlap, Tennessee#Schools
