= Sequatchie County High School =

Location
- 523 Highway 28; Dunlap, Tennessee 37327; United States
- Coordinates: 35.357°N 85.403°W

Information
- Other name: SCHS
- Type: Public high school
- School district: Sequatchie County School Board
- NCES School ID: 470375001544
- Principal: Regina Belknap
- Teaching staff: 46.83 (on an FTE basis)
- Grades: 9–12
- Enrollment: 586 (2023–2024)
- Student to teacher ratio: 12.51
- Colors: Purple; Gold
- Athletics conference: TSSAA
- Mascot: Indian
- Nickname: Indians
- Website: schs.sequatchieschools.net

Sequatchie County High School (SCHS) is a public high school in Dunlap, Tennessee, United States. It is part of the Sequatchie County School District.

== Athletics ==
SCHS plays in the TSSAA's in the east division and 3rd athletic district. The school competes in baseball, basketball, cheerleading, cross country, football, golf, soccer, softball, tennis, track and field, volleyball, and wrestling. The school plays as the Indians and Lady Indians.

Team State Titles as of 2026
| Year | Sport | Class | Award | Details |
|---|---|---|---|---|
| 1973 | Football | A | Runner-Up | |
| 1990 | Softball | AA | Champions | (20-6) |

Individual State Titles as of 2026
| Year | Sports | Class | Award | Details / Names |
|---|---|---|---|---|
| 2011 | Boys' Track and Field | A-AA | Triple Jump Champion | Hunter Lewis |
| 2015 | Girls' Wrestling | | 112 Weight Class Champion | Katie Brock |
| 2016 | Girls' Wrestling | | 105 Weight Class Champion | Katie Brock |
| 2019 | Girls' Cross Country | Small | Runner-Up | Emma Bradford |
| 2020 | Boys' Cross Country | Small | Runner-Up | Grayson Kennedy |
| 2021 | Boys' Track and Field | Small | 1600 Meter Run Champion | Carter Bradford |
| 2022 | Boys' Track and Field | A | 1600 Meter Run Champion | Carter Bradford |
