= Sequatchie Valley =

Valley in Tennessee, United States of America

Coordinates: 35°7′30″N 85°31′44″W

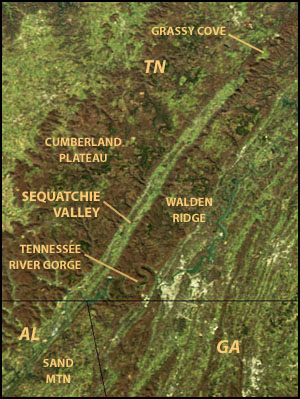
NASA satellite image showing Tennessee's Sequatchie Valley and the Cumberland Plateau (image source: Aqua satellite, MODIS sensor).

Sequatchie Valley is a relatively long and narrow valley in the U.S. state of Tennessee and, in some definitions, Alabama. It is generally considered to be part of the Cumberland Plateau region of the Appalachian Mountains; it was probably formed by erosion of a compression anticline, rather than rifting process as had been formerly theorized.

The Sequatchie River drains the valley in Tennessee, flowing south to southwest from the southern part of Cumberland County, Tennessee to the Tennessee River near the Alabama border.

Geologically, the Sequatchie Valley continues south of the Tennessee River into central Alabama. The Tennessee River flows through the Alabama portion of the valley to the vicinity of Guntersville, Alabama. The valley continues south of Guntersville, where it is called Browns Valley, drained by Browns Creek (Thornbury 1965:148). Although this whole valley is geologically the same, the name Sequatchie is commonly used only for the Tennessee portion of the valley, through which the Sequatchie River flows.

A distinctive feature of the Sequatchie Valley is its straightness. From its northern end to its geological southern end at Browns Valley, the valley is almost perfectly straight. It is over 150 miles (240 km) long in the geologic sense and about 65 miles (105 km) long as the valley of the Sequatchie River. Its width is about 3–5 miles (5–8 km).

The valley is bounded on either side by escarpments of the Cumberland Plateau. The portion of the plateau east of the valley is relatively narrow and known as Walden Ridge in Tennessee. To the west the plateau is simply called the Cumberland Plateau. In Bledsoe County, Tennessee a section of the west side escarpment is called Little Mountain, which also marks the Tennessee Valley Divide. In Alabama the plateau to the east of the valley is called Sand Mountain, while that to the west is Gunters Mountain.

At its northern end, the Sequatchie Valley is marked by a more mountainous portion of the Cumberland Plateau known as the Crab Orchard Mountains. Between the main Crab Orchard Mountains and the Sequatchie Valley there is another valley, called Grassy Cove, located several miles north of Sequatchie Valley. Grassy Cove is a karst valley which, through underground erosion, should eventually become part of Sequatchie Valley (Thornbury 1965:149). Another, smaller karst valley, Bat Town Cove, is forming northeast of Grassy Cove, which may also grow and eventually become part of Sequatchie Valley.

The Tennessee section of Sequatchie Valley contains the towns of Pikeville, Dunlap, Whitwell, Jasper, and, on the Tennessee River, South Pittsburg. Towns in the Alabama portion of the geologic valley include Bridgeport, Scottsboro, Guntersville, and, around the southern end, Blountsville.

== See also ==
- Dunlap Coke Ovens

== Notes and references ==
- Thornbury, William D. Regional Geomorphology of the United States. John Wiley & Sons, New York, 1965.
- U.S. Geological Survey Geographic Names Information System: Sequatchie Valley, Sequatchie Valley
- U.S. Geological Survey Geographic Names Information System: Sequatchie Valley, Browns Valley
