= Justin P. Wilson Cumberland Trail State Park =

Hiking trail in Tennessee, United States

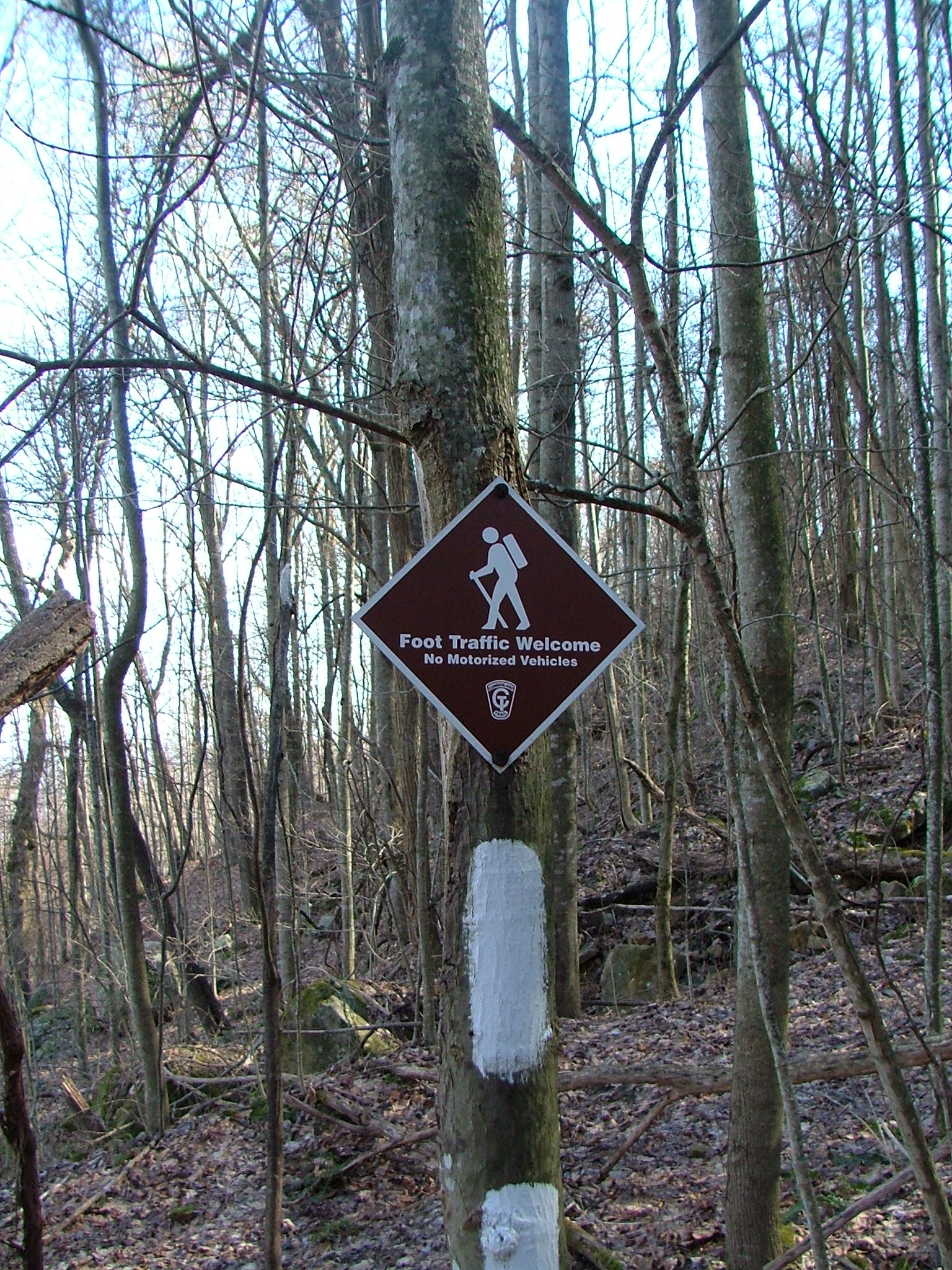
- A typical trail sign on the New River segment

- Location within Tennessee
- Type: Tennessee State Park
- Location: Pikeville, Tennessee (main office)
- Coordinates: 36°18′42″N 84°12′49″W
- Operator: TDEC
- Website: Justin P. Wilson Cumberland Trail State Park

The Justin P. Wilson Cumberland Trail State Park, commonly known as the Cumberland Trail, is a Tennessee hiking trail and state park following a line of ridges and gorges along the eastern escarpment of the Cumberland Plateau and Cumberland Mountains in Tennessee. The trail begins at Cumberland Gap National Historical Park and ends at Chickamauga and Chattanooga National Military Park and Prentice Cooper Wildlife Management Area just outside Chattanooga, Tennessee. The trail travels through 11 Tennessee counties and two time zones.

== History ==
The Cumberland Trail became Tennessee's 53rd state park in 1998 and the state's only linear park. The park is named for Justin P. Wilson in honor of his work to help make the vision of the Cumberland Trail a reality. Wilson served as the commissioner of the Tennessee Department of Environment and Conservation in 1996 and deputy governor for policy for former Tennessee Governor Don Sundquist. As of 2014 he is Comptroller of the State of Tennessee, an attorney, longtime Republican Party and conservation activist.

== The Trail ==
When completed, the Justin P. Wilson Cumberland Trail State Park is to contain a core corridor of trail stretching from Cumberland Gap National Historical Park to Signal Point Chattanooga. The Cumberland Trail is designed for hikers by hikers as a sustainable single file back country hiking trail, through more remote areas of the [Eastern Edge of the Cumberland Plateau]. An alternative to the relatively crowded Appalachian Trail. it gives hikers access to areas preserved for their natural or scenic beauty, providing a wilderness experience rare in the eastern US. The rugged trail follows numerous sparsely populated ridge lines where the trail designers have strategically routed the trail to spectacular overlooks. The trail dips into gorges where hikers can find waterfalls and swimming holes. It is designed and built to minimize the potential environmental impact on sensitive wildlife habitat, unique aquatic or terrestrial habitats, or endangered and threatened species.

=== Route ===
Still a work-in-progress, as of November 2016, 210 mi (340 km) of trail are ready for hiking and over 300 mi (483 km) of trails are planned. Segments include: the Cumberland Mountain segment above La Follette and Jacksboro and in the Cumberland Gap National Historic Park; the Smoky Mountain segment in Campbell County; the Frozen Head segment in Morgan County; the Obed Wild and Scenic River segment in the Obed Wild and Scenic River and Catoosa Wildlife Management Area; the Grassy Cove segment on Black and Brady mountains in Cumberland County; the Rock Creek, Possum Creek, Soddy Creek, and North Chickamauga segments in Hamilton County; and the Tennessee River Gorge segment in Prentice Cooper State Forest.

== Management ==
Cumberland Trail State Park offices are located in Caryville and near Pikeville. Volunteers from all over the US and several volunteer hiking organizations are also working under direction of the Tennessee State Parks in building new sections of the trail.

A number of private organizations support the Cumberland Trail financially and with volunteer efforts. The list of supporters is long. Wild Trails, the Chattanooga nonprofit that directs money to building and maintaining wilderness path projects through the region; Break Away: the Alternative Break Connection; Lyndhurst Foundation; Anne Potter Wilson Foundation; the Cumberland Trails Conference (CTC); and the Friends of the Cumberland Trail are most active in the private sector funding, trail development, and on-the-ground construction of the Cumberland Trail. A number of other individuals and volunteer organizations are also assisting in bringing the vision of the Cumberland Trail closer to completion.

Tennessee State Parks and the Tennessee Trails Association sponsor volunteer trail building programs several times a year to build new sections of trail. The biggest of these programs is the BreakAway program. BreakAway program is an Alternative Spring Break (ASB) program managed by the Cumberland Trails Conference that allows college students to engage in volunteer services such as trail building during their spring and fall college breaks. A big portion of the 235,000 hours donated to date to construct and maintain the trail have been BreakAway students.

== Head of Sequatchie ==
The head of the Sequatchie River is located in the park near Pikeville. The park's main office and visitor center are also located at the Head of Sequatchie. In addition, this area contains Devilstep Hollow Cave.

== See also ==
- List of Tennessee state parks
- StumpJump 50k
