= Chattanooga–Cleveland–Dalton combined statistical area =

Chattanooga Metropolitan Area Chattanooga–Cleveland–Dalton, TN–GA–AL Combined Statistical Area
- Combined Statistical Area
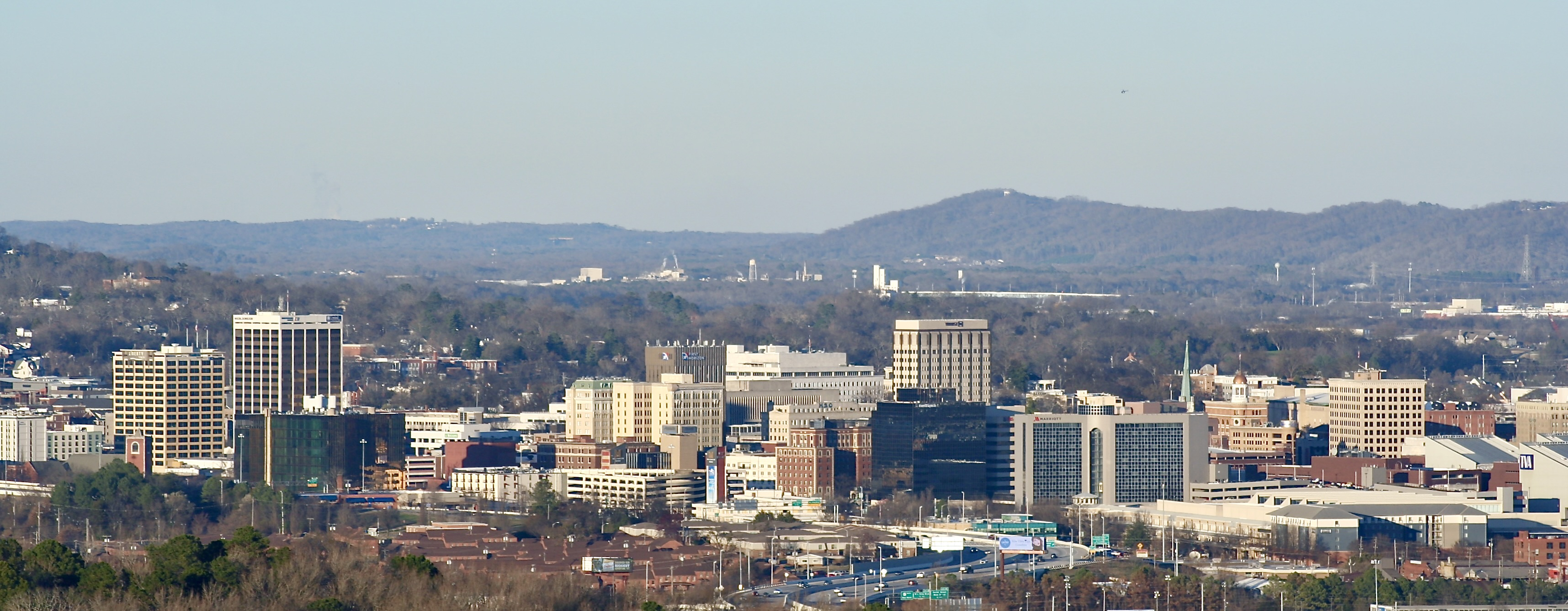
- Chattanooga Skyline in 2023
Chattanooga–Cleveland–Dalton, TN–GA–AL CSA
City of Chattanooga
Chattanooga, TN–GA MSA
Dalton, GA MSA
Cleveland, TN MSA
Athens, TN µSA
Scottsboro, AL µSA
Summerville, GA µSA
- Country: United States
- State: Tennessee; Georgia; Alabama
- Largest city: Chattanooga

Area
  - Land: 5,500 sq mi (14,000 km^{2})

Population (2023)
  - Total: 1,003,363

GDP
  - CSA: $58.621 billion (2022)
- Time zone: UTC−5 (EST)
  - Summer (DST): UTC−4 (EDT)

The Chattanooga–Cleveland–Dalton, TN–GA–AL Combined Statistical Area covers a total of fourteen counties – seven in southeast Tennessee, six in northwest Georgia and one in northeast Alabama. The combined statistical area consists of three metropolitan statistical areas – Chattanooga, Cleveland, and Dalton – as well as the Athens, Scottsboro, and Summerville micropolitan statistical areas. At the 2025 estimate, the CSA had a population of 1,027,577.

== Counties ==
- Bradley County, Tennessee
- Rhea County, Tennessee
- Hamilton County, Tennessee
- Marion County, Tennessee
- McMinn County, Tennessee
- Meigs County, Tennessee
- Polk County, Tennessee
- Sequatchie County, Tennessee
- Catoosa County, Georgia
- Chattooga County, Georgia
- Dade County, Georgia
- Murray County, Georgia
- Walker County, Georgia
- Whitfield County, Georgia
- Jackson County, Alabama

== Communities ==
=== Places with more than 150,000 inhabitants ===
- Chattanooga, Tennessee (principal city)

=== Places with 20,000 to 50,000 inhabitants ===
- Cleveland, Tennessee (principal city)
- Dalton, Georgia (principal city)
- East Ridge, Tennessee

=== Places with 10,000 to 20,000 inhabitants ===
- Athens, Tennessee (principal city)
- Collegedale, Tennessee
- Middle Valley, Tennessee (CDP)
- Red Bank, Tennessee
- Soddy-Daisy, Tennessee
- Fort Oglethorpe, Georgia

=== Places with 5,000 to 10,000 inhabitants ===
- Dayton, Tennessee
- Fairview, Georgia (CDP)
- Harrison, Tennessee (CDP)
- LaFayette, Georgia
- Signal Mountain, Tennessee
- Dunlap, Tennessee
- South Cleveland, Tennessee (CDP)

=== Places with 1,000 to 5,000 inhabitants ===
- Apison, Tennessee (CDP)
- Benton, Tennessee
- Riceville, Tennessee (CDP)
- Chattanooga Valley, Georgia (CDP)
- Chatsworth, Georgia
- Chickamauga, Georgia
- East Cleveland, Tennessee (CDP)
- Englewood, Tennessee
- Etowah, Tennessee
- Fairmount, Tennessee (CDP)
- Falling Water, Tennessee (CDP)
- Graysville, Tennessee
- Hopewell, Tennessee (CDP)
- Indian Springs, Georgia (CDP)
- Jasper, Tennessee
- Kimball, Tennessee
- Lakesite, Tennessee
- Lakeview, Georgia (CDP)
- Lone Oak, Tennessee (CDP)
- Lookout Mountain, Georgia
- Lookout Mountain, Tennessee
- Monteagle, Tennessee (partial)
- Mowbray Mountain, Tennessee (CDP)
- Powells Crossroads, Tennessee
- Ringgold, Georgia
- Rossville, Georgia
- Sale Creek, Tennessee (CDP)
- South Pittsburg, Tennessee
- Spring City, Tennessee
- Trenton, Georgia
- Varnell, Georgia
- Walden, Tennessee
- Whitwell, Tennessee
- Wildwood Lake, Tennessee (CDP)

=== Places with less than 1,000 inhabitants ===
- Calhoun, Tennessee
- Charleston, Tennessee
- Cohutta, Georgia
- Copperhill, Tennessee
- Tunnel Hill, Georgia
- Ducktown, Tennessee
- Eton, Georgia
- Flat Top Mountain, Tennessee (CDP)
- Niota, Tennessee
- Fairmount, Georgia
- Ooltewah, Tennessee (CDP)
- Orme, Tennessee
- Ridgeside, Tennessee
- New Hope, Tennessee

=== Other unincorporated places ===
- Bakewell, Tennessee
- Birchwood, Tennessee
- Carters, Georgia
- Cisco, Georgia
- Crandall, Georgia
- Delano, Tennessee
- Dennis, Georgia
- East Brainerd, Tennessee
- Farner, Tennessee
- Georgetown, Tennessee (partial)
- Hixson, Tennessee
- Kensington, Georgia
- McDonald, Tennessee
- Ocoee, Tennessee
- Old Fort, Tennessee
- Reliance, Tennessee
- Rocky Face, Georgia
- Rising Fawn, Georgia
- Ten Mile, Tennessee
- Tennga, Georgia
- Tilton, Georgia
- Turtletown, Tennessee
- Wildwood, Georgia

== See also ==
- Tennessee statistical areas
- List of municipalities in Tennessee
- Georgia statistical areas
- List of municipalities in Georgia
