= Chattanooga metropolitan area =

Metropolitan area in Tennessee and Georgia, United States

Chattanooga Area
- Metropolitan Statistical Area
- Chattanooga, TN-GA Metropolitan Statistical Area
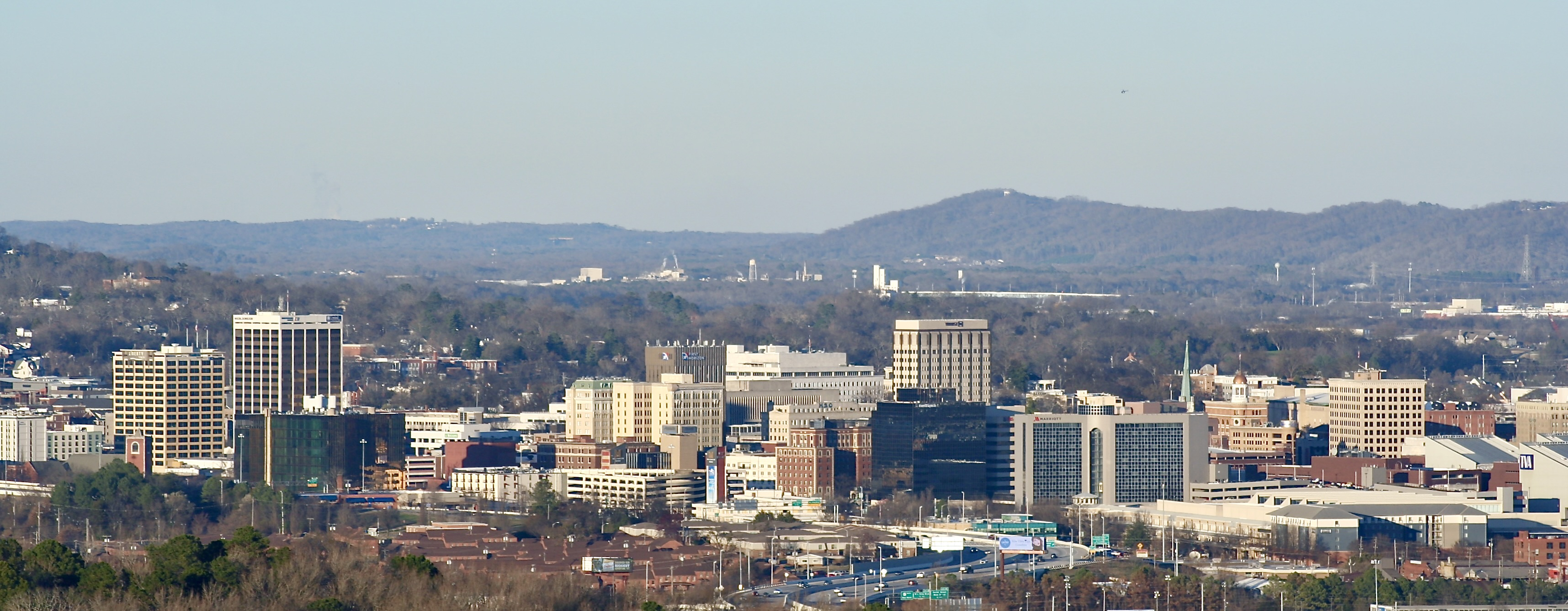
- Chattanooga Skyline in 2023
Chattanooga–Cleveland–Dalton, TN–GA–AL CSA
City of Chattanooga
Chattanooga, TN–GA MSA
Dalton, GA MSA
Cleveland, TN MSA
Athens, TN µSA
Scottsboro, AL µSA
Summerville, GA µSA
- Country: United States
- State: Tennessee; Georgia; Alabama
- Largest city: Chattanooga

Area
  - Total: 2,089 sq mi (5,410 km^{2})

Population (2022)
  - Total: 574,507 ▲
  - Rank: 99th (2020) in the U.S.

GDP
  - Total: $40.042 billion (2022)
- Time zone: UTC−5 (EST)
  - Summer (DST): UTC−4 (EDT)

The Chattanooga, TN–GA metropolitan statistical area, as defined by the United States Office of Management and Budget, is an area consisting of six counties – three in southeast Tennessee (Hamilton, Marion, and Sequatchie) and three in northwest Georgia (Catoosa, Dade, and Walker) – anchored by the city of Chattanooga. As of the 2020 census, the Chattanooga metropolitan area had a population of 562,647. This metropolitan area traverses two time zones.

== Counties ==
| County | State | Seat | 2025 estimate | 2020 census | Change | Area | Density |
|---|---|---|---|---|---|---|---|
| Hamilton | Tennessee | Chattanooga | 390,833 | 366,207 | +6.72% | 576 sq mi (1,490 km^{2}) | 679/sq mi (262/km^{2}) |
| Walker | Georgia | LaFayette | 70,250 | 67,654 | +3.84% | 447 sq mi (1,160 km^{2}) | 157/sq mi (61/km^{2}) |
| Catoosa | Georgia | Ringgold | 69,628 | 67,872 | +2.59% | 162 sq mi (420 km^{2}) | 430/sq mi (166/km^{2}) |
| Marion | Tennessee | Jasper | 29,804 | 28,837 | +3.35% | 512 sq mi (1,330 km^{2}) | 58/sq mi (22/km^{2}) |
| Sequatchie | Tennessee | Dunlap | 17,861 | 15,826 | +12.86% | 266 sq mi (690 km^{2}) | 67/sq mi (26/km^{2}) |
| Dade | Georgia | Trenton | 16,154 | 16,251 | −0.60% | 174 sq mi (450 km^{2}) | 93/sq mi (36/km^{2}) |
| Total | | | 594,530 | 562,647 | +5.67% | 2,137 sq mi (5,530 km^{2}) | 278/sq mi (107/km^{2}) |

== Communities ==
=== Places with more than 150,000 inhabitants ===
- Chattanooga, Tennessee (Principal city)

=== Places with 10,000 to 25,000 inhabitants ===
- East Brainerd, Tennessee
- East Ridge, Tennessee
- Middle Valley, Tennessee (CDP)
- Red Bank, Tennessee
- Soddy-Daisy, Tennessee
- Collegedale, Tennessee
- Fort Oglethorpe, Georgia

=== Places with 5,000 to 10,000 inhabitants ===
- Fairview, Georgia (CDP)
- Harrison, Tennessee (CDP)
- LaFayette, Georgia
- Signal Mountain, Tennessee
- Dunlap, Tennessee

=== Places with 1,000 to 5,000 inhabitants ===
- Apison, Tennessee (CDP)
- Chattanooga Valley, Georgia (CDP)
- Chickamauga, Georgia
- Fairmount, Tennessee (CDP)
- Falling Water, Tennessee (CDP)
- Indian Springs, Georgia (CDP)
- Jasper, Tennessee
- Kimball, Tennessee
- Lakesite, Tennessee
- Lakeview, Georgia
- Lookout Mountain, Georgia
- Lookout Mountain, Tennessee
- Lone Oak, Tennessee (CDP)
- Monteagle, Tennessee (partial)
- Mowbray Mountain (CDP)
- Powells Crossroads, Tennessee
- Ringgold, Georgia
- Rossville, Georgia
- Sale Creek, Tennessee (CDP)
- South Pittsburg, Tennessee
- Trenton, Georgia
- Walden, Tennessee
- Whitwell, Tennessee

=== Places with less than 1,000 inhabitants ===
- Flat Top Mountain (CDP)
- Ooltewah, Tennessee (CDP)
- Orme, Tennessee
- Ridgeside, Tennessee
- Rock Spring, Georgia
- New Hope, Tennessee
- Wildwood, Georgia (CDP)

=== Unincorporated places ===
- Bakewell, Tennessee
- Birchwood, Tennessee
- Haletown, Tennessee
- Hixson, Tennessee
- Kensington, Georgia
- Villanow, Georgia
- Rising Fawn, Georgia
- Suck Creek, Tennessee

== Demographics ==
Historical population
| Census | Pop. | Note | %± |
|---|---|---|---|
| 1900 | 82,763 | | — |
| 1910 | 113,169 | | 36.7% |
| 1920 | 139,524 | | 23.3% |
| 1930 | 185,703 | | 33.1% |
| 1940 | 211,502 | | 13.9% |
| 1950 | 246,453 | | 16.5% |
| 1960 | 339,887 | | 37.9% |
| 1970 | 370,016 | | 8.9% |
| 1980 | 426,540 | | 15.3% |
| 1990 | 433,210 | | 1.6% |
| 2000 | 476,531 | | 10.0% |
| 2010 | 528,143 | | 10.8% |
| 2020 | 562,647 | | 6.5% |
| 2023 (est.) | 580,971 | | 3.3% |

As of the census of 2010, there were 528,143 people, 189,607 households, and 132,326 families residing within the MSA. The racial makeup of the MSA was 83.14% White, 13.90% African American, 0.30% Native American, 0.97% Asian, 0.05% Pacific Islander, 0.61% from other races, and 1.03% from two or more races. Hispanic or Latino of any race were 1.49% of the population.

The median income for a household in the MSA was $44,197, and for a family was $40,841. Males had a median income of $30,985 versus $22,305 for females. The per capita income for the MSA was $17,414.

== Combined statistical area ==
The Chattanooga–Cleveland–Dalton, TN–GA–AL Combined Statistical Area is made up of six counties in southeast Tennessee, three counties in northwest Georgia, and one county in northeast Alabama. The statistical area includes the Chattanooga metropolitan statistical area, Cleveland metropolitan statistical area, and the Athens micropolitan statistical area.

== See also ==
- Tennessee census statistical areas
- List of cities and towns in Tennessee
- Georgia statistical areas
- List of municipalities in Georgia (U.S. state)
