= Tennessee statistical areas =

Coordinates: 35.8580°N 86.3505°W

The U.S. State of Tennessee currently has 34 statistical areas that have been delineated by the Office of Management and Budget (OMB). On July 21, 2023, the OMB delineated seven combined statistical areas, ten metropolitan statistical areas, and 17 micropolitan statistical areas in Tennessee. As of 2025, the largest of these is the Nashville-Davidson–Murfreesboro, TN CSA, comprising the area around the state capital of Nashville.

== Statistical areas ==
The Office of Management and Budget (OMB) has designated more than 1,000 statistical areas for the United States and Puerto Rico. These statistical areas are important geographic delineations of population clusters used by the OMB, the United States Census Bureau, planning organizations, and federal, state, and local government entities.

The OMB defines a core-based statistical area (commonly referred to as a CBSA) as the county or counties (or county-equivalents) surrounding at least one densely-settled core of at least 10,000 population, "plus adjacent counties having a high degree of social and economic integration with the core as measured through commuting ties with the counties containing the core". The OMB further divides core-based statistical areas based on population into metropolitan statistical areas (MSAs) for those with at least 50,000 and micropolitan statistical areas (μSAs) for those with 10,000 to 49,999 people.

The OMB defines a combined statistical area (CSA) as two or more adjacent core-based statistical areas where the employment interchange rate (% commuting from A to B plus % commuting from B to A) is at least 15%. The primary statistical areas (PSAs) include all combined statistical areas and any core-based statistical area that is not a constituent of a combined statistical area.

== Table ==
The 34 United States statistical areas and 95 counties of the State of Tennessee (Note: An out-of-state area and its population are displayed in green. An area that extends into more than one state is displayed in purple. A purple population number over a black population number show the total population versus the in-state population. The state's abbreviation is also shown next to the in-state total.)
Combined statistical area	2025 population (est.)	Core-based statistical area	2025 population (est.)	County	2025 population (est.)
Nashville-Davidson–Murfreesboro, TN CSA	2,452,592	Nashville-Davidson–Murfreesboro–Franklin, TN MSA	2,197,416	Davidson County, Tennessee	745,904
Nashville-Davidson–Murfreesboro, TN CSA	2,452,592	Nashville-Davidson–Murfreesboro–Franklin, TN MSA	2,197,416	Rutherford County, Tennessee	386,352
Nashville-Davidson–Murfreesboro, TN CSA	2,452,592	Nashville-Davidson–Murfreesboro–Franklin, TN MSA	2,197,416	Williamson County, Tennessee	272,061
Nashville-Davidson–Murfreesboro, TN CSA	2,452,592	Nashville-Davidson–Murfreesboro–Franklin, TN MSA	2,197,416	Sumner County, Tennessee	215,538
Nashville-Davidson–Murfreesboro, TN CSA	2,452,592	Nashville-Davidson–Murfreesboro–Franklin, TN MSA	2,197,416	Wilson County, Tennessee	175,033
Nashville-Davidson–Murfreesboro, TN CSA	2,452,592	Nashville-Davidson–Murfreesboro–Franklin, TN MSA	2,197,416	Maury County, Tennessee	118,131
Nashville-Davidson–Murfreesboro, TN CSA	2,452,592	Nashville-Davidson–Murfreesboro–Franklin, TN MSA	2,197,416	Robertson County, Tennessee	80,175
Nashville-Davidson–Murfreesboro, TN CSA	2,452,592	Nashville-Davidson–Murfreesboro–Franklin, TN MSA	2,197,416	Dickson County, Tennessee	58,662
Nashville-Davidson–Murfreesboro, TN CSA	2,452,592	Nashville-Davidson–Murfreesboro–Franklin, TN MSA	2,197,416	Cheatham County, Tennessee	42,778
Nashville-Davidson–Murfreesboro, TN CSA	2,452,592	Nashville-Davidson–Murfreesboro–Franklin, TN MSA	2,197,416	Macon County, Tennessee	27,663
Nashville-Davidson–Murfreesboro, TN CSA	2,452,592	Nashville-Davidson–Murfreesboro–Franklin, TN MSA	2,197,416	Hickman County, Tennessee	26,219
Nashville-Davidson–Murfreesboro, TN CSA	2,452,592	Nashville-Davidson–Murfreesboro–Franklin, TN MSA	2,197,416	Smith County, Tennessee	20,981
Nashville-Davidson–Murfreesboro, TN CSA	2,452,592	Nashville-Davidson–Murfreesboro–Franklin, TN MSA	2,197,416	Cannon County, Tennessee	15,296
Nashville-Davidson–Murfreesboro, TN CSA	2,452,592	Nashville-Davidson–Murfreesboro–Franklin, TN MSA	2,197,416	Trousdale County, Tennessee	12,623
Nashville-Davidson–Murfreesboro, TN CSA	2,452,592	Tullahoma–Manchester, TN μSA	69,339	Coffee County, Tennessee	62,419
Nashville-Davidson–Murfreesboro, TN CSA	2,452,592	Tullahoma–Manchester, TN μSA	69,339	Moore County, Tennessee	6,920
Nashville-Davidson–Murfreesboro, TN CSA	2,452,592	Shelbyville, TN μSA	55,273	Bedford County, Tennessee	55,273
Nashville-Davidson–Murfreesboro, TN CSA	2,452,592	Lawrenceburg, TN μSA	46,914	Lawrence County, Tennessee	46,914
Nashville-Davidson–Murfreesboro, TN CSA	2,452,592	Winchester, TN μSA	45,579	Franklin County, Tennessee	45,579
Nashville-Davidson–Murfreesboro, TN CSA	2,452,592	Lewisburg, TN μSA	38,071	Marshall County, Tennessee	38,071
Knoxville–Morristown–Sevierville, TN CSA	1,236,235	Knoxville, TN MSA	968,137	Knox County, Tennessee	511,453
Knoxville–Morristown–Sevierville, TN CSA	1,236,235	Knoxville, TN MSA	968,137	Blount County, Tennessee	143,820
Knoxville–Morristown–Sevierville, TN CSA	1,236,235	Knoxville, TN MSA	968,137	Anderson County, Tennessee	82,066
Knoxville–Morristown–Sevierville, TN CSA	1,236,235	Knoxville, TN MSA	968,137	Loudon County, Tennessee	63,764
Knoxville–Morristown–Sevierville, TN CSA	1,236,235	Knoxville, TN MSA	968,137	Roane County, Tennessee	57,395
Knoxville–Morristown–Sevierville, TN CSA	1,236,235	Knoxville, TN MSA	968,137	Campbell County, Tennessee	40,290
Knoxville–Morristown–Sevierville, TN CSA	1,236,235	Knoxville, TN MSA	968,137	Grainger County, Tennessee	25,739
Knoxville–Morristown–Sevierville, TN CSA	1,236,235	Knoxville, TN MSA	968,137	Morgan County, Tennessee	22,160
Knoxville–Morristown–Sevierville, TN CSA	1,236,235	Knoxville, TN MSA	968,137	Union County, Tennessee	21,450
Knoxville–Morristown–Sevierville, TN CSA	1,236,235	Morristown, TN MSA	128,867	Hamblen County, Tennessee	68,843
Knoxville–Morristown–Sevierville, TN CSA	1,236,235	Morristown, TN MSA	128,867	Jefferson County, Tennessee	60,024
Knoxville–Morristown–Sevierville, TN CSA	1,236,235	Sevierville, TN μSA	101,342	Sevier County, Tennessee	101,342
Knoxville–Morristown–Sevierville, TN CSA	1,236,235	Newport, TN μSA	37,889	Cocke County, Tennessee	37,889
Memphis–Forrest City, TN-MS-AR CSA	1,383,061; 1,017,584 (TN)	Memphis, TN-MS-AR MSA	1,341,412; 1,017,584 (TN)	Shelby County, Tennessee	910,226
Memphis–Forrest City, TN-MS-AR CSA	1,383,061; 1,017,584 (TN)	Memphis, TN-MS-AR MSA	1,341,412; 1,017,584 (TN)	DeSoto County, Mississippi	197,918
Memphis–Forrest City, TN-MS-AR CSA	1,383,061; 1,017,584 (TN)	Memphis, TN-MS-AR MSA	1,341,412; 1,017,584 (TN)	Tipton County, Tennessee	62,287
Memphis–Forrest City, TN-MS-AR CSA	1,383,061; 1,017,584 (TN)	Memphis, TN-MS-AR MSA	1,341,412; 1,017,584 (TN)	Crittenden County, Arkansas	46,210
Memphis–Forrest City, TN-MS-AR CSA	1,383,061; 1,017,584 (TN)	Memphis, TN-MS-AR MSA	1,341,412; 1,017,584 (TN)	Fayette County, Tennessee	45,071
Memphis–Forrest City, TN-MS-AR CSA	1,383,061; 1,017,584 (TN)	Memphis, TN-MS-AR MSA	1,341,412; 1,017,584 (TN)	Marshall County, Mississippi	34,654
Memphis–Forrest City, TN-MS-AR CSA	1,383,061; 1,017,584 (TN)	Memphis, TN-MS-AR MSA	1,341,412; 1,017,584 (TN)	Tate County, Mississippi	28,725
Memphis–Forrest City, TN-MS-AR CSA	1,383,061; 1,017,584 (TN)	Memphis, TN-MS-AR MSA	1,341,412; 1,017,584 (TN)	Tunica County, Mississippi	8,819
Memphis–Forrest City, TN-MS-AR CSA	1,383,061; 1,017,584 (TN)	Memphis, TN-MS-AR MSA	1,341,412; 1,017,584 (TN)	Benton County, Mississippi	7,502
Memphis–Forrest City, TN-MS-AR CSA	1,383,061; 1,017,584 (TN)	Forrest City, AR μSA	21,800	St. Francis County, Arkansas	21,800
Memphis–Forrest City, TN-MS-AR CSA	1,383,061; 1,017,584 (TN)	Clarksdale, MS μSA	19,849	Coahoma County, Mississippi	19,849
Chattanooga–Cleveland–Dalton, TN-GA-AL CSA	1,027,577; 644,145 (TN)	Chattanooga, TN-GA MSA	594,530; 438,498 (TN)	Hamilton County, Tennessee	390,833
Chattanooga–Cleveland–Dalton, TN-GA-AL CSA	1,027,577; 644,145 (TN)	Chattanooga, TN-GA MSA	594,530; 438,498 (TN)	Walker County, Georgia	70,250
Chattanooga–Cleveland–Dalton, TN-GA-AL CSA	1,027,577; 644,145 (TN)	Chattanooga, TN-GA MSA	594,530; 438,498 (TN)	Catoosa County, Georgia	69,628
Chattanooga–Cleveland–Dalton, TN-GA-AL CSA	1,027,577; 644,145 (TN)	Chattanooga, TN-GA MSA	594,530; 438,498 (TN)	Marion County, Tennessee	29,804
Chattanooga–Cleveland–Dalton, TN-GA-AL CSA	1,027,577; 644,145 (TN)	Chattanooga, TN-GA MSA	594,530; 438,498 (TN)	Sequatchie County, Tennessee	17,861
Chattanooga–Cleveland–Dalton, TN-GA-AL CSA	1,027,577; 644,145 (TN)	Chattanooga, TN-GA MSA	594,530; 438,498 (TN)	Dade County, Georgia	16,154
Chattanooga–Cleveland–Dalton, TN-GA-AL CSA	1,027,577; 644,145 (TN)	Dalton, GA MSA	147,819	Murray County, Georgia	41,607
Chattanooga–Cleveland–Dalton, TN-GA-AL CSA	1,027,577; 644,145 (TN)	Dalton, GA MSA	147,819	Whitfield County, Georgia	106,212
Chattanooga–Cleveland–Dalton, TN-GA-AL CSA	1,027,577; 644,145 (TN)	Cleveland, TN MSA	134,057	Bradley County, Tennessee	115,465
Chattanooga–Cleveland–Dalton, TN-GA-AL CSA	1,027,577; 644,145 (TN)	Cleveland, TN MSA	134,057	Polk County, Tennessee	18,592
Chattanooga–Cleveland–Dalton, TN-GA-AL CSA	1,027,577; 644,145 (TN)	Athens, TN μSA	71,590	McMinn County, Tennessee	57,404
Chattanooga–Cleveland–Dalton, TN-GA-AL CSA	1,027,577; 644,145 (TN)	Athens, TN μSA	71,590	Meigs County, Tennessee	14,186
Chattanooga–Cleveland–Dalton, TN-GA-AL CSA	1,027,577; 644,145 (TN)	Scottsboro, AL μSA	54,281	Jackson County, Alabama	54,281
Chattanooga–Cleveland–Dalton, TN-GA-AL CSA	1,027,577; 644,145 (TN)	Summerville, GA μSA	25,300	Chattooga County, Georgia	25,300
Johnson City–Kingsport–Bristol, TN-VA CSA	605,081; 513,565 (TN)	Kingsport–Bristol, TN-VA MSA	314,834; 223,318 (TN)	Sullivan County, Tennessee	163,759
Johnson City–Kingsport–Bristol, TN-VA CSA	605,081; 513,565 (TN)	Kingsport–Bristol, TN-VA MSA	314,834; 223,318 (TN)	Hawkins County, Tennessee	59,559
Johnson City–Kingsport–Bristol, TN-VA CSA	605,081; 513,565 (TN)	Kingsport–Bristol, TN-VA MSA	314,834; 223,318 (TN)	Washington County, Virginia	53,898
Johnson City–Kingsport–Bristol, TN-VA CSA	605,081; 513,565 (TN)	Kingsport–Bristol, TN-VA MSA	314,834; 223,318 (TN)	Scott County, Virginia	21,200
Johnson City–Kingsport–Bristol, TN-VA CSA	605,081; 513,565 (TN)	Kingsport–Bristol, TN-VA MSA	314,834; 223,318 (TN)	City of Bristol, Virginia	16,418
Johnson City–Kingsport–Bristol, TN-VA CSA	605,081; 513,565 (TN)	Johnson City, TN MSA	216,416	Washington County, Tennessee	141,199
Johnson City–Kingsport–Bristol, TN-VA CSA	605,081; 513,565 (TN)	Johnson City, TN MSA	216,416	Carter County, Tennessee	57,361
Johnson City–Kingsport–Bristol, TN-VA CSA	605,081; 513,565 (TN)	Johnson City, TN MSA	216,416	Unicoi County, Tennessee	17,856
Johnson City–Kingsport–Bristol, TN-VA CSA	605,081; 513,565 (TN)	Greeneville, TN μSA	73,831	Greene County, Tennessee	73,831
none		Clarksville, TN-KY MSA	349,001; 264,374 (TN)	Montgomery County, Tennessee	249,935
none		Clarksville, TN-KY MSA	349,001; 264,374 (TN)	Christian County, Kentucky	70,115
none		Clarksville, TN-KY MSA	349,001; 264,374 (TN)	Trigg County, Kentucky	14,512
none		Clarksville, TN-KY MSA	349,001; 264,374 (TN)	Stewart County, Tennessee	14,439
none		Jackson, TN MSA	184,569	Madison County, Tennessee	100,790
none		Jackson, TN MSA	184,569	Gibson County, Tennessee	51,779
none		Jackson, TN MSA	184,569	Chester County, Tennessee	17,994
none		Jackson, TN MSA	184,569	Crockett County, Tennessee	14,006
none		Cookeville, TN μSA	152,477	Putnam County, Tennessee	86,612
none		Cookeville, TN μSA	152,477	White County, Tennessee	29,612
none		Cookeville, TN μSA	152,477	Overton County, Tennessee	23,787
none		Cookeville, TN μSA	152,477	Jackson County, Tennessee	12,466
none		Crossville, TN μSA	66,300	Cumberland County, Tennessee	66,300
Union City–Martin, TN CSA	63,495	Martin, TN μSA	33,261	Weakley County, Tennessee	33,261
Union City–Martin, TN CSA	63,495	Union City, TN μSA	30,067	Obion County, Tennessee	30,067
none		McMinnville, TN μSA	43,717	Warren County, Tennessee	43,717
none		Dyersburg, TN μSA	36,320	Dyer County, Tennessee	36,320
Huntsville–Decatur–Albertville, AL-TN CSA	931,245; 36,853 (TN)	Huntsville, AL, MSA	556,444	Madison County, Alabama	433,516
Huntsville–Decatur–Albertville, AL-TN CSA	931,245; 36,853 (TN)	Huntsville, AL, MSA	556,444	Limestone County, Alabama	122,928
Huntsville–Decatur–Albertville, AL-TN CSA	931,245; 36,853 (TN)	Decatur, AL, MSA	160,326	Morgan County, Alabama	126,483
Huntsville–Decatur–Albertville, AL-TN CSA	931,245; 36,853 (TN)	Decatur, AL, MSA	160,326	Lawrence County, Alabama	33,843
Huntsville–Decatur–Albertville, AL-TN CSA	931,245; 36,853 (TN)	Albertville, AL, μSA	103,537	Marshall County, Alabama	103,537
Huntsville–Decatur–Albertville, AL-TN CSA	931,245; 36,853 (TN)	Fort Payne, AL, μSA	74,085	DeKalb County, Alabama	74,085
Huntsville–Decatur–Albertville, AL-TN CSA	931,245; 36,853 (TN)	Fayetteville, TN μSA	36,853	Lincoln County, Tennessee	36,853
none		Paris, TN μSA	32,896	Henry County, Tennessee	32,896
none		none		Monroe County, Tennessee	49,730
none		none		Rhea County, Tennessee	34,844
none		none		Claiborne County, Tennessee	33,229
none		none		Giles County, Tennessee	31,433
none		none		Carroll County, Tennessee	29,200
none		none		Henderson County, Tennessee	28,518
none		none		Hardin County, Tennessee	27,983
none		none		McNairy County, Tennessee	26,236
none		none		Hardeman County, Tennessee	25,274
none		none		Lauderdale County, Tennessee	24,617
none		none		Scott County, Tennessee	22,671
none		none		DeKalb County, Tennessee	21,873
none		none		Fentress County, Tennessee	20,322
none		none		Humphreys County, Tennessee	19,646
none		none		Johnson County, Tennessee	18,718
none		none		Haywood County, Tennessee	17,042
none		none		Benton County, Tennessee	16,183
none		none		Wayne County, Tennessee	16,416
none		none		Bledsoe County, Tennessee	15,920
none		none		Grundy County, Tennessee	14,116
none		none		Lewis County, Tennessee	13,487
none		none		Decatur County, Tennessee	11,820
none		none		Perry County, Tennessee	9,126
none		none		Houston County, Tennessee	8,479
none		none		Clay County, Tennessee	7,821
none		none		Hancock County, Tennessee	7,075
none		none		Van Buren County, Tennessee	6,874
none		none		Lake County, Tennessee	6,249
none		none		Pickett County, Tennessee	5,219
State of Tennessee					7,315,076

The 27 core-based statistical areas of the State of Tennessee (Note: For CBSAs comprising populations from multiple states, they are listed twice to show both their intrastate population within that CBSA as well as the CBSA's total population. Only the intrastate population is ranked.)
2025 rank	Core-based statistical area	Population				
2025 rank	Core-based statistical area	2025 estimate	Change	2020 Census	Change	2010 Census
1	Nashville-Davidson–Murfreesboro–Franklin, TN MSA	2,197,416	+9.08%	2,014,444	+20.56%	1,670,890
2	Memphis, TN-MS-AR MSA (TN)	1,017,584	−1.46%	1,032,704	+0.54%	1,027,138
3	Knoxville, TN MSA	968,137	+7.18%	903,300	+7.85%	837,571
4	Chattanooga, TN-GA MSA (TN)	438,498	+6.72%	410,870	+8.46%	378,812
5	Clarksville, TN-KY MSA (TN)	264,374	+13.11%	233,726	+25.89%	185,655
6	Kingsport–Bristol, TN-VA MSA (TN)	223,318	+3.92%	214,884	+0.57%	213,656
7	Johnson City, TN MSA	216,416	+4.41%	207,285	+4.31%	198,716
8	Jackson, TN MSA	184,569	+2.25%	180,504	+0.45%	179,694
9	Cookeville, TN μSA	152,477	+7.88%	141,333	+7.17%	131,883
10	Cleveland, TN MSA	134,057	+6.26%	126,164	+8.96%	115,788
11	Morristown, TN MSA	128,867	+8.13%	119,182	+4.59%	113,951
12	Sevierville, TN μSA	101,342	+3.01%	98,380	+9.45%	89,889
13	Greeneville, TN μSA	73,831	+5.24%	70,152	+1.92%	68,831
14	Athens, TN μSA	71,590	+8.41%	66,034	+3.15%	64,019
15	Tullahoma–Manchester, TN μSA	69,339	+7.75%	64,350	+8.78%	59,158
16	Crossville, TN μSA	66,300	+8.43%	61,145	+9.08%	56,053
17	Shelbyville, TN μSA	55,273	+10.02%	50,237	+11.49%	45,058
18	Lawrenceburg, TN μSA	46,914	+6.24%	44,159	+5.47%	41,869
19	Winchester, TN μSA	45,579	+6.56%	42,774	+4.19%	41,052
20	McMinnville, TN μSA	43,717	+6.75%	40,953	+2.80%	39,839
21	Newport, TN μSA	37,889	+5.25%	35,999	+0.94%	35,662
22	Lewisburg, TN μSA	38,071	+10.94%	34,318	+12.09%	30,617
23	Dyersburg, TN μSA	36,320	−1.31%	36,801	−4.00%	38,335
24	Fayetteville, TN μSA	36,853	+4.34%	35,319	+5.87%	33,361
25	Martin, TN μSA	33,261	+1.09%	32,902	−6.05%	35,021
26	Paris, TN μSA	32,896	+2.16%	32,199	−0.41%	32,330
27	Union City, TN μSA	30,067	−2.34%	30,787	−3.21%	31,807
	Chattanooga, TN-GA MSA	594,530	+5.67%	562,647	+6.53%	528,173
	Clarksville, TN-KY MSA	349,001	+8.88%	320,535	+17.01%	273,949
	Kingsport–Bristol, TN-VA MSA	314,834	+2.35%	307,614	−0.62%	309,544
	Memphis, TN-MS-AR MSA	1,341,412	−0.30%	1,345,425	+1.55%	1,324,829

The seven combined statistical areas of the State of Tennessee (Note: For CSAs comprising populations from multiple states, they are listed twice to show both their intrastate population within that CSA as well as the CSA's total population. Only the intrastate population is ranked.)
2025 rank	Combined statistical area	Population				
2025 rank	Combined statistical area	2025 estimate	Change	2020 Census	Change	2010 Census
1	Nashville-Davidson–Murfreesboro, TN CSA	2,452,592	+8.99%	2,250,282	+19.15%	1,888,644
2	Knoxville–Morristown–Sevierville, TN CSA	1,236,235	+6.86%	1,156,861	+7.41%	1,077,073
3	Memphis–Forrest City, TN-MS-AR CSA (TN)	1,017,584	−1.46%	1,032,704	+0.54%	1,027,138
4	Chattanooga–Cleveland–Dalton, TN-GA-AL CSA (TN)	644,145	+6.81%	603,068	+7.96%	558,619
5	Johnson City–Kingsport–Bristol, TN-VA CSA (TN)	513,565	+4.32%	492,321	+2.31%	481,203
6	Union City–Martin, TN CSA	63,328	−0.57%	63,689	−4.70%	66,828
7	Huntsville–Decatur–Albertville, AL-TN CSA (TN)	36,853	+4.34%	35,319	+5.87%	33,361
	Chattanooga–Cleveland–Dalton, TN-GA-AL CSA	1,027,577	+5.37%	975,226	+4.93%	929,449
	Huntsville–Decatur–Albertville, AL-TN CSA	931,245	+9.20%	852,756	+10.90%	768,911
	Johnson City–Kingsport–Bristol, TN-VA CSA	605,081	+3.42%	585,051	+1.38%	577,091
	Memphis–Forrest City, TN-MS-AR CSA	1,383,061	−0.49%	1,389,905	+0.77%	1,379,238

== See also ==
- Geography of Tennessee
  - Demographics of Tennessee
