= Georgia statistical areas =

Coordinates: 32.6415°N 83.4426°W

The U.S. State of Georgia currently has 46 statistical areas that have been delineated by the Office of Management and Budget (OMB). On July 21, 2023, the OMB delineated 7 combined statistical areas, 15 metropolitan statistical areas, and 24 micropolitan statistical areas within Georgia. As of 2023, the largest of these is the Atlanta--Athens-Clarke County--Sandy Springs, GA-AL CSA, encompassing 42 counties in Georgia as well as Chambers County, Alabama, anchored by Georgia's capital and largest city, Atlanta.

== Statistical areas ==
The Office of Management and Budget (OMB) has designated more than 1,000 statistical areas for the United States and Puerto Rico. These statistical areas are important geographic delineations of population clusters used by the OMB, the United States Census Bureau, planning organizations, and federal, state, and local government entities.

The OMB defines a core-based statistical area (CBSA) as the county or counties (or county-equivalents) surrounding at least one densely-settled core of at least 10,000 population, "plus adjacent counties having a high degree of social and economic integration with the core as measured through commuting ties with the counties containing the core". The OMB further divides a CBSA based on population into a metropolitan statistical area (MSA) for those with at least 50,000 people or a micropolitan statistical area (μSA) for those with 10,000 to 49,999 people.

The OMB defines a combined statistical area (CSA) as two or more adjacent CBSAs where the employment interchange rate (percent commuting from A to B plus percent commuting from B to A) is at least 15%. A primary statistical area (PSA) includes all CSAs and any CBSA that is not a constituent of a combined statistical area.

The 46 United States statistical areas and 159 counties of the State of Georgia (Note: An out-of-state area and its population are displayed in green. An area that extends into more than one state is displayed in purple. A purple population number over a black population number show the total population versus the in-state population. The state's abbreviation is also shown next to the in-state total.)
Combined statistical area	2025 population (est.)	Core-based statistical area	2025 population (est.)	County	2025 population (est.)	Metropolitan division	2025 population (est.)
Atlanta--Athens-Clarke County--Sandy Springs, GA-AL CSA	7,426,769; 7,392,516(GA)	Atlanta-Sandy Springs-Roswell, GA MSA	6,482,182	Fulton County, Georgia	1,098,791	Atlanta-Sandy Springs-Roswell, GA MD	4,913,673
Atlanta--Athens-Clarke County--Sandy Springs, GA-AL CSA	7,426,769; 7,392,516(GA)	Atlanta-Sandy Springs-Roswell, GA MSA	6,482,182	Gwinnett County, Georgia	1,018,099	Atlanta-Sandy Springs-Roswell, GA MD	4,913,673
Atlanta--Athens-Clarke County--Sandy Springs, GA-AL CSA	7,426,769; 7,392,516(GA)	Atlanta-Sandy Springs-Roswell, GA MSA	6,482,182	DeKalb County, Georgia	774,394	Atlanta-Sandy Springs-Roswell, GA MD	4,913,673
Atlanta--Athens-Clarke County--Sandy Springs, GA-AL CSA	7,426,769; 7,392,516(GA)	Atlanta-Sandy Springs-Roswell, GA MSA	6,482,182	Clayton County, Georgia	297,471	Atlanta-Sandy Springs-Roswell, GA MD	4,913,673
Atlanta--Athens-Clarke County--Sandy Springs, GA-AL CSA	7,426,769; 7,392,516(GA)	Atlanta-Sandy Springs-Roswell, GA MSA	6,482,182	Forsyth County, Georgia	282,805	Atlanta-Sandy Springs-Roswell, GA MD	4,913,673
Atlanta--Athens-Clarke County--Sandy Springs, GA-AL CSA	7,426,769; 7,392,516(GA)	Atlanta-Sandy Springs-Roswell, GA MSA	6,482,182	Henry County, Georgia	264,922	Atlanta-Sandy Springs-Roswell, GA MD	4,913,673
Atlanta--Athens-Clarke County--Sandy Springs, GA-AL CSA	7,426,769; 7,392,516(GA)	Atlanta-Sandy Springs-Roswell, GA MSA	6,482,182	Coweta County, Georgia	160,240	Atlanta-Sandy Springs-Roswell, GA MD	4,913,673
Atlanta--Athens-Clarke County--Sandy Springs, GA-AL CSA	7,426,769; 7,392,516(GA)	Atlanta-Sandy Springs-Roswell, GA MSA	6,482,182	Douglas County, Georgia	154,293	Atlanta-Sandy Springs-Roswell, GA MD	4,913,673
Atlanta--Athens-Clarke County--Sandy Springs, GA-AL CSA	7,426,769; 7,392,516(GA)	Atlanta-Sandy Springs-Roswell, GA MSA	6,482,182	Carroll County, Georgia	131,036	Atlanta-Sandy Springs-Roswell, GA MD	4,913,673
Atlanta--Athens-Clarke County--Sandy Springs, GA-AL CSA	7,426,769; 7,392,516(GA)	Atlanta-Sandy Springs-Roswell, GA MSA	6,482,182	Fayette County, Georgia	125,156	Atlanta-Sandy Springs-Roswell, GA MD	4,913,673
Atlanta--Athens-Clarke County--Sandy Springs, GA-AL CSA	7,426,769; 7,392,516(GA)	Atlanta-Sandy Springs-Roswell, GA MSA	6,482,182	Newton County, Georgia	125,583	Atlanta-Sandy Springs-Roswell, GA MD	4,913,673
Atlanta--Athens-Clarke County--Sandy Springs, GA-AL CSA	7,426,769; 7,392,516(GA)	Atlanta-Sandy Springs-Roswell, GA MSA	6,482,182	Walton County, Georgia	112,696	Atlanta-Sandy Springs-Roswell, GA MD	4,913,673
Atlanta--Athens-Clarke County--Sandy Springs, GA-AL CSA	7,426,769; 7,392,516(GA)	Atlanta-Sandy Springs-Roswell, GA MSA	6,482,182	Rockdale County, Georgia	98,416	Atlanta-Sandy Springs-Roswell, GA MD	4,913,673
Atlanta--Athens-Clarke County--Sandy Springs, GA-AL CSA	7,426,769; 7,392,516(GA)	Atlanta-Sandy Springs-Roswell, GA MSA	6,482,182	Barrow County, Georgia	99,773	Atlanta-Sandy Springs-Roswell, GA MD	4,913,673
Atlanta--Athens-Clarke County--Sandy Springs, GA-AL CSA	7,426,769; 7,392,516(GA)	Atlanta-Sandy Springs-Roswell, GA MSA	6,482,182	Spalding County, Georgia	70,775	Atlanta-Sandy Springs-Roswell, GA MD	4,913,673
Atlanta--Athens-Clarke County--Sandy Springs, GA-AL CSA	7,426,769; 7,392,516(GA)	Atlanta-Sandy Springs-Roswell, GA MSA	6,482,182	Pickens County, Georgia	37,167	Atlanta-Sandy Springs-Roswell, GA MD	4,913,673
Atlanta--Athens-Clarke County--Sandy Springs, GA-AL CSA	7,426,769; 7,392,516(GA)	Atlanta-Sandy Springs-Roswell, GA MSA	6,482,182	Lumpkin County, Georgia	36,178	Atlanta-Sandy Springs-Roswell, GA MD	4,913,673
Atlanta--Athens-Clarke County--Sandy Springs, GA-AL CSA	7,426,769; 7,392,516(GA)	Atlanta-Sandy Springs-Roswell, GA MSA	6,482,182	Dawson County, Georgia	35,365	Atlanta-Sandy Springs-Roswell, GA MD	4,913,673
Atlanta--Athens-Clarke County--Sandy Springs, GA-AL CSA	7,426,769; 7,392,516(GA)	Atlanta-Sandy Springs-Roswell, GA MSA	6,482,182	Butts County, Georgia	27,218	Atlanta-Sandy Springs-Roswell, GA MD	4,913,673
Atlanta--Athens-Clarke County--Sandy Springs, GA-AL CSA	7,426,769; 7,392,516(GA)	Atlanta-Sandy Springs-Roswell, GA MSA	6,482,182	Morgan County, Georgia	22,095	Atlanta-Sandy Springs-Roswell, GA MD	4,913,673
Atlanta--Athens-Clarke County--Sandy Springs, GA-AL CSA	7,426,769; 7,392,516(GA)	Atlanta-Sandy Springs-Roswell, GA MSA	6,482,182	Meriwether County, Georgia	21,516	Atlanta-Sandy Springs-Roswell, GA MD	4,913,673
Atlanta--Athens-Clarke County--Sandy Springs, GA-AL CSA	7,426,769; 7,392,516(GA)	Atlanta-Sandy Springs-Roswell, GA MSA	6,482,182	Pike County, Georgia	20,932	Atlanta-Sandy Springs-Roswell, GA MD	4,913,673
Atlanta--Athens-Clarke County--Sandy Springs, GA-AL CSA	7,426,769; 7,392,516(GA)	Atlanta-Sandy Springs-Roswell, GA MSA	6,482,182	Jasper County, Georgia	17,632	Atlanta-Sandy Springs-Roswell, GA MD	4,913,673
Atlanta--Athens-Clarke County--Sandy Springs, GA-AL CSA	7,426,769; 7,392,516(GA)	Atlanta-Sandy Springs-Roswell, GA MSA	6,482,182	Heard County, Georgia	12,149	Atlanta-Sandy Springs-Roswell, GA MD	4,913,673
Atlanta--Athens-Clarke County--Sandy Springs, GA-AL CSA	7,426,769; 7,392,516(GA)	Atlanta-Sandy Springs-Roswell, GA MSA	6,482,182	Cobb County, Georgia	793,345	Marietta, GA MD	1,393,588
Atlanta--Athens-Clarke County--Sandy Springs, GA-AL CSA	7,426,769; 7,392,516(GA)	Atlanta-Sandy Springs-Roswell, GA MSA	6,482,182	Cherokee County, Georgia	299,273	Marietta, GA MD	1,393,588
Atlanta--Athens-Clarke County--Sandy Springs, GA-AL CSA	7,426,769; 7,392,516(GA)	Atlanta-Sandy Springs-Roswell, GA MSA	6,482,182	Paulding County, Georgia	190,996	Marietta, GA MD	1,393,588
Atlanta--Athens-Clarke County--Sandy Springs, GA-AL CSA	7,426,769; 7,392,516(GA)	Atlanta-Sandy Springs-Roswell, GA MSA	6,482,182	Bartow County, Georgia	120,800	Marietta, GA MD	1,393,588
Atlanta--Athens-Clarke County--Sandy Springs, GA-AL CSA	7,426,769; 7,392,516(GA)	Atlanta-Sandy Springs-Roswell, GA MSA	6,482,182	Haralson County, Georgia	33,066	Marietta, GA MD	1,393,588
Atlanta--Athens-Clarke County--Sandy Springs, GA-AL CSA	7,426,769; 7,392,516(GA)	Athens-Clarke County, GA MSA	224,148	Clarke County, Georgia	129,921	none	
Atlanta--Athens-Clarke County--Sandy Springs, GA-AL CSA	7,426,769; 7,392,516(GA)	Athens-Clarke County, GA MSA	224,148	Oconee County, Georgia	44,893	none	
Atlanta--Athens-Clarke County--Sandy Springs, GA-AL CSA	7,426,769; 7,392,516(GA)	Athens-Clarke County, GA MSA	224,148	Madison County, Georgia	32,919	none	
Atlanta--Athens-Clarke County--Sandy Springs, GA-AL CSA	7,426,769; 7,392,516(GA)	Athens-Clarke County, GA MSA	224,148	Oglethorpe County, Georgia	16,415	none	
Atlanta--Athens-Clarke County--Sandy Springs, GA-AL CSA	7,426,769; 7,392,516(GA)	Gainesville, GA MSA	226,568	Hall County, Georgia	226,568	none	
Atlanta--Athens-Clarke County--Sandy Springs, GA-AL CSA	7,426,769; 7,392,516(GA)	LaGrange, GA-AL μSA	107,097; 72,844(GA)	Troup County, Georgia	72,844	none	
Atlanta--Athens-Clarke County--Sandy Springs, GA-AL CSA	7,426,769; 7,392,516(GA)	LaGrange, GA-AL μSA	107,097; 72,844(GA)	Chambers County, Alabama	34,253	none	
Atlanta--Athens-Clarke County--Sandy Springs, GA-AL CSA	7,426,769; 7,392,516(GA)	Rome, GA MSA	101,378	Floyd County, Georgia	101,378	none	
Atlanta--Athens-Clarke County--Sandy Springs, GA-AL CSA	7,426,769; 7,392,516(GA)	Jefferson, GA μSA	99,265	Jackson County, Georgia	99,265	none	
Atlanta--Athens-Clarke County--Sandy Springs, GA-AL CSA	7,426,769; 7,392,516(GA)	Calhoun, GA μSA	61,701	Gordon County, Georgia	61,701	none	
Atlanta--Athens-Clarke County--Sandy Springs, GA-AL CSA	7,426,769; 7,392,516(GA)	Cornelia, GA μSA	50,416	Habersham County, Georgia	50,416	none	
Atlanta--Athens-Clarke County--Sandy Springs, GA-AL CSA	7,426,769; 7,392,516(GA)	Cedartown, GA μSA	45,514	Polk County, Georgia	45,514	none	
Atlanta--Athens-Clarke County--Sandy Springs, GA-AL CSA	7,426,769; 7,392,516(GA)	Thomaston, GA μSA	28,500	Upson County, Georgia	28,500	none	
Savannah-Hinesville-Statesboro, GA CSA	660,642	Savannah, GA MSA	438,314	Chatham County, Georgia	311,855	none	
Savannah-Hinesville-Statesboro, GA CSA	660,642	Savannah, GA MSA	438,314	Effingham County, Georgia	74,397	none	
Savannah-Hinesville-Statesboro, GA CSA	660,642	Savannah, GA MSA	438,314	Bryan County, Georgia	52,062	none	
Savannah-Hinesville-Statesboro, GA CSA	660,642	Statesboro, GA μSA	97,977	Bulloch County, Georgia	86,949	none	
Savannah-Hinesville-Statesboro, GA CSA	660,642	Statesboro, GA μSA	97,977	Evans County, Georgia	11,028	none	
Savannah-Hinesville-Statesboro, GA CSA	660,642	Hinesville, GA MSA	91,870	Liberty County, Georgia	70,313	none	
Savannah-Hinesville-Statesboro, GA CSA	660,642	Hinesville, GA MSA	91,870	Long County, Georgia	21,557	none	
Savannah-Hinesville-Statesboro, GA CSA	660,642	Jesup, GA μSA	32,481	Wayne County, Georgia	32,481	none	
Macon-Bibb County--Warner Robins, GA CSA	446,644	Macon-Bibb County, GA MSA	238,553	Bibb County, Georgia	157,556	none	
Macon-Bibb County--Warner Robins, GA CSA	446,644	Macon-Bibb County, GA MSA	238,553	Monroe County, Georgia	32,023	none	
Macon-Bibb County--Warner Robins, GA CSA	446,644	Macon-Bibb County, GA MSA	238,553	Jones County, Georgia	29,171	none	
Macon-Bibb County--Warner Robins, GA CSA	446,644	Macon-Bibb County, GA MSA	238,553	Crawford County, Georgia	12,206	none	
Macon-Bibb County--Warner Robins, GA CSA	446,644	Macon-Bibb County, GA MSA	238,553	Twiggs County, Georgia	7,597	none	
Macon-Bibb County--Warner Robins, GA CSA	446,644	Warner Robins, GA MSA	208,091	Houston County, Georgia	178,214	none	
Macon-Bibb County--Warner Robins, GA CSA	446,644	Warner Robins, GA MSA	208,091	Peach County, Georgia	29,877	none	
none		Augusta-Richmond County, GA-SC MSA	641,231; 429,908(GA)	Richmond County, Georgia	206,559	none	
none		Augusta-Richmond County, GA-SC MSA	641,231; 429,908(GA)	Aiken County, South Carolina	181,515	none	
none		Augusta-Richmond County, GA-SC MSA	641,231; 429,908(GA)	Columbia County, Georgia	169,189	none	
none		Augusta-Richmond County, GA-SC MSA	641,231; 429,908(GA)	Edgefield County, South Carolina	29,808	none	
none		Augusta-Richmond County, GA-SC MSA	641,231; 429,908(GA)	Burke County, Georgia	24,408	none	
none		Augusta-Richmond County, GA-SC MSA	641,231; 429,908(GA)	McDuffie County, Georgia	21,640	none	
none		Augusta-Richmond County, GA-SC MSA	641,231; 429,908(GA)	Lincoln County, Georgia	8,112	none	
Chattanooga-Cleveland-Dalton, TN-GA-AL CSA	1,027,577; 329,151(GA)	Chattanooga, TN-GA MSA	594,530; 156,032(GA)	Hamilton County, Tennessee	390,833	none	
Chattanooga-Cleveland-Dalton, TN-GA-AL CSA	1,027,577; 329,151(GA)	Chattanooga, TN-GA MSA	594,530; 156,032(GA)	Walker County, Georgia	70,250	none	
Chattanooga-Cleveland-Dalton, TN-GA-AL CSA	1,027,577; 329,151(GA)	Chattanooga, TN-GA MSA	594,530; 156,032(GA)	Catoosa County, Georgia	69,628	none	
Chattanooga-Cleveland-Dalton, TN-GA-AL CSA	1,027,577; 329,151(GA)	Chattanooga, TN-GA MSA	594,530; 156,032(GA)	Marion County, Tennessee	29,804	none	
Chattanooga-Cleveland-Dalton, TN-GA-AL CSA	1,027,577; 329,151(GA)	Chattanooga, TN-GA MSA	594,530; 156,032(GA)	Sequatchie County, Tennessee	17,861	none	
Chattanooga-Cleveland-Dalton, TN-GA-AL CSA	1,027,577; 329,151(GA)	Chattanooga, TN-GA MSA	594,530; 156,032(GA)	Dade County, Georgia	16,154	none	
Chattanooga-Cleveland-Dalton, TN-GA-AL CSA	1,027,577; 329,151(GA)	Dalton, GA MSA	147,819	Whitfield County, Georgia	106,212	none	
Chattanooga-Cleveland-Dalton, TN-GA-AL CSA	1,027,577; 329,151(GA)	Dalton, GA MSA	147,819	Murray County, Georgia	41,607	none	
Chattanooga-Cleveland-Dalton, TN-GA-AL CSA	1,027,577; 329,151(GA)	Cleveland, TN MSA	134,057	Bradley County, Tennessee	115,465	none	
Chattanooga-Cleveland-Dalton, TN-GA-AL CSA	1,027,577; 329,151(GA)	Cleveland, TN MSA	134,057	Polk County, Tennessee	18,592	none	
Chattanooga-Cleveland-Dalton, TN-GA-AL CSA	1,027,577; 329,151(GA)	Athens, TN μSA	71,590	McMinn County, Tennessee	57,404	none	
Chattanooga-Cleveland-Dalton, TN-GA-AL CSA	1,027,577; 329,151(GA)	Athens, TN μSA	71,590	Meigs County, Tennessee	14,186	none	
Chattanooga-Cleveland-Dalton, TN-GA-AL CSA	1,027,577; 329,151(GA)	Scottsboro, AL μSA	54,281	Jackson County, Alabama	54,281	none	
Chattanooga-Cleveland-Dalton, TN-GA-AL CSA	1,027,577; 329,151(GA)	Summerville, GA μSA	25,300	Chattooga County, Georgia	25,300	none	
Columbus-Auburn-Opelika, GA-AL CSA	555,664; 265,932(GA)	Columbus, GA-AL MSA	324,830; 265,932(GA)	Muscogee County, Georgia	202,171	none	
Columbus-Auburn-Opelika, GA-AL CSA	555,664; 265,932(GA)	Columbus, GA-AL MSA	324,830; 265,932(GA)	Russell County, Alabama	58,898	none	
Columbus-Auburn-Opelika, GA-AL CSA	555,664; 265,932(GA)	Columbus, GA-AL MSA	324,830; 265,932(GA)	Harris County, Georgia	37,280	none	
Columbus-Auburn-Opelika, GA-AL CSA	555,664; 265,932(GA)	Columbus, GA-AL MSA	324,830; 265,932(GA)	Chattahoochee County, Georgia	8,465	none	
Columbus-Auburn-Opelika, GA-AL CSA	555,664; 265,932(GA)	Columbus, GA-AL MSA	324,830; 265,932(GA)	Marion County, Georgia	7,676	none	
Columbus-Auburn-Opelika, GA-AL CSA	555,664; 265,932(GA)	Columbus, GA-AL MSA	324,830; 265,932(GA)	Talbot County, Georgia	5,709	none	
Columbus-Auburn-Opelika, GA-AL CSA	555,664; 265,932(GA)	Columbus, GA-AL MSA	324,830; 265,932(GA)	Stewart County, Georgia	4,631	none	
Columbus-Auburn-Opelika, GA-AL CSA	555,664; 265,932(GA)	Auburn-Opelika, AL MSA	189,881	Lee County, Alabama	189,881	none	
Columbus-Auburn-Opelika, GA-AL CSA	555,664; 265,932(GA)	Alexander City, AL μSA	40,953	Tallapoosa County, Alabama	40,953	none	
none		Valdosta, GA MSA	153,276	Lowndes County, Georgia	122,867	none	
none		Valdosta, GA MSA	153,276	Brooks County, Georgia	16,101	none	
none		Valdosta, GA MSA	153,276	Lanier County, Georgia	10,623	none	
none		Valdosta, GA MSA	153,276	Echols County, Georgia	3,685	none	
none		Albany, GA MSA	145,510	Dougherty County, Georgia	82,616	none	
none		Albany, GA MSA	145,510	Lee County, Georgia	34,179	none	
none		Albany, GA MSA	145,510	Worth County, Georgia	20,059	none	
none		Albany, GA MSA	145,510	Terrell County, Georgia	8,656	none	
none		Brunswick-St. Simons, GA MSA	118,524	Glynn County, Georgia	87,599	none	
none		Brunswick-St. Simons, GA MSA	118,524	Brantley County, Georgia	18,936	none	
none		Brunswick-St. Simons, GA MSA	118,524	McIntosh County, Georgia	11,989	none	
none		Thomasville, GA μSA	72,958	Thomas County, Georgia	46,368	none	
none		Thomasville, GA μSA	72,958	Grady County, Georgia	26,590	none	
none		Dublin, GA μSA	60,351	Laurens County, Georgia	51,041	none	
none		Dublin, GA μSA	60,351	Johnson County, Georgia	9,310	none	
Jacksonville-Palatka-St. Marys, FL-GA CSA	1,925,016; 60,143 (GA)	Jacksonville, FL MSA	1,785,500	Duval County, Florida	1,062,963	none	
Jacksonville-Palatka-St. Marys, FL-GA CSA	1,925,016; 60,143 (GA)	Jacksonville, FL MSA	1,785,500	St. Johns County, Florida	346,328	none	
Jacksonville-Palatka-St. Marys, FL-GA CSA	1,925,016; 60,143 (GA)	Jacksonville, FL MSA	1,785,500	Clay County Florida	239,593	none	
Jacksonville-Palatka-St. Marys, FL-GA CSA	1,925,016; 60,143 (GA)	Jacksonville, FL MSA	1,785,500	Nassau County Florida	106,879	none	
Jacksonville-Palatka-St. Marys, FL-GA CSA	1,925,016; 60,143 (GA)	Jacksonville, FL MSA	1,785,500	Baker County Florida	29,737	none	
Jacksonville-Palatka-St. Marys, FL-GA CSA	1,925,016; 60,143 (GA)	Palatka, FL μSA	77,734	Putnam County Florida	77,734	none	
Jacksonville-Palatka-St. Marys, FL-GA CSA	1,925,016; 60,143 (GA)	Kingsland, GA μSA	60,143	Camden County, Georgia	60,143	none	
none		Waycross, GA μSA	57,670	Ware County, Georgia	36,906	none	
none		Waycross, GA μSA	57,670	Pierce County, Georgia	20,764	none	
none		Douglas, GA μSA	52,861	Coffee County, Georgia	44,407	none	
none		Douglas, GA μSA	52,861	Atkinson County, Georgia	8,454	none	
none		Tifton, GA μSA	51,237	Tift County, Georgia	42,254	none	
none		Tifton, GA μSA	51,237	Turner County, Georgia	8,983	none	
none		Moultrie, GA μSA	47,438	Colquitt County, Georgia	47,438	none	
none		Milledgeville, GA μSA	44,029	Baldwin County, Georgia	44,029	none	
none		Vidalia, GA μSA	36,180	Toombs County, Georgia	27,545	none	
none		Vidalia, GA μSA	36,180	Montgomery County, Georgia	8,635	none	
none		Americus, GA μSA	33,394	Sumter County, Georgia	28,801	none	
none		Americus, GA μSA	33,394	Schley County, Georgia	4,593	none	
Tallahassee-Bainbridge, FL-GA CSA	426,843; 29,432 (GA)	Tallahassee, FL MSA	397,442	Leon County Florida	299,048	none	
Tallahassee-Bainbridge, FL-GA CSA	426,843; 29,432 (GA)	Tallahassee, FL MSA	397,442	Gadsden County Florida	44,298	none	
Tallahassee-Bainbridge, FL-GA CSA	426,843; 29,432 (GA)	Tallahassee, FL MSA	397,442	Wakulla County Florida	38,089	none	
Tallahassee-Bainbridge, FL-GA CSA	426,843; 29,432 (GA)	Tallahassee, FL MSA	397,442	Jefferson County Florida	16,007	none	
Tallahassee-Bainbridge, FL-GA CSA	426,843; 29,432 (GA)	Bainbridge, GA μSA	29,432	Decatur County, Georgia	29,432	none	
none		Toccoa, GA μSA	27,854	Stephens County, Georgia	27,854	none	
none		Cordele, GA μSA	19,237	Crisp County, Georgia	19,237	none	
none		Fitzgerald, GA μSA	17,099	Ben Hill County, Georgia	17,099	none	
none		Eufaula, AL-GA μSA	26,861; 2,254 (GA)	Barbour County, Alabama	24,607	none	
none		Eufaula, AL-GA μSA	26,861; 2,254 (GA)	Quitman County, Georgia	2,254	none	
none		none		Gilmer County, Georgia	33,894	none	
none		none		White County, Georgia	29,802	none	
none		none		Hart County, Georgia	28,639	none	
none		none		Union County, Georgia	27,859	none	
none		none		Fannin County, Georgia	26,111	none	
none		none		Franklin County, Georgia	25,948	none	
none		none		Tattnall County, Georgia	24,376	none	
none		none		Putnam County, Georgia	23,722	none	
none		none		Emanuel County, Georgia	23,147	none	
none		none		Mitchell County, Georgia	20,467	none	
none		none		Greene County, Georgia	21,367	none	
none		none		Lamar County, Georgia	20,941	none	
none		none		Elbert County, Georgia	20,072	none	
none		none		Washington County, Georgia	19,453	none	
none		none		Banks County, Georgia	21,273	none	
none		none		Dodge County, Georgia	19,663	none	
none		none		Berrien County, Georgia	18,932	none	
none		none		Appling County, Georgia	19,100	none	
none		none		Cook County, Georgia	18,232	none	
none		none		Rabun County, Georgia	17,764	none	
none		none		Jefferson County, Georgia	15,011	none	
none		none		Jeff Davis County, Georgia	15,219	none	
none		none		Screven County, Georgia	14,408	none	
none		none		Towns County, Georgia	13,285	none	
none		none		Charlton County, Georgia	13,121	none	
none		none		Bleckley County, Georgia	12,866	none	
none		none		Macon County, Georgia	11,756	none	
none		none		Bacon County, Georgia	11,070	none	
none		none		Candler County, Georgia	11,275	none	
none		none		Dooly County, Georgia	11,156	none	
none		none		Telfair County, Georgia	11,195	none	
none		none		Early County, Georgia	10,455	none	
none		none		Pulaski County, Georgia	10,172	none	
none		none		Wilkes County, Georgia	9,540	none	
none		none		Irwin County, Georgia	9,020	none	
none		none		Seminole County, Georgia	9,162	none	
none		none		Wilcox County, Georgia	8,797	none	
none		none		Wilkinson County, Georgia	8,650	none	
none		none		Hancock County, Georgia	8,682	none	
none		none		Jenkins County, Georgia	8,843	none	
none		none		Taylor County, Georgia	7,818	none	
none		none		Wheeler County, Georgia	7,570	none	
none		none		Clinch County, Georgia	6,847	none	
none		none		Treutlen County, Georgia	6,466	none	
none		none		Randolph County, Georgia	6,156	none	
none		none		Miller County, Georgia	5,812	none	
none		none		Calhoun County, Georgia	5,413	none	
none		none		Warren County, Georgia	5,269	none	
none		none		Glascock County, Georgia	3,141	none	
none		none		Clay County, Georgia	2,815	none	
none		none		Baker County, Georgia	2,725	none	
none		none		Webster County, Georgia	2,369	none	
none		none		Taliaferro County, Georgia	1,662	none	
State of Georgia					11,302,748	none	

The 39 core-based statistical areas of the State of Georgia (Note: For CBSAs comprising populations from multiple states, they are listed twice to show both their intrastate population within that CBSA as well as the CBSA's total population. Only the intrastate population is ranked.)
2025 rank	Core-based statistical area	Population				
2025 rank	Core-based statistical area	2025 estimate	Change	2020 Census	Change	2010 Census
1	Atlanta-Sandy Springs-Roswell, GA MSA	6,482,182	+5.86%	6,123,303	+15.17%	5,316,694
2	Savannah, GA MSA	438,314	+8.28%	404,798	+16.45%	347,611
3	Augusta-Richmond County, GA-SC MSA (GA)	429,908	+3.21%	416,535	+10.26%	377,789
4	Columbus, GA-AL MSA (GA)	265,932	−1.40%	269,700	+5.83%	254,841
5	Macon-Bibb County, GA MSA	238,553	+2.03%	233,802	+0.65%	232,293
6	Gainesville, GA MSA	226,568	+11.54%	203,136	+13.05%	179,684
7	Athens-Clarke County, GA MSA	224,148	+4.05%	215,415	+11.88%	192,541
8	Warner Robins, GA MSA	208,091	+8.60%	191,614	+14.33%	167,595
9	Chattanooga, TN-GA MSA (GA)	156,032	+2.80%	151,777	+1.62%	149,361
10	Valdosta, GA MSA	153,276	+2.92%	148,922	+6.69%	139,588
11	Albany, GA MSA	145,510	−2.29%	148,922	−3.60%	154,487
12	Dalton, GA MSA	147,819	+3.49%	142,837	+0.43%	142,227
13	Brunswick-St. Simons, GA MSA	118,524	+4.43%	113,495	+1.00%	112,370
14	Rome, GA MSA	101,378	+2.83%	98,584	+2.35%	96,317
15	Statesboro, GA μSA	97,977	+6.64%	91,873	+13.12%	81,217
16	Hinesville, GA MSA	91,870	+12.83%	81,424	+4.50%	77,917
17	Jefferson, GA μSA	99,265	+30.77%	75,907	+25.50%	60,485
18	Thomasville, GA μSA	72,958	+1.28%	72,034	+3.30%	69,731
19	LaGrange, GA-AL μSA (GA)	72,844	+4.92%	69,426	+3.55%	67,044
20	Calhoun, GA μSA	61,701	+7.22%	57,544	+4.27%	55,186
21	Dublin, GA μSA	60,351	+2.71%	58,759	+0.59%	58,414
22	Kingsland, GA μSA	60,143	+9.81%	54,768	+8.42%	50,513
23	Waycross, GA μSA	57,670	+3.04%	55,967	+1.63%	55,070
24	Douglas, GA μSA	52,861	+2.89%	51,378	+1.28%	50,731
25	Tifton, GA μSA	51,237	+1.76%	50,350	+2.65%	49,048
26	Cornelia, GA μSA	50,416	+9.53%	46,031	+6.95%	43,041
27	Moultrie, GA μSA	47,438	+3.36%	45,898	+0.88%	45,498
28	Cedartown, GA μSA	45,514	+6.21%	42,853	+3.32%	41,475
29	Milledgeville, GA μSA	44,029	+0.53%	43,799	−4.20%	45,720
30	Vidalia, GA μSA	36,180	+1.52%	35,640	−1.94%	36,346
31	Americus, GA μSA	33,394	−2.25%	34,163	−9.69%	37,829
32	Jesup, GA μSA	32,481	+7.75%	30,144	+0.15%	30,099
33	Bainbridge, GA μSA	29,432	+0.22%	29,367	+5.48%	27,842
34	Thomaston, GA μSA	28,500	+2.89%	27,700	+2.01%	27,153
35	Toccoa, GA μSA	27,854	+3.99%	26,784	+2.33%	26,175
36	Summerville, GA μSA	25,300	+1.34%	24,965	−4.04%	26,015
37	Cordele, GA μSA	19,237	−4.43%	20,128	−14.13%	23,439
38	Fitzgerald, GA μSA	17,099	−0.55%	17,194	−2.50%	17,634
39	Eufaula, AL-GA μSA (GA)	2,254	+0.85%	2,235	−11.06%	2,513
	Augusta-Richmond County, GA-SC MSA	641,231	+4.95%	611,000	+8.17%	564,873
	Chattanooga, TN-GA MSA	594,530	+5.67%	562,647	+6.53%	528,173
	Columbus, GA-AL MSA	324,830	−1.23%	328,883	+6.85%	307,788
	Eufaula, AL-GA μSA	26,861	−2.17%	27,458	−8.38%	29,970
	LaGrange, GA-AL μSA	107,097	+2.78%	104,198	+2.90%	101,259

The seven combined statistical areas of the State of Georgia (Note: For CSAs comprising populations from multiple states, they are listed twice to show both their intrastate population within that CSA as well as the CSA's total population. Only the intrastate population is ranked.)
2025 rank	Combined statistical area	Population				
2025 rank	Combined statistical area	2025 estimate	Change	2020 Census	Change	2010 Census
1	Atlanta--Athens-Clarke County--Sandy Springs, GA-AL CSA (GA)	7,392,516	+6.22%	6,959,899	+14.48%	6,079,620
2	Savannah-Hinesville-Statesboro, GA CSA	660,642	+8.62%	608,239	+13.30%	536,844
3	Macon-Bibb County--Warner-Robins, GA CSA	446,644	+4.99%	425,416	+6.38%	399,888
4	Chattanooga-Cleveland-Dalton, TN-GA-AL CSA (GA)	329,151	+3.00%	319,579	+0.62%	317,603
5	Columbus-Auburn-Opelika, GA-AL CSA (GA)	265,932	−1.40%	269,700	+5.83%	254,841
6	Jacksonville-Kingsland-Palatka, FL-GA CSA (GA)	60,143	+9.81%	54,768	+8.42%	50,513
7	Tallahassee-Bainbridge, FL-GA CSA (GA)	29,432	+0.22%	29,367	+5.48%	27,842
	Atlanta--Athens-Clarke County--Sandy Springs, GA-AL CSA	7,426,769	+6.18%	6,994,671	+14.41%	6,113,835
	Chattanooga-Cleveland-Dalton, TN-GA-AL CSA	1,027,577	+5.37%	975,226	+4.93%	929,449
	Columbus-Auburn-Opelika, GA-AL CSA	555,664	−1.47%	563,967	+10.34%	511,103
	Jacksonville-Kingsland-Palatka, FL-GA CSA	1,925,016	+11.02%	1,733,937	+17.58%	1,474,728
	Tallhassee-Bainbridge, FL-GA CSA	426,843	+3.19%	413,665	+4.66%	395,255

== See also ==
- Geography of Georgia (U.S. state)
  - Demographics of Georgia (U.S. state)
