= Shady Grove, Hamilton County, Tennessee =

- Unincorporated community
- Location within Tennessee Location within the United States
- Coordinates: 35°15′01″N 85°06′04″W
- Country: United States
- State: Tennessee
- County: Hamilton
- Elevation: 718 ft (219 m)
- Time zone: UTC-5 (Eastern (EST))
  - Summer (DST): UTC-4 (EDT)
- Area code: 423
- GNIS feature ID: 1301158

Shady Grove is an unincorporated community in Hamilton County, Tennessee, United States. Shady Grove is located on the west bank of the Tennessee River 3.2 miles (5.1 km) north-northeast of Lakesite.
