= Lone Oak, Tennessee =

Lone Oak
- Census-designated place
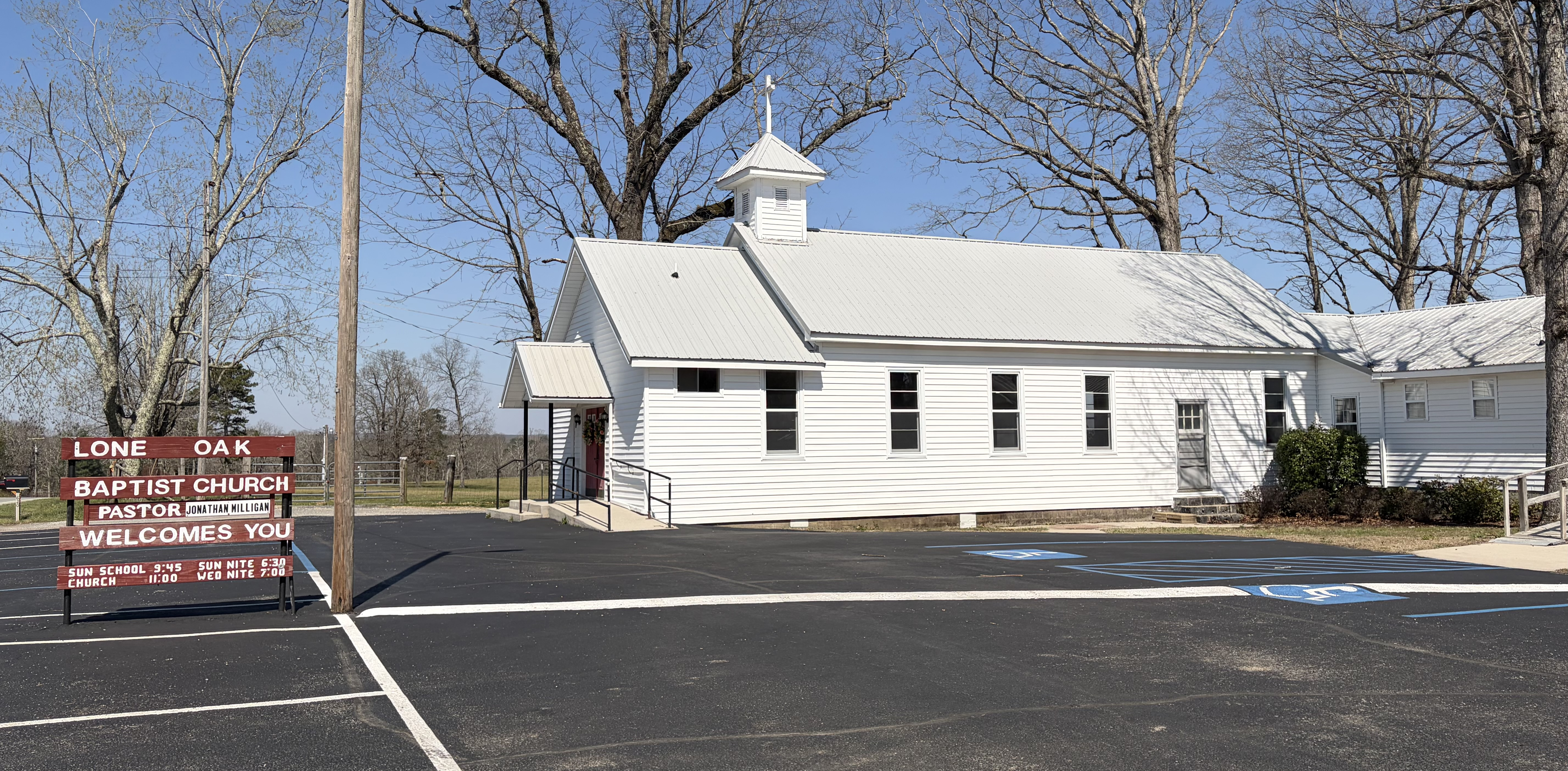
- Lone Oak Baptist Church

- Location within the state of Tennessee Lone Oak (the United States)
- Coordinates: 35°12′2″N 85°21′51″W
- Country: United States
- State: Tennessee
- County: Sequatchie

Area
  - Total: 6.47 sq mi (16.76 km^{2})
  - Land: 6.47 sq mi (16.76 km^{2})
  - Water: 0 sq mi (0.00 km^{2})
- Elevation: 2,001 ft (610 m)

Population (2020)
  - Total: 1,198
  - Density: 185.1/sq mi (71.47/km^{2})
- Time zone: UTC-6 (Central (CST))
  - Summer (DST): UTC-5 (CDT)
- ZIP codes: 37377
- FIPS code: 47-43420
- GNIS feature ID: 1291847

Lone Oak (also Browns Chapel or Top of the Mountain) is an unincorporated community and census-designated place (CDP) in southern Sequatchie County, Tennessee, United States. It lies along U.S. Route 127 south of the city of Dunlap, the county seat of Sequatchie County. Its elevation is 2,001 feet (610 m). As of the 2020 census, its population was 1,198, down from 1,206 at the 2010 census.

Lone Oak is part of the Chattanooga, TN–GA Metropolitan Statistical Area.

== Demographics ==
Historical population
Census	Pop.	Note	%±
2010	1,206		—
2020	1,198		−0.7%
U.S. Decennial Census

=== 2020 census ===
Lone Oak racial composition
Race	Number	Percentage
White (non-Hispanic)	1,107	92.4%
Black or African American (non-Hispanic)	16	1.34%
Native American	1	0.08%
Asian	2	0.17%
Other/Mixed	62	5.18%
Hispanic or Latino	10	0.83%

As of the 2020 United States census, there were 1,198 people, 423 households, and 336 families residing in the CDP.

== Postal service ==
Lone Oak does not have its own post office or zip code. It shares the zip code 37377 (Signal Mountain) with Walden, Fairmount and Signal Mountain.
