= East Brainerd, Tennessee =

- Unincorporated community
- Location of East Brainerd, Tennessee
- Coordinates: 35°0′50″N 85°6′32″W
- Country: United States
- State: Tennessee
- County: Hamilton

Area
  - Total: 8.7 sq mi (22.5 km^{2})
  - Land: 8.6 sq mi (22.4 km^{2})
  - Water: 0.039 sq mi (0.1 km^{2})
- Elevation: 735 ft (224 m)

Population (2000)
  - Total: 14,132
  - Density: 1,632/sq mi (630.3/km^{2})
- Time zone: UTC-5 (Eastern (EST))
  - Summer (DST): UTC-4 (EDT)
- ZIP code: 37421
- Area code: 423
- FIPS code: 47-22440
- GNIS feature ID: 1283322

East Brainerd is an unincorporated community and former census-designated place (CDP) in Hamilton County, Tennessee, United States. The population was 14,132 at the 2000 census and was not recorded at the 2010 census. It is part of the Chattanooga, TN–GA Metropolitan Statistical Area.

== Geography ==
East Brainerd is located at 35°0′50″N 85°6′32″W (35.013983, -85.108803).

According to the United States Census Bureau, the CDP has a total area of 8.7 square miles (23 km^{2}), of which 8.7 square miles (23 km^{2}) is land and 0.04 square miles (0.10 km^{2}) (0.35%) is water.

== Demographics ==
As of the census of 2000, there were 14,132 people, 4,839 households, and 4,151 families residing in the CDP. The population density was 1,632.5 inhabitants per square mile (630.3/km^{2}). There were 4,982 housing units at an average density of 575.5 per square mile (222.2/km^{2}). The racial makeup of the CDP was 88.38% White, 7.79% African American, 0.13% Native American, 2.26% Asian, 0.01% Pacific Islander, 0.46% from other races, and 0.98% from two or more races. Hispanic or Latino of any race were 1.37% of the population.

There were 4,839 households, out of which 41.9% had children under the age of 18 living with them, 76.3% were married couples living together, 7.2% had a female householder with no husband present, and 14.2% were non-families. 11.8% of all households were made up of individuals, and 3.5% had someone living alone who was 65 years of age or older. The average household size was 2.89 and the average family size was 3.14.

In the CDP, the population was spread out, with 27.5% under the age of 18, 6.6% from 18 to 24, 27.4% from 25 to 44, 29.7% from 45 to 64, and 8.7% who were 65 years of age or older. The median age was 39 years. For every 100 females, there were 96.3 males. For every 100 females age 18 and over, there were 93.7 males.

The median income for a household in the CDP was $66,151, and the median income for a family was $68,727. Males had a median income of $46,733 versus $29,179 for females. The per capita income for the CDP was $27,966. About 3.2% of families and 3.8% of the population were below the poverty line, including 6.0% of those under age 18 and 1.9% of those age 65 or over.

== Education ==
East Brainerd is the site of East Brainerd Elementary, Westview Elementary, Chattanooga School for Liberal Arts, and East Hamilton Middle/High School, which opened in 2009.

=== Notable people ===
- Nick Fontaine
