= Fairmount, Tennessee =

- CDP
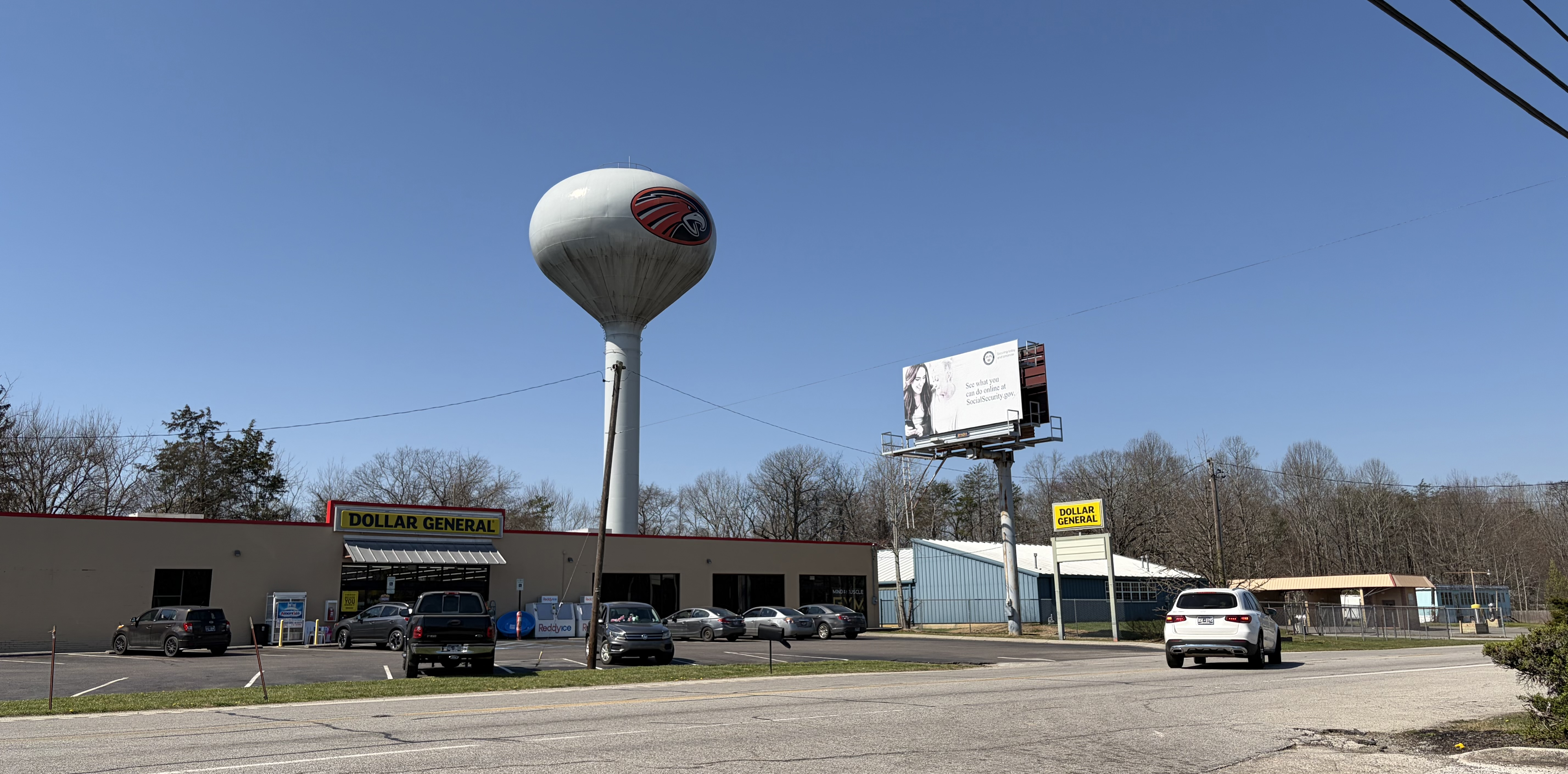
- A water tower and Dollar General store along U.S. Route 127 in Fairmount

- Location of Fairmount, Tennessee
- Coordinates: 35°10′34″N 85°19′59″W
- Country: United States
- State: Tennessee
- County: Hamilton

Area
  - Total: 4.19 sq mi (10.85 km^{2})
  - Land: 4.19 sq mi (10.85 km^{2})
  - Water: 0 sq mi (0.00 km^{2})
- Elevation: 1,736 ft (529 m)

Population (2,068 as of the 2020 census 1,607 as of 2023)
  - Total: 2,193
  - Density: 523.5/sq mi (202.13/km^{2})
- Time zone: UTC-5 (Eastern (EST))
  - Summer (DST): UTC-4 (EDT)
- Zip code: 37377
- FIPS code: 47-25090
- GNIS feature ID: 1328158

Fairmount is a census-designated place (CDP) in Hamilton County, Tennessee, United States. The population was 2,193 at the 2020 census, down from 2,825 at the 2010 census. It is part of the Chattanooga, TN–GA Metropolitan Statistical Area.

== Postal service ==
Fairmont is located within the town of Signal Mountain's zip code, 37377, along with the town of Walden to the east and the community of Lone Oak to the northwest.

== Geography ==
Fairmount is located on Walden Ridge at 35°10′34″N 85°19′59″W (35.176143, -85.333190).

According to the United States Census Bureau, the CDP has a total area of 5.2 square miles (13 km^{2}), all of it land.

== Demographics ==
|2020= 2193 |2020= 2193

Historical population
Census	Pop.	Note	%±

As of 2023, 1,607 people live here, and there are 639 households in the CDP. The population density was 440.4 inhabitants per square mile (170.0/km^{2}). There were 952 housing units at an average density of 161.3 per square mile (62.3/km^{2}). The racial makeup of the CDP was 82.62% White, 0% African American, 0% Native American, 0.95% Asian, 0% from other races, and 8.66% from two or more races.

There were 900 households, of which 43.4% had children under the age of 18 living with them, 75.9% were married couples living together, 6.2% had a female householder with no husband present, and 15.7% were non-families. 13.1% of all households were made up of individuals, and 4.8% had someone living alone who was 65 years of age or older. The average household size was 2.89 and the average family size was 3.18.

28.9% of the population were under the age of 18, 6.0% from 18 to 24, 27.8% from 25 to 44, 29.2% from 45 to 64, and 8.1% who were 65 years of age or older. The median age was 39 years. For every 100 females, there were 100.5 males. For every 100 females age 18 and over, there were 98.1 males.

The median household income was $61,141 and the median family income was $71,019. Males had a median income of $47,482 and females $29,500. The per capita income was $30,832. About 1.6% of families and 2.6% of the population were below the poverty line, including 3.0% of those under age 18 and 4.1% of those age 65 or over.
