= Fairview, Georgia =

- Unincorporated community Census-designated place
- Location in Walker County and the state of Georgia
- Coordinates: 34°56′5″N 85°17′19″W
- Country: United States
- State: Georgia
- County: Walker

Area
  - Total: 7.53 sq mi (19.49 km^{2})
  - Land: 7.53 sq mi (19.49 km^{2})
  - Water: 0 sq mi (0.00 km^{2})
- Elevation: 850 ft (259 m)

Population (2020)
  - Total: 6,409
  - Density: 851.6/sq mi (328.79/km^{2})
- Time zone: UTC-5 (Eastern (EST))
  - Summer (DST): UTC-4 (EDT)
- Area codes: 706/762
- FIPS code: 13-28632
- GNIS feature ID: 0331690

Fairview is an unincorporated community and census-designated place (CDP) in Walker County, Georgia, United States. In the 2020 census, the population was 6,409. It is part of the Chattanooga, TN–GA Metropolitan Statistical Area.

== Geography ==
Fairview is located at 34°56′5″N 85°17′19″W (34.934700, -85.288546).

According to the United States Census Bureau, the CDP has a total area of 7.5 square miles (19 km^{2}), all land.

== Demographics ==
Historical population
Census	Pop.	Note	%±
1980	6,558		—
1990	6,444		−1.7%
2000	6,601		2.4%
2010	6,769		2.5%
2020	6,409		−5.3%
U.S. Decennial Census; 1850-1870 1870-1880; 1890-1910 1920-1930; 1940 1950 1960; 1970 1980 1990; 2000 2010 2020

Fairview was first listed as a census designated place in the 1980 United States census.

=== Racial and ethnic composition ===
Fairview, Georgia – Racial and ethnic composition Note: the U.S. census treats Hispanic/Latino as an ethnic category. This table excludes Latinos from the racial categories and assigns them to a separate category. Hispanics/Latinos may be of any race.
Race / Ethnicity (NH = Non-Hispanic)	Pop 2000	Pop 2010	Pop 2020	% 2000	% 2010	% 2020
White alone (NH)	6,087	6,236	5,705	92.21%	92.13%	89.02%
Black or African American alone (NH)	342	262	251	5.18%	3.87%	3.92%
Native American or Alaska Native alone (NH)	23	18	29	0.35%	0.27%	0.45%
Asian alone (NH)	30	30	14	0.45%	0.44%	0.22%
Native Hawaiian or Pacific Islander alone (NH)	1	1	2	0.02%	0.01%	0.03%
Other race alone (NH)	1	4	17	0.02%	0.06%	0.27%
Mixed race or Multiracial (NH)	72	128	276	1.09%	1.89%	4.31%
Hispanic or Latino (any race)	45	90	115	0.68%	1.33%	1.79%
Total	6,601	6,769	6,409	100.00%	100.00%	100.00%

=== 2020 census ===
As of the 2020 census, Fairview had a population of 6,409. 97.8% of residents lived in urban areas, while 2.2% lived in rural areas.

The median age was 42.6 years. 20.8% of residents were under the age of 18 and 19.9% were 65 years of age or older. For every 100 females, there were 92.8 males, and for every 100 females age 18 and over, there were 88.2 males age 18 and over.

There were 2,555 households in Fairview, of which 29.9% had children under the age of 18 living in them. Of all households, 49.1% were married-couple households, 17.5% were households with a male householder and no spouse or partner present, and 27.5% were households with a female householder and no spouse or partner present. About 25.9% of all households were made up of individuals, and 12.4% had someone living alone who was 65 years of age or older.

There were 1,715 families residing in the CDP.

There were 2,836 housing units, of which 9.9% were vacant. The homeowner vacancy rate was 0.5% and the rental vacancy rate was 11.1%.

=== 2000 census ===
At the 2000 census, there were 6,601 people, 2,568 households and 1,931 families residing in the CDP. The population density was 879.7 inhabitants per square mile (339.7/km^{2}). There were 2,734 housing units at an average density of 364.4 per square mile (140.7/km^{2}). The racial makeup of the CDP was 92.56% White, 5.18% African American, 0.35% Native American, 0.48% Asian, 0.02% Pacific Islander, 0.24% from other races, and 1.17% from two or more races. Hispanic or Latino of any race were 0.68% of the population.

There were 2,568 households, of which 31.0% had children under the age of 18 living with them, 59.2% were married couples living together, 12.2% had a female householder with no husband present, and 24.8% were non-families. 22.0% of all households were made up of individuals, and 9.9% had someone living alone who was 65 years of age or older. The average household size was 2.57 and the average family size was 3.00.

24.3% of residents were under the age of 18, 8.9% from 18 to 24, 28.0% from 25 to 44, 24.8% from 45 to 64, and 14.0% who were 65 years of age or older. The median age was 38 years. For every 100 females, there were 92.6 males. For every 100 females age 18 and over, there were 88.8 males.

The median household income was $33,894 and the median family income was $40,379. Males had a median income of $30,015 versus $22,155 for females. The per capita income for the CDP was $15,687. About 7.2% of families and 8.8% of the population were below the poverty line, including 11.8% of those under age 18 and 10.1% of those age 65 or over.
