= Ridgeside, Tennessee =

Ridgeside, Tennessee Shepherd Hills
- City
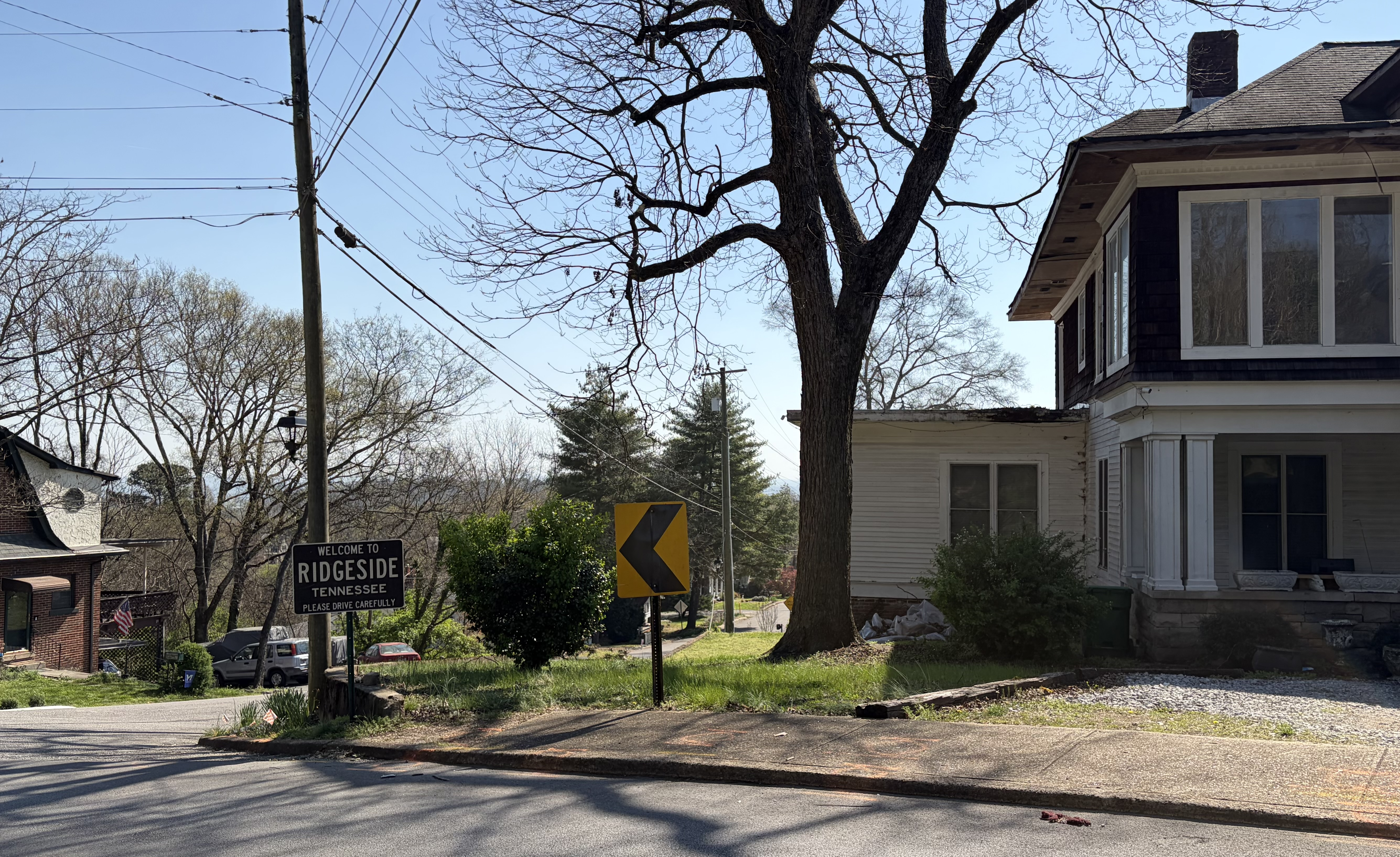
- Sign marking the boundary of Ridgeside
- Motto: "A city within a city"
- Location of Ridgeside in Hamilton County, Tennessee
- Coordinates: 35°2′6″N 85°14′53″W
- Country: United States
- State: Tennessee
- County: Hamilton
- Established: 1922
- Incorporated: 1931

Government
  - Type: Mayor-council government
  - Mayor: Katy Ingvalson
  - Commissioner: Darian Collins
  - Commissioner: Maria Thompson

Area
  - Total: 0.17 sq mi (0.44 km^{2})
  - Land: 0.17 sq mi (0.44 km^{2})
  - Water: 0 sq mi (0.00 km^{2})
- Elevation: 846 ft (258 m)

Population (2020)
  - Total: 446
  - Density: 2,632.2/sq mi (1,016.28/km^{2})
- Time zone: UTC-5 (Eastern (EST))
  - Summer (DST): UTC-4 (EDT)
- ZIP code: 37411
- Area code: 423
- FIPS code: 47-63080
- GNIS feature ID: 1299404
- Website: www.ridgesidetn.gov

Ridgeside is a city in Hamilton County, Tennessee, United States. The population was 446 at the 2020 census and estimated to be 432 in 2018. Ridgeside is an enclave, as it is completely surrounded by the city limits of Chattanooga. It is part of the Chattanooga, TN–GA Metropolitan Statistical Area. Ridgeside's name is derived from its location on the eastern slope (side) of Missionary Ridge. Locally, the city is also known as Shepherd Hills, after the bigger of its two subdivisions, the other being Crescent Park.

== History ==
Ridgeside is rooted in a dairy farm operated by John T. Shepherd in the early 1900s. In 1922, John's son, Paul, began building the "Shepherd Hills" subdivision, which was completed in 1952. Shepherd Hills incorporated as a city with the name "Ridgeside" in 1931, in part to avoid being annexed by rapidly growing Chattanooga.

Police services for the city of Ridgeside is served by the East Ridge Police, although at one time the city had its own police department.

== Geography ==
Ridgeside is located in southwestern Hamilton County at 35°02′06″N 85°14′53″W. It is surrounded by the city of Chattanooga and is 4 miles (6 km) east of that city's downtown.

According to the United States Census Bureau, the city has a total area of 0.2 square miles (0.4 km^{2}), all of it land.

== Demographics ==
Historical population
Census	Pop.	Note	%±
1940	443		—
1950	337		−23.9%
1960	448		32.9%
1970	458		2.2%
1980	417		−9.0%
1990	400		−4.1%
2000	389		−2.7%
2010	390		0.3%
2020	446		14.4%

=== Racial and ethnic composition ===
Ridgeside city, Tennessee – Racial and ethnic composition Note: the US Census treats Hispanic/Latino as an ethnic category. This table excludes Latinos from the racial categories and assigns them to a separate category. Hispanics/Latinos may be of any race.
Race / Ethnicity (NH = Non-Hispanic)	Pop 2000	Pop 2010	Pop 2020	% 2000	% 2010	% 2020
White alone (NH)	359	350	399	92.29%	89.74%	89.46%
Black or African American alone (NH)	20	25	8	5.14%	6.41%	1.79%
Native American or Alaska Native alone (NH)	0	1	1	0.00%	0.26%	0.22%
Asian alone (NH)	0	4	5	0.00%	1.03%	1.12%
Native Hawaiian or Pacific Islander alone (NH)	0	0	0	0.00%	0.00%	0.00%
Other race alone (NH)	0	0	2	0.00%	0.00%	0.45%
Mixed race or Multiracial (NH)	7	6	11	1.80%	1.54%	2.47%
Hispanic or Latino (any race)	3	4	20	0.77%	1.03%	4.48%
Total	389	390	446	100.00%	100.00%	100.00%

=== 2020 census ===
As of the 2020 census, Ridgeside had a population of 446. The median age was 46.4 years. 23.8% of residents were under the age of 18 and 17.7% of residents were 65 years of age or older. For every 100 females there were 94.8 males, and for every 100 females age 18 and over there were 91.0 males age 18 and over.

100.0% of residents lived in urban areas, while 0.0% lived in rural areas.

There were 153 households in Ridgeside, of which 39.9% had children under the age of 18 living in them. Of all households, 77.8% were married-couple households, 5.9% were households with a male householder and no spouse or partner present, and 15.0% were households with a female householder and no spouse or partner present. About 15.0% of all households were made up of individuals and 9.2% had someone living alone who was 65 years of age or older.

There were 159 housing units, of which 3.8% were vacant. The homeowner vacancy rate was 0.0% and the rental vacancy rate was 14.3%.

Racial composition as of the 2020 census
Race	Number	Percent
White	400	89.7%
Black or African American	9	2.0%
American Indian and Alaska Native	1	0.2%
Asian	5	1.1%
Native Hawaiian and Other Pacific Islander	0	0.0%
Some other race	6	1.3%
Two or more races	25	5.6%

=== 2000 census ===
As of the census of 2000, there was a population of 389, with 156 households and 112 families residing in the city. The population density was 2,250.6 inhabitants per square mile (869.0/km^{2}). There were 162 housing units at an average density of 937.3 per square mile (361.9/km^{2}). The racial makeup of the city was 92.54% White, 5.14% African American, and 2.31% from two or more races. Hispanic or Latino of any race were 0.77% of the population.

There were 156 households, out of which 30.1% had children under the age of 18 living with them, 63.5% were married couples living together, 7.1% had a female householder with no husband present, and 27.6% were non-families. 25.0% of all households were made up of individuals, and 16.7% had someone living alone who was 65 years of age or older. The average household size was 2.49 and the average family size was 2.97.

In the city, the population was spread out, with 25.7% under the age of 18, 3.9% from 18 to 24, 18.8% from 25 to 44, 30.6% from 45 to 64, and 21.1% who were 65 years of age or older. The median age was 46 years. For every 100 females, there were 81.8 males. For every 100 females age 18 and over, there were 79.5 males.

The median income for a household in the city was $88,996, and the median income for a family was $96,602. Males had a median income of $63,750 versus $45,313 for females. The per capita income for the city was $35,138. About 1.8% of families and 4.6% of the population were below the poverty line, including 3.2% of those under age 18 and 3.9% of those age 65 or over.
