= Walden, Tennessee =

- Town
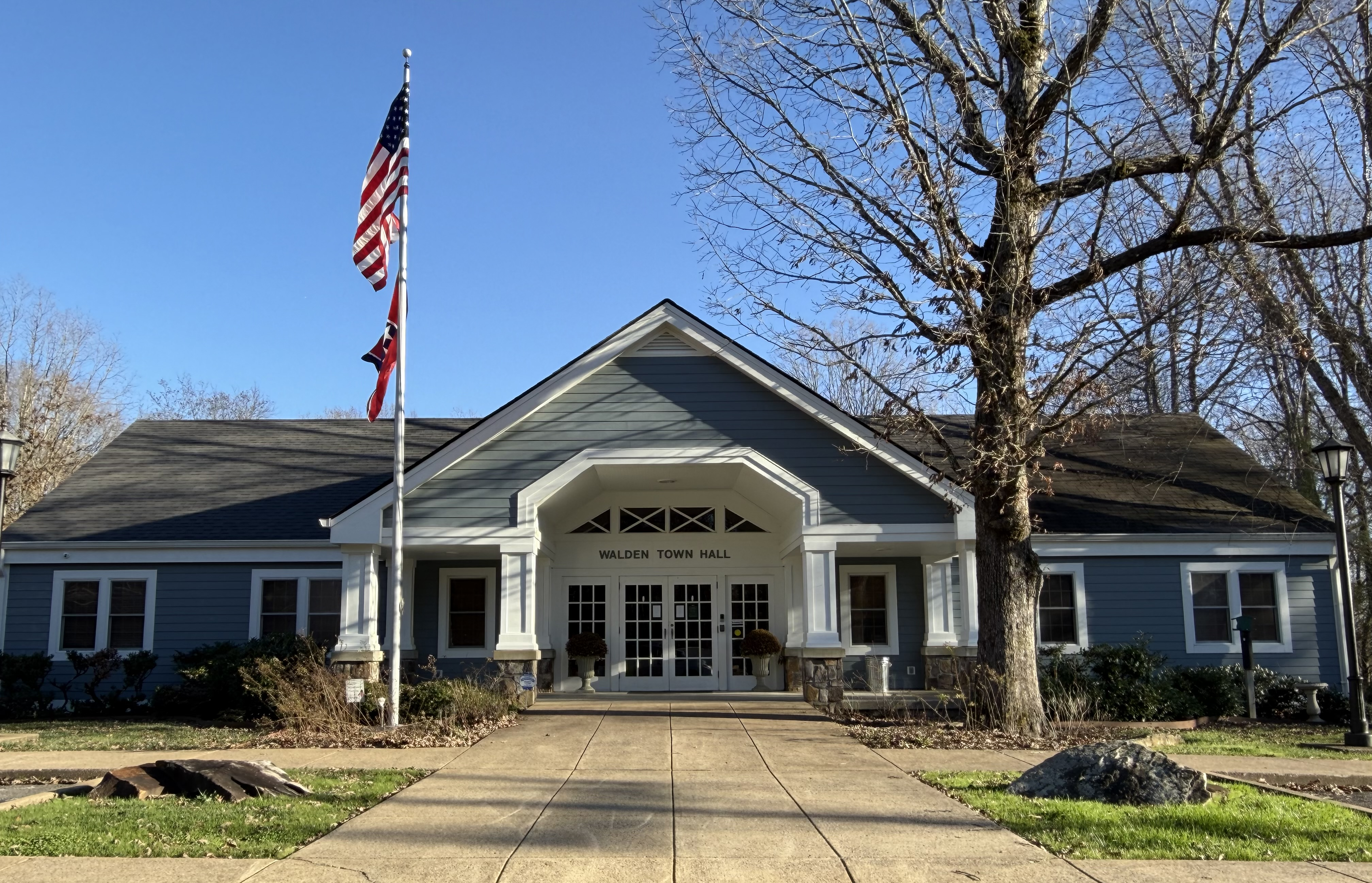
- Walden's town hall
- Nickname: Summertown
- Location of Walden in Hamilton County, Tennessee.
- Coordinates: 35°9′40″N 85°18′44″W
- Country: United States
- State: Tennessee
- County: Hamilton
- Incorporated: 1975

Government
  - Mayor: Lee Davis
  - Vice Mayor: Lizzy Schmidt

Area
  - Total: 3.53 sq mi (9.15 km^{2})
  - Land: 3.53 sq mi (9.15 km^{2})
  - Water: 0 sq mi (0.00 km^{2})
- Elevation: 1,900 ft (580 m)

Population (2020)
  - Total: 1,981
  - Density: 560.8/sq mi (216.52/km^{2})
- Time zone: UTC-5 (Eastern (EST))
  - Summer (DST): UTC-4 (EDT)
- Zip Code: 37377
- Area code: 423
- FIPS code: 47-77540
- GNIS feature ID: 1304322
- Website: waldentn.gov

Walden is a town located in Hamilton County, Tennessee, United States. The population was 1,981 at the 2020 census and up from 1,898 at the 2010 census. It is part of the Chattanooga, Tennessee–Georgia Metropolitan Statistical Area.

== Postal service ==
Walden, along with the communities of Fairmount and Lone Oak are located within the town of Signal Mountain's zip code, 37377.

== Geography ==
Walden is located at 35°9′40″N 85°18′44″W (35.161154, -85.312116). The town is situated atop Walden's Ridge, a section of the Cumberland Plateau.

According to the United States Census Bureau, the town has a total area of 3.6 square miles (9.3 km^{2}), all of it land.

== Demographics ==
Historical population
Census	Pop.	Note	%±
1980	1,293		—
1990	1,523		17.8%
2000	1,960		28.7%
2010	1,898		−3.2%
2020	1,981		4.4%

=== 2020 census ===
Walden racial composition
Race	Number	Percentage
White (non-Hispanic)	1,780	89.85%
Black or African American (non-Hispanic)	10	0.5%
Native American	6	0.3%
Asian	26	1.31%
Other/Mixed	80	4.04%
Hispanic or Latino	79	3.99%

As of the 2020 United States census, there were 1,981 people, 744 households, and 550 families residing in the town.

=== 2000 census ===
As of the census of 2000, there were 1,960 people, 728 households, and 583 families residing in the town. The population density was 539.5 inhabitants per square mile (208.3/km^{2}). There were 776 housing units at an average density of 213.6 per square mile (82.5/km^{2}). The racial makeup of the town was 99.13% White, 0.20% Native American, 0.36% Asian, 0.15% from other races, and 0.15% from two or more races. Hispanic or Latino of any race were 0.77% of the population.

There were 728 households, out of which 35.4% had children under the age of 18 living with them, 71.2% were married couples living together, 7.0% had a female householder with no husband present, and 19.8% were non-families. 17.6% of all households were made up of individuals, and 6.7% had someone living alone who was 65 years of age or older. The average household size was 2.69 and the average family size was 3.06.

In the town, the population was spread out, with 28.0% under the age of 18, 5.3% from 18 to 24, 25.7% from 25 to 44, 28.9% from 45 to 64, and 12.1% who were 65 years of age or older. The median age was 40 years. For every 100 females, there were 98.0 males. For every 100 females age 18 and over, there were 94.6 males.

The median income for a household in the town was $68,977, and the median income for a family was $75,919. Males had a median income of $60,074 versus $27,083 for females. The per capita income for the town was $37,287. About 4.9% of families and 4.6% of the population were below the poverty line, including 4.5% of those under age 18 and 3.8% of those age 65 or over.

== Communications hub ==
Because of its particularly high proximity atop the southerly "Signal Mountain" section of Walden Ridge, the town of Walden contains an antenna farm, with the transmitter sites of two of Chattanooga, Tennessee's television stations, WRCB-TV, Channel 3 and WTVC-TV, Channel 9. Also located near the WTVC-TV broadcasting tower, are towers for two of Chattanooga's Class C FM radio stations, WDOD-FM at 96.5, and WSKZ, at 106.5.
