= Falling Water, Tennessee =

- Census-designated place
- Location within Tennessee Location within the United States
- Coordinates: 35°12′11″N 85°15′13″W
- Country: United States
- State: Tennessee
- County: Hamilton

Area
  - Total: 5.01 sq mi (12.98 km^{2})
  - Land: 5.01 sq mi (12.98 km^{2})
  - Water: 0 sq mi (0.00 km^{2})
- Elevation: 689 ft (210 m)

Population (2020)
  - Total: 1,873
  - Density: 373.8/sq mi (144.31/km^{2})
- Time zone: UTC-5 (Eastern (EST))
  - Summer (DST): UTC-4 (EDT)
- Area code: 423
- GNIS feature ID: 1284092

Falling Water is a census-designated place and unincorporated community in Hamilton County, Tennessee, United States. Its population was 1,873 as of the 2020 Census, up from 1,232 at the 2010 census.

== Demographics ==
Historical population
Census	Pop.	Note	%±
2010	1,232		—
2020	1,873		52.0%
U.S. Decennial Census
