= Flat Top Mountain, Tennessee =

Census-designated place in Hamilton County, Tennessee

- Census-designated place
- Location within Tennessee Location within the United States
- Coordinates: 35°19′55″N 85°12′01″W
- Country: United States
- State: Tennessee
- County: Hamilton

Area
  - Total: 17.32 sq mi (44.87 km^{2})
  - Land: 17.32 sq mi (44.87 km^{2})
  - Water: 0 sq mi (0.00 km^{2})
- Elevation: 1,509 ft (460 m)

Population (2020)
  - Total: 561
  - Density: 32/sq mi (12.5/km^{2})
- Time zone: UTC-5 (Eastern (EST))
  - Summer (DST): UTC-4 (EDT)
- Area code: 423
- GNIS feature ID: 2584580

Flat Top Mountain is a census-designated place in Hamilton County, Tennessee, United States. Its population was 561 at the 2020 census, up from 422 at the 2010 census.

== Demographics ==
Historical population
Census	Pop.	Note	%±
2010	422		—
2020	561		32.9%
U.S. Decennial Census
