= Bakewell, Tennessee =

- Unincorporated community
- Location within Tennessee Location within the United States
- Coordinates: 35°20′36″N 85°07′59″W
- Country: United States
- State: Tennessee
- County: Hamilton
- Elevation: 742 ft (226 m)
- Time zone: UTC-5 (Eastern (EST))
  - Summer (DST): UTC-4 (EDT)
- ZIP code: 37304
- Area code: 423
- GNIS feature ID: 1304936

Bakewell is an unincorporated community in Hamilton County, Tennessee, United States. Bakewell is located along U.S. Route 27 and Tennessee State Route 29 23 miles (37 km) north-northeast of Chattanooga.
