= Mowbray Mountain, Tennessee =

- Census-designated place
- Location within Tennessee Location within the United States
- Coordinates: 35°16′31″N 85°13′21″W
- Country: United States
- State: Tennessee
- County: Hamilton

Area
  - Total: 20.22 sq mi (52.37 km^{2})
  - Land: 20.22 sq mi (52.37 km^{2})
  - Water: 0 sq mi (0.00 km^{2})
- Elevation: 1,660 ft (510 m)

Population (2020)
  - Total: 1,705
  - Density: 84.3/sq mi (32.56/km^{2})
- Time zone: UTC-5 (Eastern (EST))
  - Summer (DST): UTC-4 (EDT)
- Area code: 423
- GNIS feature ID: 2584586

Mowbray Mountain is a census-designated place in Hamilton County, Tennessee, United States. Its population was 1,705 as of the 2020 census, up from 1,615 as of the 2010 census.

== Demographics ==
Historical population
Census	Pop.	Note	%±
2010	1,615		—
2020	1,705		5.6%
U.S. Decennial Census
