= Hamilton County, Tennessee =

County in Tennessee, United States

- County
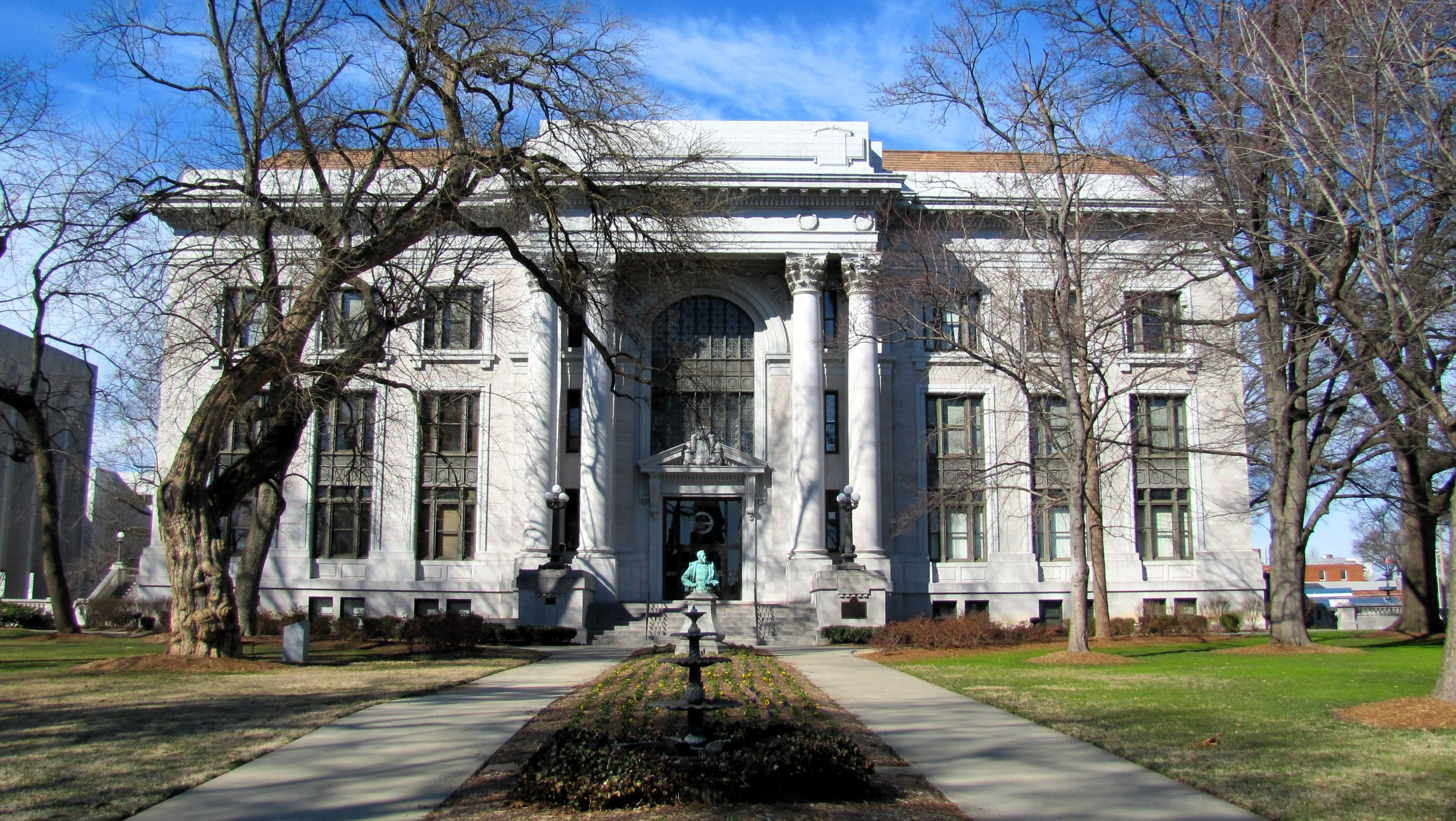
- Hamilton County Courthouse in Chattanooga

- Flag Seal

- Location within the U.S. state of Tennessee
- Coordinates: 35.18°N 85.17°W
- Country: United States
- State: Tennessee
- Founded: October 25, 1819
- Named for: Alexander Hamilton
- Seat: Chattanooga
- Largest city: Chattanooga

Government
  - County Mayor: Weston Wamp (R)

Area
  - Total: 576 sq mi (1,490 km^{2})
  - Land: 542 sq mi (1,400 km^{2})
  - Water: 33 sq mi (85 km^{2}) 5.8%

Population (2020)
  - Total: 366,207
  - Estimate (2025): 390,833 ▲
  - Density: 676/sq mi (261/km^{2})
- Time zone: UTC−5 (Eastern)
  - Summer (DST): UTC−4 (EDT)
- Congressional district: 3rd
- Website: www.hamiltontn.gov

Hamilton County is a county located in the U.S. state of Tennessee. It is located in the southern part of East Tennessee on the border with Georgia. As of the 2020 census, the population was 366,207, making it the fourth-most populous county in Tennessee. Its county seat is Chattanooga, located along the Tennessee River. The county was named for Alexander Hamilton, the first secretary of the treasury. Hamilton County is one of 95 counties within Tennessee. Hamilton County is part of the Chattanooga, TN–GA Metropolitan Statistical Area. The county was created on October 25, 1819. Hamilton County expanded to meet the state line with Georgia after absorbing parts of three different counties including Bledsoe, Marion, and Rhea. Part of the traditional Cherokee homeland, the county was created after the Cherokee signed a treaty in 1817 with the United States and ceded land north of the Hiwassee River. In the 21st century, Hamilton County is the eighth-highest income Tennessee location by per capita income ($26,588).

== History ==
For thousands of years, indigenous cultures occupied this region, especially along the rivers and creeks. The area was long occupied by the historic Cherokee Nation. In the early 19th century, it was being led by John Ross. The city that is now known as Chattanooga developed at Ross's Landing, a busy trading post recognized as the center of the Cherokee Nation. Over a series of treaties with the United States between 1819 and 1835, the Cherokee had been mostly moved out of the area.

If any Cherokee wished to stay in the area, the head of the family would have to leave the tribe and become an American citizen. Once a citizen, they would be entitled to 640 acres (260 ha) of land. At the time of death, the person's heirs would be entitled to the land. Of the 107 reservations reported to Congress in 1819, only 39 were listed as fee simple. The other 68 reservations were allowed to continue as long as the family stayed on the land. Once the family moved, the land could be sold. This provision made it easier to remove the Cherokee from the area. The 1835 Treaty of New Echota provided the U.S. government a legal basis for the forced removal of the Cherokee, opening their former lands for settlement. Some Cherokee leaders had agreed to this, in the belief that removal was inevitable and they could negotiate decent conditions for their people. The majority of the Cherokee opposed removal.

Hamilton County was formed on October 25, 1819, from portions of Rhea County and Cherokee land that was ceded to the U.S. It was named after Alexander Hamilton, an officer in the American Revolutionary War, member of the Continental Congress, the first U.S. secretary of treasury, and one of the Founding Fathers of the United States.

At the time of the 1820 census, the county counted 821 residents, including 16 blacks, 39 slaves, and about 100 Cherokee living on six reservations. The original legislature ruled that John Gamble, William Lauderdale, and Robert Patterson, the three men who were responsible for founding the county, would conduct all county business in the county seat. The original county seat was in the home of Hasten Poe, who owned a popular tavern located near those three men's farms. In 1822 the County Court was moved to the farm of Ashael Rawlings in Dallas, Tennessee; he was the newly appointed county clerk. After the county seat was moved to Harrison, the Dallas settlement declined. The county seat was finally moved to Chattanooga in 1870.

During the Civil War, Hamilton County was the site of an important saltpeter mine. This material is the main ingredient of gunpowder and was obtained by leaching the earth from caves. Lookout Mountain Cave was a major source of saltpeter during the Civil War. The mine was operated by Robert Cravens, who owned the surrounding property. In May 1861, Cravens contracted with the Tennessee Military and Financial Board to deliver 20,000 pounds (9,100 kg) of saltpeter. On May 24, he reported that he had ten hoppers already set up in his cave. Cravens was also mining Nickajack Cave in nearby Marion County. In 1862 he quit mining at Lookout Mountain Cave and rented the cave to the Confederate Nitre and Mining Bureau, which mined the cave from June 1862 through July 1863. This mining ceased when Chattanooga was occupied by federal forces in 1863. They stayed through the end of the war.

After the war, Tennessee rejoined the Union, and the state started to recover from the war. The long occupation had caused a breakdown in civil society. James County was established by the Tennessee General Assembly in January 1871 and was named after Jesse J. James. In early 1919 James County went bankrupt; it became a part of Hamilton County in April.

As of 2024, Hamilton County was the fourth-most populated county in the state, with a population of 386,256. The population growth rate was 5.3% from April 2020 to July 2024, or 1.25% per year over this period. Hamilton County has census records dating to the 1830s. The per-capita income of Hamilton County in 2023 was $43,484.

== Geography ==
According to the U.S. Census Bureau, the county has a total area of 576 square miles (1,490 km^{2}), of which 542 square miles (1,400 km^{2}) is land and 33 square miles (85 km^{2}) (5.8%) is water. Hamilton County is one of the few counties in the United States to border 10 other counties.

The county is in the Eastern Time Zone, but the three Tennessee counties that border it on the west (Bledsoe, Marion, and Sequatchie) observe Central Time.

=== Natural areas of interest ===
Raccoon Mountain Caverns is a show cave located 8 miles northwest of downtown Chattanooga. It was originally explored in 1929 by Leo Lambert who developed trails and installed lights and opened the cave to the public on June 28, 1931. The cave was opened under the name Tennessee Caverns. The operators of the cave claim that its explored length is over 5.5 miles (8.9 km).

The Crystal Caverns Cave Spider, Nesticus furtivus, is only known from this one cave. Cave guides will occasionally spot one of these rare spiders and point it out to tourists.

Ruby Falls Cave is a show cave located on the side of Lookout Mountain south of downtown Chattanooga. It was discovered by accident on December 28, 1928, when it was intersected by an elevator shaft that was being drilled to develop Lookout Mountain Cave as a commercial cave. Ruby Falls Cave was intersected at a depth of 260 feet from the surface and Lookout Mountain Cave was reached later at a depth of 420 feet below the surface. The entire project was the work of cave developer Leo Lambert. He named the new cave's waterfall after his wife Ruby. The lower cave, Lookout Mountain Cave, opened to the public on December 30, 1929. Ruby Falls opened to the public on June 16, 1930. Ruby Falls Cave, with its spectacular waterfall proved the more popular of the two caves and it is the only cave open to the public at the present time.

Areas such as Lookout Mountain including the famous Point Park, and Sunset Rock. Point Park is a national military park that is a tribute to the battle of Lookout mountain that took place during the American Civil War. Lookout Mountain was the area in which the last battle of the Cherokee Indians took place. It also as battlegrounds during the American Civil War and served as a base for General Ulysses S. Grant troops during the American Civil War. There are many other important areas to note on Lookout Mountain.

=== Adjacent counties ===
- Bledsoe County, Tennessee – north
- Rhea County, Tennessee – northeast
- Meigs County, Tennessee – northeast
- Bradley County, Tennessee – east
- Whitfield County, Georgia – southeast
- Catoosa County, Georgia – south
- Walker County, Georgia – south
- Dade County, Georgia – southwest
- Marion County, Tennessee – west
- Sequatchie County, Tennessee – northwest

=== National protected area ===
- Chickamauga and Chattanooga National Military Park (part)

=== State protected areas ===
- Booker T. Washington State Park
- Chickamauga Wildlife Management Area (part)
- Justin P. Wilson Cumberland Trail State Park (part)
- Falling Water Falls State Natural Area
- Harrison Bay State Park
- North Chickamauga Creek Gorge State Park (part)

=== Major highways ===
- I-24
- I-75
- I-124
- US 11
- US 27
- US 41
- US 64
- US 72
- US 74
- US 76
- US 127
- SR 2
- SR 8
- SR 17
- SR 27
- SR 58
- SR 60
- SR 111
- SR 153
- SR 312
- SR 317
- SR 318
- SR 319
- SR 320
- SR 321

== Demographics ==
Historical population
Census	Pop.	Note	%±
1820	821		—
1830	2,276		177.2%
1840	8,175		259.2%
1850	10,075		23.2%
1860	13,258		31.6%
1870	17,241		30.0%
1880	23,642		37.1%
1890	53,482		126.2%
1900	61,695		15.4%
1910	89,267		44.7%
1920	115,954		29.9%
1930	159,497		37.6%
1940	180,478		13.2%
1950	208,255		15.4%
1960	237,905		14.2%
1970	254,236		6.9%
1980	287,740		13.2%
1990	285,536		−0.8%
2000	307,896		7.8%
2010	336,463		9.3%
2020	366,207		8.8%
2025 (est.)	390,833	▲	6.7%
U.S. Decennial Census; 1790–1960 1900–1990; 1990–2000 2010 2020

=== Racial and ethnic composition ===
Hamilton County, Tennessee – Racial and ethnic composition Note: the US Census treats Hispanic/Latino as an ethnic category. This table excludes Latinos from the racial categories and assigns them to a separate category. Hispanics/Latinos may be of any race.
Race / Ethnicity (NH = Non-Hispanic)	Pop 1980	Pop 1990	Pop 2000	Pop 2010	Pop 2020	% 1980	% 1990	% 2000	% 2010	% 2020
White alone (NH)	228,650	226,239	232,475	242,154	249,939	79.46%	79.23%	75.50%	71.97%	68.25%
Black or African American alone (NH)	55,310	54,303	61,750	67,483	63,979	19.22%	19.02%	20.06%	20.06%	17.47%
Native American or Alaska Native alone (NH)	312	566	817	817	770	0.11%	0.20%	0.27%	0.24%	0.21%
Asian alone (NH)	971	2,416	3,905	5,855	8,139	0.34%	0.85%	1.27%	1.74%	2.22%
Native Hawaiian or Pacific Islander alone (NH)	x	x	108	150	131	x	x	0.04%	0.04%	0.04%
Other race alone (NH)	374	66	276	396	1,269	0.13%	0.02%	0.09%	0.12%	0.35%
Mixed race or Multiracial (NH)	x	x	3,084	4,615	14,905	x	x	1.00%	1.37%	4.07%
Hispanic or Latino (any race)	2,123	1,946	5,481	14,993	27,075	0.74%	0.68%	1.78%	4.46%	7.39%
Total	287,740	285,536	307,896	336,463	366,207	100.00%	100.00%	100.00%	100.00%	100.00%

=== 2020 census ===
As of the 2020 census, there were 366,207 people, 148,758 households, and 91,469 families residing in the county. The median age was 39.3 years; 21.0% of residents were under the age of 18 and 18.1% of residents were 65 years of age or older. For every 100 females there were 93.1 males, and for every 100 females age 18 and over there were 90.3 males age 18 and over.

The racial makeup of the county was 69.6% White, 17.6% Black or African American, 0.5% American Indian and Alaska Native, 2.2% Asian, <0.1% Native Hawaiian and Pacific Islander, 3.4% from some other race, and 6.6% from two or more races. Hispanic or Latino residents of any race comprised 7.4% of the population.

87.5% of residents lived in urban areas, while 12.5% lived in rural areas.

There were 148,758 households in the county, of which 27.5% had children under the age of 18 living in them. Of all households, 45.5% were married-couple households, 18.6% were households with a male householder and no spouse or partner present, and 29.7% were households with a female householder and no spouse or partner present. About 29.4% of all households were made up of individuals and 11.5% had someone living alone who was 65 years of age or older.

There were 162,268 housing units, of which 8.3% were vacant. Among occupied housing units, 63.2% were owner-occupied and 36.8% were renter-occupied. The homeowner vacancy rate was 1.7% and the rental vacancy rate was 8.9%.

=== 2010 census ===
As of the census of 2010, there were 336,463 people, 136,682 households, and 88,149 families residing in the county. The population density was 620.78 people per square mile. The racial makeup of the county was 74.75% White, 20.21% Black or African American, 0.35% Native American, 1.86% Asian, 0.09% Pacific Islander, and 1.46% from two or more races. Hispanics or Latinos of any race were 4.46% of the population.

Out of all of the households, 25.49% had children under the age of 18 living in them, 46.34% were married couples living together, 13.86% had a female householder with no husband present, 4.29% had a male householder with no wife present, and 35.51% were non-families. 29.35% of households were made up of individuals, and 10.34% had someone living alone who was 65 years of age or older. The average household size was 2.39, and the average family size was 2.95.

In the county, the population was spread out, with 21.58% under the age of 18, 63.73% ages 18 to 64, and 14.69% aged 65 and older. The media age was 39.3 years. 51.88% of the population were females, and 48.12% were males.

The median household income in the county was $46,544, and the median family income was $60,184. Males had a median income of $45,835 versus $34,342 for females. The per capita income for the county was $27,052. About 12.1% of families and 16.2% of the population were below the poverty line, including 24.5% of those under the age of 18 and 8.6% of those age 65 and over.

=== 2000 census ===
As of the census of 2000, there were 307,896 people, 124,444 households, and 83,750 families residing in the county. The population density was 568 inhabitants per square mile (219/km^{2}). There were 134,692 housing units at an average density of 248 units per square mile (96/km^{2}). The racial makeup of the county was 76.32% White, 20.14% Black or African American, 0.29% Native American, 1.27% Asian, 0.06% Pacific Islander, 0.77% from other races, and 1.14% from two or more races. 1.78% of the population were Hispanic or Latino of any race.

There were 124,444 households, out of which 28.90% had children under the age of 18 living with them, 50.20% were married couples living together, 13.50% had a female householder with no husband present, and 32.70% were non-families. 27.90% of all households were made up of individuals, and 10.00% had someone living alone who was 65 years of age or older. The average household size was 2.41 and the average family size was 2.95.

In the county, the population was spread out, with 23.20% under the age of 18, 9.60% from 18 to 24, 29.00% from 25 to 44, 24.30% from 45 to 64, and 13.80% who were 65 years of age or older. The median age was 37 years. For every 100 females there were 91.70 males. For every 100 females age 18 and over, there were 88.10 males.

The median income for a household in the county was $38,930, and the median income for a family was $48,037. Males had a median income of $35,413 versus $24,505 for females. The per capita income for the county was $21,593. About 9.20% of families and 12.10% of the population were below the poverty line, including 16.80% of those under age 18 and 11.20% of those age 65 or over.

== Government ==
=== Countywide elected officials ===
Office	Name
District Attorney	Coty Wamp (R)
County Mayor	Weston Wamp (R)
Sheriff	Austin Garrett (R)
Trustee	Bill Hullander (R)
Assessor of Property	Marty Haynes (R)
County Clerk	Bill Knowles (R)
Register of Deeds	Marc Gravitt (R)
Circuit Court Clerk	Larry Henry (R)

==== State elected offices ====
Hamilton County is represented in the Tennessee General Assembly by mainly Republicans. In the Tennessee Senate, the county is entirely represented by 2 Republican senators. In the Tennessee House of Representatives, 5 districts include portions of Hamilton County, with 4 Republicans and 1 Democrat serving as state representatives.

Office	Name
State Senator, District 10	Todd Gardenhire (R)
State Senator, District 11	Bo Watson (R)

Office	Name
State Representative, District 26	Greg Martin (R)
State Representative, District 27	Michele Reneau (R)
State Representative, District 28	Yusuf Hakeem (D)
State Representative, District 29	Greg Vital (R)
State Representative, District 30	Esther Helton-Haynes (R)

=== Executive branch ===
==== County mayor ====
The citizens of Hamilton County elect the mayor every four years. The current mayor is Weston Wamp, who has served since September 2022. The fourth mayor of Hamilton County, Mayor Wamp is the youngest person to ever hold the office.

The mayor serves as the head of the county's executive branch and as the county's chief fiscal officer. The mayor oversees the budget preparation process and administers the budget and financial reports and oversees the day-to-day operations of county government, including implementation of all laws and policies. The mayor also gives the county commission recommendations and keeps them up to date about the county's financial condition.

===== Previous county mayors =====
- Dalton Roberts (1978-1994)
- Claude Ramsey (1994-2011)
- Jim Coppinger (2011-2022)

===== Chief of Staff =====
The current chief of staff is Claire McVay.

The chief of staff is appointed by the mayor and is responsible for overseeing and coordinating all areas of county general government, and coordinating specific initiatives. The chief of staff also serves as a point of contact for the county commission and other elected officials. The office's main purpose is to assist the county mayor carry out his initiatives in an efficient and effective manner.

==== Other elected officials ====
The assessor of property is elected to find and list the value of all property in Hamilton County. Property is reappraised every four years. The current assessor of property is Marty Haynes.

The county clerk is elected to issue vehicle tags, marriage and business licenses, and other documents. The current county clerk is William (Bill) Knowles.

The register of deeds is elected to record deeds and other legal documents, including powers of attorney, mortgages, marriages, and military discharges. The register's office also collects and accounts for all fees and taxes. The current register of deeds is Marc Gravitt.

The county trustee is elected to act as the county government's treasurer, collect county property taxes, account for money regularly, and invest temporarily idle county funds. The current county trustee is Bill Hullander.

The county sheriff is elected to serve process, writs, keep the jail and prisoners so confined, conduct sheriff sales and secure the courthouse. The sheriff is also the principal conservator of peace and has a duty to enforce the law and ferret out crimes. The current sheriff is Austin Garrett.

==== County board of commissioners ====
Hamilton County Board of Commissioners by partisanship
All 11 districts 6 seats needed for a majority
	Majority party	Minority party
Party	Republican	Democratic
Seats	8	3
- As of 2026; Republican Democratic

Hamilton County has eleven elected county commissioners to make up the legislative body of the county. The citizens of Hamilton County elect commissioners for four year terms to represent their districts. The commission chooses from among its members commissioners to serve as the chairman and chairman pro tempore, the presiding officers for the commission. They each serve one year terms.

The board currently has a Republican majority, with 8 Republicans and 3 Democrats.

- District 1: Gene-O Shipley
- District 2: D.C. (Chip) Baker
- District 3: Ken Smith
- District 4: Warren Mackey
- District 5: Greg Beck
- District 6: David Sharpe
- District 7: Lee Helton
- District 8: Mike Chauncey
- District 9: Steve Highlander
- District 10: Jeff Eversole
- District 11: Joe Graham

=== County judicial system ===
All court clerks are elected by the citizens of Hamilton County.

==== District Attorney ====
The district attorney serves to prosecute all individuals who violate the criminal law in Hamilton County, which is made up of the 11th Judicial District of Tennessee. The office also prosecutes all felony, state misdemeanor, and juvenile delinquency cases brought before the Hamilton County Juvenile Court. It represents crime victims in victim compensation hearings and maintains and supervises the Victim Witness Assistance Program.

The current district attorney is Coty Wamp, having been elected to an 8-year term in 2022. Previously serving as the general counsel for the Hamilton County sheriff's office, Wamp is the first female to ever hold the office.

==== Chancery Court ====
The Chancery Court hears cases involving civil matters, including domestic relations, worker's compensation, estates, trusts, contracts, review of administrative action of governmental agencies and boards, collection of delinquent taxes, guardianships, and conservatorships, dissolution of partnerships and corporations, enforcement of liens, boundary lines, breach of contract, fraud, election contests, and other matters of a civil nature. The current chancellors are Pamela Fleenor and Jeffrey Atherton.

The clerk and master handles fees and paperwork associated with the court and sometimes serves as a chancellor.

==== Circuit Court ====
The circuit court hears both criminal and civil cases, including adoption and divorce matters, contract disputes, name changes, as well as hearing appeals from lower courts. The current circuit court judges are J.B. Bennett, Michael Dumitru, Marie Williams, and Kyle Hedrick.

The circuit court clerk handles the paperwork and fees associated with this court. The current circuit court clerk is Larry Henry.

==== Criminal Court ====
The criminal court handles both felony and misdemeanor cases. Cases are brought to the criminal court after a grand jury issues an indictment, or after an appeal is granted from a lower court. Trials in this court are typically have juries, however, a judge may hear a case without a jury. The current criminal court judges are Barry Steelman, Tom Greenholtz, and Don Poole.

The criminal court clerk is responsible for maintaining the records of the court. The court clerk's office is divided into three divisions: criminal division of the general sessions courts, the delinquent collection division, and the criminal courts. The current court clerk is Vince Dean.

==== General Sessions Court ====
The general sessions court is composed of two divisions: civil and criminal. The civil division has limited jurisdiction with no jury trials. A person may represent her/himself without an attorney. The criminal division only issues judgments for misdemeanor criminal cases and traffic offenses. It only has jurisdiction for felony cases on a preliminary hearing basis to determine if there is sufficient cause for the case to be bound over to the grand jury. There are generally no juries in this division, either.

The current judges are Christie Mahn Sell, Tori Smith, Larry Ables, Lila Statom, and Gary Starnes. The court shares clerks with the criminal court and circuit court.

==== Juvenile Court ====
The juvenile court handles all cases which involve a minor. Children are referred to the juvenile court for reasons of delinquency, status offenses, and dependency and neglect issues. The current juvenile court judge is Robert Philyaw. He is supported in his work by magistrates that serve in the court. They are Cynthia LeCroy-Schemel, Troy McDougal, and Chris Gott in the juvenile court and Kathy Clark, Chris Albright, and Marsha Smith in the child support division.

The juvenile court clerk is elected for a four-year term by the citizens. The clerk maintains and files all paperwork and fees for this court. They also act as a collection agent for the state to process child support. The current juvenile court clerk is Gary Behler.

Hamilton County has an elected sheriff. Recent past sheriffs:

- Jerry Pitts 1976–78
- H.Q. Evatt 1978–94
- John Cupp 1994–2006
- Billy Long 2006–08 (guilty of extortion, money laundering, drug and gun charges)
- Jim Hammond 2008–2022
- Austin Garrett 2022–present

==== Education governance ====
Hamilton County Board of Education by partisanship
All 11 districts 6 seats needed for a majority
	Majority party	Minority party
Party	Republican	Democratic
Seats	7	4
- As of 2026; Republican Democratic

Public education in Hamilton County is overseen by the Hamilton County Board of Education. The board consists of eleven members elected from single‑member districts across the county, with each member serving a four year term. Members are residents of the districts they represent and are elected by voters within those districts. Members represent all areas of Hamilton County, including Chattanooga and its suburbs, and make policy decisions that apply to the entire school system.

The board’s responsibilities include setting district policies, approving the annual school system budget, appointing and supervising the Superintendent of Schools, and adopting goals and strategic priorities to guide the direction of the school district.

The district is led by a superintendent, currently Dr. Justin Robertson, who implements board policies and oversees the administration of the county’s public schools.

The board currently has a Republican majority, with 7 Republicans and 4 Democrats.

- Steve Slater (District 1)
- Ben Daugherty (District 2)
- Joe Smith (District 3)
- Jackie Anderson Thomas (District 4)
- Karitsa Jones (District 5)
- Ben Connor (District 6)
- Jodi Schaffer (District 7)
- Larry Grohn (District 8)
- Gary Kuehn (District 9)
- Felice Hadden (District 10)
- Jill Black (District 11)

Hamilton County Schools is the largest school district in the state, serving tens of thousands of students across dozens of elementary, middle, and high schools.

== Politics ==
United States presidential election results for Hamilton County, Tennessee
Year	Republican		Democratic		Third party(ies)	
Year	No.	%	No.	%	No.	%
1880	2,460	58.96%	1,595	38.23%	117	2.80%
1884	3,827	60.56%	2,439	38.60%	53	0.84%
1888	6,264	60.63%	3,906	37.81%	161	1.56%
1892	3,196	43.54%	3,762	51.25%	382	5.20%
1896	4,468	53.10%	3,729	44.32%	217	2.58%
1900	3,943	52.66%	3,188	42.57%	357	4.77%
1904	3,849	51.37%	3,287	43.87%	357	4.76%
1908	4,250	46.64%	4,564	50.08%	299	3.28%
1912	1,493	17.32%	4,394	50.96%	2,735	31.72%
1916	4,697	43.66%	5,828	54.17%	234	2.17%
1920	10,793	51.30%	9,910	47.11%	334	1.59%
1924	8,421	50.18%	7,511	44.76%	848	5.05%
1928	13,244	64.49%	7,190	35.01%	103	0.50%
1932	7,090	37.44%	11,469	60.56%	378	2.00%
1936	6,917	29.32%	16,568	70.24%	104	0.44%
1940	9,771	36.29%	17,083	63.45%	68	0.25%
1944	10,379	36.84%	17,527	62.21%	267	0.95%
1948	10,434	34.56%	16,968	56.21%	2,787	9.23%
1952	29,681	55.14%	23,832	44.27%	317	0.59%
1956	34,429	53.11%	28,287	43.63%	2,114	3.26%
1960	39,703	55.70%	30,482	42.77%	1,092	1.53%
1964	40,200	51.05%	38,546	48.95%	0	0.00%
1968	29,302	34.54%	23,441	27.64%	32,080	37.82%
1972	58,469	70.62%	20,657	24.95%	3,668	4.43%
1976	47,969	50.80%	45,348	48.03%	1,104	1.17%
1980	57,575	56.40%	41,913	41.05%	2,604	2.55%
1984	69,626	62.38%	41,449	37.13%	547	0.49%
1988	68,111	62.08%	40,990	37.36%	608	0.55%
1992	53,476	46.47%	46,770	40.64%	14,839	12.89%
1996	55,205	49.81%	48,008	43.32%	7,618	6.87%
2000	66,605	55.33%	51,708	42.95%	2,066	1.72%
2004	78,547	57.36%	57,302	41.85%	1,087	0.79%
2008	81,702	55.19%	64,246	43.40%	2,086	1.41%
2012	79,933	56.39%	58,836	41.51%	2,972	2.10%
2016	78,733	55.29%	55,316	38.84%	8,359	5.87%
2020	92,108	53.83%	75,522	44.14%	3,483	2.04%
2024	97,195	55.72%	74,437	42.67%	2,806	1.61%

Politically, Hamilton County is conservative. Along with the rest of East Tennessee, it has been supportive of the Republican party since the Civil War, even as the rest of the Solid South voted staunchly Democratic. However, unlike most counties in East Tennessee, Hamilton County is a strong two party county, with the Democratic candidate usually receiving at least 40% of the popular vote in presidential elections, and the city of Chattanooga tending to lean Democratic. In 2004, Republican George Bush defeated Democrat John Kerry 57% to 41%. The last Democrat to win the county was Harry S. Truman in 1948, although George Wallace did win a plurality in 1968.

In 2008, Republican John McCain defeated Democrat Barack Obama by a slightly smaller margin of 55% to 43%. In 2012, Republican Mitt Romney defeated incumbent Obama by a margin of 56% to 42%. Four years later in 2016, in businessman Donald Trump's sweep of Appalachia, Hamilton County furnished the GOP with a mildly increased margin of 55.3% to 38.8% for Secretary of State Hillary Clinton. In 2020, Joe Biden received the highest percentage of the popular vote of any Democratic presidential candidate since Jimmy Carter in 1976. In 2024, the county backed Trump with 55.7% of the vote to 42.7% for Vice President Kamala Harris.

=== Recent local elections ===
- 2018 Hamilton County, Tennessee mayoral election
- 2022 Hamilton County, Tennessee mayoral election
- Mayoral elections in Chattanooga, Tennessee

== Education ==
=== Colleges and universities ===
- Chattanooga State Community College – website
- Southern Adventist University – website
- University of Tennessee at Chattanooga – website
- Richmont Graduate University – website

=== Public schools ===
Public schools in Hamilton County are operated by Hamilton County Schools.

== Communities ==
=== Cities ===
- Chattanooga (county seat)
- Collegedale
- East Ridge
- Lakesite
- Red Bank
- Ridgeside
- Soddy-Daisy

=== Towns ===
- Lookout Mountain
- Signal Mountain
- Walden

=== Census-designated places ===
- Apison
- Fairmount
- Falling Water
- Flat Top Mountain
- Harrison
- Middle Valley
- Mowbray Mountain
- Ooltewah
- Sale Creek

=== Unincorporated communities ===
- Bakewell
- Balmoral
- Birchwood (partial)
- East Brainerd
- Georgetown (partial)
- Shady Grove

== See also ==
- National Register of Historic Places listings in Hamilton County, Tennessee
