= Tennessee State Route 153 =

Highway in Tennessee

State Route 153
- SR 153 highlighted in red

Route information
- Maintained by TDOT and TVA
- Length: 12.87 mi (20.71 km)

Major junctions
- South end: I-75 in Chattanooga
- US 11 / US 64 in Chattanooga; SR 58 / SR 17 in Chattanooga; SR 319 in Chattanooga
- North end: US 27 in Chattanooga

Location
- Country: United States
- State: Tennessee
- Counties: Hamilton

Highway system
- Tennessee State Routes; Interstate; US; State
← SR 152	→ SR 154

State Route 153 (SR 153) is a north–south primary state highway in Chattanooga, Tennessee. It runs 12.87 miles (20.71 km) from Interstate 75 (I-75) a few miles east of the I-24 interchange, to U.S. Route 27 just south of Soddy-Daisy. The route serves as a bypass around downtown Chattanooga for I-75 travelers heading towards US 27 north. It is also an important route for drivers from Soddy-Daisy, Hixson, and other parts of northwestern Hamilton County who are heading for I-75 and the eastern half of the county. The entire route is a four-to-six lane divided highway, and the southern half is controlled access. SR 153 is also an important link to the Tennessee Valley Authority's Chickamauga Dam on the Tennessee River, which the highway crosses on the Wilkes T. Thrasher Bridge. It also serves as the primary access to the Chattanooga Metropolitan Airport.

== Route description ==
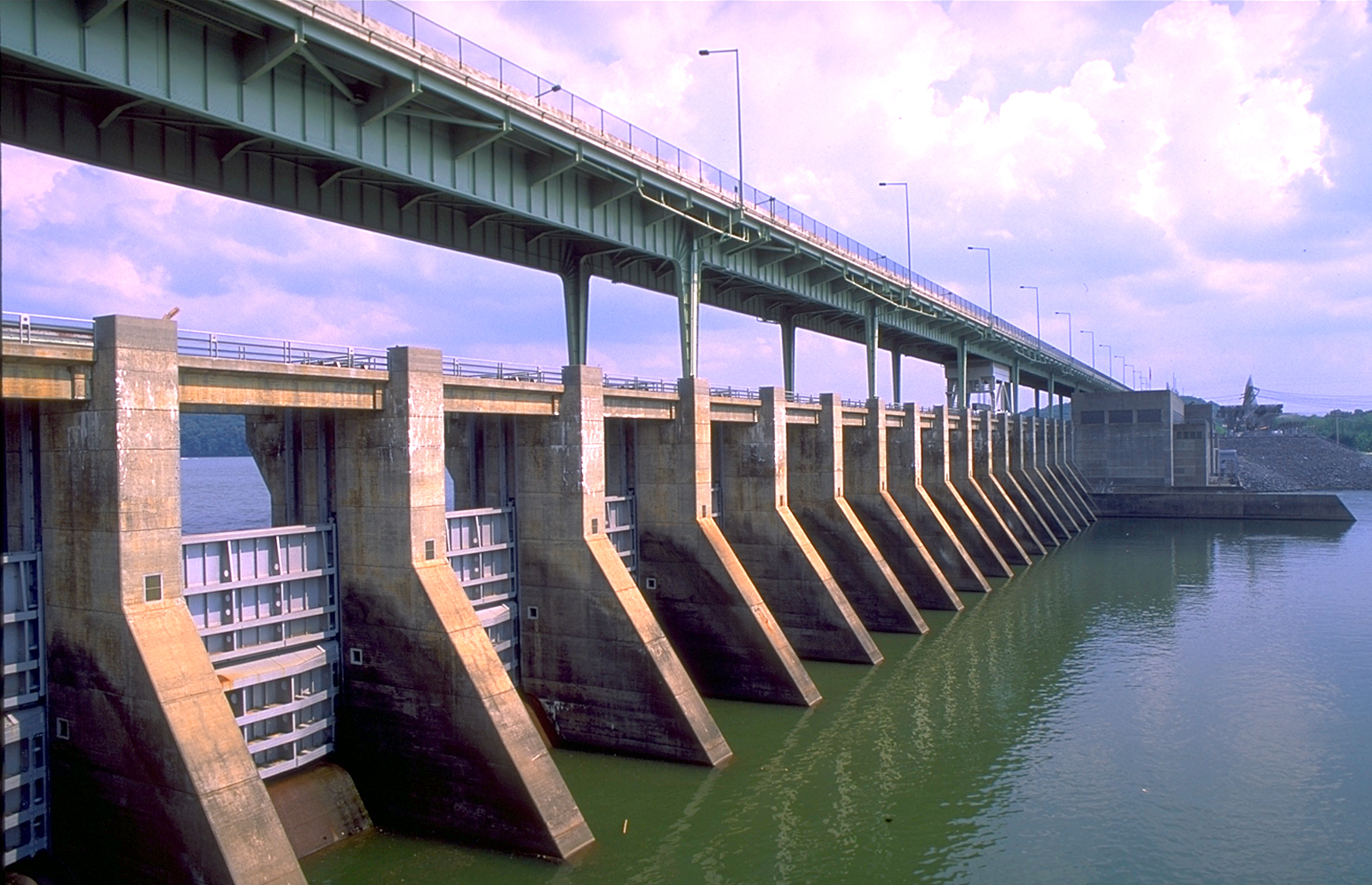
The Wilkes T. Thrasher Bridge atop the Chickamauga Dam

The entire length of SR 153 is part of the National Highway System, a national network of highways identified as important to the nation's economy, mobility, and defense.

SR 153 begins in Chattanooga as a six-lane freeway at a directional-T stack interchange with I-75 in Chattanooga, just north of its interchange with I-24. Here, ramps provide direct access to SR 320 (East Brained Road) and Hamilton Place Boulevard from SR 153 southbound. The highway then goes west to have a diamond interchange with US 11/US 64 (Lee Highway) before turning northwest into a long straightaway. It then has a diamond interchange with Shepard Road and then another with Shallowford Road a short distance later, both of which provide access to Chattanooga Metropolitan Airport. SR 153 continues northwest to a diamond interchange with Jersey Pike, then curves slightly northwest at a partial cloverleaf interchange with SR 317 (Bonny Oaks Drive) about 1/2 mile (0.80 km) later. It then has another partial cloverleaf with the northern terminus of SR 17 and SR 58. It then has a partial cloverleaf with the southern terminus of SR 319 (Amnicola Highway), where it narrows to four lanes. SR 153 then veers north and crosses the Tennessee River on the Wilkes T. Thrasher Bridge atop the Chickamauga Dam.

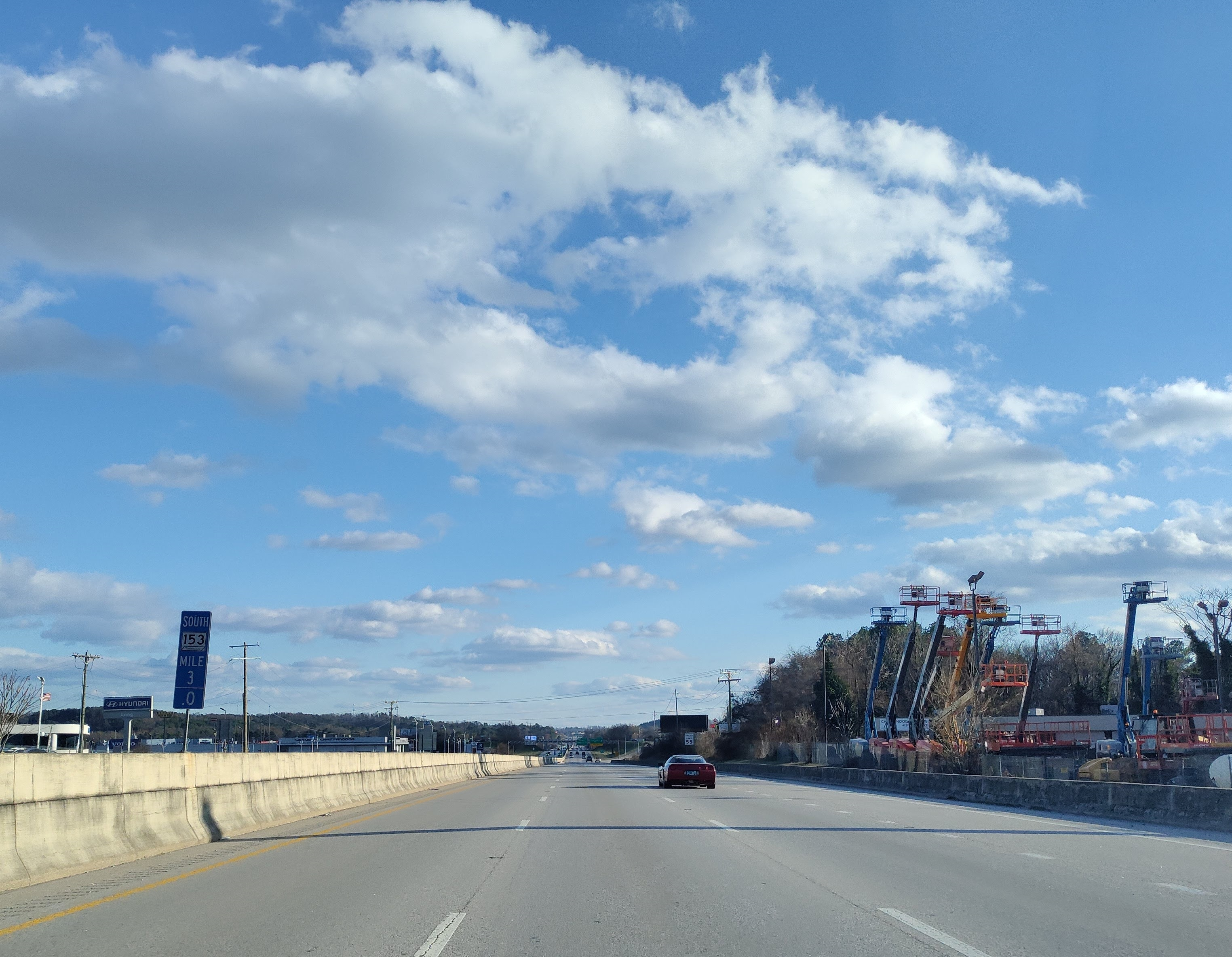
SR 153 southbound between Jersey Pike and Shallowford Road

Upon crossing the river, the highway immediately has an interchange with an access road to the river and dam, and curves northwest, where the freeway ends. Widening back to a six lanes, the highway enters Hixson and has intersections with SR 319 (Dupont Parkway) again, this time becoming concurrent with this route. The two routes pass through a commercial area anchored by Northgate Mall to the east, providing access via multiple surface streets. SR 319 (Hixson Pike) then separates once again at a cloverleaf interchange, and SR 153 continues northwest through a central retail district. The highway then turns north into a straightaway and leaves Hixson. A few miles later the route reduces back to four lanes, and Dayton Pike, the original alignment of US 27, merges into SR 153 from the southwest in a partial-Y interchange. This road is only accessible from the southbound lanes. About 1/2 mile (0.80 km) later, SR 153 ends at a partial cloverleaf interchange with US 27, with the road continuing to the north as Dayton Pike into Soddy Daisy.

== History ==
=== Background and construction ===
The first section of what is now SR 153 was the northernmost 1/2 mile (0.80 km) section that is part of what was originally the main road between Chattanooga and Dayton. In 1914, this road became part of the Dixie Highway, an auto trail connecting the Southern United States with the Midwest. This road was designated as SR 29 with the establishment of the state highway system in 1923, and US 27 in 1927, one year after the U.S. Numbered Highway System was approved.

The Chickamauga Dam was constructed by the Tennessee Valley Authority (TVA) from 1936 to 1940 to provide electricity, flood control, and improved navigation to the region. Workers constructed 1.77-mile (2.85 km) North Access Road to Hixson Pike on the north shore, and 2.33-mile (3.75 km) South Access Road on the south side to SR 58; part of this road later became a frontage road along SR 153. While the dam did not initially contain a bridge, it was designed to allow for one to be constructed. TVA would initially agree to construct a bridge only if it were tied into a more extensive system of highways. While the dam was under construction, the Tennessee Department of Highways (predecessor agency to TDOT) began studying the possibility of constructing a bridge across the dam to connect US 11 and US 27. On January 18, 1940, Tennessee Congressman (and later Senator) Estes Kefauver proposed an amendment to a TVA appropriations bill that would have provided funding for a bridge across the dam, but the whole house rejected this. From 1947 to 1949, Hamilton County Judge Wilkes T. Thrasher made several trips to Washington, D.C. requesting federal funding and approval of the bridge. On July 31, 1947, Kefauver announced that the Public Roads Administration (predecessor to the Federal Highway Administration) had approved the bridge. The federal government agreed to provide funding when Thrasher downgraded his request from four to two lanes on the bridge. Construction on the bridge approaches began on November 21, 1949, and work on the concrete bridge piers began one year later. Completion of the bridge was initially slated for late 1951, but was repeatedly delayed by steel shortages. As a result, construction on the steel piers and beams did not begin until August 1953. Steel erection was completed on March 31, 1954, and the bridge was dedicated and opened to traffic on October 15, 1954, in a ceremony officially naming it for Thrasher. The bridge was constructed with two traffic lanes and sidewalks, but was designed to be expanded to four lanes. It was officially christened the "Wilkes T. Thrasher Bridge" in a ceremony on July 1, 1955.

While the bridge across the dam was under construction, the local and state governments began planning for a four-lane highway that would connect US 41 in East Ridge near the Georgia state line to US 27 in Red Bank, and serve as a bypass around downtown Chattanooga, relieving congestion on bridges across the Tennessee River there. In addition, this route was planned to serve the rapidly developing industrial areas along the Tennessee River, as well as the Volunteer Ordnance Works ammunition plant, the Chattanooga Metropolitan Airport (then Lovell Field), and the suburban neighborhoods along the route which had recently begun to develop. The route was also expected to relieve traffic on SR 317 (then SR 2A), which was expected to become congested once the bridge across the dam was completed. On August 1, 1953, the Hamilton County government announced that they had chosen the route for the stretch between SR 317 and US 27 out of two proposed alignments. This highway was officially incorporated into the state highway system as SR 153 in 1954.

Construction of the section between the Chickamauga Dam and US 27 began on May 2, 1955, and was completed on December 27, 1957. The 1.2-mile (1.9 km) section between SR 317 and south of the dam was let on November 16, 1956. The portion between the SR 58 interchange and the dam, which contained at-grade intersections, opened in late November 1957, and the rest of the segment extending to SR 317 was completed by August 1958. The sections north of the river, with the exception of the portion through the Hixson Pike interchange and the approach to US 27, were constructed with two lanes and designed to be expanded to four. Due to higher-than-anticipated traffic volumes, a decision was made in September 1958 for the remainder of SR 153 to be controlled access. On August 25, 1961, a contract was awarded to convert the at-grade intersection with US 27 (Dayton Boulevard) to an interchange. The authorization of the Interstate Highway System in June 1956 resulted in the need to reevaluate the plans for SR 153 to extend to US 41, and by January 1959, plans were changed for the route to terminate at I-75 instead. The contract for the section between I-75 and SR 317 was scheduled to be bid in December 1961, but was delayed one month before then after a disagreement arose over the clearance of a railroad bridge. The contract was finally awarded on August 31, 1962, and construction was completed in late 1964.

=== Later history ===
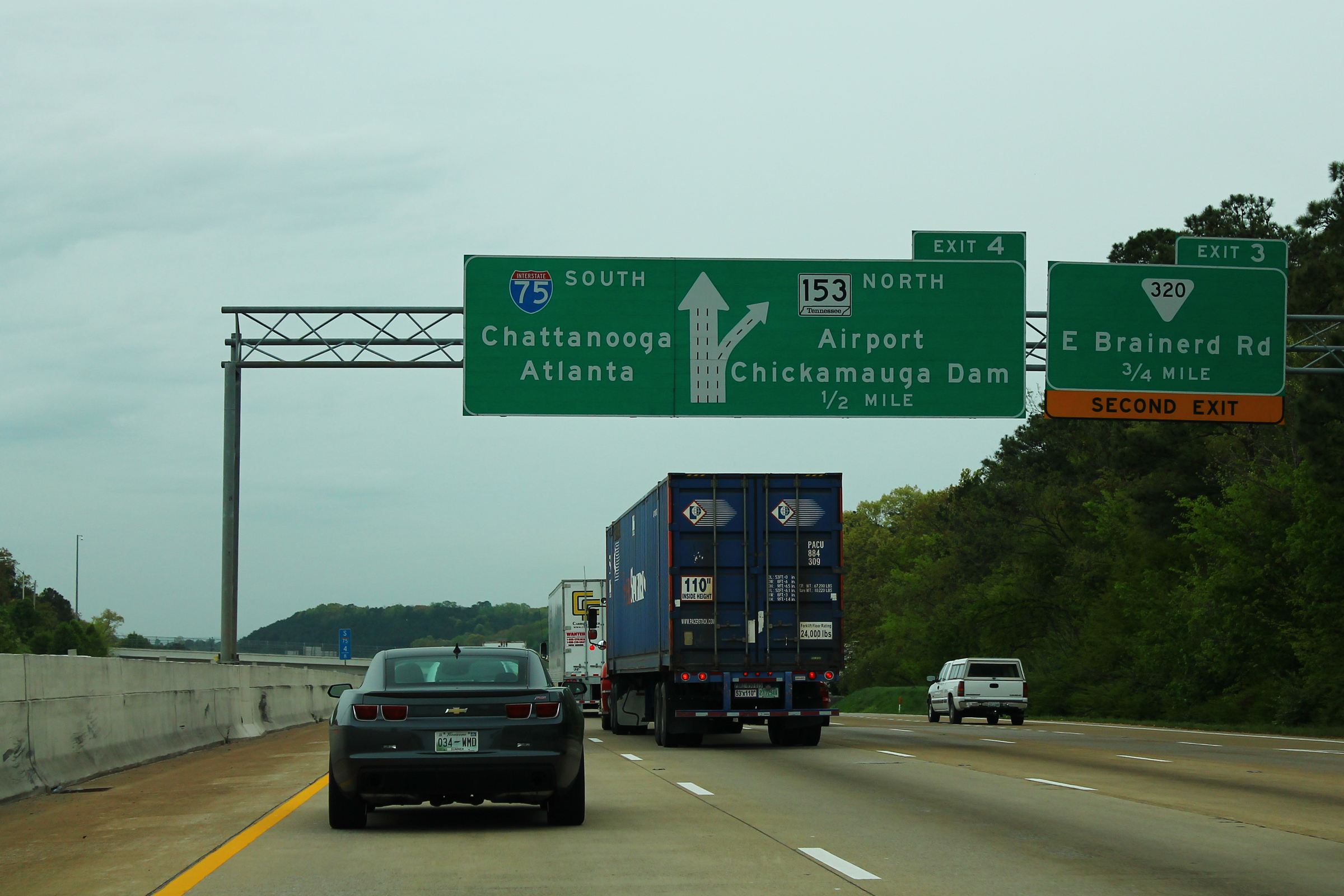
Sign for SR 153 on I-75 southbound

The intersection with Amnicola Highway was converted into a cloverleaf interchange in 1964-65. In March 1957, it was reported that a project to widen the Thrasher Bridge to four lanes had been included in the state's 5-year highway program and would take place in 1961. However, the project, which required a complete closure of the bridge to all traffic, was repeatedly delayed. During this time, this section developed into a severe congestion bottleneck, and locals came to refer to the Thrasher Bridge as the "Damn Bridge". On May 22, 1981, the C.B. Robinson Bridge across the Tennessee River on SR 319 (DuPont Parkway), located approximately two miles (3.2 km) downstream, opened to traffic, providing a detour route for the Thrasher Bridge. The widening project was administered by TVA, with funding from TDOT and the FHWA, and began with a closure of the bridge in December 1982. In August 1983, TDOT awarded a contract to widen the 1.1-mile (1.8 km) northern approach to the dam. On September 24, 1984, the bridge reopened in a dedication ceremony attended by several federal, state, and local leaders.

When the four-lane controlled-access alignment of US 27 that replaced the old Dayton Pike was constructed in the mid-to-late 1970s, the SR 153 designation was extended approximately 1/2 mile (0.80 km) north along this route to the new freeway. The stretch between north of Hixson Pike and south of Dayton Boulevard was widened to four lanes in the early 1990s. In the mid-1990s, the sections between DuPont Parkway and Hixson Pike, and from Hixson Pike to north of Gadd, were widened to six lanes. The six-lane section was extended north to near Grubb Road in the mid-2000s.

In September 1998, construction began on a project to reconfigure the interchange between I-75 and SR 153. This project included widening I-75, reconfiguring the I-75 mainline to remove left-hand connections from I-75 northbound to the SR 153 ramps, construction of new flyover bridges for the ramps between the two routes, and providing direct access to the SR 320 and Hamilton Place Boulevard interchanges on I-75 via the ramps to I-75. The project was completed in 2001, after multiple delays. In August 2000, construction began on a project to widen the 5.5-mile (8.9 km) section of SR 153 between I-75 and SR 319. Initially slated to take two years, the project experienced multiple delays, leading TDOT to penalize the contractor in September 2003. The project was finally completed in August 2004.

== Junction list ==
The entire route is in Chattanooga, Hamilton County.

mi	km	Exit	Destinations	Notes
0.00– 0.46	0.00– 0.74	0	I-75 (US 74) – Knoxville, Chattanooga, Atlanta	I-75 exit 3; southern terminus; south end of freeway; direct access to SR 320 (East Brained Road) and Hamilton Place Boulevard from SR 153 southbound
0.98	1.58	1	US 11 / US 64 (Lee Highway/SR 2)	
1.68	2.70	1A	Shepard Road – Chattanooga Metropolitan Airport	
2.50	4.02	2	Shallowford Road	
3.27	5.26	3	Jersey Pike	Exit for the Tennessee Valley Railroad Museum on Cromwell Road
3.96	6.37	4	SR 317 (Bonny Oaks Drive)	
4.64	7.47	5A	SR 58 north – Harrison, Decatur	Also exit to Booker T. Washington and Harrison Bay State Parks
4.64	7.47	5B	SR 17 south	
5.57	8.96	6	SR 319 north – Downtown Chattanooga	Last numbered interchange
6.47– 7.11	10.41– 11.44	Wilkes T. Thrasher Bridge over the Tennessee River		
7.25	11.67	–	Access Road; Lake Resort Drive	
8.03– 8.12	12.92– 13.07	–	SR 319 south	Southern end of SR 319 concurrency; north end of freeway
8.94	14.39	–	SR 319 north (Hixson Pike) – Hixson, Middle Valley, Lakesite	Northern end of SR 319 concurrency; interchange
8.94	14.39	–	South Hixson Pike	Interchange
12.39	19.94	–	Dayton Blvd – Red Bank	Interchange; no access for northbound SR 153
12.87	20.71	–	US 27 (SR 29) to SR 111 – Chattanooga, Dayton	Northern terminus; roadway continues north as Dayton Pike to Soddy-Daisy
1.000 mi = 1.609 km; 1.000 km = 0.621 mi: Concurrency terminus; Incomplete access
