= Tennessee State Route 319 =

Highway in Tennessee

State Route 319
- SR 319 highlighted in red

Route information
- Maintained by TDOT
- Length: 22.2 mi (35.7 km)
- Existed: July 1, 1983–present

Major junctions
- South end: SR 153 at Chattanooga
- To: US 27 at Soddy-Daisy

Location
- Country: United States
- State: Tennessee
- Counties: Hamilton

Highway system
- Tennessee State Routes; Interstate; US; State
← SR 318	→ SR 320

State Route 319 (SR 319) is a state highway in southeast Tennessee, starting at the intersection of SR 153 in Chattanooga, traveling to the area of Soddy-Daisy where it intersects with US 27, and the route comes to an end.

== Route description ==
SR 319 begins on the northeast side of Chattanooga at SR 153 as a segment of Amnicola Highway. SR 319 then turns north as DuPont Parkway to have an interchange with Access Road and Hixson Pike. It then turns east, junctions with SR 153, turns back north along SR 153 and begins a very short 0.7-mile (1.1 km)-long concurrency. It again interchanges and becomes concurrent with Hixson Pike, turning northeast and leaving Chattanooga/Hixson 3.7 miles (6.0 km) from SR 153. SR 319 then enters the community of Middle Valley and after 3.3 miles (5.3 km) it leaves Middle Valley corporate limits and enters the city of Lakesite. In this area it turns back and forth from east to north. After it leaves Lakesite it passes the Sequoyah Nuclear Plant, turns northwest, and enters the Soddy-Daisy city limits to end at US 27/SR 29.

== Junction list ==
The entire route is in Hamilton County.

Location	mi	km	Destinations	Notes
Chattanooga			SR 153 / I-75 – Chattanooga Metropolitan Airport, Harrison	Southern terminus; SR 153 Exit 6
Chattanooga			Amnicola Highway	Southern end of freeway (DuPont Parkway)
Tennessee River			C.B. Robinson Bridge (DuPont Bridge)	
Chattanooga			Access Road; Hixson Pike	Interchange
Chattanooga			SR 153 south to I-75 – Chattanooga Metropolitan Airport, Chickamauga Dam	Southern end of overlap with SR 153; partial interchange; northern end of freeway (DuPont Parkway)
Chattanooga			SR 153 north – Falling Water, Soddy-Daisy	Northern end of overlap with SR 153
Soddy-Daisy			US 27 (SR 29) – Chattanooga, Dayton	Northern terminus; interchange
Soddy-Daisy			Dayton Pike – Soddy-Daisy	
1.000 mi = 1.609 km; 1.000 km = 0.621 mi: Concurrency terminus
