= Tennessee State Route 320 =

State highway in Tennessee, United States

State Route 320
- East Brainerd Road
- SR 320 highlighted in red

Route information
- Maintained by TDOT
- Length: 7.3 mi (11.7 km)
- Existed: July 1, 1983–present

Major junctions
- West end: US 11 / US 64 in Chattanooga
- I-75 / US 74 in Chattanooga
- East end: SR 321 in East Brainerd

Location
- Country: United States
- State: Tennessee

Highway system
- Tennessee State Routes; Interstate; US; State
← SR 319	→ US 321

State Route 320 (SR 320) is a west-east state highway located entirely in Hamilton County in southeastern Tennessee. it traverses mainly the eastern portions of the county, including Chattanooga’s eastern outskirts and the census designated place of East Brainerd.

== Route description ==
SR 320 is known as East Brainerd Road its entire length, and begins at an intersection with Lee Highway (US 11/64/SR 2) near the Chattanooga Metropolitan Airport. From here SR 320 travels eastward as a two lane road to traverse the I-75 Exit 3 interchange, where it widens to five lanes, including a center turn lane. SR 320 continues eastward through the community of East Brainerd, before ending at a four-way intersection with SR 321 just south of Collegedale. Although the state route designation ends at this point, a county maintained road also labeled as East Brainerd Road continues east to SR 317 in Apison, and some maps show this portion as part of SR 320.

== History ==
The interchange between I-75 and SR 320 was originally a full cloverleaf interchange. The loop ramps on southbound I-75 were removed as part of project between late 1998 and early 2001 that reconfigured the interchange between I-75 and nearby SR 153 and moved the southbound off-ramp from I-75 and SR 320 north of the SR 153 southbound merge, eliminating a hazardous curve and weaving motion.

In 2013, the northbound off-ramp from I-75 onto SR 320 eastbound was reconfigured from a direct merge into SR 320 into a signalized with this route, eliminating a weaving motion and providing two right turn lanes.

After years of planning, TDOT began work on a project to widen the section between east of Graysville Road and east of Bel-Air Road from two to five lanes in early 2015. Initially slated for completion in June 2017, the project ran into multiple delays caused by utility relocation complications. The next phase will expand the road to five lanes from east of Bel-Air Road to east of SR 321, and include improvements to SR 321 through the intersection between the two routes.

== Major intersections ==
The entire route is in Hamilton County.

Location	mi	km	Destinations	Notes
Chattanooga	0.0	0.0	US 11 / US 64 (Lee Highway/SR 2) – Downtown, Tyner, Ooltewah	Western terminus
Chattanooga			I-75 / US 74 – Knoxville, Atlanta, GA	I-75/US 74 exit 3 southbound, exit 3 A/B northbound
East Brainerd			SR 321 (Ooltewah Ringgold Road) – Ringgold, GA, Collegedale, Ooltewah	Eastern terminus
1.000 mi = 1.609 km; 1.000 km = 0.621 mi
