= Dallas Bay Skypark =

- IATA: none; ICAO: none; FAA LID: 1AA0

Summary
- Airport type: Private
- Owner: Aviation Integrated Resource Inc.
- Serves: Lakesite, Tennessee
- Location: Middle Valley, Tennessee
- Elevation AMSL: 690 ft (210 m)
- Coordinates: 35°11′15″N 085°10′40″W

Map
- Location of airport in Tennessee

Runways
Direction	Length		Surface
Direction	ft	m	Surface
5/23	3,025	922	Asphalt

Statistics (1998)
- Aircraft operations: 10,108
- Source: Federal Aviation Administration

Dallas Bay Skypark (FAA LID: 1AA0) is a private-use airport located 11 miles (18 km) north of the central business district of Chattanooga and 4 miles SW of the central business district of Lakesite (both cities in Hamilton County, Tennessee, United States). It is located in the community of Middle Valley with a Hixson, Tennessee mailing address.

== History ==
Dallas Bay Skypark began as the Optimist Club Drag Strip back in the late 50s, and survived until the early 60s. The dragstrip was moved to East Ridge. John Flewellen and his family bought the old dragstrip and turned it into a private runway. In the early 1970s the airstrip became an FAA-certified public airport with the designation 1A0.

In 2002, a group of investors with a passion for flying, bought Dallas Bay Skypark and ran it until its closure in 2021. The airport was a full-service public airport with a flight school on premises.

In April 2021, the airport owners notified tenants that the airport would close before the end of the year.

== Facilities and aircraft ==
Dallas Bay Skypark covers an area of 60 acres (24 ha) which contains one asphalt paved runway (5/23) measuring 3,025 x 50 ft (922 x 15 m).

For the 12-month period ending May 4, 1998, the airport had 10,108 aircraft operations, 100% of which were general aviation.

Dallas Bay Skypark ceased public operations at the end of 2021—ending commercial activities and public-access landings/takeoffs. After closure, legal disputes began over land rights and access easements. The Tennessee Department of Transportation (TDOT) did not renew the public license for Dallas Bay Skypark, citing safety hazards, such as obstacles (notably tall trees at the runway approach), and financial infeasibility for runway repairs.

As of 2023, the site is set for redevelopment into a private "fly-in" community project, featuring residential units with aircraft hangars, a renovated runway, cottages, green spaces, and supporting amenities. Construction is planned to begin in 2025, aiming for the first residences to open in 2026. The airport remains private-use, restricted to small aircraft operations; larger jets are not expected. According to local observation, renovation and construction activities are ongoing.
