= Privateer Yacht Club =

- Burgee
- Founded: 1940
- Location: 4713 Privateer Rd, Hixson, Tennessee 37343
- Website: www.privateeryachtclub.org

The Privateer Yacht Club is a private yacht club located in Hixson, Tennessee, on the shore of Chickamauga Lake (United States).

The club is also the home site of the University of Tennessee at Chattanooga Sailing Team for intercollegiate sailing at the South Atlantic Intercollegiate Sailing Association.

Privateer Yacht Club has a facility that includes twenty eight acres, a clubhouse, one boat ramp and a dinghy hoist, wet slip docks for 80 sailboats, 110 dry slips for “dry sailed” boats and/or trailers, two maintenance hoists, a covered rack for a dozen kayaks, and a 1 1/2-mile wooded trail.

== History ==
Privateer Yacht Club was organized on July 25, 1940, after the Chickamauga Dam was built, by a group of Snipe sailors.

== Fleets ==
At the present time there are One-Design racing fleets of Catalina 22, MC Scow, Flying Scot and Snipe, besides CR-914 Radio-controlled and cruising fleets.
