= Wilkes T. Thrasher Bridge =

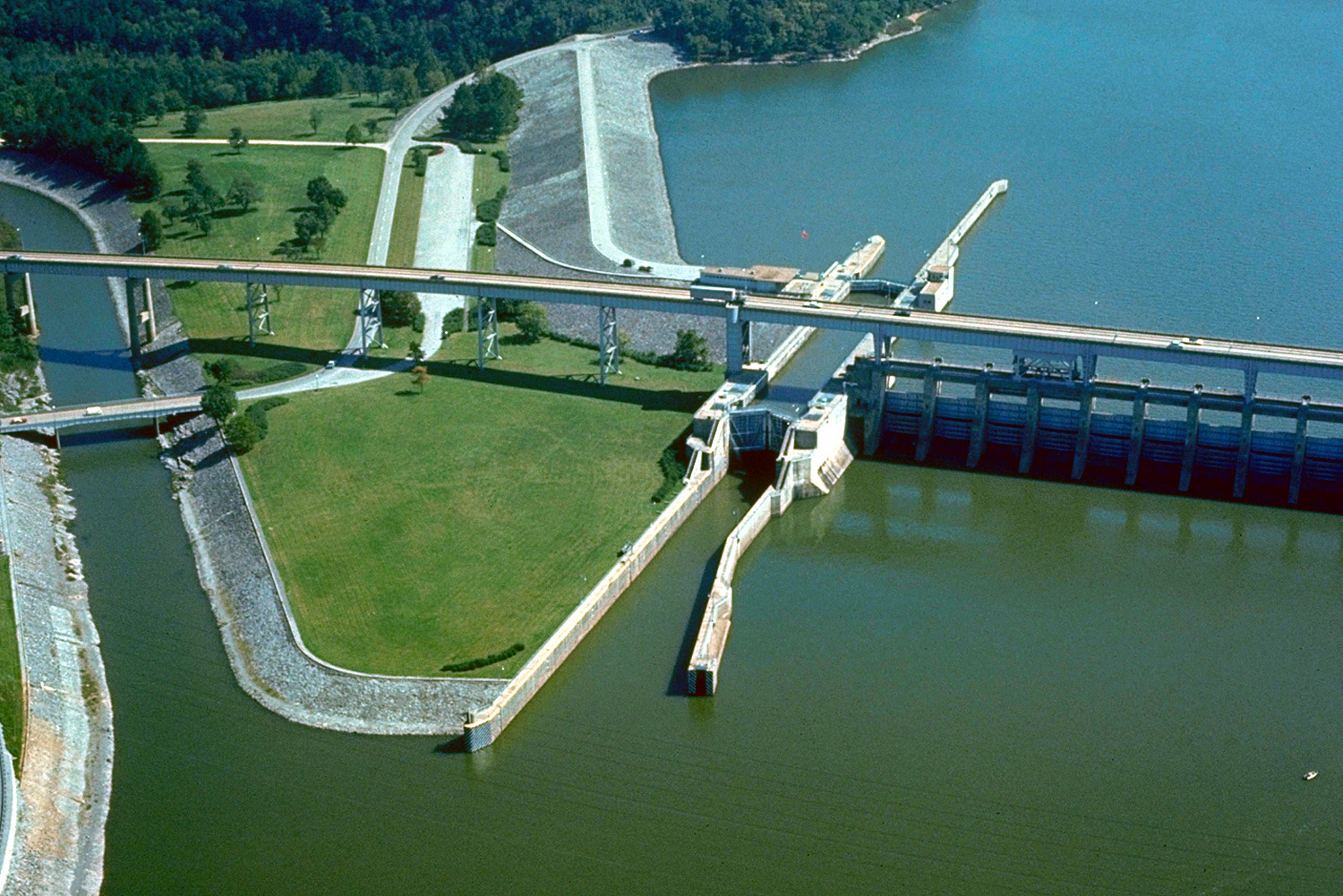
- The Wilkes T. Thrasher Bridge above the Chickamauga Dam and locks
- Coordinates: 35°06′16″N 85°13′45″W

Location
- Interactive map of Wilkes T. Thrasher Bridge

The Wilkes T. Thrasher Bridge is a 4-lane road bridge located in Chattanooga, Tennessee. It opened in 1955 as a two lane road after much pressure from Wilkes T. Thrasher, a prominent Hamilton County Judge, to the Federal Government. In the 1980s, the bridge was widened to four lanes. Traffic was rerouted via the neighboring C.B. Robinson Bridge carrying State Route 319 (Du Pont Pkwy) and carries Tennessee State Route 153 over the Chickamauga Dam crossing the Tennessee River.
