= Chickamauga Creek =

Stream in Tennessee, United States

Coordinates: 35.0892°N 85.2686°W

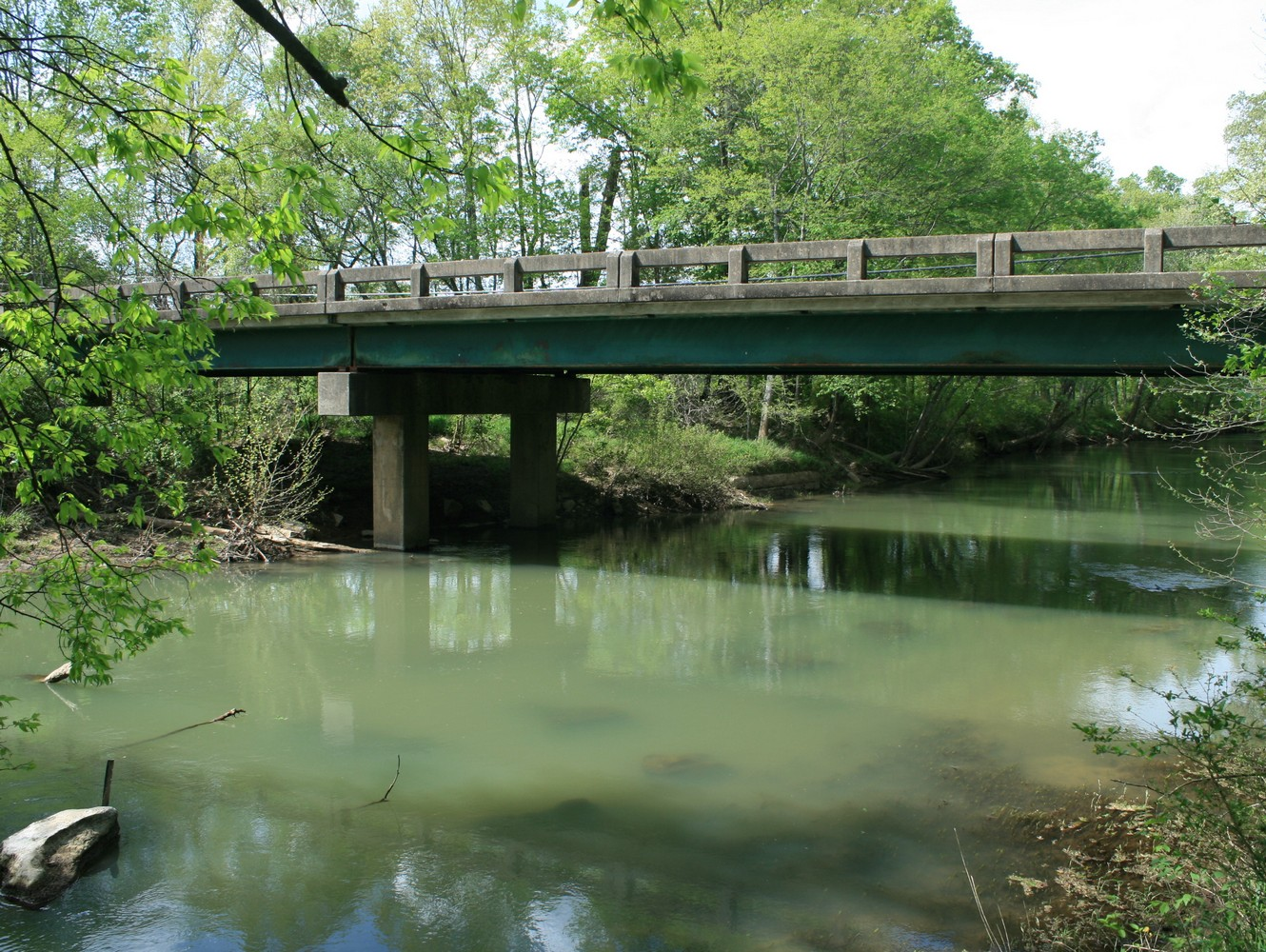
- Chickamauga Creek and Reeds Bridge

Location
- Country: United States
- State: Georgia (U.S. state), Tennessee

Physical characteristics
- Mouth: Tennessee River at Chattanooga, Tennessee, in Hamilton County, Tennessee

North and South Chickamauga Creek are short tributaries of the Tennessee River, which join it near Chattanooga, Tennessee, on the north and the south. West Chickamauga Creek is a much longer tributary of South Chickamauga Creek.

== Course ==
The two Chickamauga Creeks are part of the Georgia, Middle Tennessee-Chickamauga Watershed.

North Chickamauga Creek begins in an area called The Horseshoe, a portion of Walden Ridge, a branch of the Cumberland Plateau. The creek forms in southeastern Sequatchie County at the confluence of Standifer and Brimer creeks north of the community of Lone Oak, passes through the North Chickamauga Creek Gorge State Park, the city of Soddy-Daisy and the Hixson neighborhood of Chattanooga before joining the Tennessee River immediately below the Chickamauga Dam. North Chickamauga Creek runs entirely in Tennessee.

South Chickamauga Creek is a long and winding valley-floor stream that starts at the confluence of East Chickamauga Creek and Tiger Creek in Catoosa County, Georgia. It flows through the city of Ringgold, crossing the border into Tennessee at the city of East Ridge and from there into the city of Chattanooga. South Chickamauga Creek is prone to flooding. After a disastrous flood in 1973, a 2.6 miles long levee was constructed along the west bank of the creek between Shallowford Road and I-75 to protect the Brainerd neighborhood of Chattanooga. The Brainerd Levee is part of the longer South Chickamauga Creek Greenway, a multi-use trail and boardwalk that stretches from Camp Jordan Park in East Ridge to the Tennessee River.

A major tributary of South Chickamauga Creek is West Chickamauga Creek, which rises out of the confluence of Mud Creek and Mill Creek, and is joined by Brotherton Creek, just northeast of the Zahnd Wildlife Management Area between Rising Fawn and Lafayette in Walker County, Georgia. (Note: One EPA Watershed Report shows the West Chickamauga as rising out of the south end of Lookout Mountain, near Sandy Hollow. However, the same map labels that part of the creek as "Hog Jowl Creek", although the pop-up active link shows the Creek as "West Chickamauga Creek" According to the topozone.com topographical map, the length of West Chickamauga Creek is more than 37 miles (60 km) miles long from its start to "mile marker 0", where it joins South Chickamauga Creek, which is approximately 35 miles (56 km) long. However, the first map labels that part of the creek as "Hog Jowl Creek", although the pop-up active link shows the Creek as "West Chickamauga Creek" If that is the case, its length is closer to 50 miles (80 km). West Chickamauga Creek flows northeast through Walker and Catoosa counties in Northwest Georgia, and Hamilton County in East Tennessee. It forms the southeast border of the Chickamauga National Military Park in Chickamauga before flowing through Fort Oglethorpe, crossing the state line at East Ridge. West Chickamauga Creek joins South Chickamauga Creek near Brown Acres Golf Course and Camp Jordan Park, just north of the Tennessee/Georgia border. West Chickamauga Creek can be navigated by kayak or canoe from near Gordon and Lee Mill in the city of Chickamauga, northeast to where it joins with South Chickamauga Creek, and from there northward to the Tennessee River at Chattanooga. Its mean annual flow velocity (estimate) is 0.77 feet (0.23 m) per second.

== History ==
=== Chickamauga Indians ===
The tribal band of the Cherokee which settled near the creeks in the late 18th century became known as the Chickamauga. Under the leadership of Dragging Canoe, they became a frontier adversary to early American expansionism west of the Appalachian Mountains.

=== "Chickamauga" meaning ===
There is much discussion about the meaning of "Chickamauga". Although some experts say it translates to "River of Death", that name has no reference to the Battle of Chickamauga itself. It could also come from an ancient Chickasaw autonym- "Chickemacaw" as James Adair spelled it in his book The History of the American Indians.

=== Battle of Chickamauga ===
During the Civil War, one of the bloodiest engagements of the war was fought near West Chickamauga Creek over control of the railroad center at nearby Chattanooga. The conflict became known as the Battle of Chickamauga, fought September 18–20, 1863. However, the creek itself had very little influence on the course of the battle. The first skirmishes of the battle were fought when Confederate troops attempted to cross the West Chickamauga Creek, especially at Alexander's Bridge and Reed's Bridge, near the southeast and northeast borders of the present-day Chickamauga National Military Park

Union General William S. Rosecrans had established his army at Chickamauga, Georgia, 12 miles (19 km) southeast of Chattanooga. Confederate General Braxton Bragg had collected reinforcements and prepared to do battle, assisted by General James Longstreet. After three days of fighting, Rosecrans and a large portion of his army fled the field in disarray. The Battle of Chickamauga marked the end of the Union's "Chickamauga Campaign" in southeastern Tennessee and northwestern Georgia, and cost Rosencrans his command.

== See also ==
- List of rivers of Tennessee
