= Tennessee State Route 317 =

Highway in Tennessee

State Route 317

Route information
- Maintained by TDOT
- Length: 21.3 mi (34.3 km)
- Existed: July 1, 1983–present

Major junctions
- West end: SR 17 in Chattanooga
- SR 153 in Chattanooga; US 11 / US 64 in Tyner; I-75 / US 74 near Colledgedale
- East end: SR 60 near Red Clay State Park

Location
- Country: United States
- State: Tennessee
- Counties: Hamilton, Bradley

Highway system
- Tennessee State Routes; Interstate; US; State
← SR 316	→ SR 318

State Route 317 (SR 317) a state highway extending from Chattanooga, Tennessee, through Ooltewah, Collegedale, Apison, and ending in Bradley County. SR 317 is also known as Bonny Oaks Drive, Volkswagen Drive, Apison Pike, Wesleyan Road, and Weatherley Switch Road SE; it was formerly known as Old Lee Highway. It dead ends into SR 60 in Bradley County. In Chattanooga, this road crosses SR 58.

== History ==
The section between SR 17 and US 11/64 was originally numbered as SR 2A around 1934. This route was renumbered to SR 317 during the 1983 Tennessee state highway renumbering.

In between Chattanooga and Collegedale SR 317 formerly went along Old Lee Highway to Apison Pike. It has been since rerouted with the completion of the Volkswagen Drive exit on I-75. It now joins I-75 at exit 7 and runs concurrently with I-75 to exit 9, where SR 317 turns along Volkswagen Drive to Apison Pike.

The Tennessee Department of Transportation (TDOT) is working to widen and improve the 6.2-mile (10.0 km) Apison Pike section of SR 317, located between I-75 and SR 320 (East Brainerd Road) in four separate phases. Phase 1 consisted of constructing a new five-lane (including two-way left turn lane) road between I-75 and Old Lee Highway, part of the relocated section of SR 317. Phase 2, which took place between January 2015 and September 13, 2017, widened the segment between Old Lee Highway and SR 321 (Ooltewah-Ringgold Road) from two to five lanes at a cost of $24.2 million. Phase 3, which began on March 13, 2020, was the most complex and expensive phase. It was initially bid at a cost of $93.1 million, but ballooned to $98 million. It involved widening the route from two to five lanes between SR 321 and Layton Lane, including an entirely new alignment in some places. The new alignment opened on June 25, 2025, and a dedication ceremony for substantial completion of the project was held on July 15, 2025. Final work was completed over the next few months. Phase 4, the final phase, will widen SR 317 between Layton Lane and SR 320.

== Junction list ==
County	Location	mi	km	Destinations	Notes
Hamilton	Chattanooga	0.0	0.0	SR 17 (Bonny Oaks Drive) to SR 58 / SR 153 – Chattanooga, Harrison	Western terminus
Hamilton	Chattanooga			SR 153 – Soddy Daisy, Lakesite, Chattanooga	SR 153 exit 4
Hamilton	Tyner			US 11 south / US 64 west (Lee Highway/SR 2 west) – Chattanooga	Western end of US 11/US 64/SR 2 concurrency
Hamilton	Tyner			I-75 south / US 74 west – Chattanooga, Atlanta	Western end of I-75/US 74 concurrency; I-75/US 74 exit 7
Hamilton	Ooltewah			I-75 north / US 11 north / US 64 east / US 74 east (SR 2 east) – Cleveland, Knoxville	Eastern end of I-75/US 11/US 64/US 74/SR 2 concurrency; I-75/US 11/US 64/SR 2 exit 9
Hamilton	Collegedale			SR 321 (Ooltewah Ringgold Road) – Ringgold, Ooltewah	
Bradley				Red Clay Park Road Southwest – Red Clay State Park	
Bradley		21.3	34.3	SR 60 (Dalton Pike) – Cleveland, Dalton	Eastern terminus
1.000 mi = 1.609 km; 1.000 km = 0.621 mi: Concurrency terminus
