= Sky Park Airport (disambiguation) =

Sky Park Airport may refer to:

- Sky Park Airport in Red Hook, New York, United States (FAA: 46N)
- Dallas Bay Sky Park in Chattanooga, Tennessee, United States (FAA: 1A0)
- Sierra Sky Park Airport in Fresno, California, United States (FAA: E79)
