= Tyner, Chattanooga =

Tyner
- Neighborhood
- Interactive map of Tyner
- Coordinates: 35°03′46″N 085°09′26″W
- Country: United States
- State: Tennessee
- County: Hamilton
- City: Chattanooga

Tyner (historically, Tynerville or Tyners Station) is a neighborhood in Hamilton County, Tennessee, United States. Formerly a separate community, Tyner is located within Chattanooga's present city limits, and is today considered a neighborhood of Chattanooga.

== Education ==
- Tyner Academy
- Tyner Middle Academy

== Industry ==
Enterprise South Industrial Park is located in Tyner.
