= Enterprise South Industrial Park =

Industrial complex in Chattanooga, Tennessee, United States

Coordinates: 35.09°N 85.14°W

The Enterprise South Industrial Park, located in Chattanooga, Tennessee consists of 6,000 acres (24 km^{2}). Originally the site of the Volunteer Army Ammunition Plant and operated by the U.S. Department of Defense, a large portion of the property is now home to the Volkswagen Chattanooga Assembly Plant as well as other industries.

== History ==
The Volunteer Army Ammunition Plant (VAAP) operated as a TNT (trinitrotoluene) manufacturing facility from 1942 to 1977 and supported a fertilizer production facility from 1962 to 1982.

=== 1942-1952 ===
The United States Army Corps of Engineers built the original facilities to supply ammunition for Allied Forces during World War II. Initial operation began in July 1942 with the Hercules Powder Company of Wilmington Delaware as the operating contractor. Sixteen TNT batch process lines and associated nitric and sulfuric acid facilities operated until August 1945. Approximately 823 million pounds of TNT were produced for WWII at VAAP (IT Corp 1994).

From January 1946 to the spring of 1952, VAAP was officially on standby status and operated and maintained by the government (USATHAMA 1978; Army 2003).

=== 1952-1957 ===
VAAP was reactivated in 1952 for the Korean War, and operated by the Atlas Chemical Industries of Wilmington Delaware until 1957. Approximately 283 million lbs of TNT were produced for the Korean War (IT Corp 1994). During this period the first Army studies were undertaken to examine methods of pollution control but VAAP was put on standby status before pollution strategies could be implemented (IT Corp 1994).

=== 1957-1965 ===
VAAP was on standby status from 1957 until 1965 when it was reactivated for the Vietnam War (Army 2003a; IT Corp 1994). Between the Korean and Vietnam Wars there was considerable residential development north of VAAP and adjacent to the Chickamauga Lake (IT Corp 1994). From March 1957 to December 1964 the plant was under the protective surveillance of Atlas Chemical Industries; and in December 1964 until September 1965 protective surveillance was passed onto Farmers Chemical Association Inc. (subsequently known as CF Industries, Incorporated [CFI]). In September 1965 a new contract with Atlas was entered into with the Army (SI 1994). On January 6, 1972, Atlas merged into ICI America Incorporated (ICIA), and is currently called ICI Americas, Inc. (Army 2003a; USATHAMA 1978).

In 1961, the government leased the "CFI Lease Area," an area along the western border of VAAP, to CFI (Bonds 1985). Previously the area had been used for nitric and sulfuric acid production (Army 2003a). In 1962, CFI used the existing acid facilities and built an ammonia plant on the 824-acre lease area to produce ammonium nitrate fertilizer, urea, and related products (Army 2003a). In 1963 a urea plant was put into operation, thereby doubling CFI's production capacity (IT Corp 1994).

=== 1965-1977 ===
In 1965, VAAP was reactivated and ten TNT batch process lines were used to produce TNT for the Vietnam War (IT Corp 1994).

Additionally, upon reactivation, the Army decreased the number of acres in the original CFI lease area and took over the operation of some of the acid production equipment to increase nitric acid production and sulfuric acid concentration capacity. Therefore, in 1966, CFI constructed a new acid plant adjacent to the ammonia plant, and operated the existing acid plant in the lease area for the Army (Bonds 1985; Army 2003a).

In February 1969, as VAAP began to upgrade facilities, the batch processing lines began to decrease (Report 123, 1978; Army 2003a). From July 1971 to 1975, six new CIL continuous process lines were built in an area where four old batch process lines were previously razed (Army 2003a). Lines 1, 2, and 3 were modernized by May 1974, and a contract for modernizing Lines 4, 5, and 6 was awarded in June 1974. However, from November 1974 to March 1977, only one of the six Canadian Industries Limited (CIL) lines was operated because plant operations ceased before the other five became operational (IT Corp 1994; USATHAMA 1978).

In June 1970, the Army began to build the New Acid Area. The area included a Direct Strong Nitric (DSN) Acid Facility, an Ammonia Oxidation Process (AOP) Nitric Acid Facility, and Sulfuric Acid Regeneration (SAR) Facilities (used for oleum production) (IT Corp 1994; USATHAMA 1978). In 1972, a carbon dioxide plant was constructed at the CFI Lease Area and an industrial waste water system was built to treat and recycle ammonium nitrate wastewater (IT Corp 1994; USATHAMA 1978).

By January 1975, all batch process lines stopped and, in 1977, TNT production at VAAP ceased altogether and the plant was placed on inactive status (Army 2003a). A total of 1,765 million lbs of TNT were produced for the Vietnam War (IT Corp 1994).

=== 1980s ===
CFI produced commercial ammonium nitrate at the CFI Lease Area until 1982. From 1982 to 1985 the CFI Lease Area was inactive, and the CFI facilities were ultimately dismantled for salvage between 1985 and 1986 (IT Corp 1994). The Army acid facilities in the southern area were dismantled during the 1950s and 1960s. The northern acid facilities were dismantled by approximately 1997 (Army 2003a, IT Corp 1995, Public Comment 2004b).

=== 1990s ===
During the 1990s, VAAP operated the burning ground to treat materials contaminated with TNT or TNT waste materials generated while VAAP was operational (EPA 2003a; IT Corp 1994, Public Comment 2004b)

On September 5, 1995, approximately $5 million was awarded to ICIA to reactivate and modify one of the TNT lines at VAAP for production of commercial TNT. The contract was awarded under the Armament Retooling and Manufacturing Support Act of 1992, and the work was to be complete by July 31, 1996 (DOD 1995). This work was never completed and the ICIA contract expired on December 31, 1998. Tecumseh Professional Associates became the new contracting operator, however, the project remained and remains inactive.

== Redevelopment and conversion to civilian uses ==
In the 1990s, portions of the site began to be opened up to civilian purposes. Hickory Valley Road was constructed through the facility, connecting SR 58 with SR 317. The Hamilton County Schools executed a lease on the old administration buildings at VAAP, renovating the facilities for their central office.

Additional efforts to restore the site for industrial used were made. In 2006 the Tennessee Department of Transportation (TDOT) constructed an interchange on nearby Interstate 75 and a connector road into the park. In July 2008, Volkswagen announced plans to locate an assembly plant in the park. The plant began operations in April 2011.

An additional 2,800 acres (11 km^{2}) of land on the east side of the park was opened to the public as the Enterprise South Nature Park. The park opened to the public in December 2010. The park is for passive uses, including bicycling and walking. The land where the nature park is located was originally used for storing explosives manufactured at the VAAP, and most of the storage bunkers still remain.

On October 14, 2010, it was announced that CSX and Norfolk Southern Railway would again serve the site following the completion of a $6.6 million project to provide dual rail service to the Volkswagen Chattanooga Assembly Plant. The newly completed yard was dedicated on April 6, 2011. Work included "the biggest rail overhaul in and around the Volunteer Army Ammunition Plant since the tracks were laid during World War II." Direct switching activities for the site is handled by the Tennessee Valley Railroad Museum's wholly owned subsidiary Tyner Terminal Railway Company, which transfers railcars to NS and CSX trains.
