= Hixson, Chattanooga =

Hixson
- Neighborhood
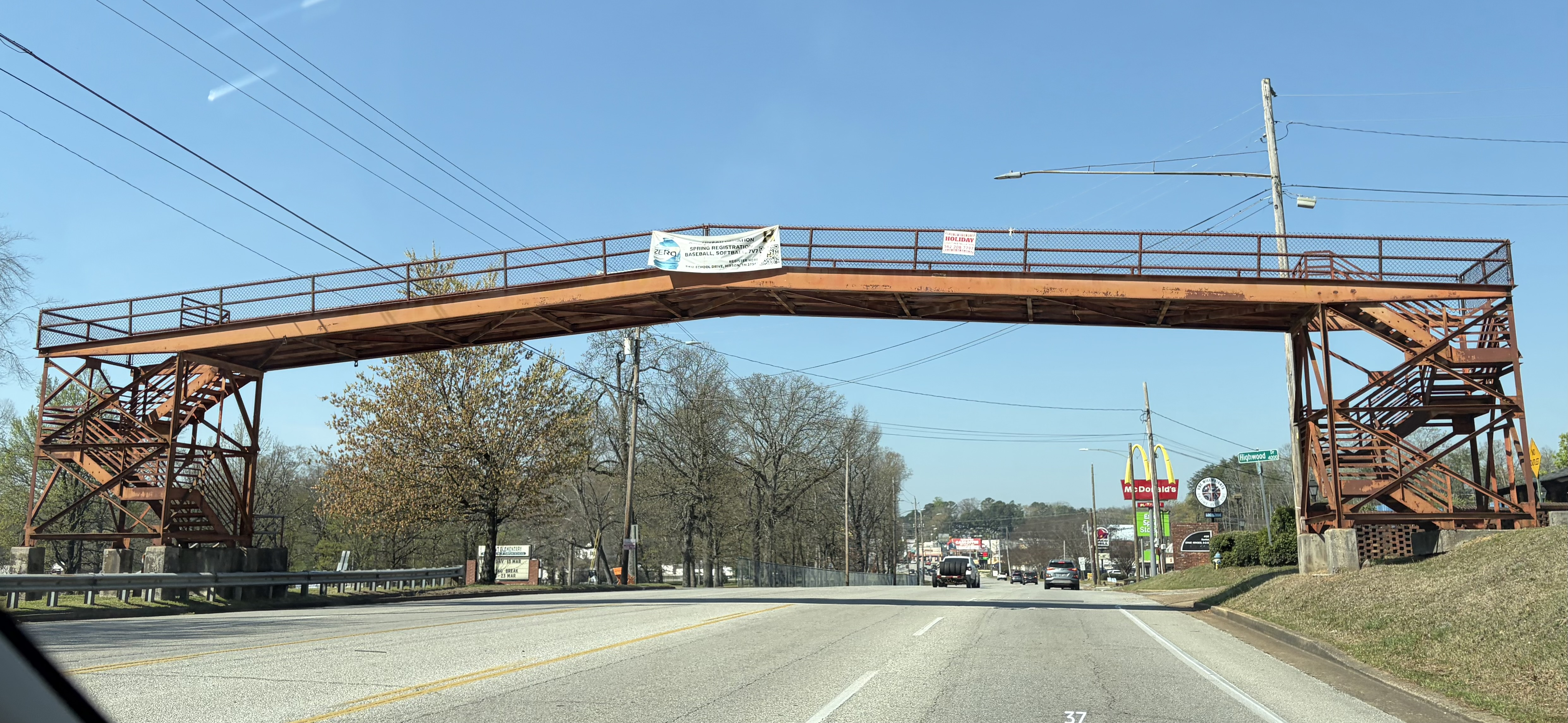
- A pedestrian bridge crosses Hixson Pike

- Location within Tennessee Location within the United States
- Coordinates: 35°02′55″N 85°20′00″W
- Country: United States
- State: Tennessee
- County: Hamilton
- City: Chattanooga
- Elevation: 686 ft (209 m)

Population (2020)
  - Total: 14,216
- Time zone: UTC-5 (Eastern (EST))
  - Summer (DST): UTC-4 (EDT)
- ZIP codes: 37343
- Area code: 423
- FIPS code: 47065
- GNIS feature ID: 1306579

Hixson is a former unincorporated community and now part of the city of Chattanooga in Hamilton County, Tennessee, United States. Its population was 14,216 in 2020. It is in the northeastern part of Chattanooga and is part of the Chattanooga, TN-GA Metropolitan Statistical Area.

Hixson is typically defined as the area north of Rivermont (a Chattanooga neighborhood), east of the city of Red Bank and U.S. Highway 27, and south of unincorporated Middle Valley and Thrasher Pike. It is bordered to the east by the Tennessee River. Neighborhoods within Hixson include DuPont, Northgate, Big Ridge, and Valleybrook.

== History ==
The land around Hixson was first settled by Europeans around 1821 by pioneers John and Elendar Hixson. While Elendar was born in Bledsoe County, Tennessee, John Hixson, born in 1797, came from Virginia. This family of Hixsons first came to America in the mid-1600's when John Hixson's great great grandfather, William Hixson II from Frodsham, sailed to New Jersey. John and Elendar had 9 children between 1821 and 1851. Greatly opposed to any involvement in a civil war, some of the family began traveling further westward in 1852 to southern Missouri with the incorrect hopes that state would remain a neutral location in the looming national conflict.

== Government ==
Hixson is represented on the Chattanooga City Council with two district seats – District 2 currently held by Jenny Kellog-Hill and District 3 currently held by Ken Smith. Hixson is represented on the Hamilton County Commission in two districts as well: District 1, currently held by Gen O Shipley; and District 3, held by Ken Smith(2022).

== Retail ==
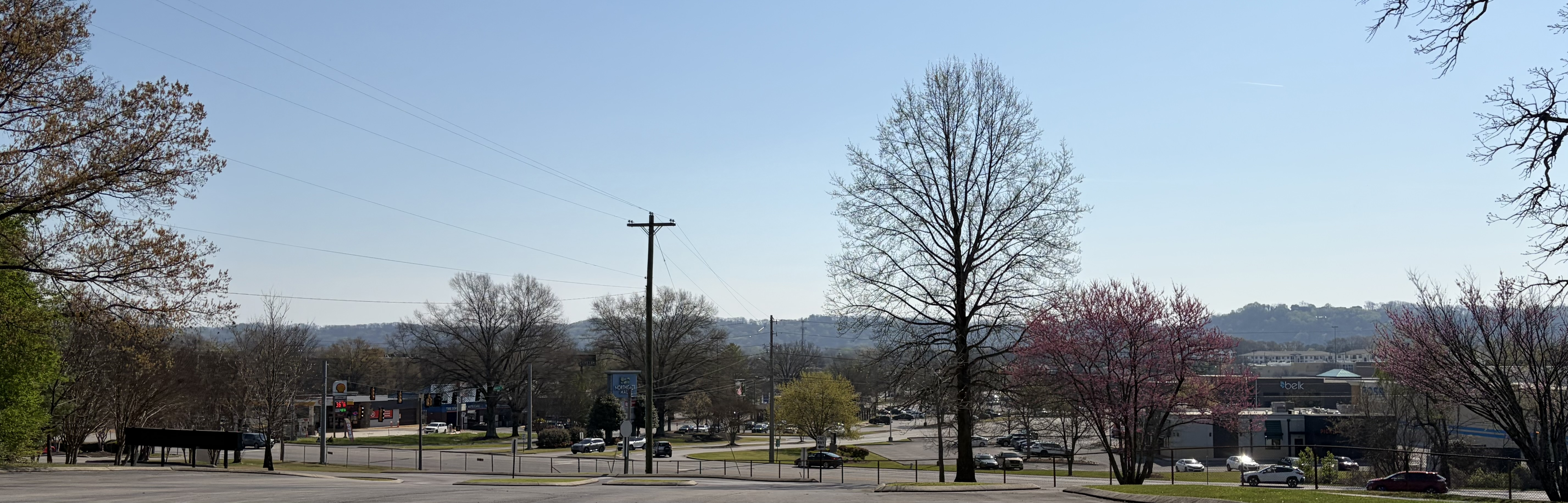
The Northgate Mall on Hixson Pike

Hixson has a retail center based around Northgate Mall. Originally built in 1972, it is one of two major mall shopping venues for Chattanooga (the other is the larger Hamilton Place). CBL in 2012 purchased Northgate Mall for $11.5 million and has announced a major renovation for the mall.

== Schools ==
The school system is run by the Hamilton County government, as the county and city school systems were merged in 1997, after a 1995 voting referendum. Hixson has one public high school – the Hixson High School. Hixson also has one predominant middle school – the Hixson Middle School – although Loftis Middle School serves a small portion of the community on the north side of Big Ridge. Currently there are five elementary schools in the public system that serve the area: Big Ridge Elementary, McConnell Elementary, Ganns Middle Valley Elementary, DuPont Elementary, and Hixson Elementary. However, this is likely to change in the near future as the Hamilton County Board of Education has selected two of these schools for reassignment. Current plans call for DuPont Elementary to be closed and merged with Alpine Crest and Rivermont Elementary. Ganns Middle Valley Elementary will have a larger school built on a site which is yet to be determined.

== Attractions ==
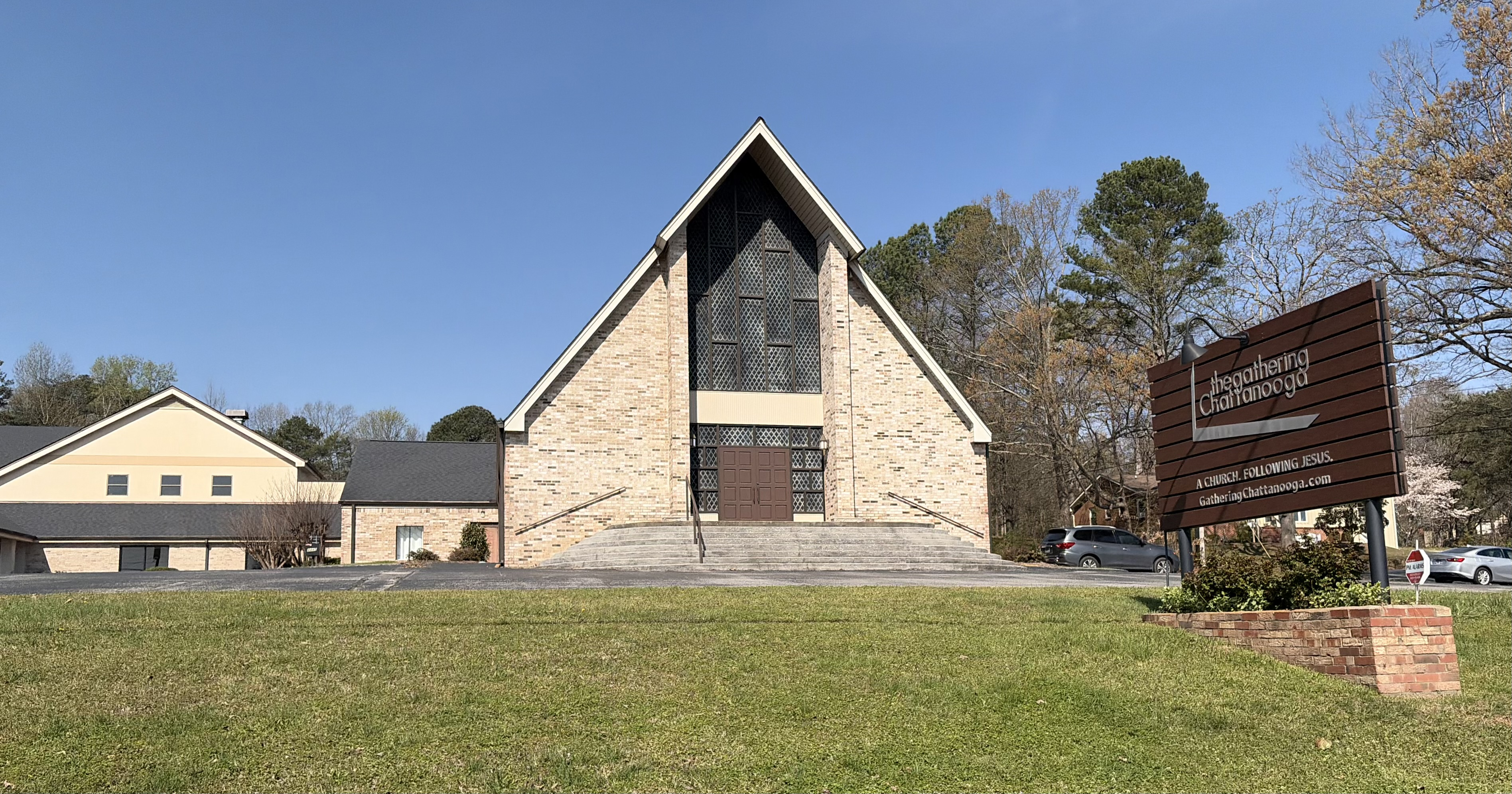
The Gathering Chattanooga, a Baptist church in the Hixson area

Hixson has several area attractions. The Chickamauga Dam is part of its eastern border along with several marinas along the Tennessee River. Greenway Farms is part of the North Chickamauga Creek Conservancy and offers hiking, canoeing, sports, and a dog park. Valleybrook Golf Course hosts the Choo Choo Classic and was a regular PGA stop from 1983 to 1991 with the Chattanooga Classic.
