= Soddy-Daisy, Tennessee =

- City
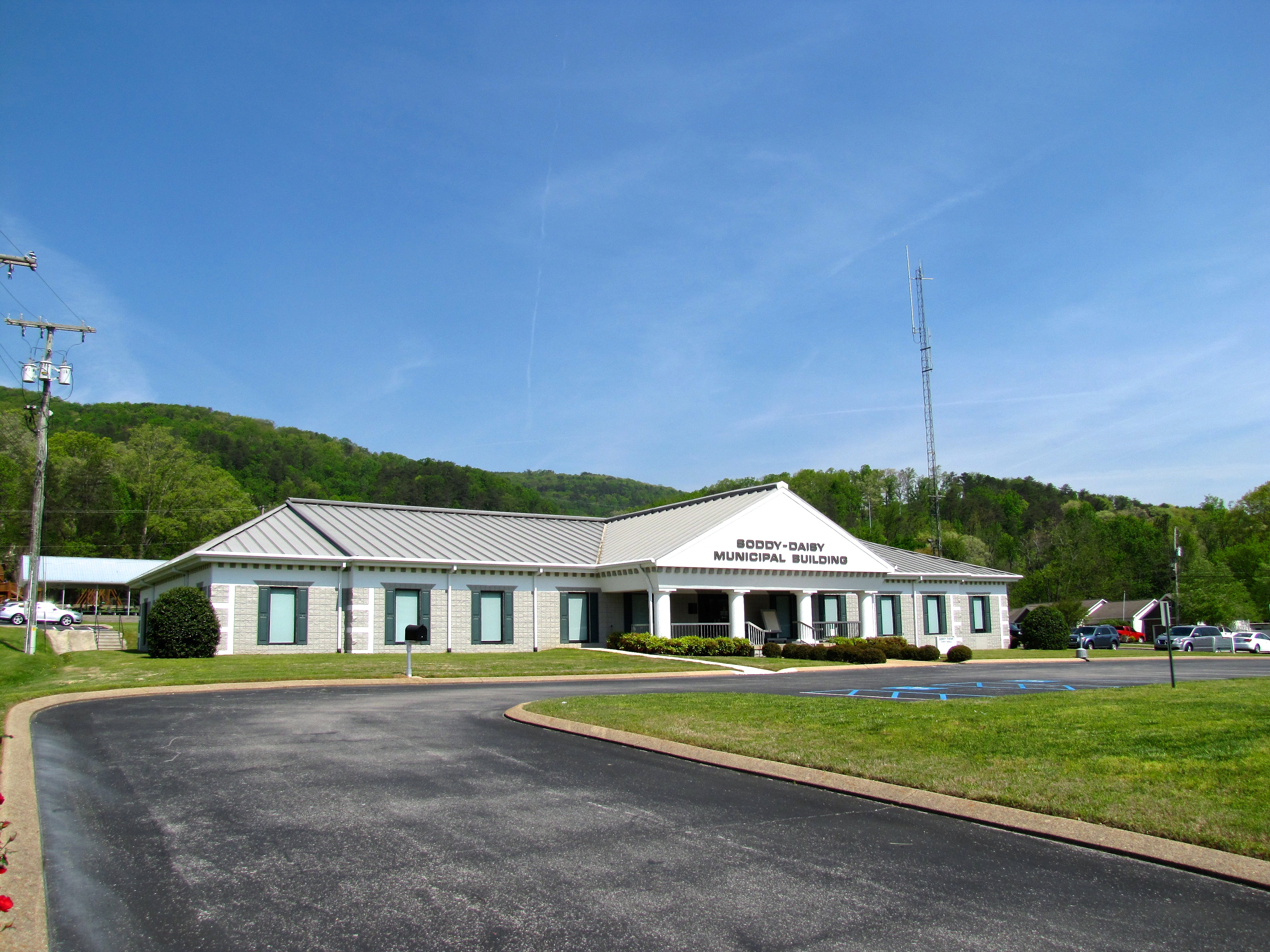
- Soddy-Daisy City Hall

- Location of Soddy-Daisy in Hamilton County, Tennessee
- Coordinates: 35°15′31″N 85°10′37″W
- Country: United States
- State: Tennessee
- County: Hamilton
- Incorporated: 1969

Area
  - Total: 24.04 sq mi (62.26 km^{2})
  - Land: 23.17 sq mi (60.02 km^{2})
  - Water: 0.86 sq mi (2.24 km^{2})
- Elevation: 699 ft (213 m)

Population (2020)
  - Total: 13,070
  - Density: 564.0/sq mi (217.75/km^{2})
- Time zone: UTC-5 (Eastern (EST))
  - Summer (DST): UTC-4 (EDT)
- ZIP codes: 37379, 37384
- Area code: 423
- FIPS code: 47-69560
- GNIS feature ID: 1270798
- Website: www.soddy-daisy.org

Soddy-Daisy is a city in Hamilton County, Tennessee, United States. The population was 13,070 at the 2020 census and estimated to be 13,619 in 2022. The city was formed in 1969 when the communities of Soddy (to the north) and Daisy (to the south), along with nearby developed areas along U.S. Route 27, merged to form Soddy-Daisy. It is becoming a bedroom community of nearby Chattanooga and is part of the Chattanooga Metropolitan Statistical Area. Sequoyah Nuclear Generating Station is located in Soddy-Daisy.

== History ==
Soddy-Daisy is an incorporated city, comprising the former Tennessee cities of Soddy and Daisy. It has frequently been noted on lists of unusual place names.

Soddy-Daisy was home to Hamilton County's first courthouse and government seat, Poe's Tavern. The tavern, built in 1819, was the home of Soddy-Daisy resident Hasten Poe. In 1838, the tavern served as a way station for 1,900 Cherokees who were on the Trail of Tears. During the Civil War, Poe's Tavern served as a hospital for both Union and Confederate troops. Though the original Poe's Tavern was torn down in 1911, the city of Soddy-Daisy has reconstructed a replica of the building a block away from the original site.

There are two popular stories about how the city of Soddy got its name. The first is that the word "Soddy" is an anglicization of Tsati, a shorter form of the Cherokee word ᎠᏂ ᎫᏌᏘ Ᏹ (Ani-Kusati-yi), referring to the Muskogean Koasati people who lived there in the 18th century prior to Cherokee migration to the area after 1776. The second theory is that Soddy was named for William Sodder, who ran a trading post in the city. Others claim that Soddy's name is a reference to Soddy Creek, which is believed to have originated from the Cherokee word Sauta, which is derived from Echota. Soddy was a very small town until the Soddy Coal Company began mining in 1867.

Daisy is rumored to have taken its name from Daisy Parks, the daughter of Thomas Parks. Thomas Parks was vice-president of the Tabler-Cleudup Coal & Coke Company, and founded the Daisy Coal Company in April 1881.

The two cities incorporated in April 1969 along a 9-mile (14 km) stretch of U.S. 27.

== Geography ==
Soddy-Daisy is located in north-central Hamilton County at 35°15′31″N 85°10′37″W (35.258538, -85.176996). Its southwestern end is bordered by the city of Chattanooga. Unincorporated communities that border Soddy-Daisy are Middle Valley to the south, Falling Water to the southwest, Mowbray Mountain to the west and Flat Top Mountain to the northwest. According to the United States Census Bureau, the city has a total area of 23.4 square miles (60.7 km^{2}), of which 22.6 square miles (58.6 km^{2}) are land and 0.81 square miles (2.1 km^{2}), or 3.51%, are water.

The city is situated at the base of the Cumberland Escarpment, the east face of Walden Ridge, which is part of the Cumberland Plateau. An inlet of Chickamauga Lake (consisting of the lower part of Soddy Creek) lies to the east. U.S. Route 27 is the city's main highway, connecting it with Chattanooga 16 miles (26 km) to the south and Dayton 22 miles (35 km) to the northeast. State Route 111, which crosses Walden Ridge and leads 17 miles (27 km) northwest to Dunlap, intersects US-27 in the northern part of the city.

The area is home to the popular Stone Fort bouldering area.

== Demographics ==
Historical population
Census	Pop.	Note	%±
1970	7,569		—
1980	8,388		10.8%
1990	8,240		−1.8%
2000	11,530		39.9%
2010	12,714		10.3%
2020	13,070		2.8%
2025 (est.)	13,474	▲	3.1%

=== Racial and ethnic composition ===
Soddy-Daisy city, Tennessee – Racial and ethnic composition Note: the US Census treats Hispanic/Latino as an ethnic category. This table excludes Latinos from the racial categories and assigns them to a separate category. Hispanics/Latinos may be of any race.
Race / Ethnicity (NH = Non-Hispanic)	Pop 2000	Pop 2010	Pop 2020	% 2000	% 2010	% 2020
White alone (NH)	11,245	12,206	11,867	97.53%	96.00%	90.80%
Black or African American alone (NH)	68	83	137	0.59%	0.65%	1.05%
Native American or Alaska Native alone (NH)	26	42	27	0.23%	0.33%	0.21%
Asian alone (NH)	22	41	44	0.19%	0.32%	0.34%
Native Hawaiian or Pacific Islander alone (NH)	1	1	3	0.01%	0.01%	0.02%
Other race alone (NH)	6	8	21	0.05%	0.06%	0.16%
Mixed race or Multiracial (NH)	70	128	575	0.61%	1.01%	4.40%
Hispanic or Latino (any race)	92	205	396	0.80%	1.61%	3.03%
Total	11,530	12,714	13,070	100.00%	100.00%	100.00%

=== 2020 census ===
As of the 2020 census, Soddy-Daisy had a population of 13,070, with 5,304 households and 3,378 families residing in the city.

The median age was 44.4 years. 20.1% of residents were under the age of 18 and 20.9% of residents were 65 years of age or older. For every 100 females there were 90.8 males, and for every 100 females age 18 and over there were 89.3 males age 18 and over.

79.1% of residents lived in urban areas, while 20.9% lived in rural areas.

Of the 5,304 households in Soddy-Daisy, 27.8% had children under the age of 18 living in them. Of all households, 50.8% were married-couple households, 16.3% were households with a male householder and no spouse or partner present, and 26.1% were households with a female householder and no spouse or partner present. About 25.6% of all households were made up of individuals and 11.9% had someone living alone who was 65 years of age or older.

There were 5,665 housing units, of which 6.4% were vacant. The homeowner vacancy rate was 1.4% and the rental vacancy rate was 4.4%.

Racial composition as of the 2020 census
Race	Number	Percent
White	11,973	91.6%
Black or African American	140	1.1%
American Indian and Alaska Native	38	0.3%
Asian	46	0.4%
Native Hawaiian and Other Pacific Islander	3	0.0%
Some other race	144	1.1%
Two or more races	726	5.6%

=== 2000 census ===
As of the census of 2000, there was a population of 11,530, with 4,511 households and 3,392 families residing in the city. The population density was 500.6 inhabitants per square mile (193.3/km^{2}). There were 4,809 housing units at an average density of 208.8 per square mile (80.6/km^{2}). The racial makeup of the city was 98.15% White, 0.60% African American, 0.24% American Indian, 0.19% Asian, 0.01% Pacific Islander, 0.17% from other races, and 0.63% from two or more races. Hispanic or Latino of any race were 0.80% of the population.

There were 4,511 households, out of which 31.6% had children under the age of 18 living with them, 59.9% were married couples living together, 11.4% had a female householder with no husband present, and 24.8% were non-families. 21.8% of all households were made up of individuals, and 8.8% had someone living alone who was 65 years of age or older. The average household size was 2.53 and the average family size was 2.93.

In the city, the population was spread out, with 23.0% under the age of 18, 8.7% from 18 to 24, 29.3% from 25 to 44, 25.5% from 45 to 64, and 13.5% who were 65 years of age or older. The median age was 38 years. For every 100 females, there were 93.3 males. For every 100 females age 18 and over, there were 90.3 males.

The median income for a household in the city was $37,163, and the median income for a family was $41,394. Males had a median income of $32,073 versus $23,147 for females. The per capita income for the city was $16,889. About 6.5% of families and 8.8% of the population were below the poverty line, including 10.6% of those under age 18 and 13.4% of those age 65 or over.

== Government ==
Soddy-Daisy's City Commission currently consists of Jim Coleman, City Mayor; Mark Penney, Vice Mayor; other city commissioners are Travis Beene, Steve Everett, and Marcus Keith.

The City Manager is currently Burt Johnson, who is also the Finance Director and Recorder.

== Education ==
=== Schools ===
Soddy-Daisy has seven schools:

- Allen Elementary
- Daisy Elementary
- Soddy Elementary
- Ivy Academy
- Soddy-Daisy Middle
- Soddy-Daisy High School
- Sequoyah High School

=== Library ===
Soddy-Daisy has a privately operated community library, which opened in 2018 with the support from local residents, businesses and organizations following years without a public library within the Soddy-Daisy city limits or in the Sale Creek area.

=== Museum ===
Soddy-Daisy has one museum, which was opened in 2017 and remains operated by the city's historical association. The museum, currently housed in the 100 year old former bank building in Soddy has exhibits that showcase and teach the history of Soddy-Daisy area. The historical association also hosts an annual history fair at Soddy-Daisy High School every January.

== Media ==
- Soddy-Daisy has one local radio station licensed to its community, WGOW-FM.

== Notable people ==
- Joe Chaney, darts player
- Ron Cox, racing driver
- Terry Gordy, professional wrestler
- Bryan Harvey, former Major League Baseball relief pitcher
- Ralph McGill, journalist

== In popular culture ==
In the "I'm a Guest Here" episode of the ABC TV series Will Trent (season 3, episode 1, first broadcast on January 7, 2025), Georgia Bureau of Investigation agent Will Trent has escaped from his personal and professional problems to Soddy-Daisy before he is convinced to return to help solve a crime in Atlanta.
