= Chickamauga Dam =

Hydroelectric dam in Hamilton County, Tennessee, United States

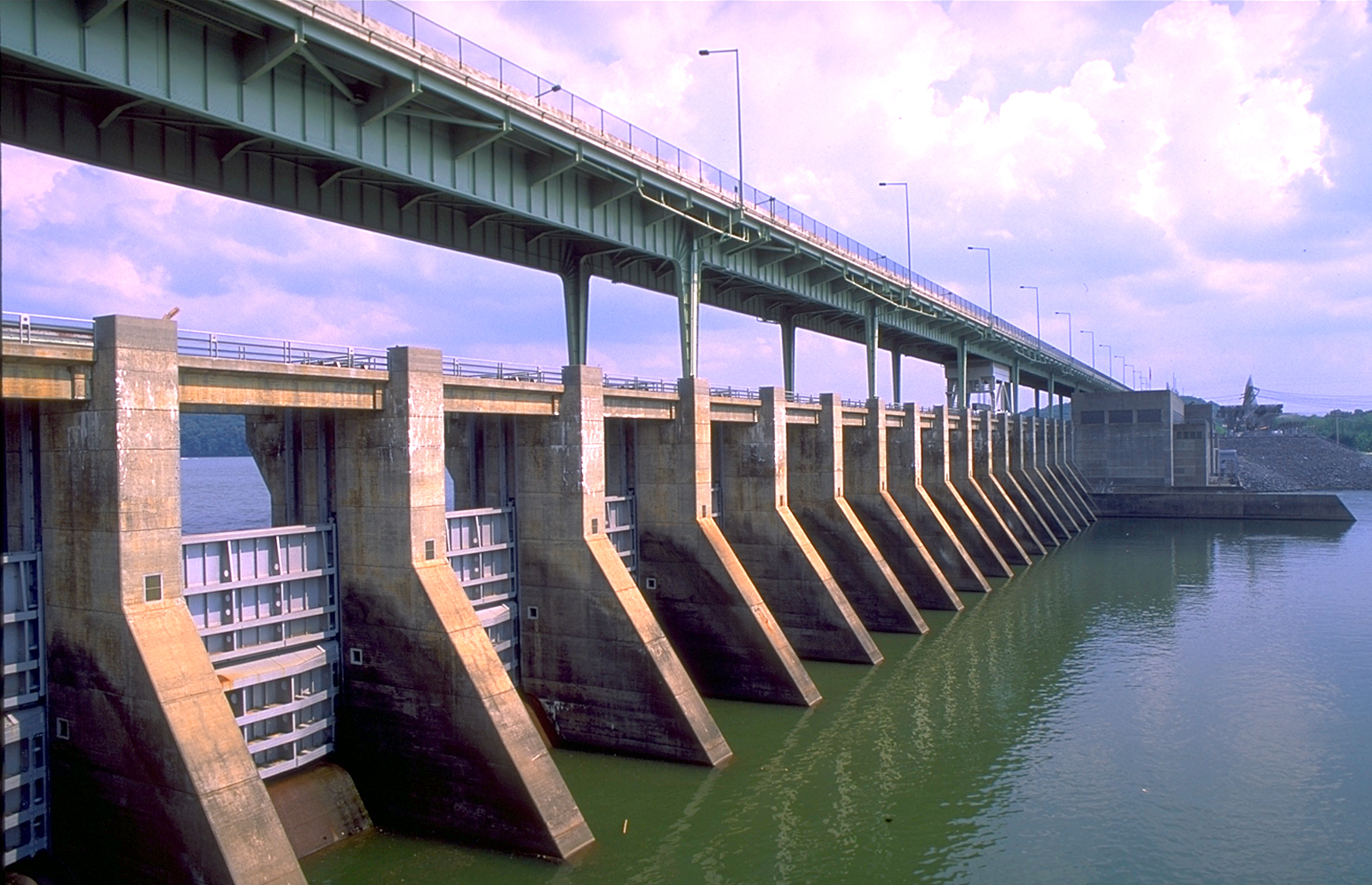
- Chickamauga Dam
- Interactive map of Chickamauga Dam
- Official name: Chickamauga Dam
- Location: Chattanooga, Tennessee, U.S.
- Coordinates: 35°06′14″N 85°13′46″W
- Construction began: January 13, 1936
- Opening date: January 15, 1940
- Operator: Tennessee Valley Authority

Dam and spillways
- Impounds: Tennessee River
- Height: 129 ft (39 m)
- Length: 5,800 ft (1,800 m)

Reservoir
- Creates: Chickamauga Lake
- Total capacity: 737,300 acre⋅ft (909,400 dam^{3})
- Catchment area: 20,790 mi^{2} (53,800 km^{2})

The Chickamauga Dam is a hydroelectric dam on the Tennessee River in Chattanooga, Tennessee, United States. The dam is owned and operated by the Tennessee Valley Authority, which built the dam in the late 1930s as part of a New Deal era initiative to improve navigation and bring flood control and economic development to the Tennessee Valley. The dam impounds the 36,240-acre (14,670 ha) Chickamauga Lake and feeds into Nickajack Lake. The dam and associated infrastructure were listed on the National Register of Historic Places in 2017.

Chickamauga Dam is named for the Chickamaugas, a politically detached branch of the Cherokee whose chief village was located just north of the dam site during the 18th century. The tribe's name has also been applied to several streams in the Chattanooga area, as well as an important American Civil War battle and a sandbar that existed at the dam site prior to its construction.

== Location ==
Chickamauga Dam is located 471 miles (758 km) upstream from the mouth of the Tennessee River, just east of downtown Chattanooga at the river's confluence with North Chickamauga Creek. The reservoir stretches for 59 miles (95 km) from Chickamauga Dam to the base of Watts Bar Dam, and includes parts of Hamilton, Bradley, McMinn, Rhea, and Meigs counties. The reservoir's notable embayments include Harrison Bay at its confluence with Wolftever Creek approximately 10 miles (16 km) upstream from the dam and the Soddy Creek embayment at 20 miles (32 km) upstream. Along with its main Tennessee River channel, the reservoir is navigable across the lower 18 miles (29 km) of the Hiwassee River, which joins the Tennessee River 30 miles (48 km) above the dam.

The Wilkes T. Thrasher Bridge carries Tennessee State Route 153 across the top of Chickamauga Dam. The road connects the dam to Interstate 75 to the south and U.S. Route 27 to the north. The Tennessee Riverwalk, a 10-mile (16 km) walkway along the Tennessee River, begins at the dam.

There is also a water tower notably close to the site.

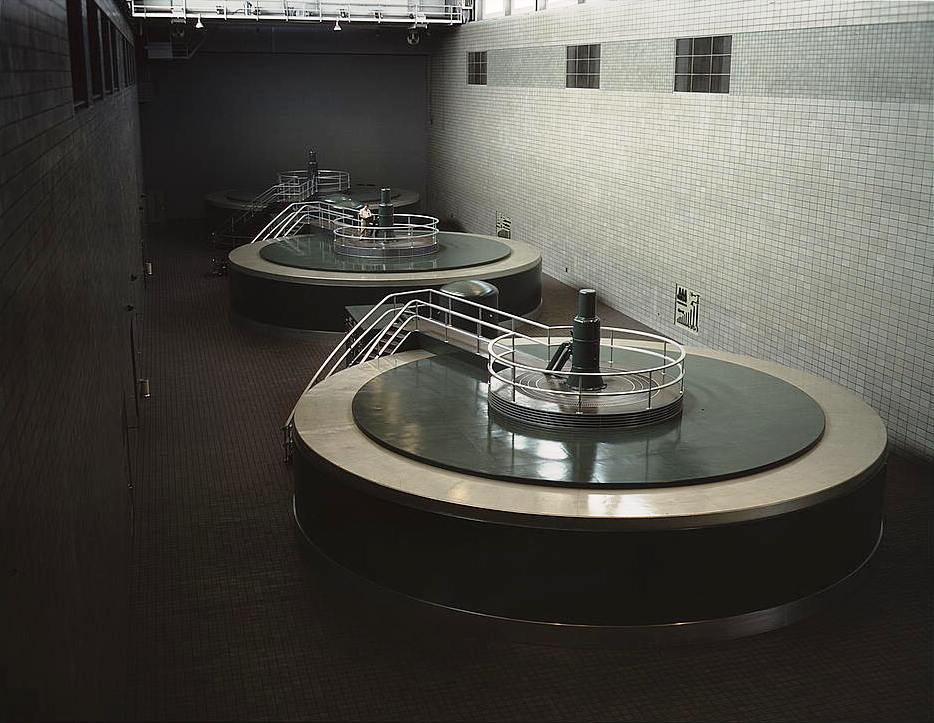
Generator hall of the powerhouse

== Capacity ==
Chickamauga Dam is a concrete gravity-type dam 5,800 feet (1,800 m) long and 129 feet (39 m) high. Its hydroelectric generating capacity is 119 megawatts. The dam has 18 spillway bays with a combined discharge of 470,000 cubic feet per second (13,000 m^{3}/s).

A 60-by-360-foot (18 by 110 m) navigation lock allows barges and other boats to travel past the dam, raising or lowering vessels 53 feet (16 m) between Chickamauga and Nickajack reservoirs.

== Background and construction ==
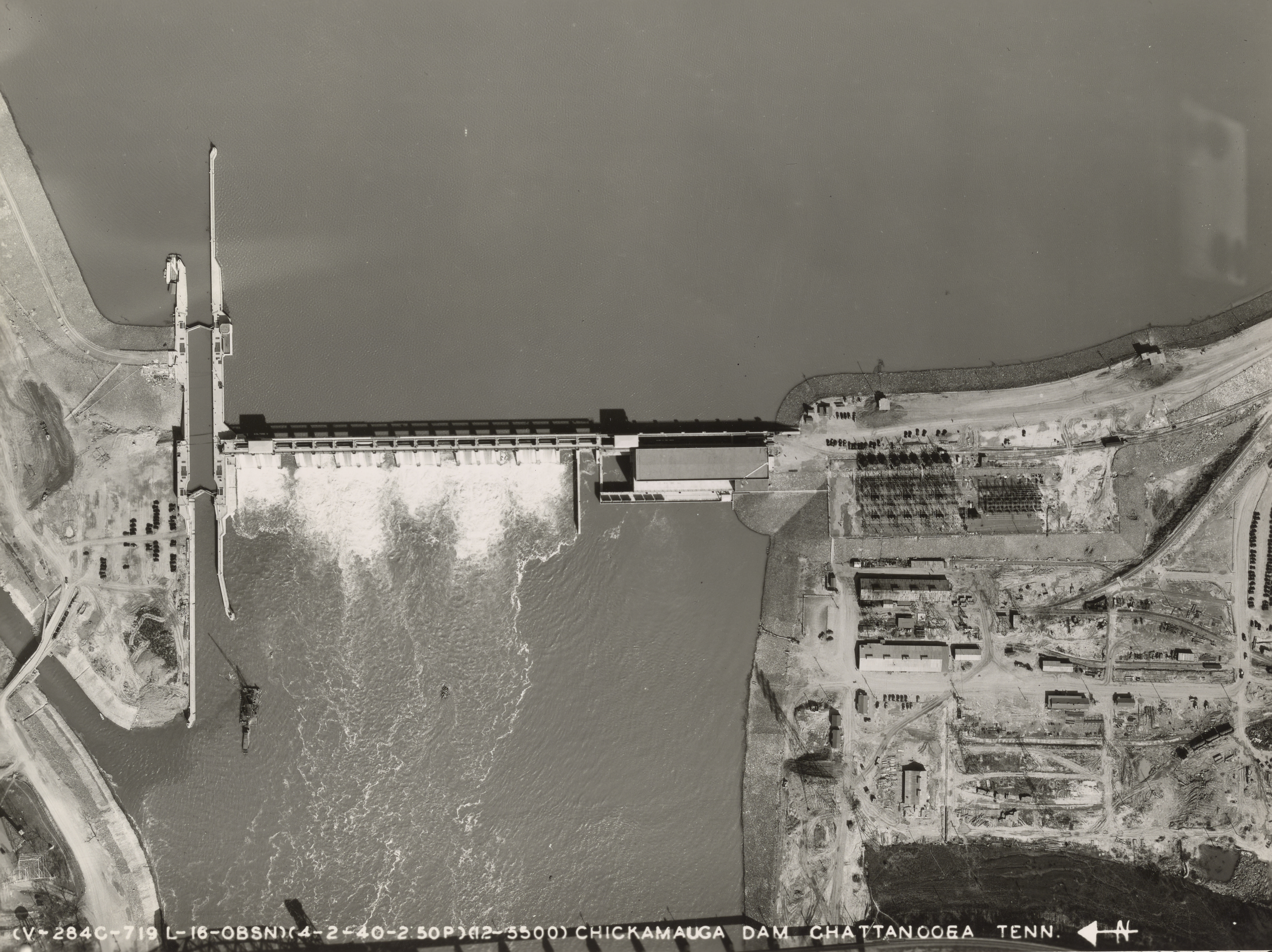
Chickamauga Dam in 1940

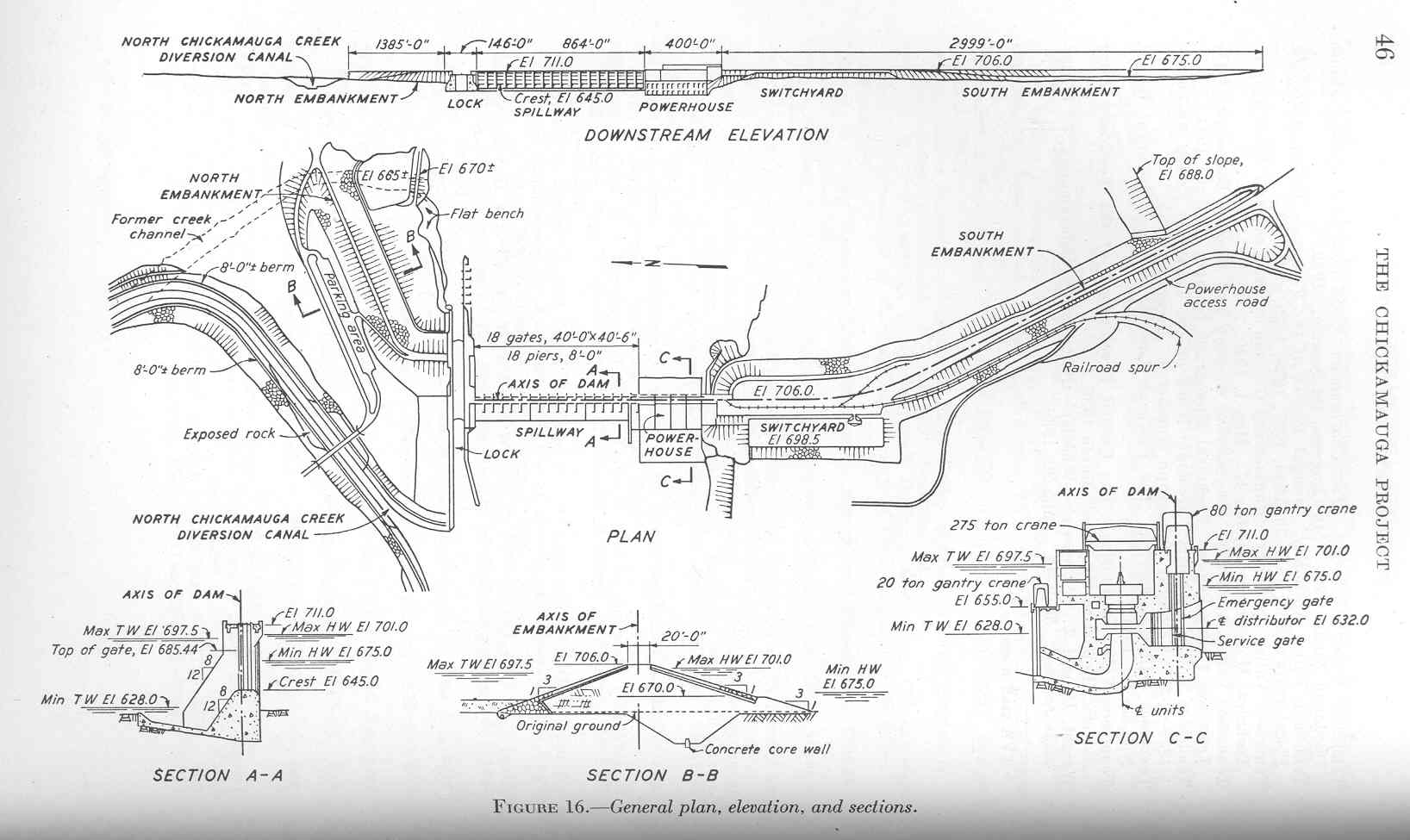
Design plan for Chickamauga Dam, circa 1935

The U.S. Army Corps of Engineers surveyed the Chickamauga Island site in the 1920s as a possible site for a dam to protect Chattanooga, which had suffered serious flood damage in 1867, 1875, 1886, and 1917, and to enhance navigation along the river. When the Tennessee Valley Authority (TVA) was formed in the mid-1930s, it assumed control of navigation and flood control operations in the Tennessee Valley. After extensive surveying, TVA chose the tip of Chickamauga Island over several other sites surveyed by the Army Corps in the vicinity. The Chickamauga project was authorized December 31, 1935, and dam construction began January 13, 1936.

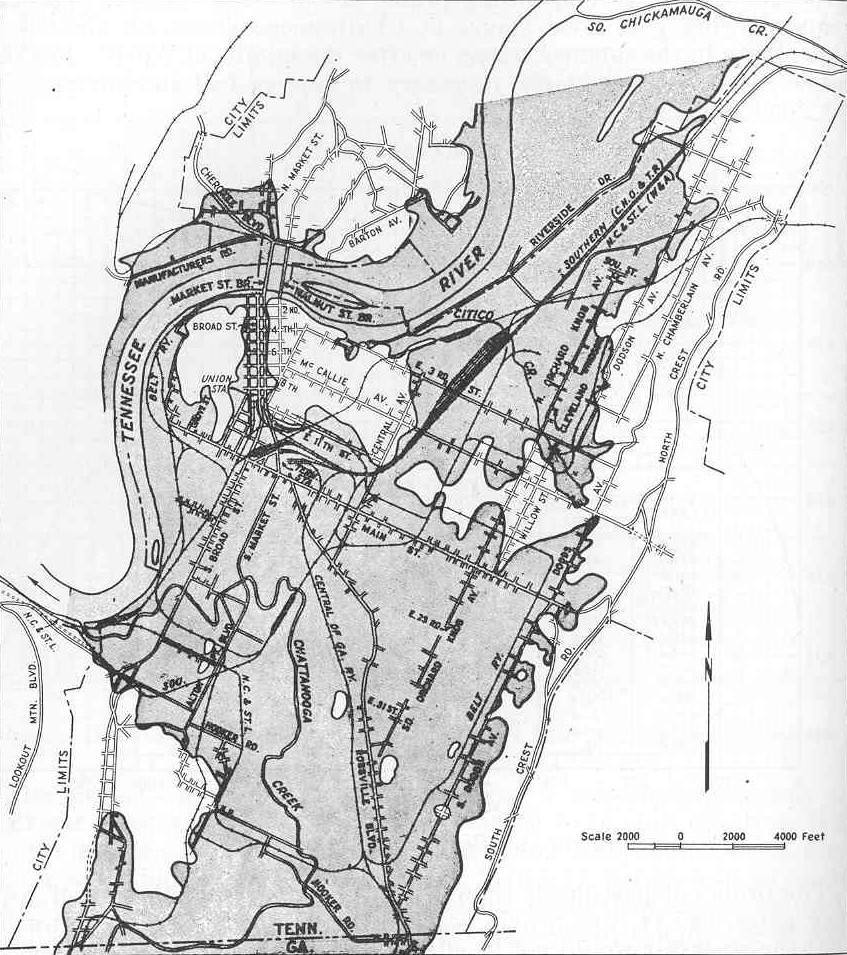
Map showing the parts (shaded) of downtown Chattanooga flooded when the Tennessee River broke its banks in March 1867

The construction of Chickamauga Dam and its reservoir required the purchase of 61,350 acres (24,830 ha) of land, 6,030 acres (2,440 ha) of which were wooded and had to be cleared. 903 families, 24 cemeteries, and 81 miles (130 km) of roads had to be relocated. An embankment was built to protect parts of Dayton, Tennessee from the reservoir's backwaters, and several roads and buildings in the town of Soddy were relocated or modified. A total of 39 bridges affected by the reservoir were either raised or moved.

The navigation lock at Chickamauga Dam was designed by the Army Corps of Engineers, and was based on the lock design at Guntersville Dam. The lock was initially 60 by 360 feet (18 m × 110 m), although the dam was designed in a way that allowed a larger 110 by 600 feet (34 m × 183 m) lock to be installed if increases in river traffic ever required it.

Chickamauga Dam was completed and its gates closed on January 15, 1940, constructed at a cost of $42,065,000 (equivalent to $735 million in 2024). The lock was placed into operation on February 26, 1940, and the first generator went online May 4, 1940. Two recreational areas— Booker T. Washington State Park and Harrison Bay State Park— were developed as segregated parks along Chickamauga Lake's shores, with the former originally being for African Americans and the latter originally being for caucasians.

== Renovations ==
By the early 2000s, the concrete of the original lock had deteriorated due to "concrete growth" caused by chemical reactions between its constituent cement and rock aggregate. A $375 million project to replace the lock began in 2003. The new 110-by-660-foot (34 by 201 m) lock was scheduled to be completed by 2014. Progress was hampered, however, by lack of funding due to the depletion of the Inland Waterways Trust Fund that finances U.S. Army Corps of Engineers work on river navigation infrastructure. Some $52 million in additional funding was made available for the project under the American Recovery and Reinvestment Act of 2009. By 2013, $183 million had been spent, the total estimated cost of the project had grown to $693 million as a result of delays and increasing costs for construction materials, and an additional five years of work was estimated to remain. The existing lock was expected to become unsafe for continued use some time before 2023. As of June 2024, completion of lock repairs is expected by November 2026.

In October 2004 TVA installed a new warning system to alert individuals downstream when the dam is releasing water. The warning measures include strobe lights, signs and alarm horns.

TVA conducts periodic maintenance on Chickamauga Dam using saw-cut expansion holes, a type of expansion joint used in concrete construction. In 2010, engineering contractor S&ME used a Geoprobe drill to open and repair the expansion holes and cut new joints.

== Recreation ==
The Riverpark Area at the Chickamauga Dam has a boat ramp, fishing piers, day-use areas, restrooms, shelter rentals, and walking and biking trails. On the shoals, below the dam, fisherman use conventional and fly tackle to fish for striped bass, large mouth bass, and small mouth bass.

== See also ==
- Hales Bar Dam
- Dams and reservoirs of the Tennessee River
- List of crossings of the Tennessee River
- National Register of Historic Places listings in Hamilton County, Tennessee
