= Chattanooga Metropolitan Airport =

Airport in Chattanooga, Tennessee

Chattanooga Metropolitan Airport Lovell Field

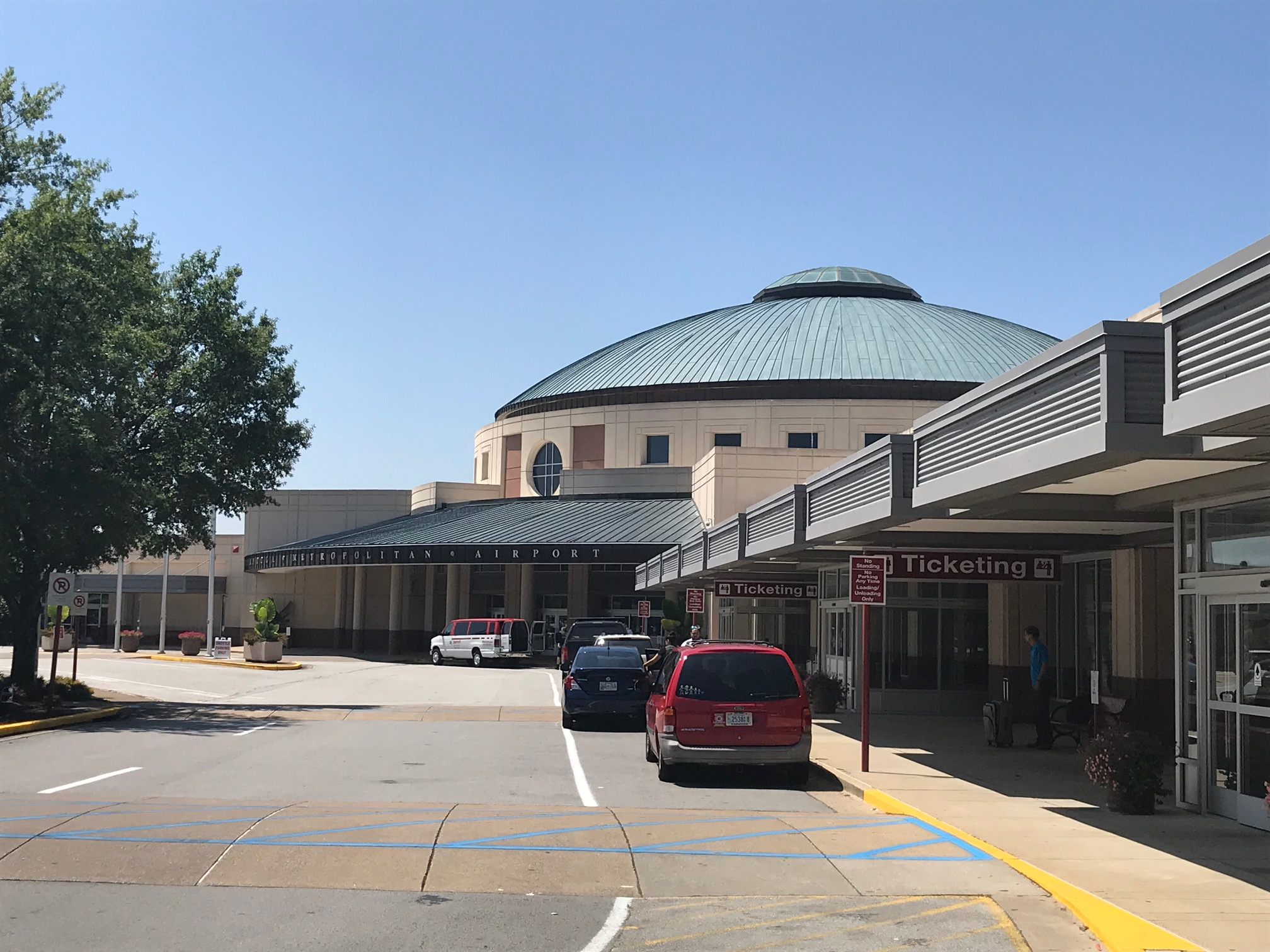
- Passenger terminal
- IATA: CHA; ICAO: KCHA; FAA LID: CHA

Summary
- Airport type: Public
- Owner/Operator: Chattanooga Metropolitan Airport Authority
- Serves: Chattanooga, Tennessee
- Elevation AMSL: 683 ft (208 m)
- Coordinates: 35°02′07″N 85°12′14″W
- Website: www.chattairport.com

Maps
- FAA airport diagram as of January 2021
- Interactive map of Chattanooga Metropolitan Airport

Runways
Direction	Length		Surface
Direction	ft	m	Surface
02/20	7,400	2,256	Asphalt
15/33	5,575	1,699	Asphalt

Statistics (2025)
- Aircraft operations: 83,326
- Passengers: 1,265,736 ▲14.17%
- Source:Website

Chattanooga Metropolitan Airport (IATA: CHA, ICAO: KCHA, FAA LID: CHA) (Lovell Field) is 5 miles (8 km) east of downtown Chattanooga, in Hamilton County, Tennessee, United States. The airport is owned and operated by the Chattanooga Metropolitan Airport Authority. It is a Class C airport serviced by the Chattanooga Airport Traffic Control Tower. The Federal Aviation Administration (FAA) National Plan of Integrated Airport Systems for 2019–2023 categorized it as a small-hub primary commercial service facility.

== History ==
The first scheduled airline flight in Tennessee took place in Chattanooga in 1928 at Marr Field, dedicated in December 1919, named for Walter L. Marr, off present-day Amnicola Highway. Chattanooga was a stopover on the Contract Air Mail route served by Interstate Airlines between Atlanta and Chicago. Charles Lindbergh, the world-famous aviator who had piloted the Spirit of St. Louis over the Atlantic Ocean in May 1927, flew into Marr Field on October 5, 1927.

In 1930, due to the interest and foresight of John Lovell, president of the local Kiwanis Club and American Red Cross, a new Chattanooga Airport opened with an unpaved runway at its present location and was named Lovell Field in his honor. In 1936, the landing area was expanded and runways paved as a part of the New Deal's Works Progress Administration (WPA). The original terminal building was built at that time.

During World War II, Lovell Field was a military training facility. Growth in aviation in the 1950s led to a transfer of airport operations to the City of Chattanooga and airport expansion with a new runway, the primary runway today. The original terminal building, dating from the 1930s, was expanded in 1950 and 1955 by the city before being replaced by a new terminal in 1964.

The airport's ownership was transferred from Chattanooga to the Chattanooga Metropolitan Airport Authority (CMAA) in July 1985.

The current passenger terminal, designed by Gensler, opened in 1992.

In 2011, a 1 megawatt solar farm located on the southwest corner of the airfield was constructed. An additional 1.1 megawatts were added to the solar farm in the summer of 2013. By 2017, the farm was providing approximately 90% of the airport's electricity.

Chattanooga Metropolitan Airport was home to the 241st Engineering Installation Squadron (241 EIS) of the Tennessee Air National Guard until late 2010, when the squadron moved to a Bonny Oaks facility near the airport.

== Facilities ==
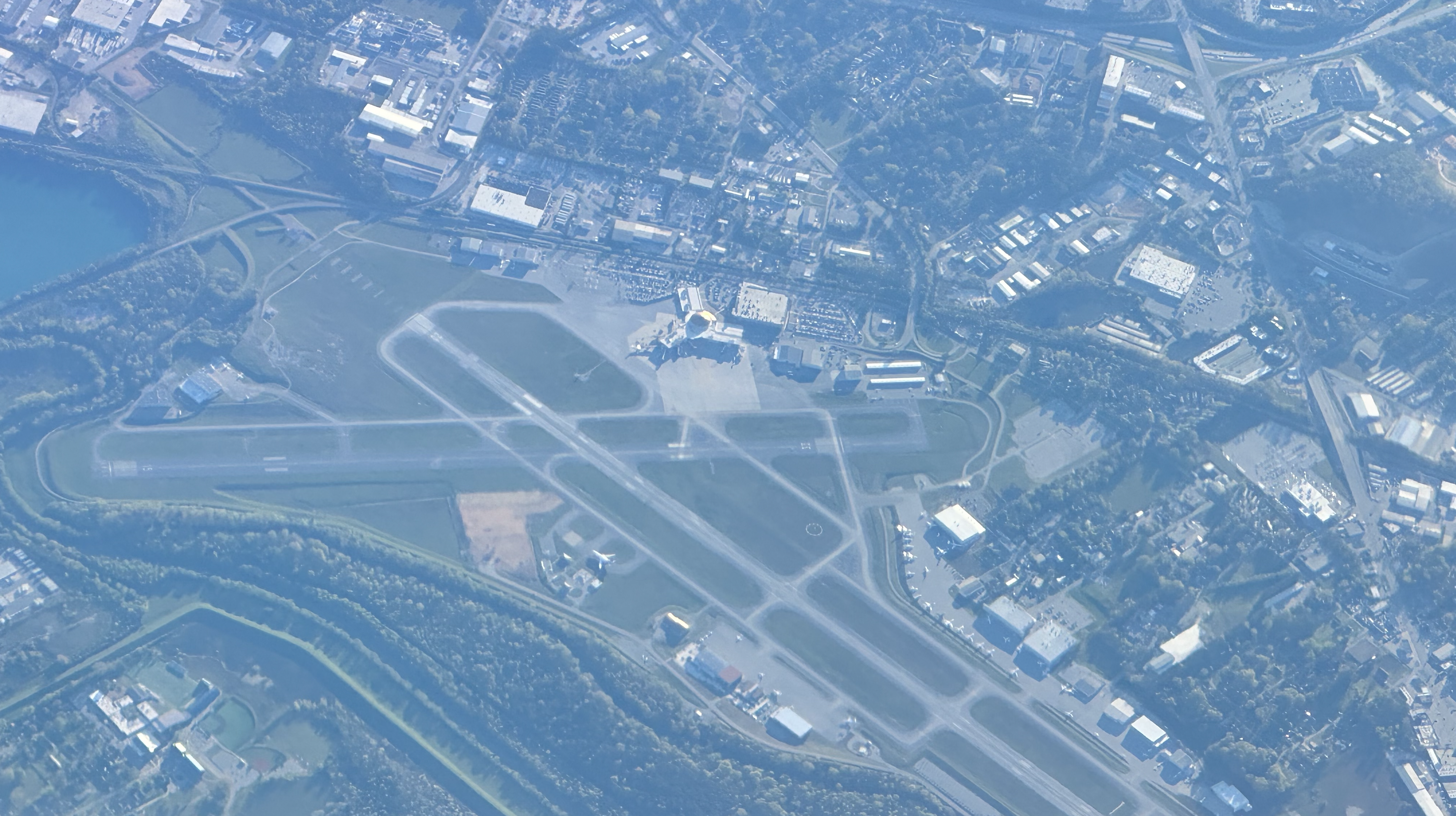
Chattanooga Metropolitan Airport from the air

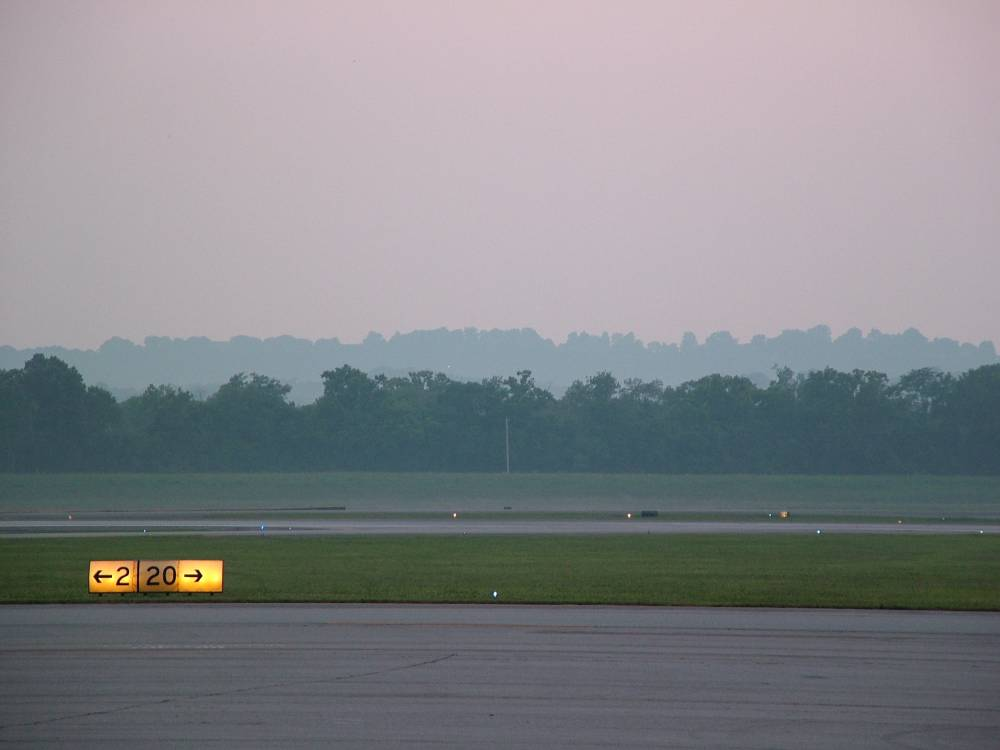
Runway 2-20

=== Runways ===
Lovell Field covers 950 acres (380 ha) and has two asphalt runways: 2/20 is 7,400 x 150 ft (2,256 x 46 m) and 15/33 is 5,575 x 150 ft (1,699 x 46 m).

=== Terminal ===
Chattanooga Metropolitan Airport has one concourse with eight gates. In March 2024, the airport added two additional boarding gates along with a new restaurant, gift shop and business center. This completed an expansion that saw an additional 26,000 square feet of a new terminal wing constructed and 36,000 square feet of the existing terminal renovated. Airline service is provided by United Express, Delta Air Lines, American Eagle, American Airlines, and Allegiant Air. The largest aircraft currently serving the airport is the Boeing 737MAX-8-200 (operated by Allegiant Air) and even the Boeing 757 (operated by FedEx Express). The McDonnell-Douglas MD-80 series aircraft used to be one of the larger aircraft that serviced CHA, but these were retired early because of the COVID-19 pandemic. Delta had flown a mainline service from 1947 until withdrawing in 1995 after 48 years in favor of affiliates like Atlantic Southeast Airlines operating smaller regional jets, such as the CRJ-200. Delta subsequently decided to resume its mainline service flights, including DC-9s, to Chattanooga in September 2012.

=== Other ===
General aviation is serviced by Wilson Air Center FBO. The general aviation ramp is in two locations, one on the south side of the main terminal and the other on the north. The locations are referred to as "Air North" and "Air South." General aviation can find service at either location. In August 2011, Wilson Air Center opened a facility on the west side of the field.

== Airlines and destinations ==
=== Passenger ===
Airlines	Destinations	Refs
Allegiant Air	Fort Lauderdale, Orlando/Sanford, St. Petersburg/Clearwater; Seasonal: Punta Gorda (FL)	
American Airlines	Dallas/Fort Worth	
American Eagle	Charlotte, Chicago–O'Hare, Dallas/Fort Worth, Washington–National; Seasonal: Miami	
Delta Air Lines	Atlanta	
Delta Connection	Atlanta, Detroit, New York–LaGuardia	
United Express	Chicago–O'Hare, Houston–Intercontinental, Newark; Seasonal: Denver	

Destinations map
Destinations from Chattanooga Metropolitan Airport
Red = Year-round destination
Green = Seasonal destination
Blue = Future destination

=== Cargo ===
Airlines	Destinations
FedEx Express	Memphis

== Statistics ==
=== Top destinations ===
Busiest domestic routes from CHA (May 2025 – April 2026)
Rank	City	Passengers	Carriers
1	Atlanta, Georgia	235,341	Delta
2	Charlotte, North Carolina	103,927	American
3	Dallas/Fort Worth, Texas	98,736	American
4	Chicago–O'Hare, Illinois	67,901	American, United
5	Detroit, Michigan	34,843	Delta
6	New York–LaGuardia, New York	22,746	Delta
7	Orlando/Sanford, Florida	17,951	Allegiant
8	St. Petersburg/Clearwater, Florida	17,591	Allegiant
9	Washington–National, D.C.	10,957	American
10	Las Vegas, Nevada	10,561	Allegiant

=== Airline market share ===
Largest airlines at CHA (May 2025 – April 2026)
Rank	Airline	Passengers	Share
1	Delta Air Lines	578,567	44.5%
2	American Airlines	454,967	35.0%
3	United Airlines	123,182	9.5%
4	Allegiant Air	112,877	8.7%
5	Spirit Airlines	22,538	1.7%
	Other	6,904	0.5%

=== Annual traffic ===
CHA Airport annual passengers enplaned + deplaned, 2008–present
Year	Passengers	Year	Passengers
2007	609,218	2017	957,064
2008	596,639	2018	1,002,414
2009	614,578	2019	1,104,662
2010	579,868	2020	447,864
2011	608,886	2021	750,896
2012	616,928	2022	861,097
2013	618,838	2023	972,235
2014	701,665	2024	1,108,602
2015	778,183	2025	1,265,736
2016	836,983	2026	

== 2020s airport expansion ==
In the 2020-2021 time-frame, a multi-story car park was built. In addition, despite the COVID-19 pandemic the number of gates was expanded to eight as part of the expansion plans due to record numbers of passengers using the airport pre-COVID. The 28 million dollar expansion was opened March 2024.

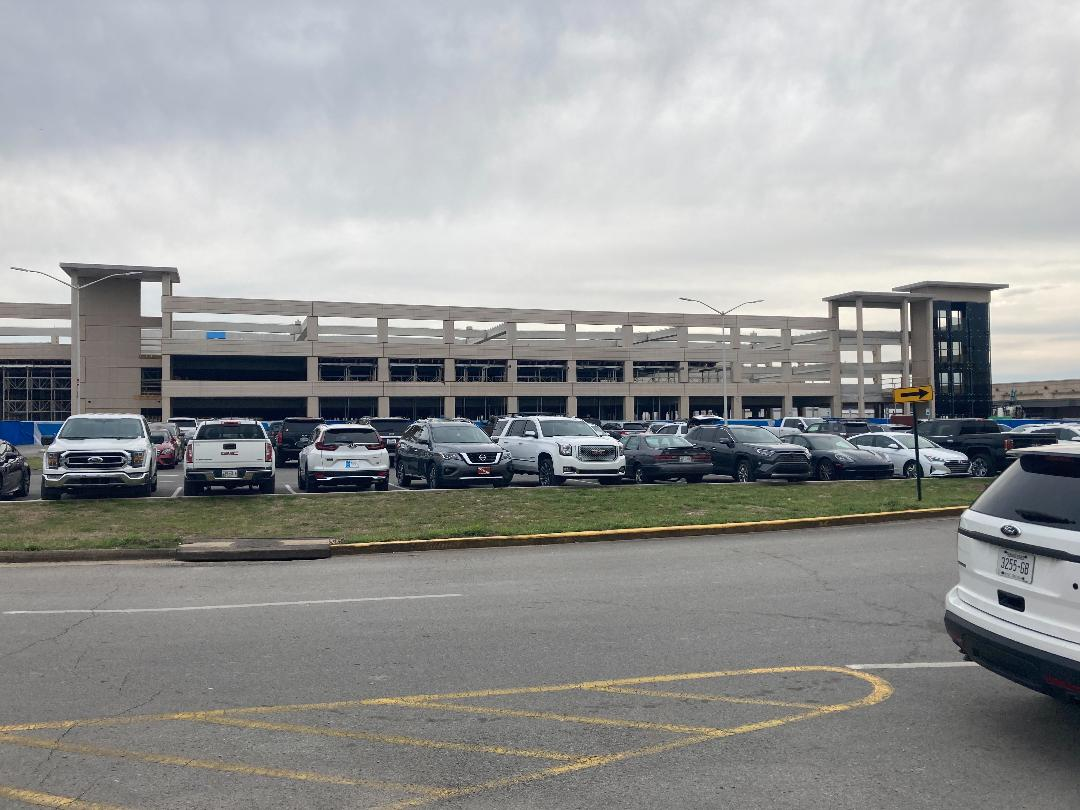
New parking garage under construction in March 2021

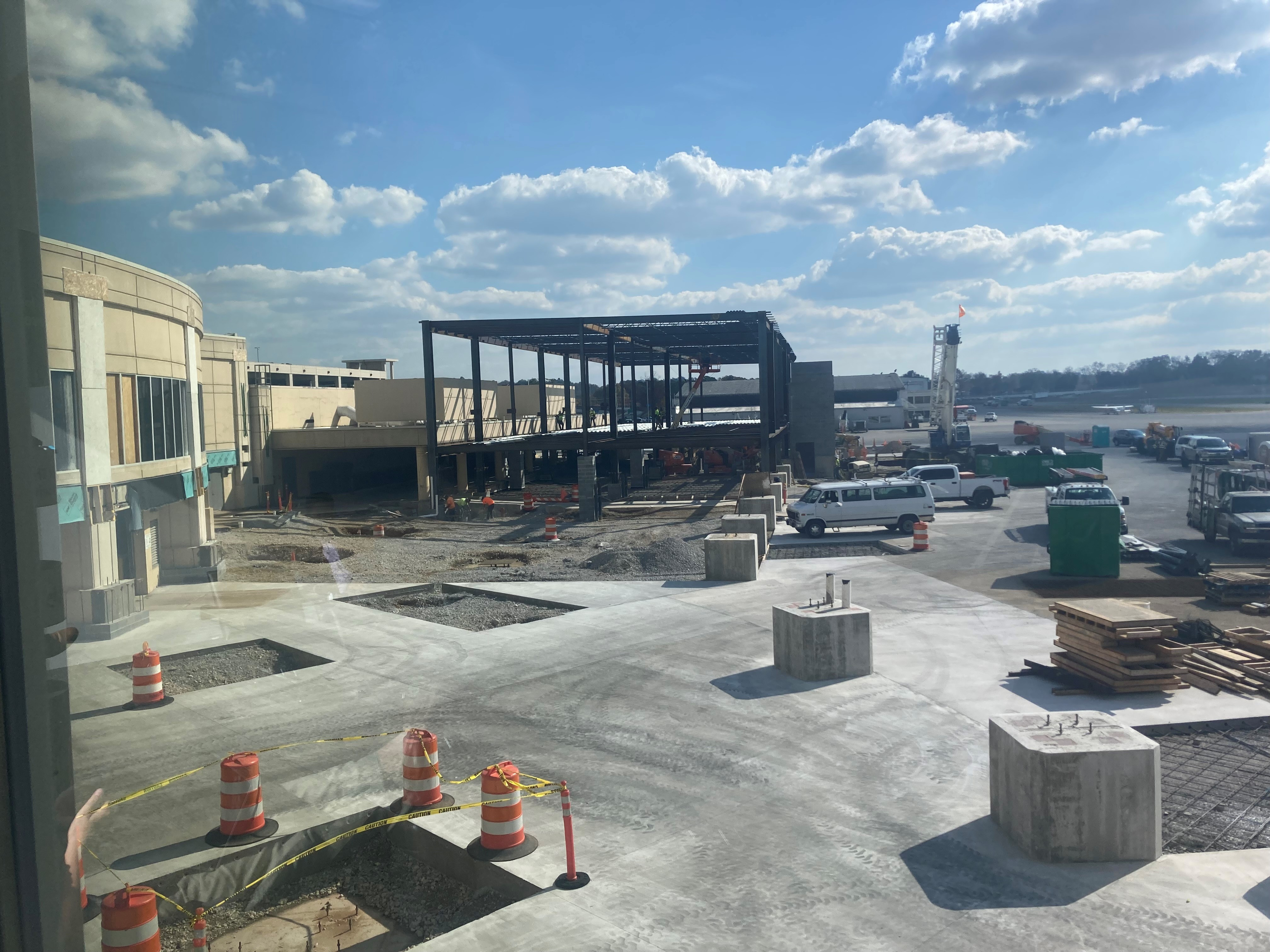
CHA airport terminal expansion in progress November 2022

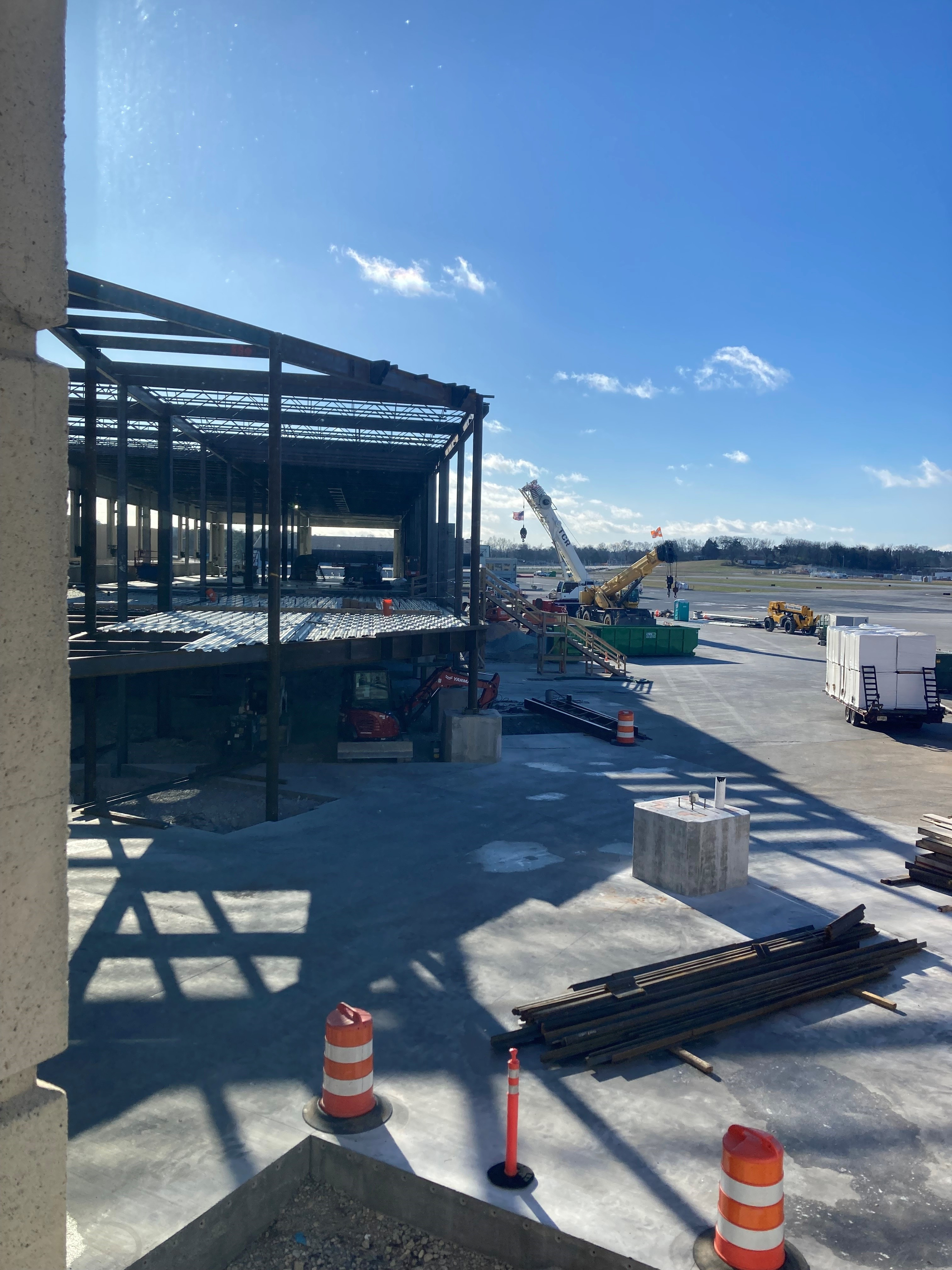
Chattanooga airport new terminal being built December 23, 2022

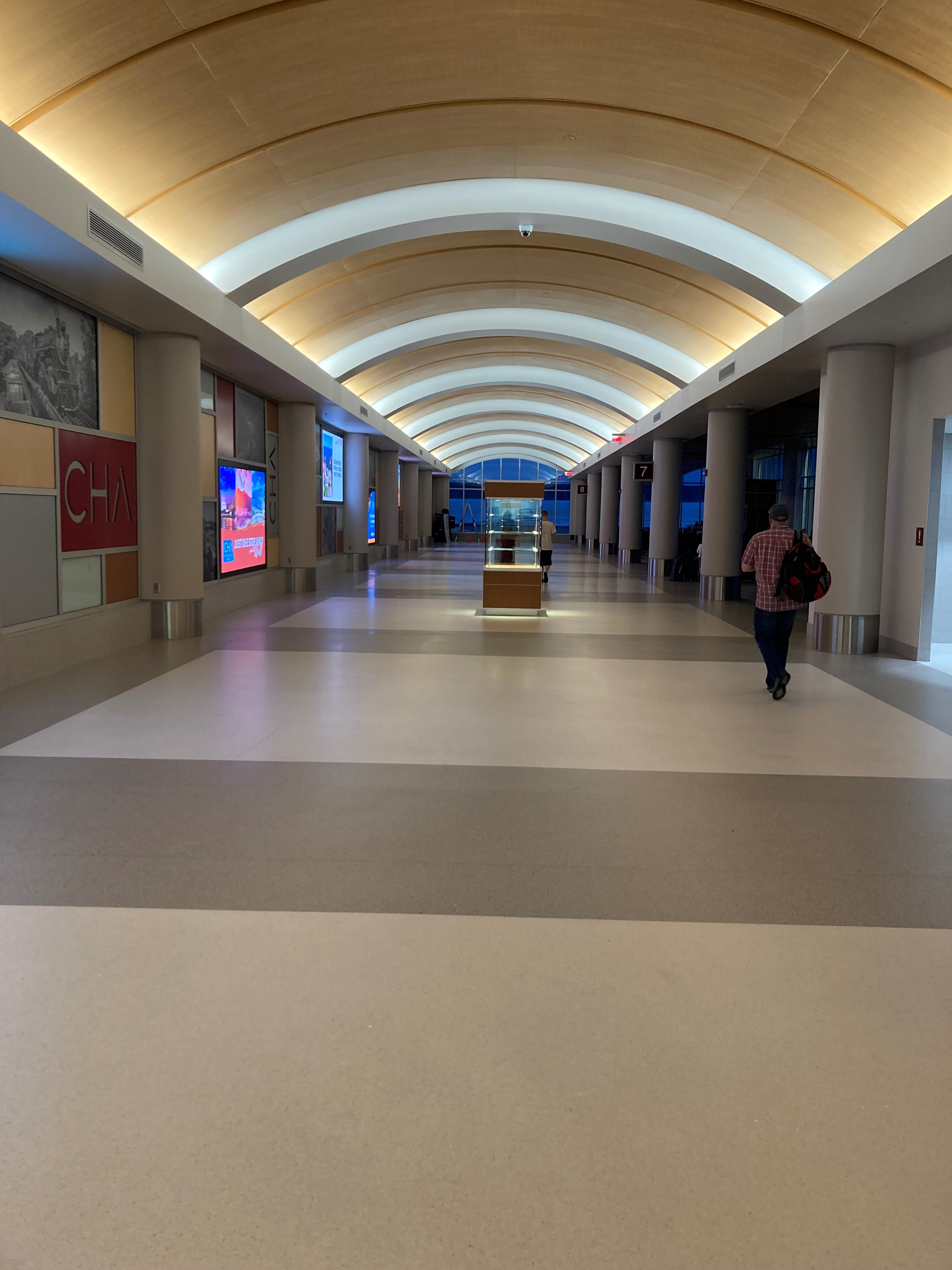
New terminal gates at CHA May 2024

== Accidents and incidents ==
- On November 11, 1972, Southern Airways Flight 49, a hijacked McDonnell Douglas DC-9 with 31 passengers and 3 crew members aboard, landed at Lovell Field from Knoxville's McGhee Tyson Airport to pick up $10 million that the three hijackers had demanded. After picking up the ransom money, which actually amounted to between $2 million and $2.5 million, the plane took off, bound for Havana, Cuba.
- On November 27, 1973, Delta Air Lines Flight 516, a McDonnell Douglas DC-9, crashed short of the runway in severe weather on approach to the airport from Atlanta's Hartsfield Atlanta International Airport. The airliner burst into flames that were quickly extinguished in part by torrential rains and deep standing water where the aircraft ended up. Thirty-eight passengers and four crew were injured in the incident and the aircraft was damaged beyond repair.
- On October 4, 2023, FedEx Express Flight 1376, a Boeing 757-200SF (N977FD), skidded off the end of Runway 20 landing with gear up after experiencing a hydraulic failure after departure for Memphis International Airport. The crew made it out uninjured, but the aircraft was substantially damaged and was written off.

== See also ==
- List of airports in Tennessee
