= Lakesite, Tennessee =

- City
- Motto: A Great Place to Call Home
- Location of Lakesite in Hamilton County, Tennessee.
- Coordinates: 35°12′21″N 85°8′11″W
- Country: United States
- State: Tennessee
- County: Hamilton
- Incorporated: 1972

Government
  - Type: Manager-Commission
  - Mayor: David Howell
  - Vice Mayor: Bobby Bishop

Area
  - Total: 1.74 sq mi (4.51 km^{2})
  - Land: 1.74 sq mi (4.51 km^{2})
  - Water: 0 sq mi (0.00 km^{2})
- Elevation: 748 ft (228 m)

Population (2020)
  - Total: 1,856
  - Density: 1,066.6/sq mi (411.81/km^{2})
- Time zone: UTC-5 (Eastern (EST))
  - Summer (DST): UTC-4 (EDT)
- Zip codes: 37343, 37379
- FIPS code: 47-40540
- GNIS feature ID: 1290516
- Website: http://www.lakesitetn.gov/

Lakesite is a city in Hamilton County, Tennessee, United States. The population was 1,856 at the 2020 census. It is a northern suburb of the Chattanooga, TN–GA Metropolitan Statistical Area, located 15 miles north of the city.

== Geography ==
Lakesite is located at 35°12′21″N 85°8′11″W (35.205735, -85.136357).

According to the United States Census Bureau, the city has a total area of 1.7 square miles (4.4 km^{2}), all of it land.

== Demographics ==
Historical population
Census	Pop.	Note	%±
1980	651		—
1990	732		12.4%
2000	1,845		152.0%
2010	1,826		−1.0%
2020	1,856		1.6%

=== Racial and ethnic composition ===
Lakesite city, Tennessee – Racial and ethnic composition Note: the US Census treats Hispanic/Latino as an ethnic category. This table excludes Latinos from the racial categories and assigns them to a separate category. Hispanics/Latinos may be of any race.
Race / Ethnicity (NH = Non-Hispanic)	Pop 2000	Pop 2010	Pop 2020	% 2000	% 2010	% 2020
White alone (NH)	1,813	1,737	1,692	98.27%	95.13%	91.16%
Black or African American alone (NH)	11	14	14	0.60%	0.77%	0.75%
Native American or Alaska Native alone (NH)	0	7	1	0.00%	0.38%	0.05%
Asian alone (NH)	7	16	18	0.38%	0.88%	0.97%
Native Hawaiian or Pacific Islander alone (NH)	0	0	2	0.00%	0.00%	0.11%
Other race alone (NH)	0	0	4	0.00%	0.00%	0.22%
Mixed race or Multiracial (NH)	6	19	76	0.33%	1.04%	4.09%
Hispanic or Latino (any race)	8	33	49	0.43%	1.81%	2.64%
Total	1,845	1,826	1,856	100.00%	100.00%	100.00%

=== 2020 census ===
As of the 2020 census, Lakesite had a population of 1,856. The median age was 42.8 years; 22.0% of residents were under the age of 18 and 17.6% were 65 years of age or older. For every 100 females there were 94.3 males, and for every 100 females age 18 and over there were 94.0 males age 18 and over.

100.0% of residents lived in urban areas, while 0.0% lived in rural areas.

There were 720 households in Lakesite, of which 34.2% had children under the age of 18 living in them. Of all households, 63.2% were married-couple households, 13.3% were households with a male householder and no spouse or partner present, and 18.6% were households with a female householder and no spouse or partner present. About 15.4% of all households were made up of individuals and 7.5% had someone living alone who was 65 years of age or older.

There were 758 housing units, of which 5.0% were vacant. The homeowner vacancy rate was 0.0% and the rental vacancy rate was 0.0%.

Racial composition as of the 2020 census
Race	Number	Percent
White	1,717	92.5%
Black or African American	14	0.8%
American Indian and Alaska Native	2	0.1%
Asian	18	1.0%
Native Hawaiian and Other Pacific Islander	2	0.1%
Some other race	7	0.4%
Two or more races	96	5.2%

=== 2000 census ===
As of the census of 2000, there was a population of 1,845, with 653 households and 557 families residing in the city. The population density was 1,069.6 inhabitants per square mile (413.0/km^{2}). There were 706 housing units at an average density of 409.3 per square mile (158.0/km^{2}). The racial makeup of the city was 98.70% White, 0.60% African American, 0.38% Asian, and 0.33% from two or more races. Hispanic or Latino of any race were 0.43% of the population.

There were 653 households, out of which 41.2% had children under the age of 18 living with them, 73.8% were married couples living together, 9.0% had a female householder with no husband present, and 14.7% were non-families. 11.8% of all households were made up of individuals, and 3.1% had someone living alone who was 65 years of age or older. The average household size was 2.83 and the average family size was 3.07.

In the city, the population was spread out, with 27.4% under the age of 18, 6.7% from 18 to 24, 31.2% from 25 to 44, 25.9% from 45 to 64, and 8.8% who were 65 years of age or older. The median age was 38 years. For every 100 females, there were 96.7 males. For every 100 females age 18 and over, there were 93.8 males.

The median income for a household in the city was $54,219, and the median income for a family was $62,981. Males had a median income of $47,171 versus $26,111 for females. The per capita income for the city was $22,831. About 5.3% of families and 7.5% of the population were below the poverty line, including 8.0% of those under age 18 and 15.1% of those age 65 or over.

== History ==
Lakesite was incorporated in 1972 from the efforts of Ray Dodson and Hans Bingham. Upon incorporating, the suburb consisted of 200 homes and a population of 500. In 1994 the neighborhood had grown to about 900 and residents petitioned the Lakesite City Commission for annexation. Upon the annexation, which was completed in mid-1995, the population grew to 1,499 and the land increased 66%.

== Government ==
The government of Lakesite is run by a manager-commission charter. The commission consists of five members who are elected at-large for four-year terms. The commission then elects a mayor and a vice mayor. Each commission is assigned a chair position to oversee aspects of the city including public safety, budget and finance, parks and recreation, and public works.

== Education ==
Lakesite is home to two schools: McConnell Elementary and Loftis Middle School.
