= Middle Valley, Tennessee =

- Census-designated place
- Location of Middle Valley, Tennessee
- Coordinates: 35°11′21″N 85°11′28″W
- Country: United States
- State: Tennessee
- County: Hamilton

Area
  - Total: 9.84 sq mi (25.48 km^{2})
  - Land: 9.76 sq mi (25.29 km^{2})
  - Water: 0.077 sq mi (0.20 km^{2})
- Elevation: 699 ft (213 m)

Population (2020)
  - Total: 11,695
  - Density: 1,198/sq mi (462.5/km^{2})
- Time zone: UTC-5 (Eastern (EST))
  - Summer (DST): UTC-4 (EDT)
- FIPS code: 47-48360
- GNIS feature ID: 1293703

Middle Valley is a census-designated place (CDP) in Hamilton County, Tennessee, United States. The population was 11,695 at the 2020 census. It is part of the Chattanooga, TN–GA Metropolitan Statistical Area.

== Geography ==
Middle Valley is located at 35°11′21″N 85°11′28″W (35.189120, -85.191060).

According to the United States Census Bureau, the CDP has a total area of 10.8 square miles (28 km^{2}), of which, 10.7 square miles (28 km^{2}) of it is land and 0.1 square miles (0.26 km^{2}) of it (0.81%) is water.

== Demographics ==
Historical population
Census	Pop.	Note	%±
2020	11,695		—
U.S. Decennial Census

=== 2020 census ===
Middle Valley racial composition
Race	Number	Percentage
White (non-Hispanic)	10,210	87.3%
Black or African American (non-Hispanic)	418	3.57%
Native American	20	0.17%
Asian	203	1.74%
Pacific Islander	3	0.03%
Other/Mixed	526	4.5%
Hispanic or Latino	315	2.69%

As of the 2020 census, Middle Valley had a population of 11,695. The median age was 42.6 years. 21.5% of residents were under the age of 18 and 21.8% of residents were 65 years of age or older. For every 100 females, there were 95.7 males, and for every 100 females age 18 and over there were 92.6 males age 18 and over.

100.0% of residents lived in urban areas, while 0.0% lived in rural areas.

There were 4,556 households and 3,413 families in Middle Valley, of which 29.7% had children under the age of 18 living in them. Of all households, 58.8% were married-couple households, 13.6% were households with a male householder and no spouse or partner present, and 22.4% were households with a female householder and no spouse or partner present. About 21.2% of all households were made up of individuals and 10.9% had someone living alone who was 65 years of age or older.

There were 4,759 housing units, of which 4.3% were vacant. The homeowner vacancy rate was 0.7% and the rental vacancy rate was 5.5%.

=== 2000 census ===
As of the census of 2000, there were 11,854 people, 4,294 households, and 3,572 families residing in the CDP. The population density was 977.1 inhabitants per square mile (377.3/km^{2}). There were 4,459 housing units at an average density of 367.5 per square mile (141.9/km^{2}). The racial makeup of the CDP was 95.90% White, 1.87% African American, 0.27% Native American, 1.04% Asian, 0.03% Pacific Islander, 0.26% from other races, and 0.63% from two or more races. Hispanic or Latino of any race were 0.80% of the population.

There were 4,294 households, out of which 37.5% had children under the age of 18 living with them, 70.7% were married couples living together, 9.4% had a female householder with no husband present, and 16.8% were non-families. 14.3% of all households were made up of individuals, and 5.3% had someone living alone who was 65 years of age or older. The average household size was 2.76 and the average family size was 3.04.

In the CDP, the population was spread out, with 25.7% under the age of 18, 7.5% from 18 to 24, 29.4% from 25 to 44, 27.9% from 45 to 64, and 9.5% who were 65 years of age or older. The median age was 38 years. For every 100 females, there were 95.4 males. For every 100 females age 18 and over, there were 92.3 males.

The median income for a household in the CDP was $52,534, and the median income for a family was $57,596. Males had a median income of $39,802 versus $26,313 for females. The per capita income for the CDP was $22,151. About 4.6% of families and 5.4% of the population were below the poverty line, including 6.5% of those under age 18 and 8.9% of those age 65 or over.

== Education ==
Middle Valley has three schools:

- Middle Valley Elementary
- McConnell Elementary (Lakesite, TN)
- Loftis Middle School (Lakesite, TN)
