= Suuronen =

Suuronen is a surname. Notable people with the surname include:

- Matti Suuronen (1933–2013), Finnish architect and designer
- Toni Suuronen (born 1995), Finnish ice hockey player
- Minna Suuronen (born 1968), Finnish actress
