= Spaceship House =

1973 flying saucer-shaped house in Chattanooga, Tennessee, US

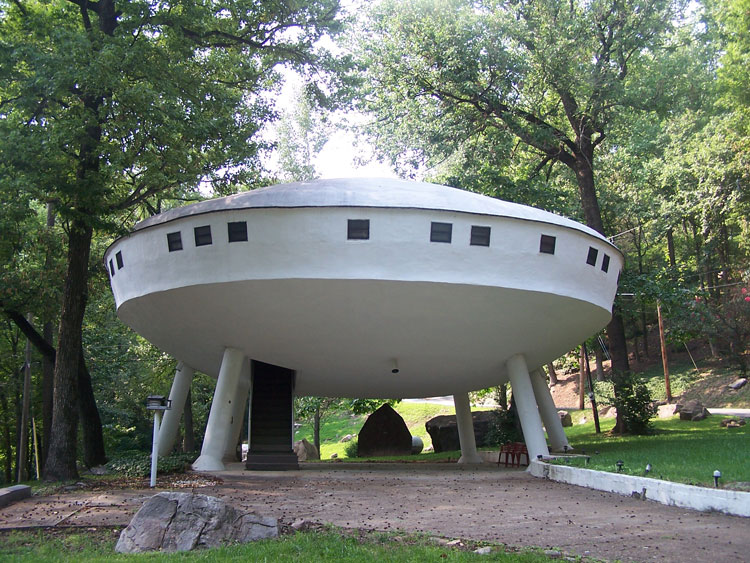
- Spaceship House, 2007
- Interactive map of Spaceship House
- Location: 1408 Palisades Road; Chattanooga, Tennessee, US
- Coordinates: 35°06′23″N 85°20′54″W
- Architect: Curtis W. King
- Architectural style: Modernist
- Owner: Private

The Spaceship House (also known as the Space House) is a flying saucer–shaped modernist house on Signal Mountain in Chattanooga, Tennessee, United States. Designed and built by Chattanooga builder Curtis W. King as a bachelor pad for his sons, the circular house has since become a local landmark on U.S. Route 127.

== Design ==
The house has a structural steel frame covered in concrete and coated with fiberglass. The house, which weighs between 55 and 60 short tons (50 and 54 t), sits on six slanted columnar legs, through which the house's plumbing and electrical lines run.

Initially, the exterior of the house featured square windows at evenly spaced intervals, some of which were later blocked by interior renovations. The house—52 ft (16 m) in diameter—includes 1,960 sq ft (182 m^{2}) of space, with three bedrooms, two bathrooms, and a bar. All rooms are oriented around a central point that was originally a cylindrical skylit bedroom. The interior was originally carpeted with shag on the floors and walls. The master bathroom included a concrete tub overlaid with Japanese tile.

The house included parking underneath the structure with a minimum clearance of 6 ft (1.8 m). Access to the house was provided by an electrically retractable staircase, which later broke and was permanently fixed in the down position.

== History ==
King spent $250,000 ($1.34 million in 2024) on the house, which was built from 1970 to 1973. He intended it to be a model for futuristic residences. Local interest in the project meant frequent visitors during construction, with King estimating 20,000–30,000 people visited during that time. Approximately 500 people visited the Spaceship House when it was completed on Thanksgiving Day 1973. Among the futuristic features King included were a microwave oven, a trash compactor and a closed-circuit TV system to screen visitors.

The home has changed hands numerous times, selling in 2007 for $165,000 and then being auctioned in 2008 for $119,000. As of 2013, it was being offered as a vacation rental.

== See also ==
- Dymaxion house
- Futuro
- Jetsons house (Tulsa)
- Sanzhi UFO houses
- Sculptured House
- Volcano House, California
