= Futuro =

Prefabricated house designed by Matti Suuronen

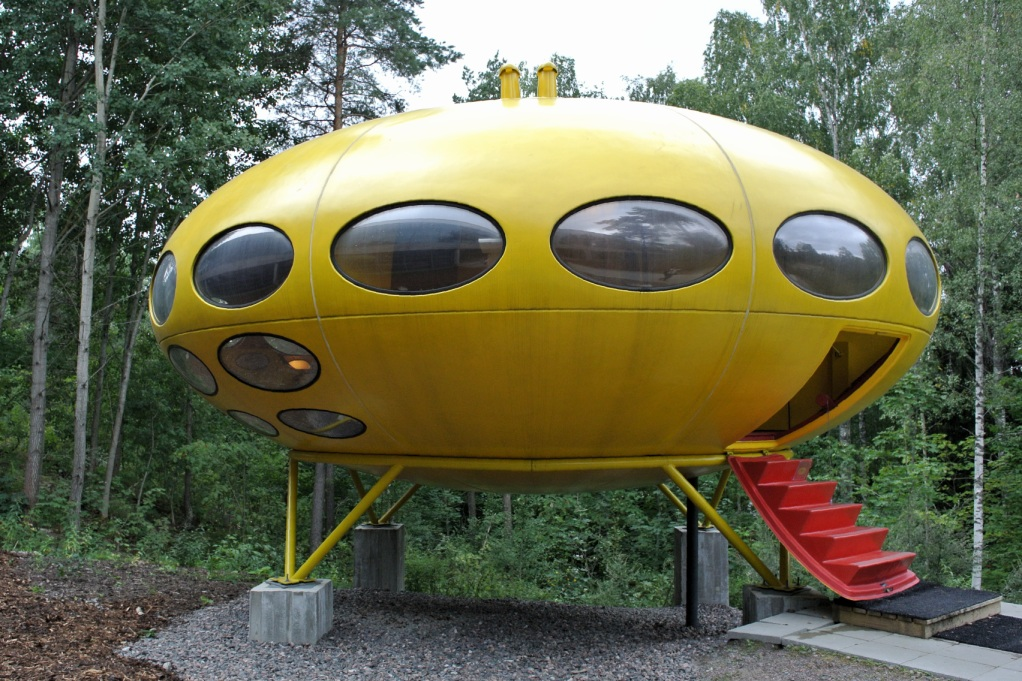
A Futuro at Espoo Museum of Modern Art, Finland

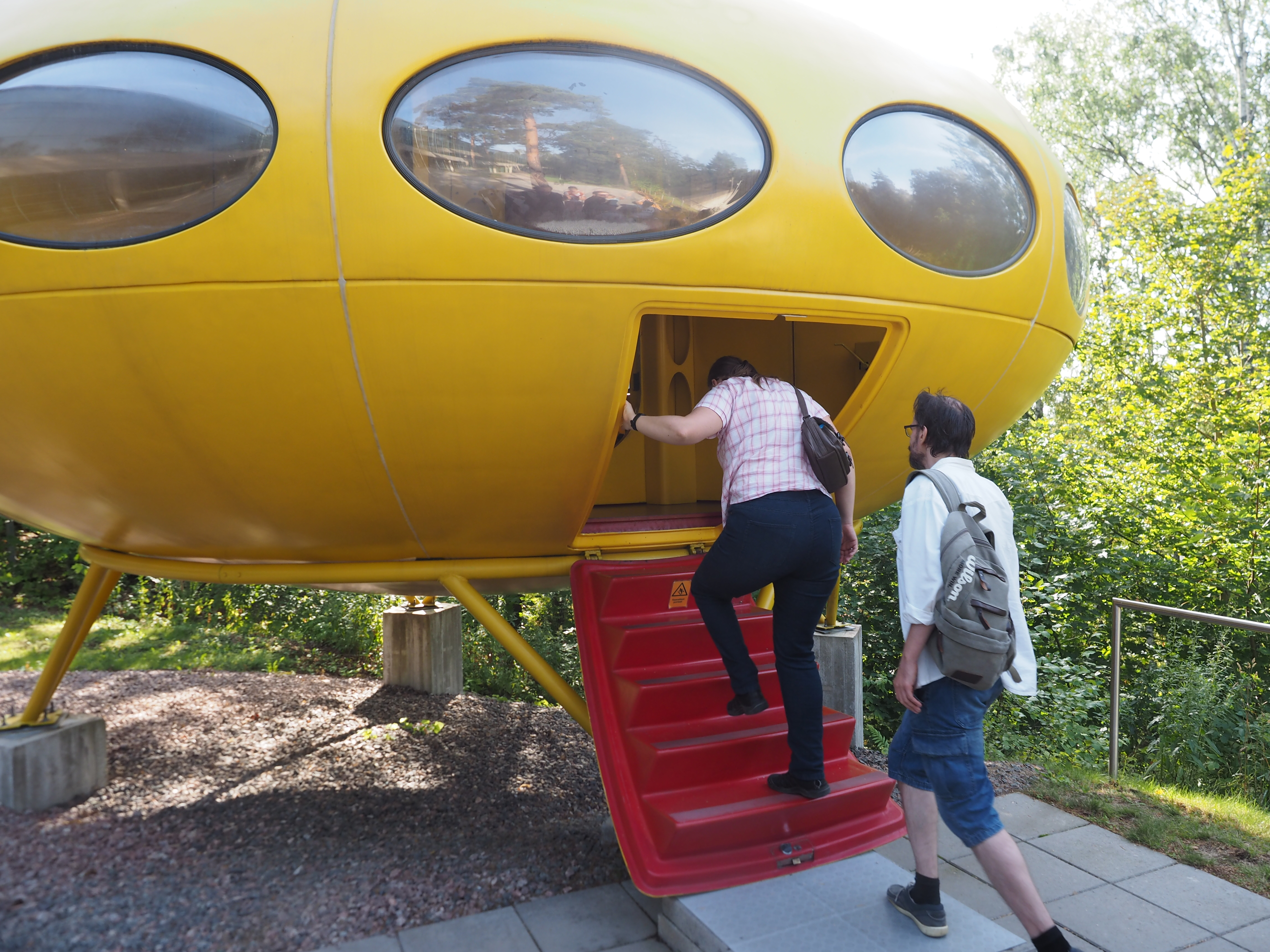
Entrance to a Futuro

A Futuro house or Futuro Pod is a round, prefabricated house designed by Finnish architect Matti Suuronen, of which fewer than 100 were built during the late 1960s and early 1970s. The shape, reminiscent of a flying saucer, and the structure's airplane-hatch entrance, has made the houses sought after by collectors. The Futuro is composed of fiberglass-reinforced polyester plastic, polyester-polyurethane, and poly(methyl methacrylate), measuring 4 metres (13 feet) high and 8 metres (26 feet) in diameter.

== History ==
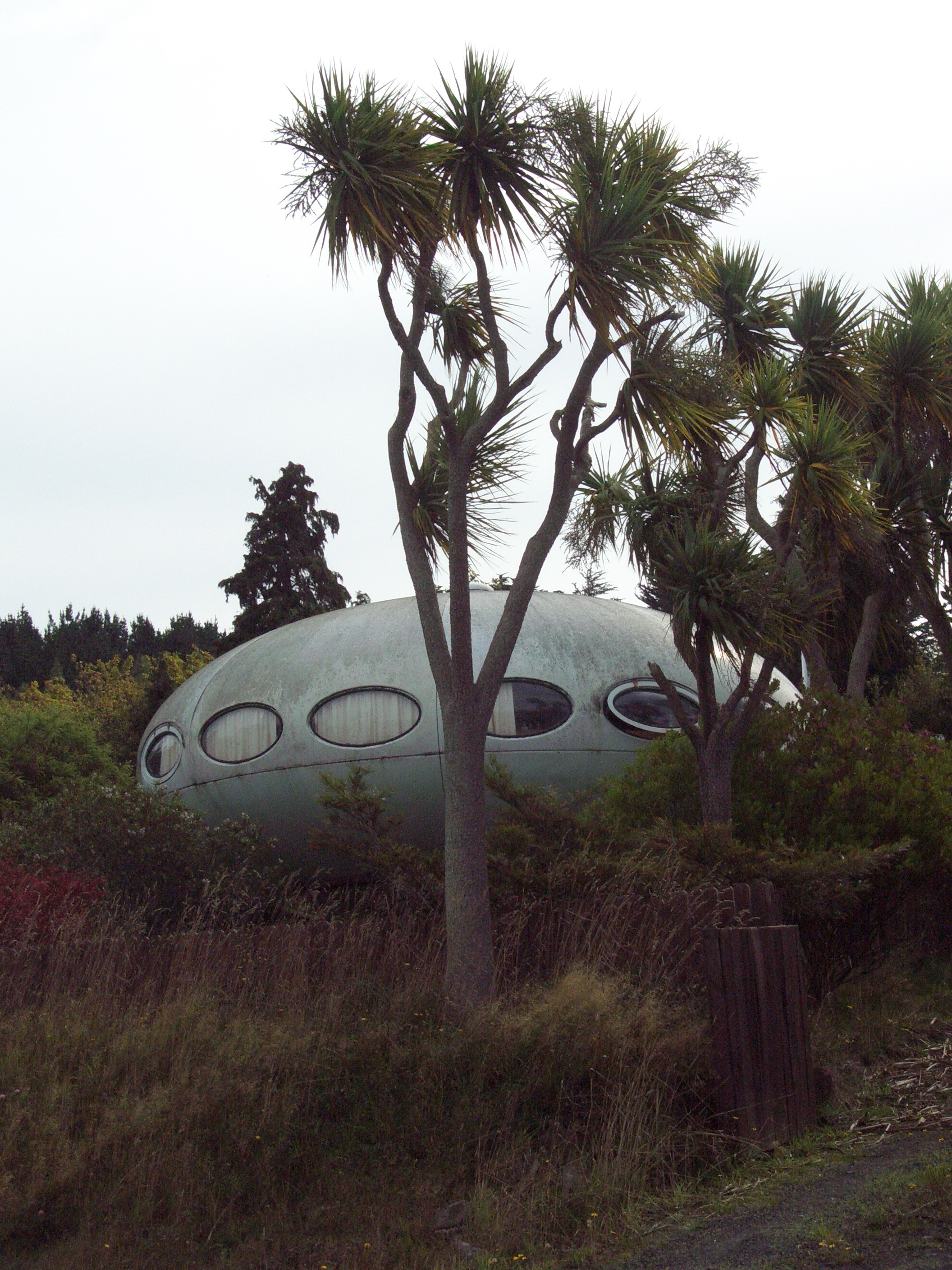
A Futuro in Warrington, New Zealand

The Futuro was a product of post-war Finland, reflecting the period's faith in technology, the conquering of space, unprecedented economic growth, and an increase in leisure time. It was designed by the architect Matti Suuronen as a ski cabin that would be "quick to heat and easy to construct in rough terrain". The result was a transportable home that had the ability to be mass-replicated and situated in almost any environment.

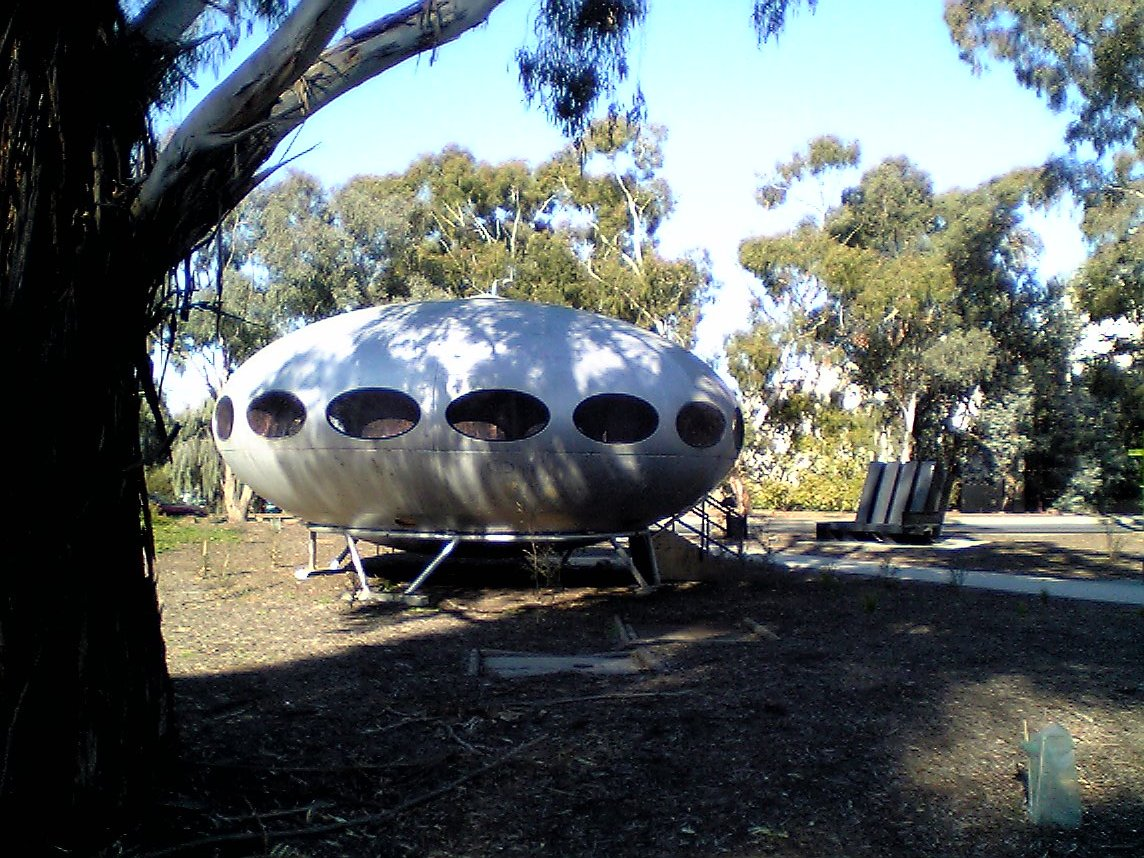
Futuro at the University of Canberra, Australia

The material chosen for the project—fiberglass-reinforced polyester plastic—was familiar to Suuronen and was previously used in the design of a large plastic dome for the roof of a grain silo in Seinäjoki. To facilitate transport, the house consisted of 16 elements that were bolted together to form the floor and roof. The project could be constructed on-site, or dismantled and reassembled on-site in two days, or even airlifted in one piece by helicopter to the site. The only necessity on-site for its placement were four concrete piers, so the project could occupy nearly any topography. Due to the integrated polyurethane insulation and electric heating system, the house could be heated to a comfortable temperature in only thirty minutes, from -29 to +16 °C (-20 to +60 °F).

An excerpt from a February 1970 copy of Architecture d'aujourd'hui describes the Futuro as:

the first model in a series of holiday homes to be licensed in 50 countries, already mass-produced in the United States, Australia and Belgium. The segments of the elliptic envelope are assembled on the site using a metal footing. Through its shape and materials used, the house can be erected in very cold mountains or even by the sea. The area is 50 sq m, the volume 140 cubic m, divided by adaptable partitions.

By the mid-1970s, the Futuro was taken off the market, having been poorly received since its inception—its avant-garde construction, appearance, and materials having negatively influenced public acceptance.

The first Futuro that was erected near Lake Puulavesi in Finland elicited public protest because it looked too unnatural for the rustic environment. In the United States, Futuros were banned from many municipalities by zoning regulations. Banks were reluctant to finance them. Some were vandalised. Some customers who had committed to buy them backed out and forfeited their non-refundable $1,000 deposits ($5,983 adjusted for inflation). Some were destroyed.

The oil crisis of 1973 led to an abrupt halt in plastic production. Synthetics became very expensive to produce. Additionally, public views of plastics were shifting from a miracle material to an ecological concern. These problems provide context to the discontinuation of the Futuro. Fewer than 100 were made, and in 2015, it was estimated that around 60 survived, including in Australia, Denmark, Estonia, Finland, France, Germany, Greece, Japan, the Netherlands, New Zealand, Norway, Ukraine, Russia, Sweden, South Africa, Taiwan, the United Kingdom, and the United States, owned mostly by private individuals. The prototype (serial number 000) is in the collection of Museum Boijmans Van Beuningen in Rotterdam, in the Netherlands. The Futuro no. 001, the only other unit currently in a public collection, is in the possession of the WeeGee Exhibition Centre in Espoo, Finland.

As of July 2026, a new Futuro was being built in Pieksämäki, Finland, for exhibition purposes.

=== Conservation ===
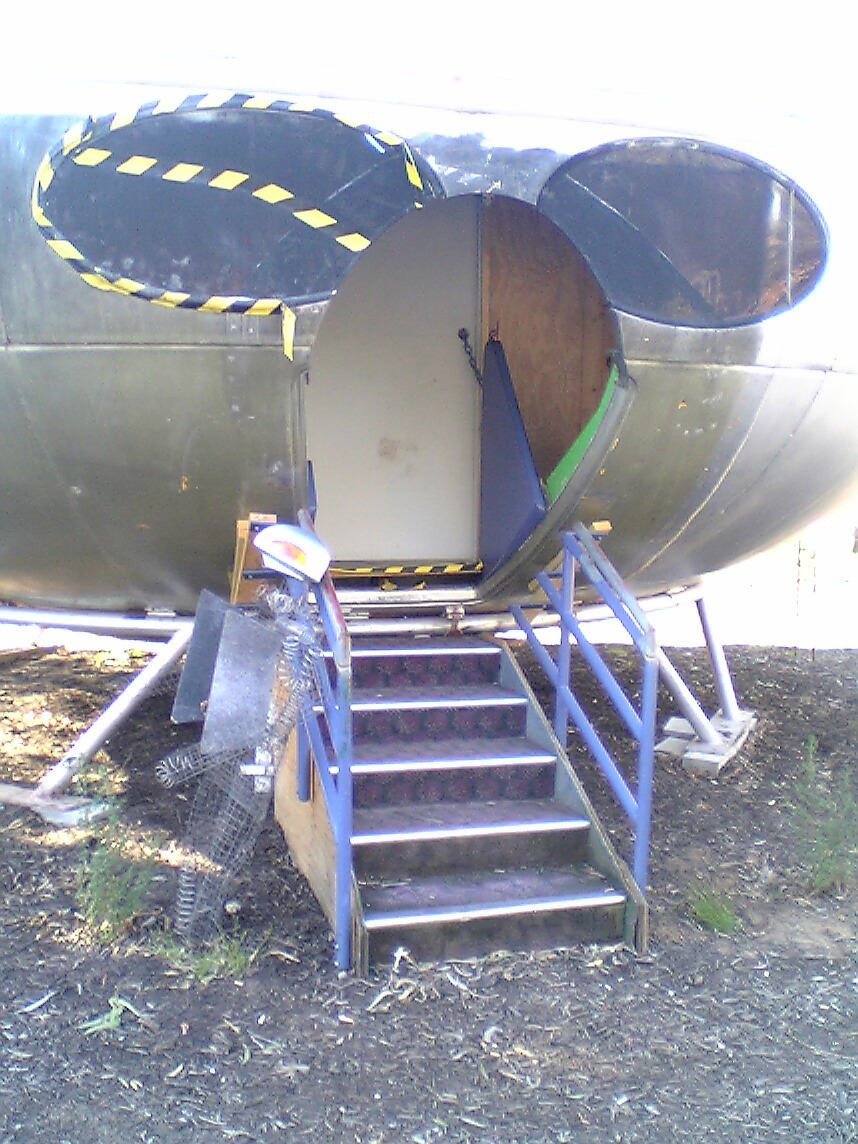
Doorway of a Futuro at the University of Canberra, undergoing conservation

In 2010, Finnish conservator Anna-Maija Kuitunen made a damage assessment plan for the first Futuro ever made (serial number 001). This was done as her final thesis for the Metropolia University of Applied Sciences in Finland ("Futuro no. 001 – documentation and evaluation of preservation need"). The thesis is openly available via the Finnish Theses database and contains a large number of indoor detail photographs and drawings of the Futuro.

A British artist, Craig Barnes, purchased and restored a Futuro in 2013–2014. He had discovered the wreck whilst on holiday in South Africa and had it shipped to the UK before commencing restoration. The Futuro, the only one in the UK, was on display to the public as part of an exhibition on the rooftop of Matt's Gallery, London, until December 2014. The house was featured in the fourth series of the Channel 4 programme George Clarke's Amazing Spaces (ep. 2).

In 2016, the Swedish Air Force Museum obtained a Futuro and set about restoring it for public display.

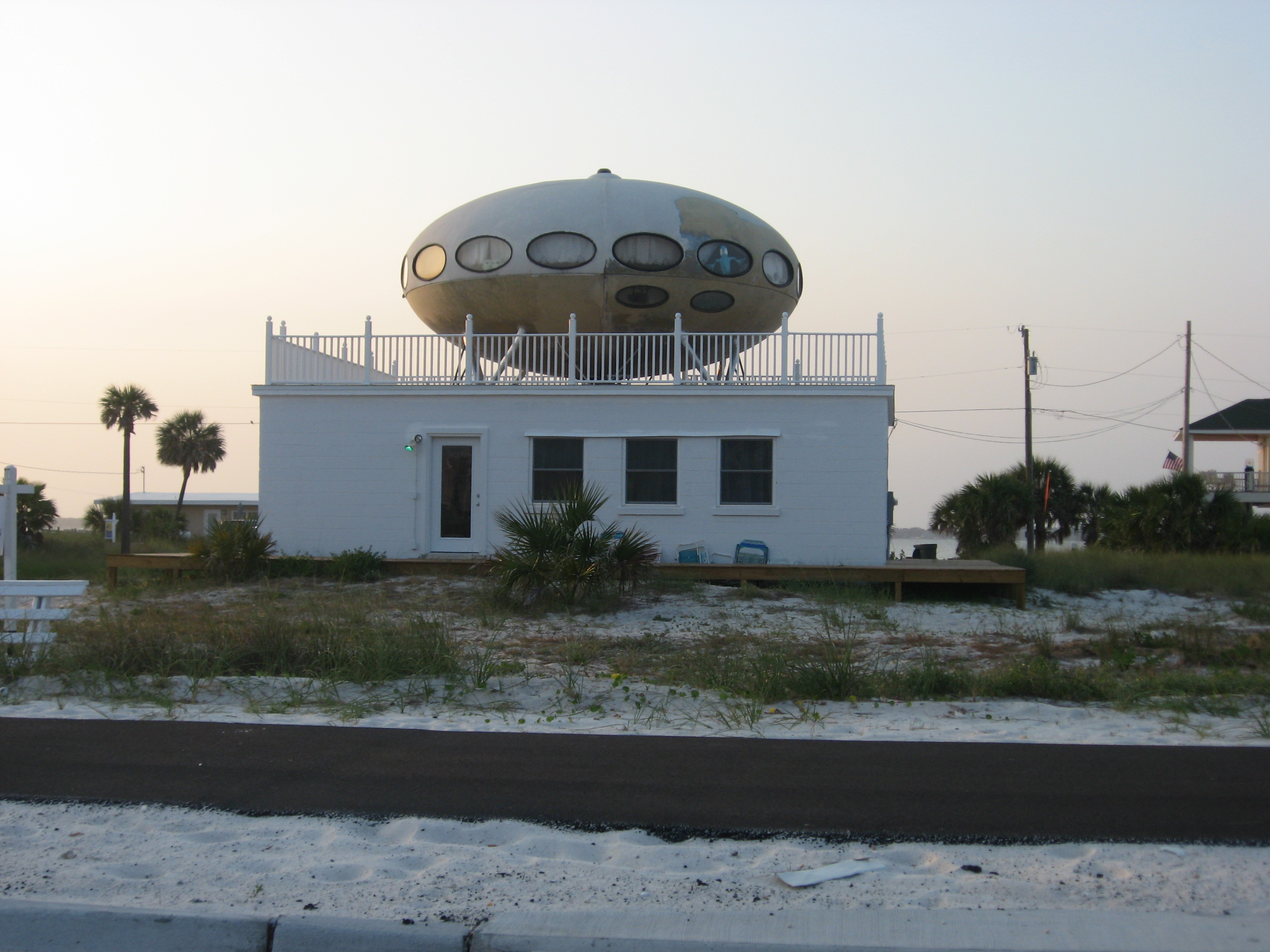
Futuro in Pensacola Beach, Florida, US

== Marketing and media ==
The Futuro was primarily marketed towards young adults as an avant-garde retreat. Its promotion emphasized the versatility of the home in different locations, and an excerpt from a Playboy magazine advertisement reads, "The FUTURO's steel-legged base is adaptable to virtually any terrain, from flatground to a 20 degree incline ... Ideal for Beach, Skiing, Mountain areas and commercial uses." However, a key limitation to this narrative was the need for electricity and plumbing to be installed in order for the structure to be fully habitable. Many surviving structures have been retrofitted to allow for these needs, and as a result, the form Suuronen intended is compromised.

== Uses ==
The Futuro has had many departures from its intended use as a ski chalet.

=== Australia ===
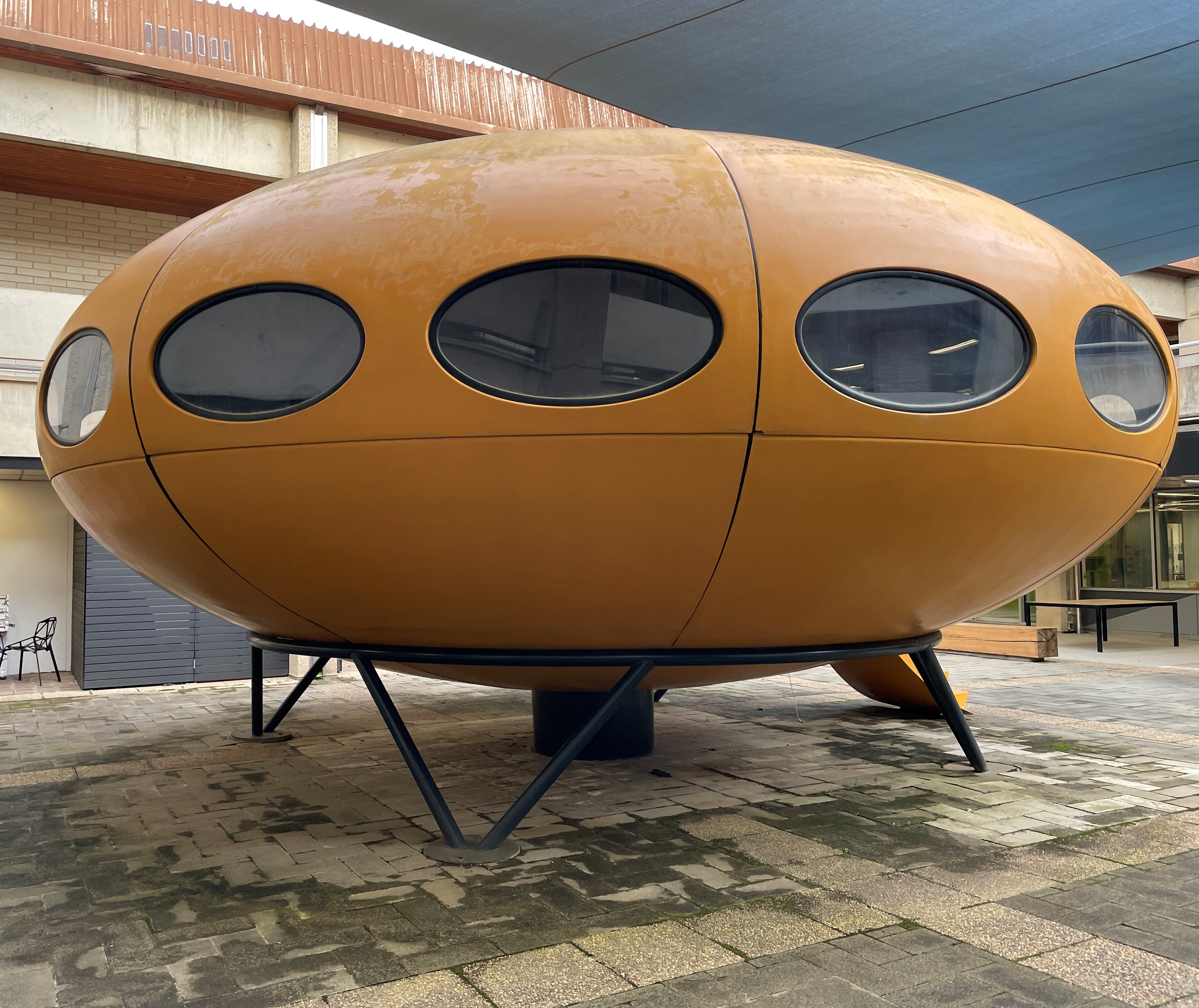
Futuro restored in 2014, in the courtyard of the University of Canberra

Several Futuros are located in Deep Creek, South Australia, and on the campus grounds of the University of Canberra. This Futuro, thought to have been manufactured in New Zealand, arrived in Canberra in 1972. It spent time at the Canberra Space Dome & Observatory in Dickson in 1997 and arrived at the university in 2011.

One Futuro, formerly located in the Perth suburb of Willetton in Western Australia, was used as a residential sales office and became a notable landmark, before being removed in 1996 and disassembled. Another one, previously used as a green room and creative space in Melbourne, was acquired by the CEO of Artrage, restored, and listed for sale in 2025.

A Futuro was used as a private residence in Darwin, Northern Territory, by architect Peter Dermoudy, before its destruction in 1974 during Cyclone Tracey.

=== New Zealand ===
Two Futuros were transported to Christchurch for the 1974 New Zealand British Commonwealth Games. These structures, referred to as "Space Banks", were used by the Bank of New Zealand as temporary banking structures. Following the games, the Futuros were put up for sale.

=== United States ===
Futuros in the US were manufactured by the Futuro Corporation of Philadelphia.

At least nine standard Futuros and one with eight windows were constructed in New Jersey from the 1970s to the 1980s. However, many did not last past the 1980s and were demolished. These pods were installed mostly in shopping-center parking lots. At least one of each model served as small-scale bank branches.

A 1968 Futuro is located in Tampa, Florida, on the roof of the 2001 Space Odyssey strip club.

A Futuro located in Frisco, North Carolina, and featuring alien memorabilia, was a roadside attraction on the Outer Banks for many years, though it had fallen into disrepair, before being completely destroyed by fire on 19 October 2022.

A silver Futuro is on display at the Pink Elephant Antique Mall in Livingston, Illinois, and is often decorated with alien memorabilia.

=== Taiwan ===
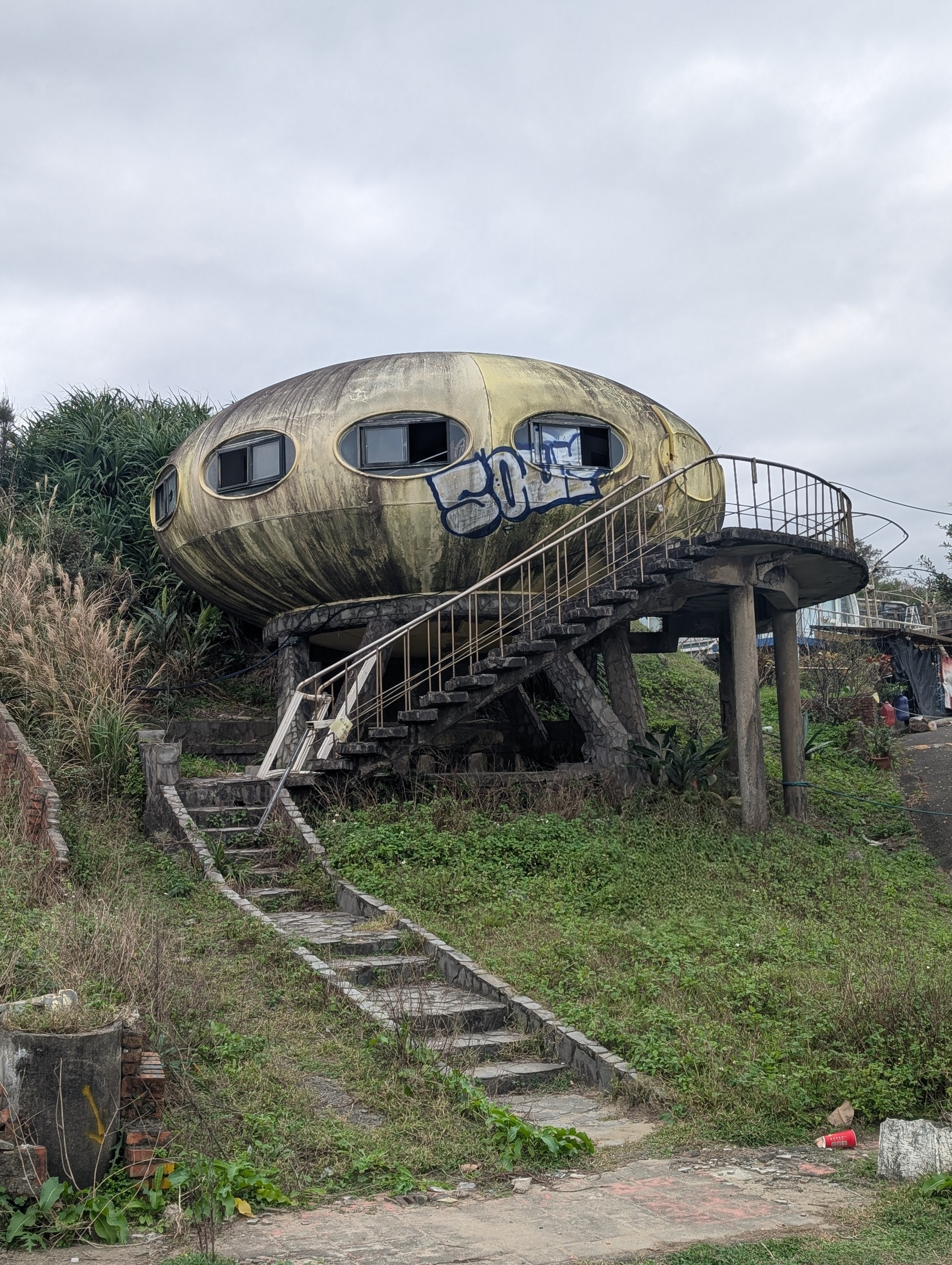
Abandoned Futuro for sale in Wanli, New Taipei, Taiwan

Futuros and Venturos were used to build a holiday park in Wanli District, New Taipei, Taiwan. The park now sits abandoned, with a few houses still occupied but most in disrepair.

== Documentary ==
In 1969, the Australian Broadcasting Corporation shot a piece on the first Futuro kit shipped to Australia.

In 1998, Finnish film director Mika Taanila made a short documentary film about the structures, titled Futuro – A New Stance for Tomorrow.

== See also ==
- Dymaxion house
- Sanzhi UFO houses
- Spaceship House
