= Venturo =

Prefabricated house designed by Matti Suuronen

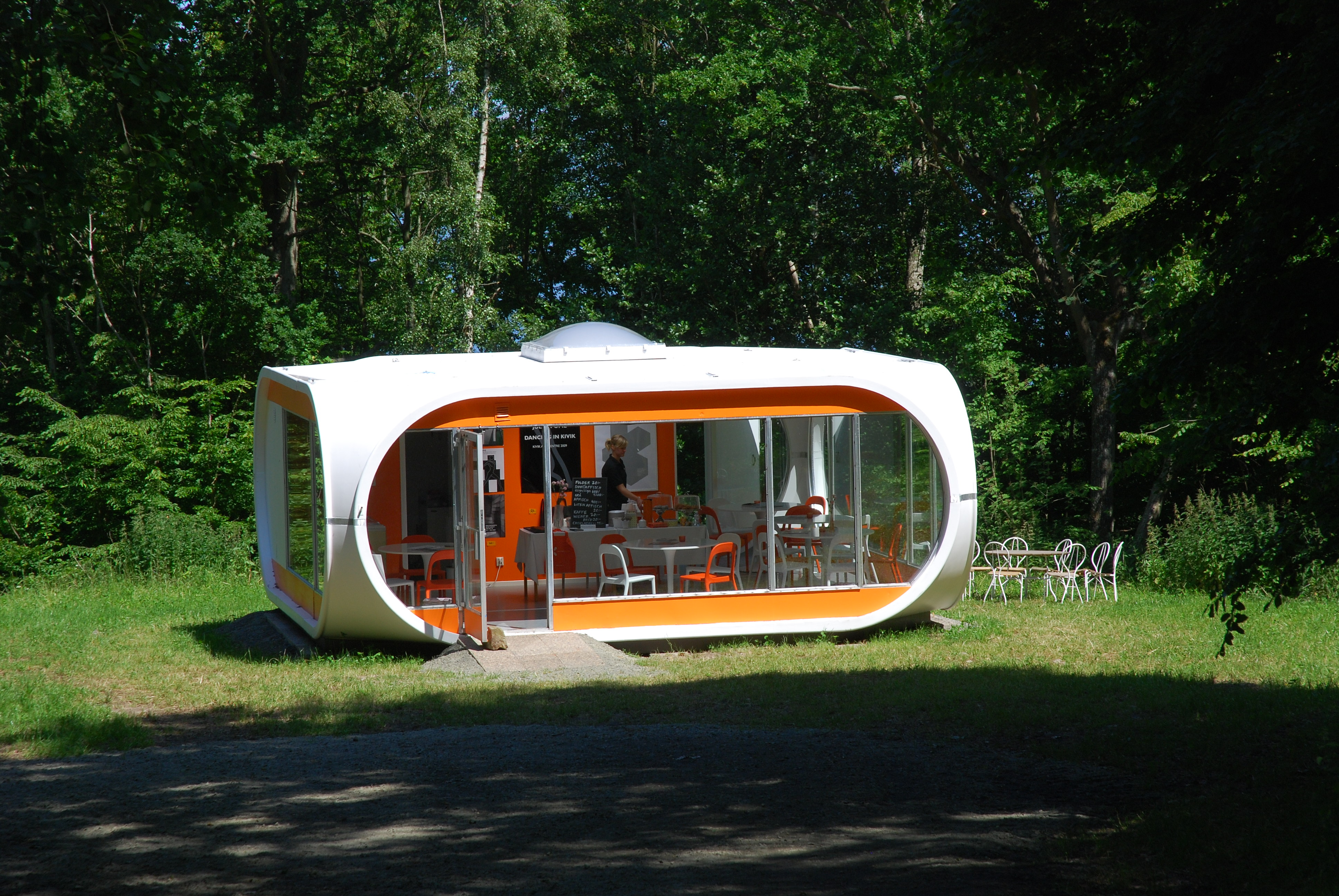
Venturo House in Kivik Art Center, Sweden

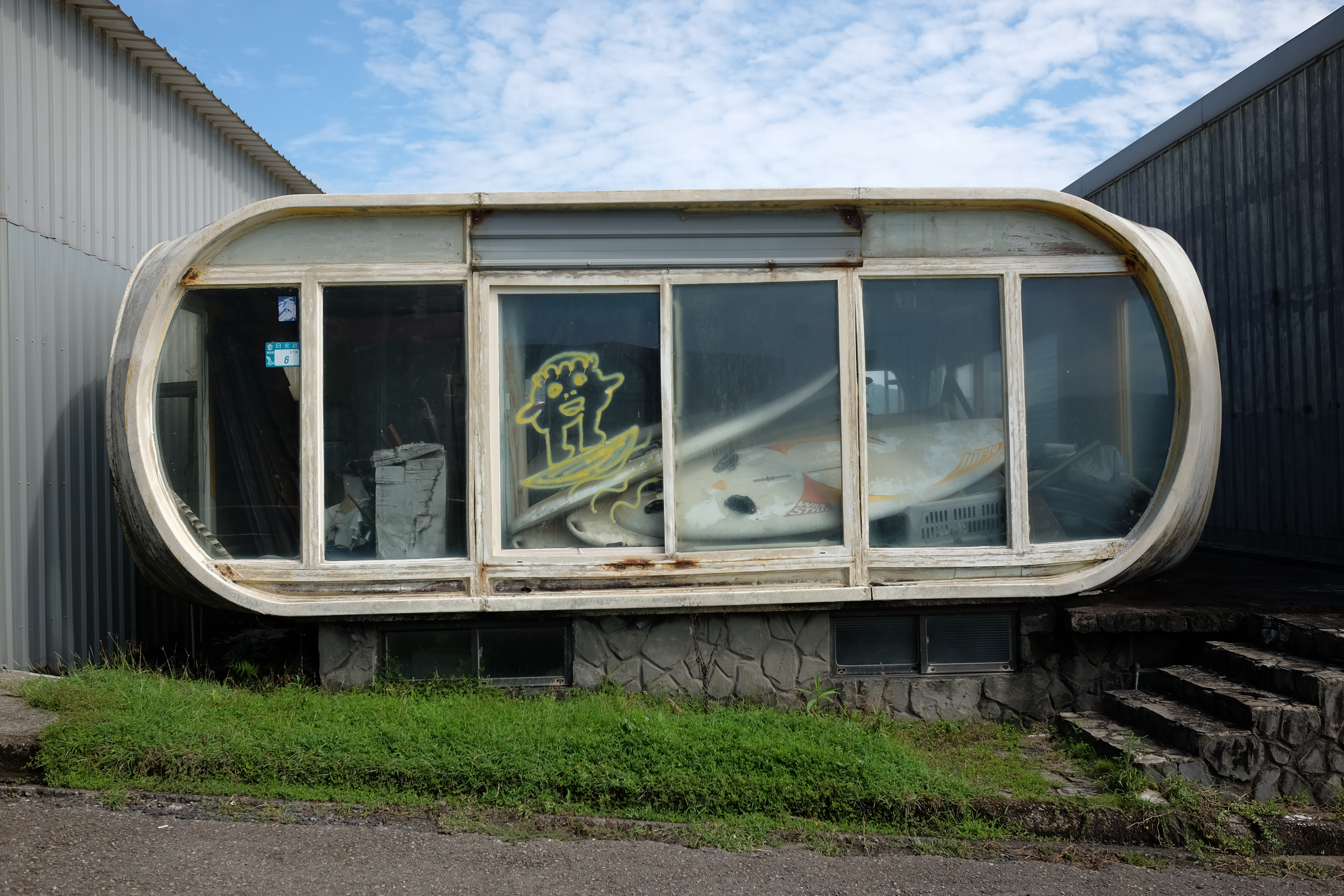
Abandoned Venturo House in Wanli, Taiwan.

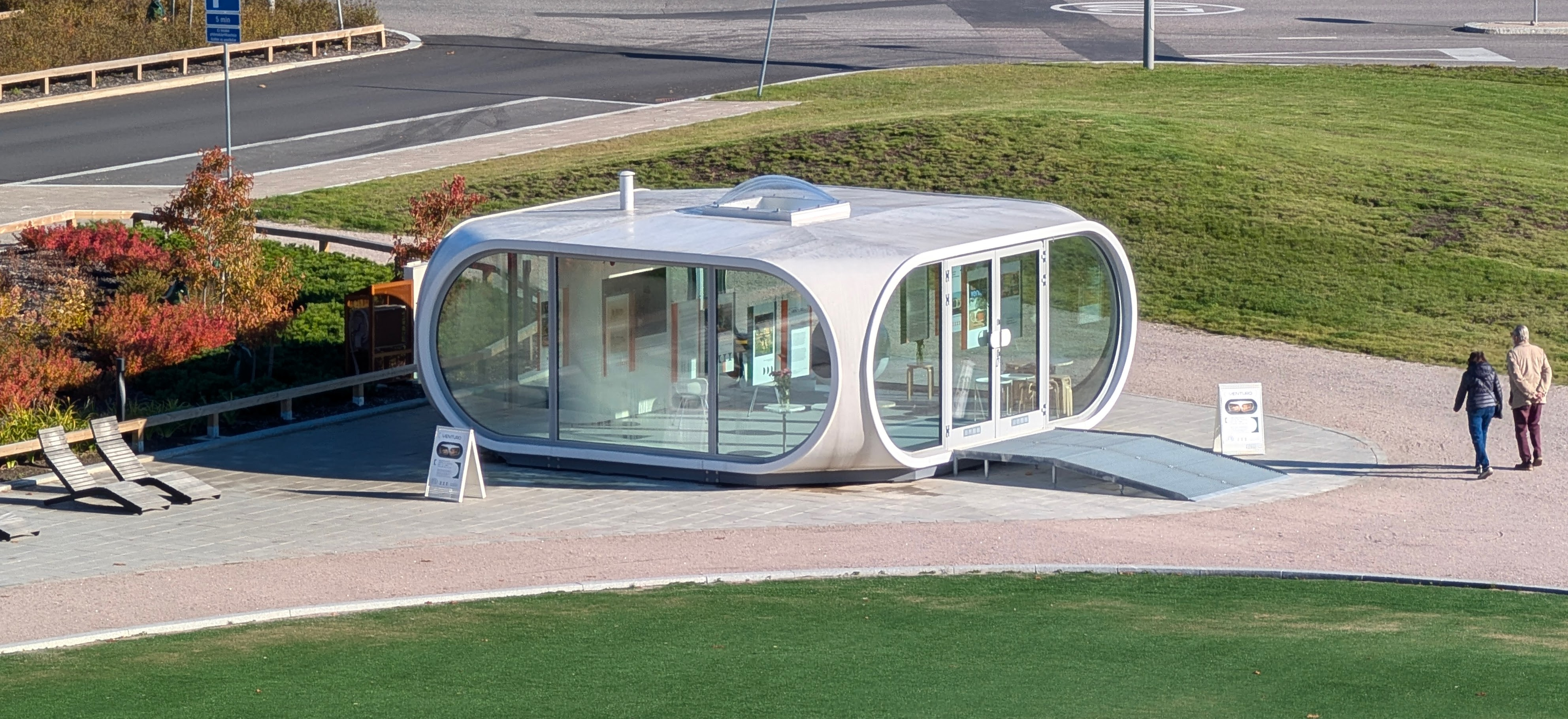
Venturo House at Tapiola, Espoo, Finland, 2024.

Venturo or Venturo House is a prefabricated house designed by Finnish architect Matti Suuronen in 1971. It is composed of fiberglass-reinforced polyester plastic, polyester-polyurethane, and acrylic glass. In the late 1960s Suuronen became known for his round-shaped Futuro House and now wanted to create a new "weekend cottage". Venturo House was a part of Suuronen's Casa Finlandia series, known as the model CF-45. Other models were CF-100/200 (1969) and CF-10 (1970), number indicating the floor area in square meters.

Venturo House is a modular, insulated and transportable building system. The walls and top are made of double-layer fiberglass with two inches thick polyurethane foam and the floor is made of plywood. The floor area is 45 m² and the house weighs four tons. It was shipped in two modules, one containing the bathroom, kitchen and sauna and the other including the filler pieces.

Venturo was originally thought as a weekend house or bungalow but they were also used as small shops and retail kiosks. Three Venturos were imported to Sweden and used as gas stations for BP. As the 1973 oil crisis hit, only 19 Venturo Houses were manufactured by the Finnish company Oy Polykem Ab. However, the license was sold to 23 companies around the world and some houses were presumably produced in Japan.
