= Signal Mountain Middle High School =

Signal Mountain Middle / High School
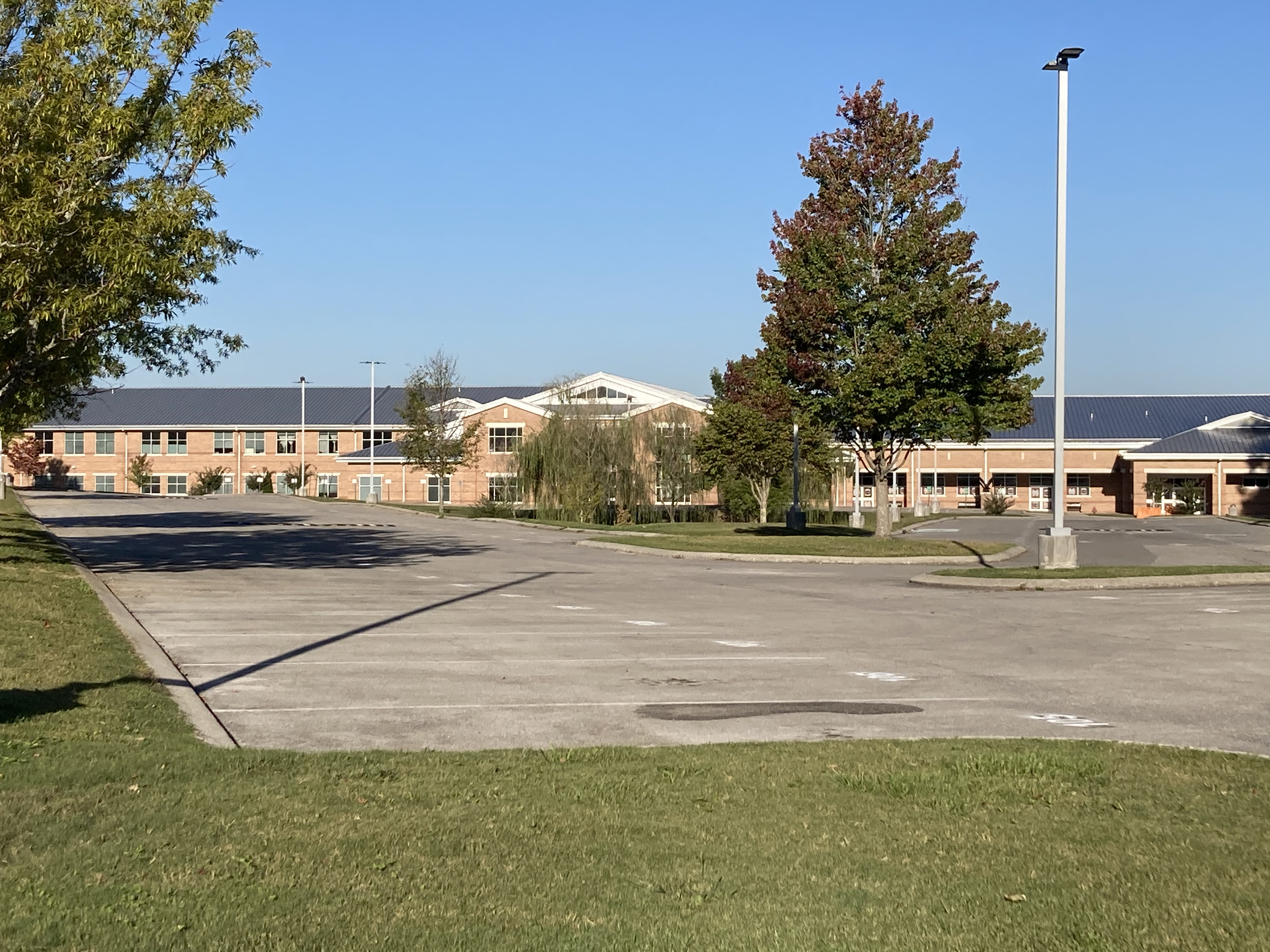

Location
- 2650 Sam Powell Trail; Signal Mountain, Hamilton County, Tennessee 37377; United States; 35.1618°N 85.3684°W

Information
- Type: Public
- Established: 2008
- School district: Hamilton County Schools
- Principal: Micheal Carson
- Teaching staff: 81.22 (FTE)
- Grades: 6–12
- Enrollment: 1,383 (2023–2024)
- Student to teacher ratio: 17.03
- Colors: Red and Black
- Athletics conference: TSSAA
- Team name: Eagles
- Accreditation: Southern Association of Colleges and Schools
- Feeder schools: Nolan Elementary; Thrasher Elementary
- Website: smmhs.hcde.org

Signal Mountain Middle High School is a public high school located in Signal Mountain, Tennessee, United States. The school serves the central west section of Hamilton County for students in grades 6-12.

The school is accredited by the Southern Association of Colleges and Schools.

== History ==
The school was opened in 2008. Desire for a high school located in Signal Mountain had been present for nearly 50 years, though efforts to actually establish the school did not begin until about 10 years prior. Eddie Gravitte was the school's first principal. In August 2009, Gravitte was removed as principal by HCDE administration and replaced by Dr. Tom McCullough.

SMMHS became an International Baccalaureate Middle Years Programme school as of 2010 and added the IB Diploma Programme in 2011.

In May 2012, Dr. McCullough announced his plans to retire at the end of the school year, and Robin Copp was announced as his replacement. However, McCullough was soon suspended without pay by the HCDE superintendent over breaches in HCDE policy compliance. The suspension was quickly lifted. Robin Copp became principal beginning in the fall of 2012 and left to take over as principal of Ooltewah High School following the end of the 2015-2016 school year.

Todd Stinson took office beginning in 2016 (and has been transferred to Lookout Valley Middle/High in 2018). Near the end of 2016, some members of the Signal Mountain community began pushing for the town to form its own school district, separate from Hamilton County, that would include SMMHS and its two feeder elementary schools, Nolan Elementary and Thrasher Elementary. The proposal caused some disagreement among Signal Mountain residents. By early 2018, a consensus on the possibility of breaking away had not been met, though a town council committee formed to investigate the viability of the move was disbanded, effectively ending the debate. In May 2018, Dr. Shane Harwood, formerly the principal of the nearby feeder school Nolan Elementary, was announced as the new principal beginning in the fall of 2018. Harwood retired following the 2022-2023 school year and was replaced by Michael Carson, a former Vice Principal at SMMHS.

Currently, around 1300 students are enrolled. As of the 2014-2015 school year, the student population is 93% Caucasian, 3% African American, and 4% Other.

== Academics and testing ==
During the 2017-2018 school year, 38 senior students (roughly 25% of the graduating class) scored a 30 or above on the ACT, including two scores of 36.

== Fine Arts ==
Signal Mountain Middle / High School offers five different fine arts for middle and high school students to pursue. They are: band, art, theatre, chorus and strings. From middle school through sophomore year of high school, all students are required to take one fine art. There are middle school concert bands separated by grade level, a high school concert band, middle and high school strings, chorus and theatre classes, as well as different levels of art classes.

The Signal Corps Marching Band won the Division II State Championship on November 6, 2021.

The band also went on to place 4th in the Bands of America Grand Nationals Competition Class A in 2021.

== Extracurricular activities ==
Signal Mountain has participated in academic competitions, including Youth in Government, Model United Nations, Technology Student Association, and in mock trial. The school also is involved in a program called Youth Court that partners with Hamilton County Juvenile Court.

== Athletics ==
=== TSSAA-sanctioned sports ===
The below TSSAA-sanctioned teams have won a combined 50 state championships. Years indicate team state championships.

- Baseball
- Boys' basketball
- Girls' basketball
- Boys' bowling
- Girls' bowling
- Boys' cross country: 2019, 2020, 2022, 2023
- Girls' cross country: 2013, 2014, 2015, 2017, 2018, 2019, 2020, 2022, 2023, 2024, 2025, 2026
- Football: 2010
- Girls' flag football
- Boys' golf: 2018, 2019, 2020, 2025, 2026
- Girls' golf: 2009, 2010, 2011, 2012, 2014, 2017
- Boys' lacrosse
- Girls' lacrosse
- Boys' soccer
- Girls' soccer: 2018, 2019, 2020
- Softball
- Boys' tennis
- Girls' tennis: 2018
- Boys' track: 2018, 2021, 2022, 2023, 2024
- Girls' track: 2013, 2014, 2015, 2016, 2017, 2019, 2021, 2022, 2024, 2025
- Girls' Volleyball: 2010, 2023
- Wrestling: 2022
