= Paul V. Nolan =

American politician (1923–2009)

Member of the Tennessee House of Representatives from the Hamilton County district
- In office 1969–1970

Personal details
- Born: November 5, 1923 Bladenboro, North Carolina, U.S.
- Died: June 25, 2009 (aged 85) Signal Mountain, Tennessee
- Party: Republican
- Spouse: Anne Nolan
- Children: 3
- Education: Mars Hill Junior College, The University of North Carolina at Chapel Hill, University of Maryland, UC Berkeley School of Public Health
- Occupation: Doctor, County Commissioner

Paul V. Nolan (November 5, 1923 – June 25, 2009) was an American physician, veteran, statesman, Hamilton County Commissioner, and one term in the Tennessee Legislature. He was married to Anne Nolan. Nolan Elementary School in Signal Mountain, Tennessee was named after him.

== Early life ==
Nolan was born in Bladenboro, North Carolina. He graduated from Mars Hill Junior College and the two-year medical program at The University of North Carolina at Chapel Hill. He graduated from medical school at the University of Maryland. While in the military, he received a Master's in Public Health from the UC Berkeley School of Public Health.

== Military service ==
During WWII, he served in the U.S. Navy at Camp LeJeune, N.C., and then served as a flight surgeon in the U.S. Air Force during the Korean War. After Berkeley, he served as a Preventive Medicine Officer in the Tactical Air Command at Langley Field in Virginia.

== Later career ==
He moved to Signal Mountain in 1959 when he accepted the position of medical director for E.I. DuPont of Chattanooga.

Dr. Nolan was a member of the Hamilton County Quarterly Court from 1966 until 1978, and served as a state representative to the 86th Tennessee General Assembly from 1969 to 1970, representing the sixth district. His political party affiliation was Republican. He served four terms on the County Commission, serving the Signal Mountain/Red Bank area from 1982 until 1998.

He died of liver cancer and was interred at Chattanooga National Cemetery.
