= Signal Mountain, Tennessee =

- Town
- Signal Mountain Town Hall

- Location of Signal Mountain in Hamilton County, Tennessee
- Coordinates: 35°8′N 85°21′W
- Country: United States
- State: Tennessee
- County: Hamilton
- Incorporated: 1919

Area
  - Total: 8.37 sq mi (21.69 km^{2})
  - Land: 8.37 sq mi (21.68 km^{2})
  - Water: 0.0039 sq mi (0.01 km^{2})
- Elevation: 1,703 ft (519 m)

Population (2020)
  - Total: 8,852
  - Density: 1,057.6/sq mi (408.36/km^{2})
- Time zone: UTC−5 (Eastern (EST))
  - Summer (DST): UTC−4 (EDT)
- ZIP Code: 37377
- Area code: 423
- FIPS code: 47-68540
- GNIS feature ID: 1270254
- Website: signalmountaintn.gov

Signal Mountain is a town in Hamilton County, Tennessee, United States. The town is a suburb of Chattanooga and is located on Walden Ridge. "Signal Mountain" is used as a colloquial name for the part of Walden Ridge close to the town. The town population was 8,852 as of the 2020 census and estimated to be 8,567 in 2018.

== Geography ==
Signal Mountain is located in southwestern Hamilton County at 35°8′N 85°21′W (35.1291, -85.3424), atop the south end of Walden Ridge. The southern edge of the town overlooks the Tennessee River 1,000 feet (300 m) below. The town is bordered to the south by the city of Chattanooga, to the northeast by the town of Walden, and to the north by the unincorporated community of Fairmount.

U.S. Route 127 (Ridgeway Avenue) is the main road through the town, leading south off the mountain 8 miles (13 km) to downtown Chattanooga and north over Walden Ridge 21 miles (34 km) to Dunlap.

According to the United States Census Bureau, the town has a total area of 7.7 square miles (19.9 km^{2}), all land.

== History ==
Signal Mountain's history dates back years before settlement of the mountain itself. Centuries prior to the Civil War, Native Americans used a location on the mountain known as Signal Point to send fire and smoke signals across the Tennessee Valley. Later, the Union Army used Signal Point as a communications station during the Civil War. At the outbreak of the war, only a few families lived on the mountain. However, when various health epidemics struck Chattanooga in 1873 and 1878, several wealthy families relocated to the mountain where they could find clear air and pure water. In the early 20th century, Charles E. James purchased 4,400 acres (18 km^{2}) of land in the Signal Point area and developed the mountain. In 1913, construction was completed of twelve miles (19 km) of streetcar track, which linked Chattanooga to Signal Mountain. While the streetcars are no longer used, the tracks remain in the streets of Signal Mountain's historic district named after Velma. On April 4, 1919, the Tennessee Legislature passed the bill that chartered the Town of Signal Mountain. During the 1970s, the town experienced significant growth. In 2013 Signal Mountain made Bloomberg Businessweeks' list of the best places to raise a family.

== Notable people ==
- Susan Akin, 1986 Miss America
- Zane Birdwell, Grammy Award-winning recording engineer
- Rachel Boston, actress and producer
- Charles H. Coolidge, Medal of Honor recipient, namesake of Coolidge Park and member of 3rd Battalion, 141st Infantry Regiment
- Byron De La Beckwith, convicted murderer of civil rights leader Medgar Evers, moved to Walden, just outside of Signal Mountain, near the end of his life
- Joan Hill Hanks, writer and performer of the Tennessee Bicentennial Rap
- Emma Bell Miles, writer, poet, and artist
- Paul V. Nolan (1923–2009), Tennessee state legislator 1969-1970
- Suzanne Fisher Staples, author of award-winning Shiva's Fire and other books
- Mary Q. Steele and William O. Steele, a married pair of children's authors who separately wrote Newbery Honor-winning books

== Demographics ==
Historical population
Census	Pop.	Note	%±
1920	441		—
1930	966		119.0%
1940	1,308		35.4%
1950	1,786		36.5%
1960	3,413		91.1%
1970	4,839		41.8%
1980	5,818		20.2%
1990	7,034		20.9%
2000	7,429		5.6%
2010	7,554		1.7%
2020	8,852		17.2%
2025 (est.)	8,824	▼	−0.3%

=== 2020 census ===
Signal Mountain racial composition
Race	Number	Percentage
White (non-Hispanic)	8,146	92.02%
Black or African American (non-Hispanic)	50	0.56%
Native American	1	0.01%
Asian	118	1.33%
Pacific Islander	6	0.07%
Other/Mixed	292	3.3%
Hispanic or Latino	239	2.7%

As of the 2020 United States census, there were 8,852 people, 3,096 households, and 2,419 families residing in the town.

=== 2010 census ===
As of the census of 2010, there were 7,554 people, 2,950 households, and 2,175 families residing in the town. The population density was 1,112.6 inhabitants per square mile (429.6/km^{2}). There were 3,168 housing units at an average density of 457.4 per square mile (176.6/km^{2}). The racial makeup of the town was 98.2% White, 0.03% African American, 0.1% Native American, 0.5% Asian, and 0.2% from other races.

There were 2,960 households, of which 33.4% had children under the age of 18 living with them, 65.3% were married couples living together, 6.2% had a female householder with no husband present, and 26.5% were non-families. 25.1% of all households were made up of individuals, and 17.2% had someone living alone who was 65 years of age or older. The average household size was 2.51 and the average family size was 3.01.

The population of Signal Mountain was spread out, with 25.6% under the age of 18, 4.4% from 18 to 24, 22.2% from 25 to 44, 27.1% from 45 to 64 and 20.6% who were 65 years of age or older. The median age was 45.3 years. For every 100 females, there were 87.6 males. For every 100 females age 18 and over, there were 83.3 males.

The median income for a household was $78,900, and the median income for a family was $130,997. Males had a median income of $102,241 versus $54,878 for females. The per capita income for the town was $71,134. About 2.3% of families and 3.4% of the population were below the poverty line, including 3.3% of those under age 18 and 3.0% of those age 65 or over.

== Attractions ==
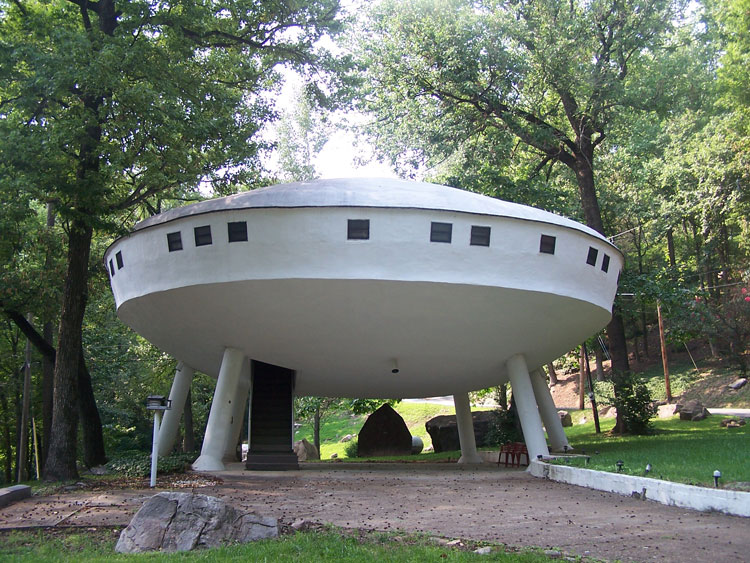
Spaceship House, Signal Mountain, Tennessee

Signal Mountain is home to a number of outdoors attractions, including the Cumberland Trail, Mabbitt Springs, and Signal Point, which is part of Chickamauga and Chattanooga National Military Park. Visitors and citizens have many different locations where they can hike and backpack, such as Rainbow Lake and Edward's Point.

The Signal Mountain Playhouse presents two plays per year including an outdoor musical every summer in the natural amphitheatre behind the Town Hall. The MACC (Mountain Arts Community Center), located in the historic Signal Mountain Elementary School building, offers classes in music, dance, and visual arts. The neighboring town of Walden hosts an outdoor public playground and pavilion called the Pumpkin Patch that is open for all to enjoy. Also, Bachman Community Center has many annual events as well as a small library and community garden plots. The New Mountain Opry hosts a weekly bluegrass music show every Friday evening.

Just south of Signal Mountain's town line on Route 127 is the 1973 Spaceship House, a futuristic residence designed to look like a flying saucer.

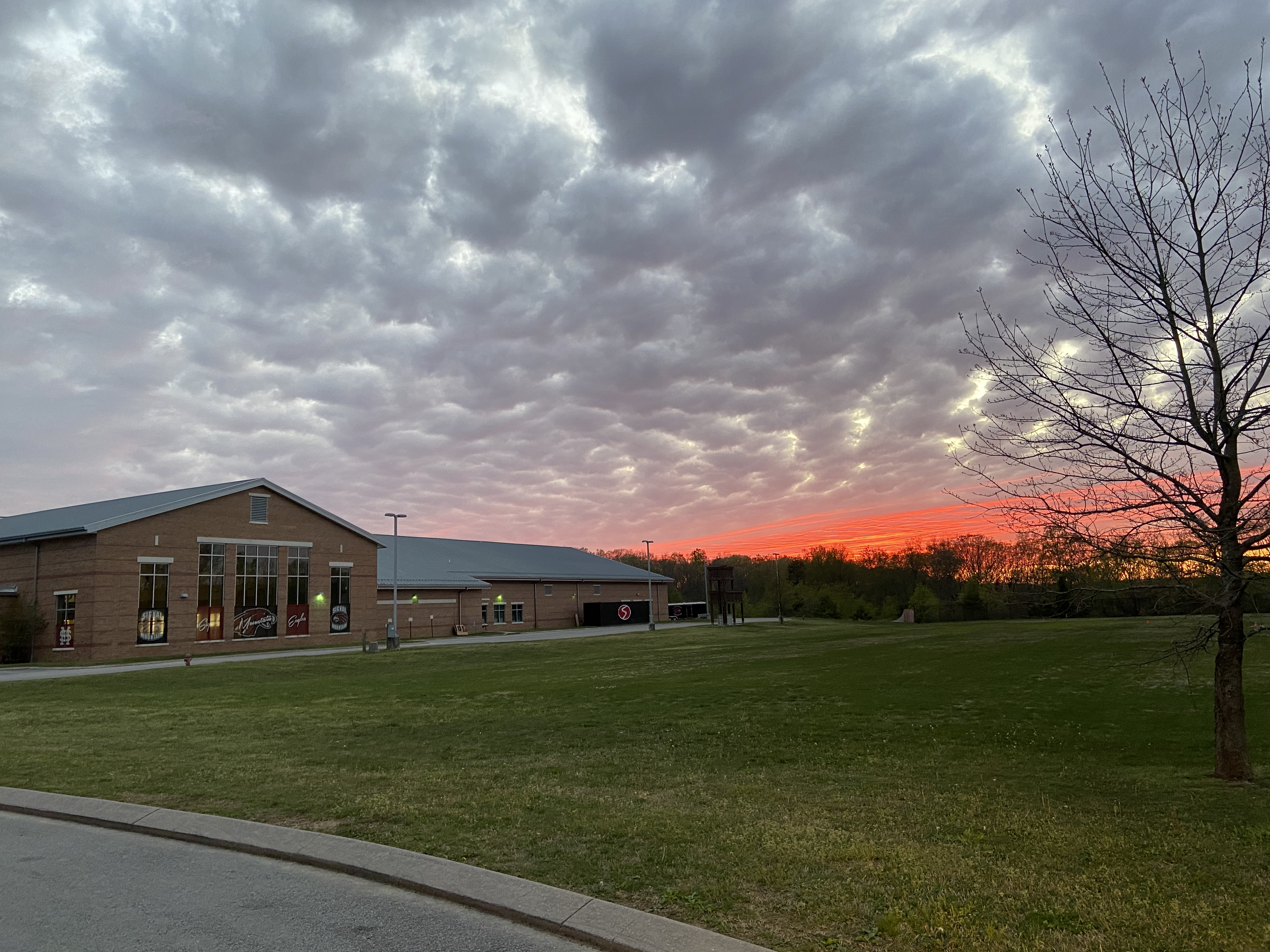
Signal Mountain Middle/High School

== Schools ==
- Elementary schools:
  - Nolan Elementary (named after Dr. Paul V. Nolan)
  - Thrasher Elementary (named after Wilkes T. Thrasher)
  - Signal Mountain Christian School
- Middle School: Signal Mountain Middle/High School
- High School: Signal Mountain Middle/High School
