= Jetsons house (Tulsa) =

Building in Tulsa, Oklahoma

Coordinates: 36°09′36″N 96°03′54″W

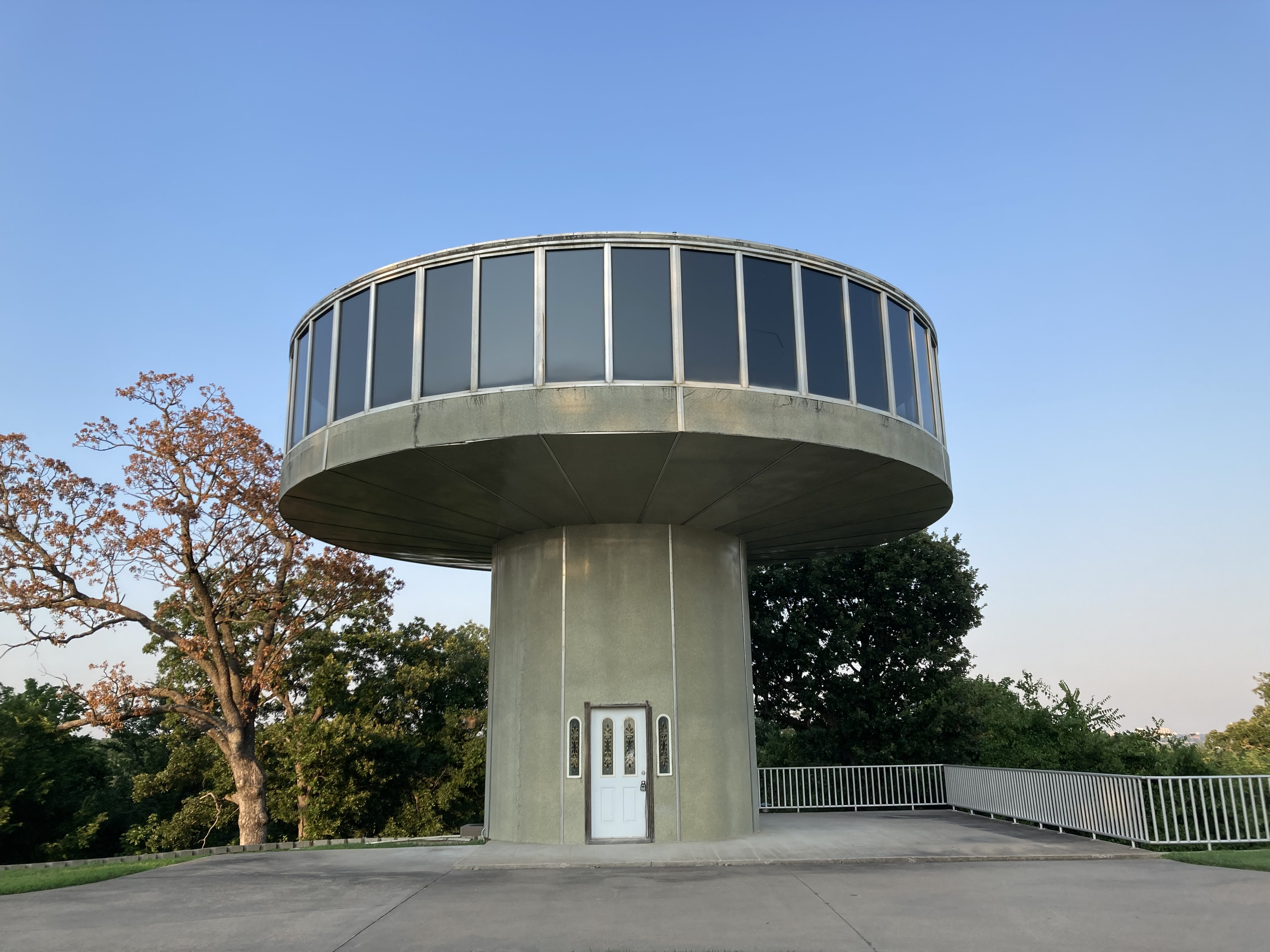
- The Jetsons House in 2024

General information
- Location: 415 N 65th West Ave, Tulsa, OK, Tulsa, Oklahoma, United States
- Elevation: 44 ft (13 m)
- Completed: 2005

Technical details
- Floor count: 4
- Floor area: 1,386 sq ft (128 sq m2)
- Lifts/elevators: 1

Design and construction
- Architect: Jeremy Perkins

The Jetsons house is a house in Tulsa, Oklahoma. It was built by Joe Damer, who finished it in 2005.

== History ==
The house was inspired by a postcard from 1965, which featured a house in Arizona that was similar in appearance to the building. The card is currently displayed in the house.

== See also ==
- Spaceship House
