= Matti Suuronen =

Finnish architect (1933–2013)

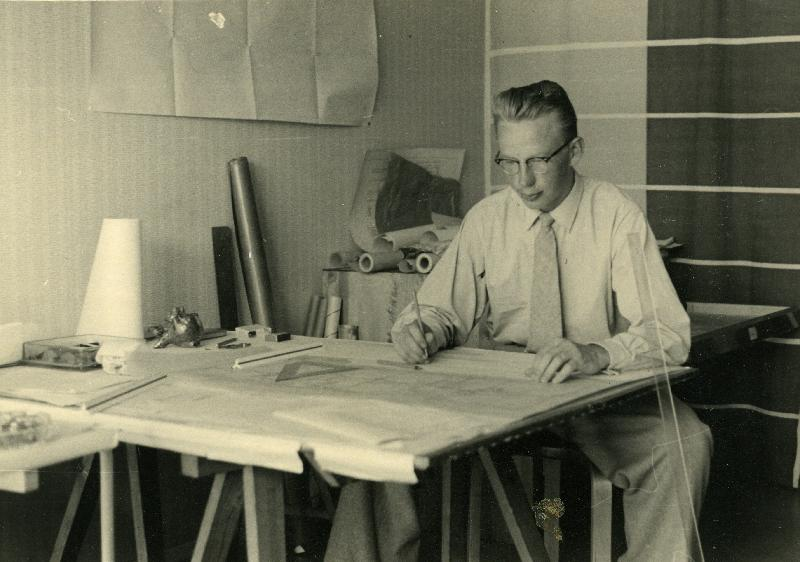
- Born: Matti Johannes Suuronen; 14 June 1933; Lammi, Finland
- Died: 16 April 2013 (aged 79); Espoo, Finland
- Occupation: Architect
- Spouse: Sirkku Suuronen
- Children: 3 children
- Design: Futuro, Venturo

Matti Suuronen (14 June 1933 – 16 April 2013) was a Finnish architect and designer who is best known for designing the Futuro and Venturo homes in the Casa Finlandia series. The marvelous design of the Futuro went into production in both Finland and worldwide under license in various colors, upholstery, and number of seats and rooms. Furthermore, Suuronen is also internationally known for designing buildings (especially the Futuro and Venturo), which made the novel use of materials such as polyester resin, fiberglass, and acrylic windows. Apart from the Futuro and Venturo homes, Suuronen additionally designed several buildings such as apartments, detached and terraced homes, offices, kiosks, petrol stations, and public and industrial buildings. Suuronen's designs have been installed around the world, including such locations as the Centraal Museum in Utrecht.

== Life and career ==
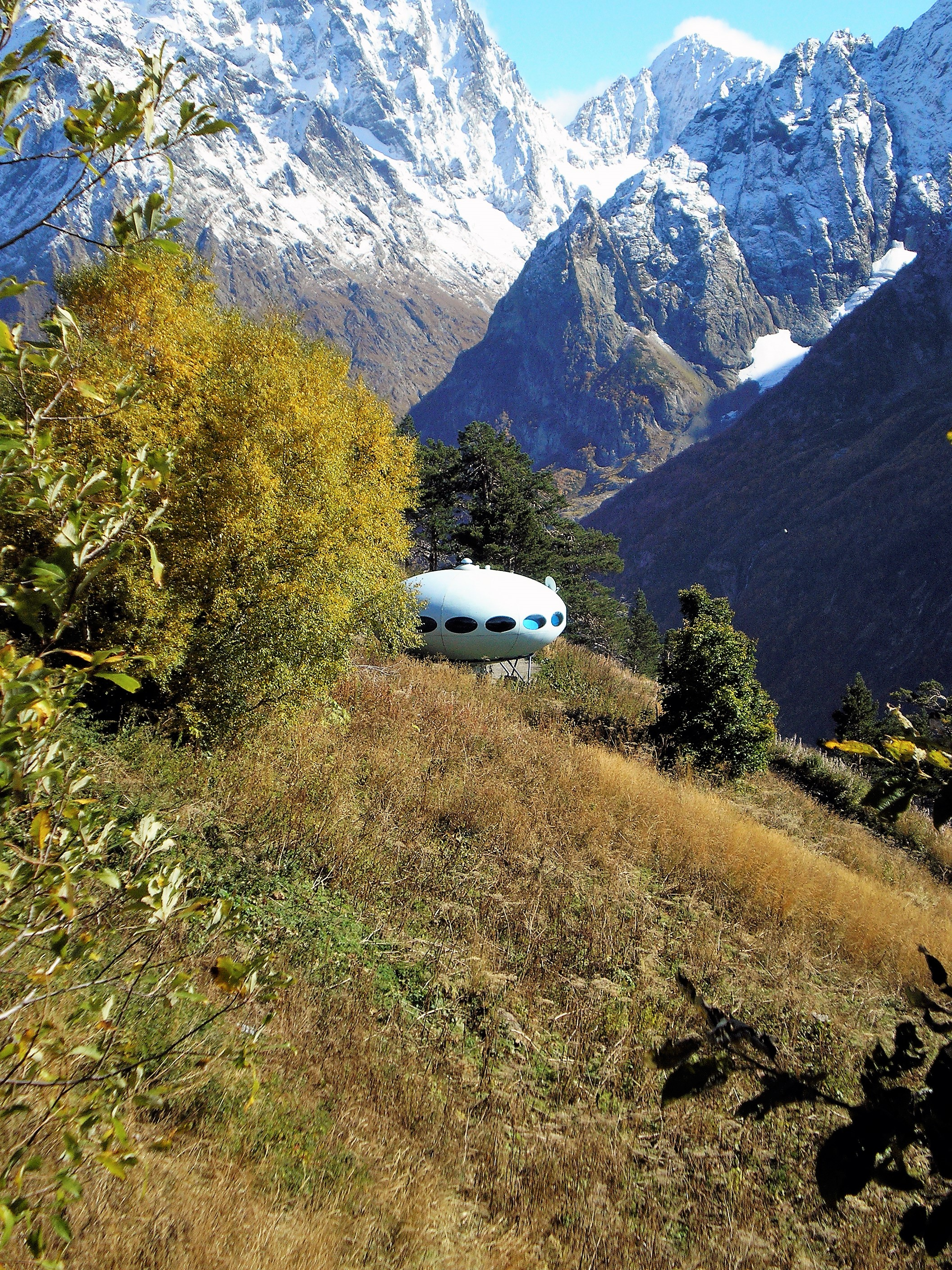
A Futuro home on the slope of Mount Mussa-Achitara in Dombay, Karachay-Cherkess Republic.

Matti Johannes Suuronen was born on 14 June 1933 in Lammi, a former municipality of Finland. During the late 1950s, he participated in a four-day workshop, where he familiarized himself with glass-reinforced polyester plastics. Suuronen became interested in the new raw material, which he later used as designing material in future projects. He worked at several practices between 1955 and 1961 while studying architecture. Suuronen graduated from Helsinki University of Technology in 1961 and established his own architectural firm the same year. He received his first experience of glass-reinforced polyester plastics in 1964, when he got the opportunity to design a cupola of eight meters in diameter to cover a grain silo located in Seinäjoki.

In 1965, Matti Suuronen was asked by his former schoolmate, Dr. Jaakko Hiidenkari, to design a ski cabin that would be “quick to heat and easy to construct in rough terrain.” The project was called the After-Ski cabin. Having already been familiar with the use of fiberglass-reinforced polyester plastic in the past, Suuronen used this material in his project to produce the cabin. In addition, the house would consist of 16 pieces that were to be bolted together to form the floor, roof, and shape of the house. This would allow the project to be assembled on site or even be airlifted in one piece by helicopter on site. The ultimately ellipsoidal building shell was based on the decision for a mathematically determinable shape with optimal volume. The contract for constructing it was ultimately awarded to Polykem Ltd., a company that specializes in the manufacturing of plastic and neon signs, following a competitive offer to whoever would build the cabin. The result was a universally transportable home that had the ability to be mass replicated and situated in almost any environment.

The first ever mass-produced home by Suuronen was Futuro no. 001, which was owned by Finnish actor and screenwriter Matti Kuusla and formerly located in Hirvensalmi, Finland. However, the installation of the house on the wooded shore of Lake Puulavesi caused a local outcry. Nevertheless, the house would make an international breakthrough in October 1968 when the third Futuro (no. 002) was displayed at the Finnfocus 68 fair in London.

Capitalizing on the Futuro's international exposure, Polykem Ltd. soon launched a whole series of plastic buildings designed by Suuronen. The Casa Finlandia series included the CF-100/200 service station (1969), the CF-10 kiosk (1970) and the CF-45 residential/commercial building, better known as Venturo (1971). All buildings in the Case Finlandia series were designed to be durable and convenient to mass-produce, transport, and assembled on site.

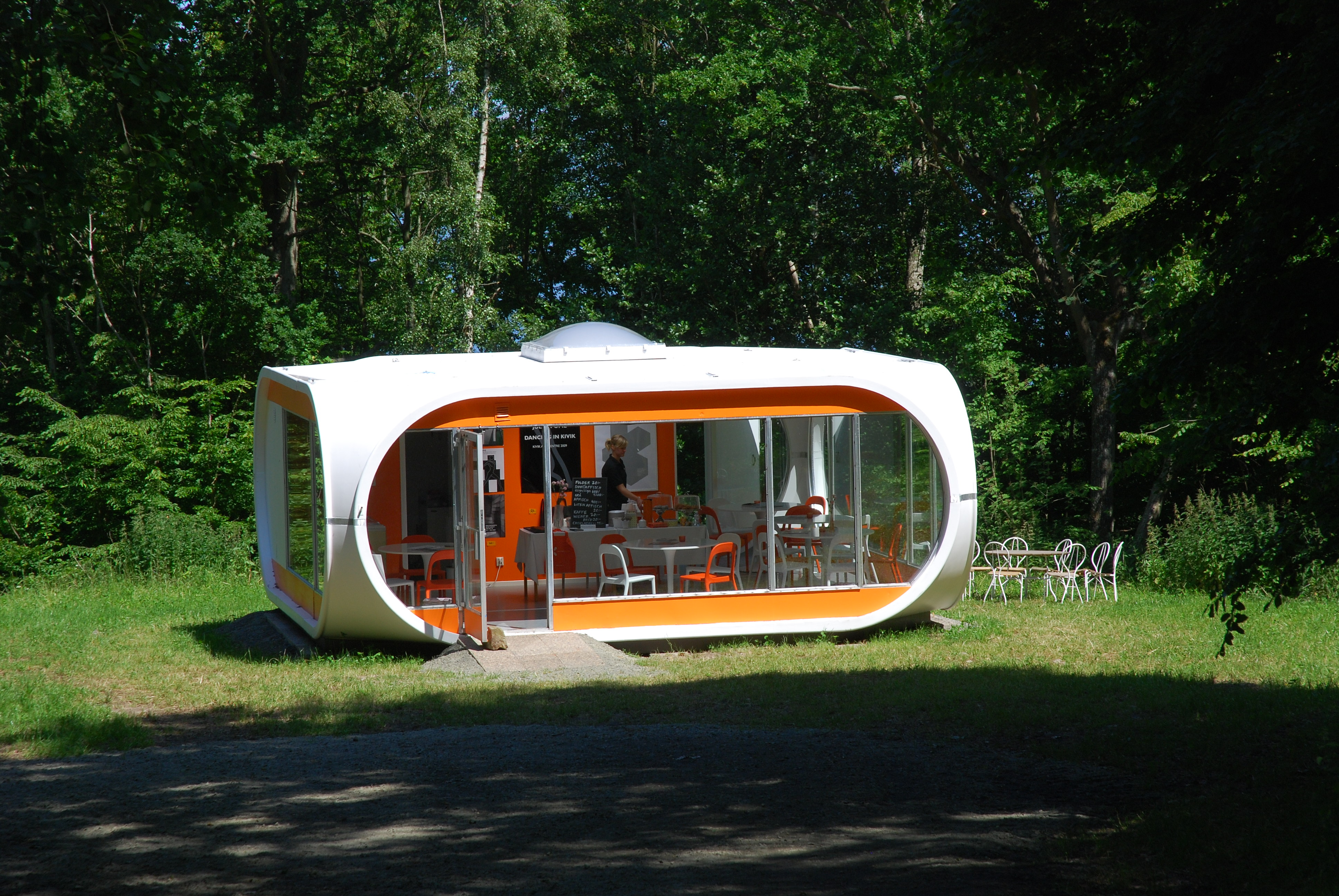
Suuronen's Venturo at the Kivik Art Centre in Kivik, Sweden.

In 1969, Suuronen designed the Gulf service station in Lempäälä, which was made from the same materials used in the Futuro. According to old advertisements, Lempäälä was the first in the filling station series to be completed. Three more Gulf stations were produced and erected in Tampere, Vantaa, and Kemi. The last two stations have double the space that covers an area of 200 square metres (2,200 sq ft). Engineering critics have noted that some of these early works, such as Suuronen's innovative petrol station design in Lempäälä, suffered long-term performance problems due to the material limitations of early composites.

In 1971, Suuronen designed the Venturo, the last fiberglass-reinforced polyester plastic building in the Casa Finlandia series. Originally conceived as a weekend house or bungalow, the Venturo were conveniently used as banks, kiosks, cafés, filling stations, and much more. However, the Casa Finlandia series would be a short-lived success. The 1973 oil crisis resulted in gasoline prices to skyrocket, which caused the manufacturing of plastic to be expensive. Because of this the costs of manufacturing plastic buildings rose prohibitively.

Suuronen continued designing standard buildings through the latter of the 20th century.

== Personal life ==
Throughout his life, Suuronen had been keen on the sport of volleyball and was part of Finland's national league. He married professional pianist, Sirkku, and had three children. He also designed his own home for the family, as well as designing his own architectural studio within the residency. Suuronen spent his final years short of money. In addition, Suuronen had several health issues and didn't have the energy to further pursue designing. Suuronen's daughter, Sari, stated to The Guardian that:

He [Suuronen] was always very optimistic about his health. He played volleyball up until his last operation. He never lost his vivid, creative mind and his lust for creating something more for the world.

Suuronen died from a lengthy illness on 16 April 2013 in Espoo, Finland at age 79. He had cancer, as well as heart and respiratory problems.

== Selected works ==
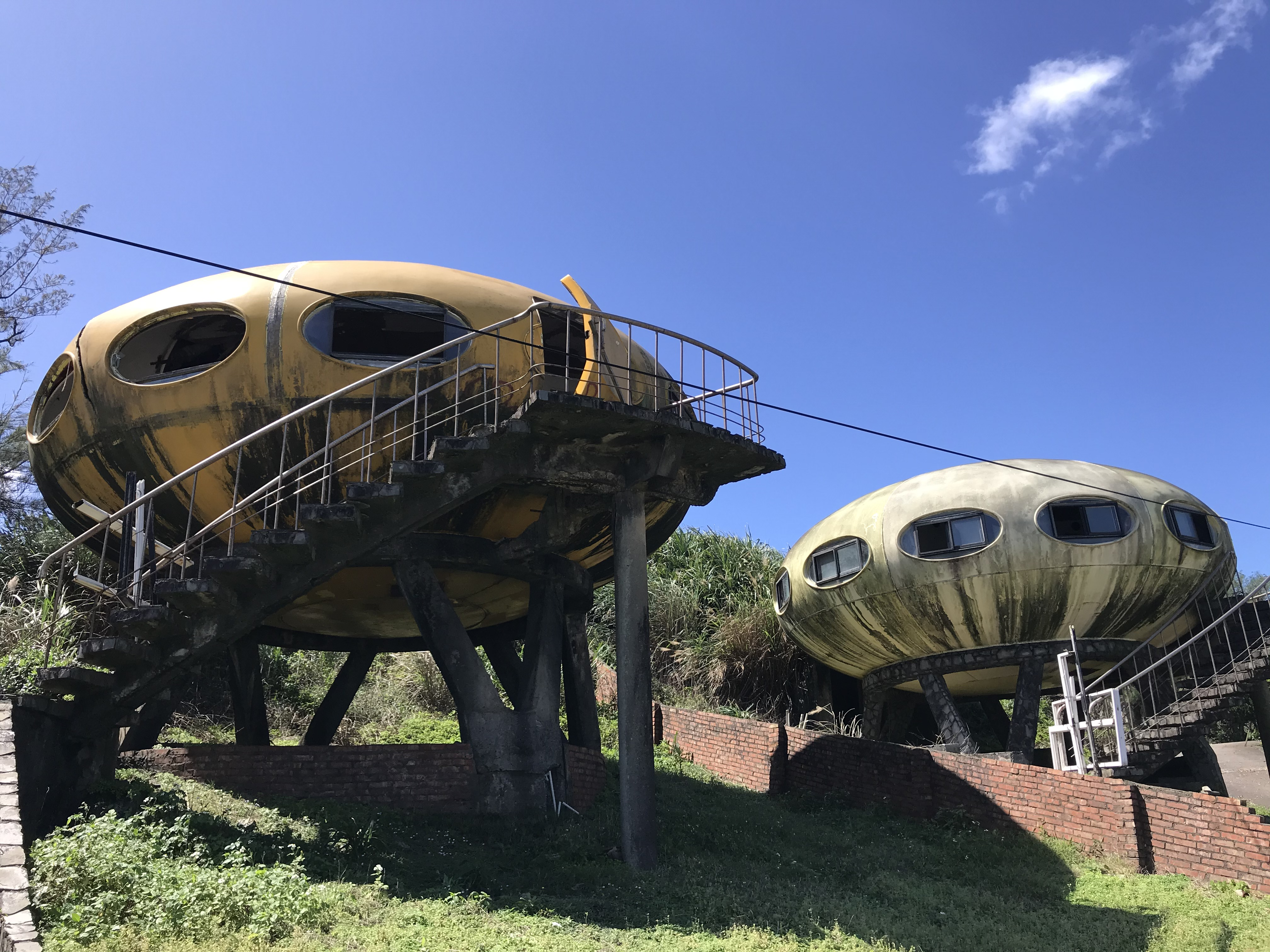
Two Futuro home in Taiwan.

Selected works from Matti Suuronen by E. Vanhakoski.

- 1963, Hankkija Silo and Storage, Seinäjoki, Finland
- 1963, Suuronen's Studio and Residence, Westendintie 43,Espoo, Finland
- 1964, Kauppa-Tammer, Hämeenkatu 5, Tampere, Finland
- 1965, Two-Family House, Marjaniemenranta 24, Helsinki, Finland
- 1965, Sigma Oy Office and Storage, Vantaa, Finland
- 1968, Valmet Oy Instrument Factory, Osuusmyllynkatu 13, Tampere, Finland
- 1969, Gulf Service Station No. 1, Helsingintie 991, Lempäälä, Finland
- 1969, Gulf Service Station No. 2, Tampere, Finland
- 1969, Starckjohann Storage Centre, Lahti, Finland
- 1970, Gulf Service Station No. 3, Vanamontie 13, Vantaa, Finland
- 1970, Gulf Service Station No. 4, (60°18′33.22″N 25°01′41.72″E), Kemi, Finland
- 1971, Apartment Houses, Aulangontie 26–30, Hämeenlinna, Finland
- 1975, Mäntykero Industrial Building, Mäntyharju, Finland
- 1980, Mäntykero-sauna, Mäntyharju, Finland
