= Toni Suuronen =

Finnish ice hockey player

- Born: 30 June 1995 (age 30) Hamina, Finland
- Height: 183 cm (6 ft 0 in)
- Weight: 83 kg (183 lb; 13 st 1 lb)
- Position: Forward
- Shot: Left
- Played for: Lukko; KooKoo
- Playing career: 2014–2024

Toni Suuronen (born 30 June 1995) is a Finnish former ice hockey forward who played for KooKoo of the Finnish Liiga.

== Career statistics ==
			Regular season					Playoffs
Season	Team	League	GP	G	A	Pts	PIM	GP	G	A	Pts	PIM
2014–15	KeuPa HT	Mestis	6	1	1	2	8	—	—	—	—	—
2014–15	Lukko	Liiga	14	0	0	0	0	4	0	0	0	0
2015–16	Lukko	Liiga	48	1	1	2	0	2	0	0	0	0
2015–16	KeuPa HT	Mestis	13	4	4	8	2	7	0	1	1	4
2016–17	Lukko	Liiga	59	5	7	12	40	—	—	—	—	—
2017–18	Lukko	Liiga	56	5	3	8	28	2	1	0	1	0
2018–19	KooKoo	Liiga	58	7	7	14	42	—	—	—	—	—
2019–20	KooKoo	Liiga	53	3	1	4	45	—	—	—	—	—
2020–21	KooKoo	Liiga	44	5	5	10	10	—	—	—	—	—
2021–22	KooKoo	Liiga	15	3	0	3	16	16	3	1	4	14
2022–23	KooKoo	Liiga	31	6	4	10	20	—	—	—	—	—
2023–24	KooKoo	Liiga	9	1	2	3	2	—	—	—	—	—
Liiga totals			387	36	30	66	203	24	4	1	5	14
