= Sanzhi UFO houses =

Abandoned resort buildings in New Taipei, Taiwan

Coordinates: 25.2609591°N 121.4776754°E

Sanzhi UFO Houses
- 三芝飛碟屋
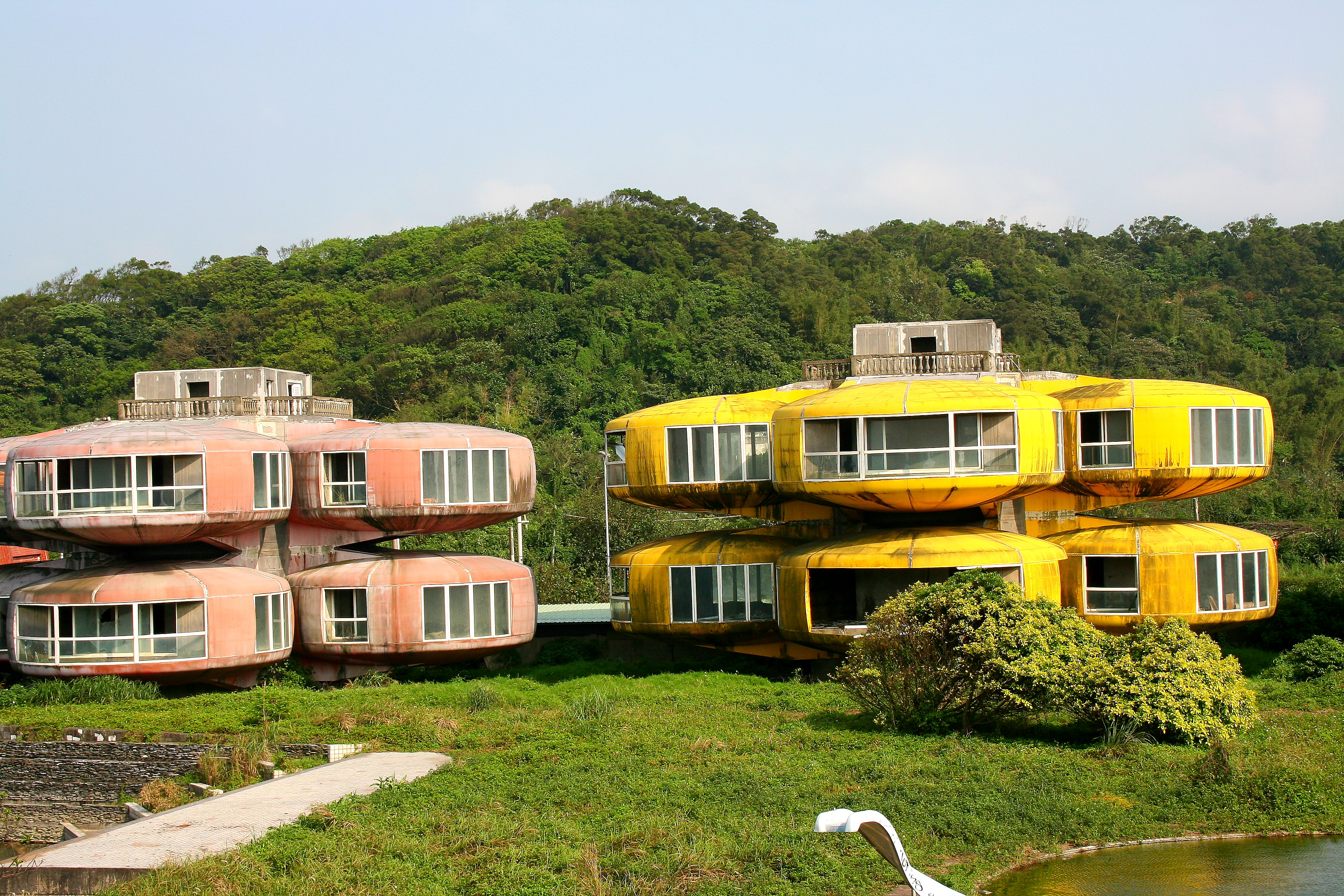
- Interactive map of the Sanzhi UFO Houses area

General information
- Type: Resort
- Architectural style: UFO
- Location: Sanzhi, New Taipei, Taiwan
- Groundbreaking: 1978
- Construction started: 1978
- Construction stopped: 1980
- Demolished: 2010

Technical details
- Floor count: 2

The Sanzhi UFO Houses (Chinese: 三芝飛碟屋; pinyin: Sānzhī Fēidiéwū), also known as the UFO houses of Sanjhih, Sanjhih pod houses or Sanjhih Pod City, were a set of abandoned and never-completed pod-shaped buildings in Sanzhi District, New Taipei, Taiwan. The buildings resembled Futuro houses, some examples of which can be found elsewhere in Taiwan. The site where the buildings were located was owned by Hung Kuo Group.

== Construction and abandonment ==
The UFO houses were constructed beginning in 1978. They were intended as a vacation resort in a part of the northern coast adjacent to Tamsui, and were marketed towards U.S. military officers coming from their East Asian postings. However, the project was abandoned in 1980 due to investment losses as well as several car accident deaths and suicides during construction, which is thought to have been caused by the inauspicious act of bisecting the Chinese dragon sculpture located near the resort gates for widening the road to the buildings. Other stories indicated that the site was the former burial ground for Dutch soldiers.

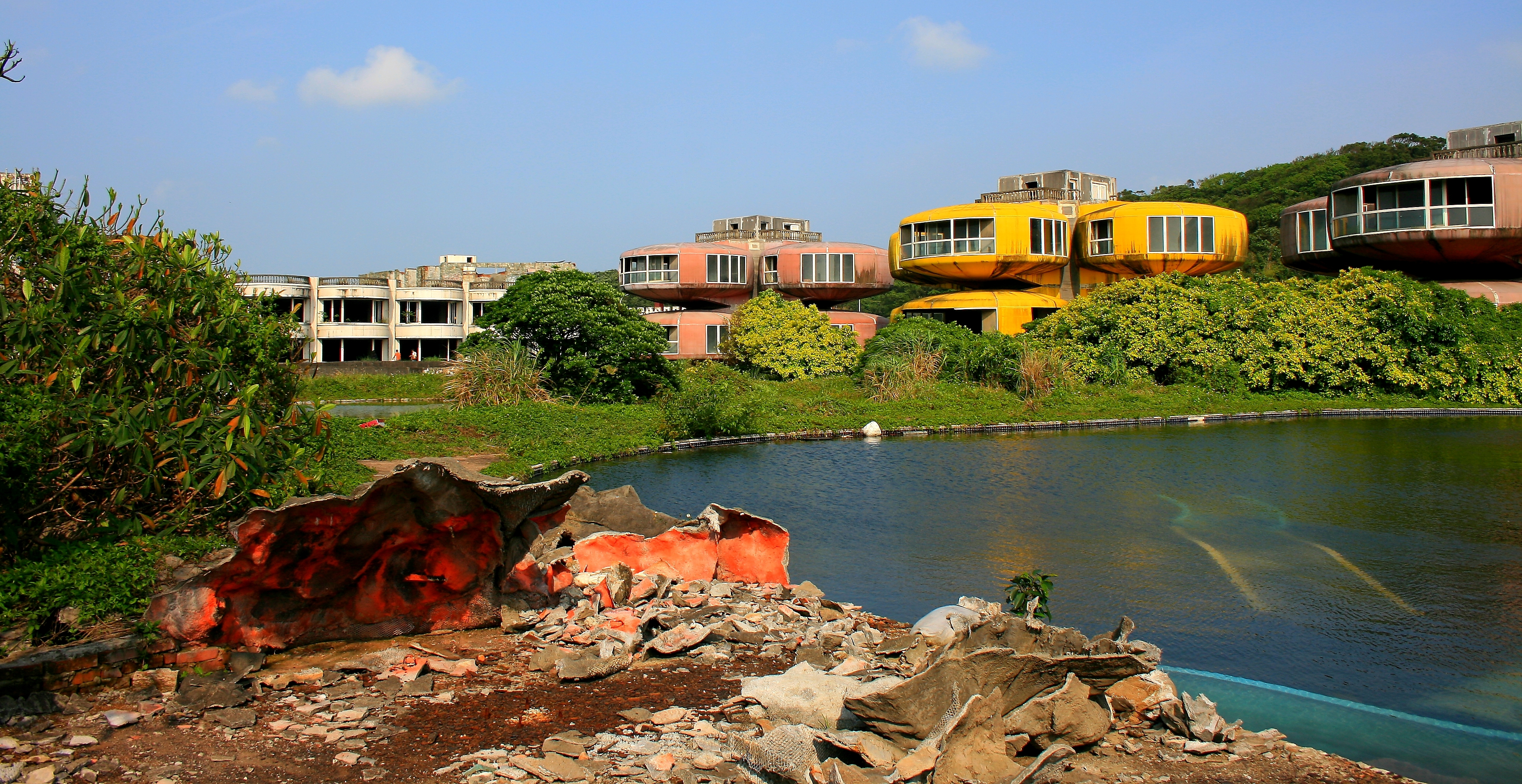
Abandoned Sanzhi UFO houses

The pod-like buildings became a minor tourist attraction due in part to their unusual architecture. The structures became the subject of a film, used as a location by MTV for cinematography, and became a subject in online discussions, described as a ghost town or "ruins of the future".

== Demolition ==
The buildings were scheduled to be torn down in late 2008, despite an online petition to retain at least one of the structures as a museum. Demolition work on the houses began on 29 December 2008, with plans to redevelop the site into a tourist attraction with hotels and beach facilities.

The last of the houses were demolished by 2010, and the site was in the process of being converted to a commercial seaside resort and water park.

== In popular culture ==
The site features in one of the sequences of the 1987 action film White Phantom.

The houses appear in a multiplayer map as part of the Apocalypse DLC map pack in the 2012 video game Call of Duty: Black Ops II.

The houses are referred to in the title of a track on the German pianist Hauschka's 2014 LP Abandoned City.

== See also ==
- Futuro house
- Wanli District, New Taipei, an area known for similar architecture
