= List of crossings of the Tennessee River =

This is a list of bridges and other crossings of the Tennessee River from the Ohio River upstream to its source(s).

== Crossings ==
Image	Crossing	Carries	Location	Coordinates
=== Kentucky ===
	Clark Memorial Bridge	US 60	Reidland/Ledbetter	37.03805°N 88.52890°W
	Luther Draffen Bridge	I-24 / I-69	Calvert City	37.02604°N 88.28588°W
	Unnamed rail bridge	Paducah and Louisville Railroad	Calvert City	37.01254°N 88.27000°W
	George A. (Tony) Ellis Bridge	US 62 / US 641	Calvert City	37.01254°N 88.27000°W
	Kentucky Dam	Local traffic to dam powerhouse (Note: The dam once served as a complete road and rail crossing over the river and the locks that bypass the dam. After the most recent expansion of the locks, separate road and rail bridges were built for through traffic. Currently, the former road crossing carries traffic from the west to the dam's powerhouse and visitor center, but does not cross the locks.)	Calvert City	37.01556°N 88.27255°W
	Eggner's Ferry Bridge	US 68 / KY 80	Trigg County to Marshall County	36.77250°N 88.12033°W
=== Tennessee (Western) ===
	Scott Fitzhugh Bridge	US 79		36.44438°N 88.05986°W
	Danville Toll Ferry	SR 147	McKinnon	36.30103°N 87.95388°W
	Rail Bridge	CSX	Bruceton Subdivision	36.01795°N 87.99643°W
	Hickman-Lockhart Bridge	US 70	New Johnsonville	36.01775°N 87.99642°W
	Jimmy Mann Evans Memorial Bridge	I-40		35.86791°N 87.94320°W
	Alvin C. York Bridge	US 412	Perryville	35.62776°N 88.03375°W
	Clifton Highway Bridge	US 641 / SR 114	Clifton	35.41060°N 88.05218°W
	Lemert Bridge	US 64	Savannah	35.22468°N 88.25887°W
	Pickwick Landing Dam	SR 128	Pickwick Landing State Park	35.06778°N 88.24930°W
=== Alabama ===
	John Coffee Memorial Bridge	Natchez Trace Parkway	Colbert County to Lauderdale County	34.83908°N 87.93278°W
	O'Neal Bridge	US 43 / US 72	Florence to Muscle Shoals	34.78256°N 87.67113°W
	Old Railroad Bridge	pedestrian trail that spans half the river, former Louisville and Nashville Railroad bridge	Florence to Muscle Shoals	34.78256°N 87.66873°W
	Singing River Bridge	SR 133 / SR 157	Florence to Muscle Shoals	34.79212°N 87.64292°W
	Wilson Dam		Florence to Muscle Shoals	34.79779°N 87.62506°W
	Wheeler Dam	SR 101	Suburban Decatur	34.80363°N 87.38163°W
	Norfolk Southern Tennessee River Bridge	Norfolk Southern Memphis District East End; CSX S&NA North Subdivision	Decatur	34.61905°N 86.9795°W
	Captain William J. Hudson "Steamboat Bill" Memorial Bridges	US 31 / US 72 Alt. / SR 20	Decatur	34.61311°N 86.97282°W
	Interstate 65 Tennessee River Bridge	I-65	Decatur	34.57843°N 86.90769°W
	Clement C. Clay Bridge	US 231	Huntsville to Morgan County	34.57557°N 86.56780°W
	Houston Bridge	US 431	Guntersville	34.37230°N 86.28897°W
	Comer Bridge	SR 35	Jackson County	34.63925°N 85.97482°W
	Captain John Snodgrass Bridge	SR 117		34.83357°N 85.80154°W
	Rail bridge	CSX Chattanooga Subdivision	Bridgeport	34.95462°N 85.69893°W
=== Tennessee (Eastern) ===
	Shelby Rhinehart Bridge	SR 156	South Pittsburg and New Hope	35.01507°N 85.69360°W
	Nickajack Dam		Marion County	35.00356°N 85.61970°W
	Holman J. Walker Bridge	I-24	Rankin Cove and Ladds	35.02113°N 85.55000°W
	Marion Memorial Bridge	US 41 / US 72	Rankin Cove and Haletown	35.02824°N 85.54516°W
	P. R. Olgiati Bridge	US 27	Chattanooga	35.05765°N 85.31630°W
	Market Street Bridge	US 127	Chattanooga	35.05791°N 85.30939°W
	Walnut Street Bridge	pedestrians	Chattanooga	35.05783°N 85.30737°W
	Veterans Memorial Bridge		Chattanooga	35.05825°N 85.30233°W
	C.B. Robinson Bridge (Dupont Bridge)	SR 319	Chattanooga	35.09921°N 85.25245°W
	Tenbridge	Norfolk Southern Railway CNOTP Division	Chattanooga	35.10509°N 85.23347°W
	Wilkes T. Thrasher Bridge	SR 153	Chattanooga	35.10466°N 85.22913°W
	Tri-County Veterans Bridge	SR 60	south of Dayton, TN	35.40969°N 85.01898°W
	Bridge	SR 30	west of Decatur, TN	35.53654°N 84.88094°W
	Watts Bar Dam	SR 68		35.62114°N 84.78209°W
	Ernest E. Jones Bridge	SR 58 (Decatur Highway)	south of Kingston, TN	35.85648°N 84.53095°W
	Mitchell W. Stout Bridge	I-75		35.75644°N 84.37367°W
	Rail Bridge			35.74678°N 84.33200°W
	Congressman John J. Duncan Jr. Loudon County Veterans Memorial Bridge	US 11		35.74298°N 84.33106°W
	Gold Star Families Memorial Bridge	US 321		35.79073°N 84.24243°W
	Lt. Alexander "Sandy" Bonnyman Memorial Bridge	I-140	Knox County to Blount County	35.84972°N 84.00887°W
	James E. "Buck" Karnes Bridge	US 129	Knoxville	35.94709°N 83.94587°W
	Rail bridge	CSX KD Subdivision	Knoxville	35.94588°N 83.92491°W
	Rail bridge	Norfolk Southern Railway Knoxville District K&A Line	Knoxville	35.95532°N 83.91976°W
	Henley Bridge	US 441	Knoxville	35.95657°N 83.91808°W
	Gay Street Bridge	Gay Street	Knoxville	35.95839°N 83.91447°W
	James C. Ford Memorial Bridge	SR 71 (James White Parkway)	Knoxville	35.96189°N 83.89750°W
Splits into Holston River and French Broad River

== See also ==
- List of crossings of the Ohio River
