= Olgiati =

Olgiati (pronounced "ol-jotty") is an Italian and Swiss surname. Notable people with this name include:

- Gerolamo Olgiati (1453–1477), government official in Milan
- Girolamo Olgiati, late Renaissance Italian engraver and printmaker
- Giuseppe Olgiati (1660–1736), Roman Catholic bishop
- P.R. Olgiati (1901–1989), American politician from Tennessee
- Rudolf Olgiati (1910–1995), Swiss architect
- Valerio Olgiati (born 1958), Swiss architect

== See also ==
- Olgiati Bridge, bridge in Chattanooga, Tennessee, US, named after the politician
