= Holman J. Walker Bridge =

Bridge in Tennessee, United States

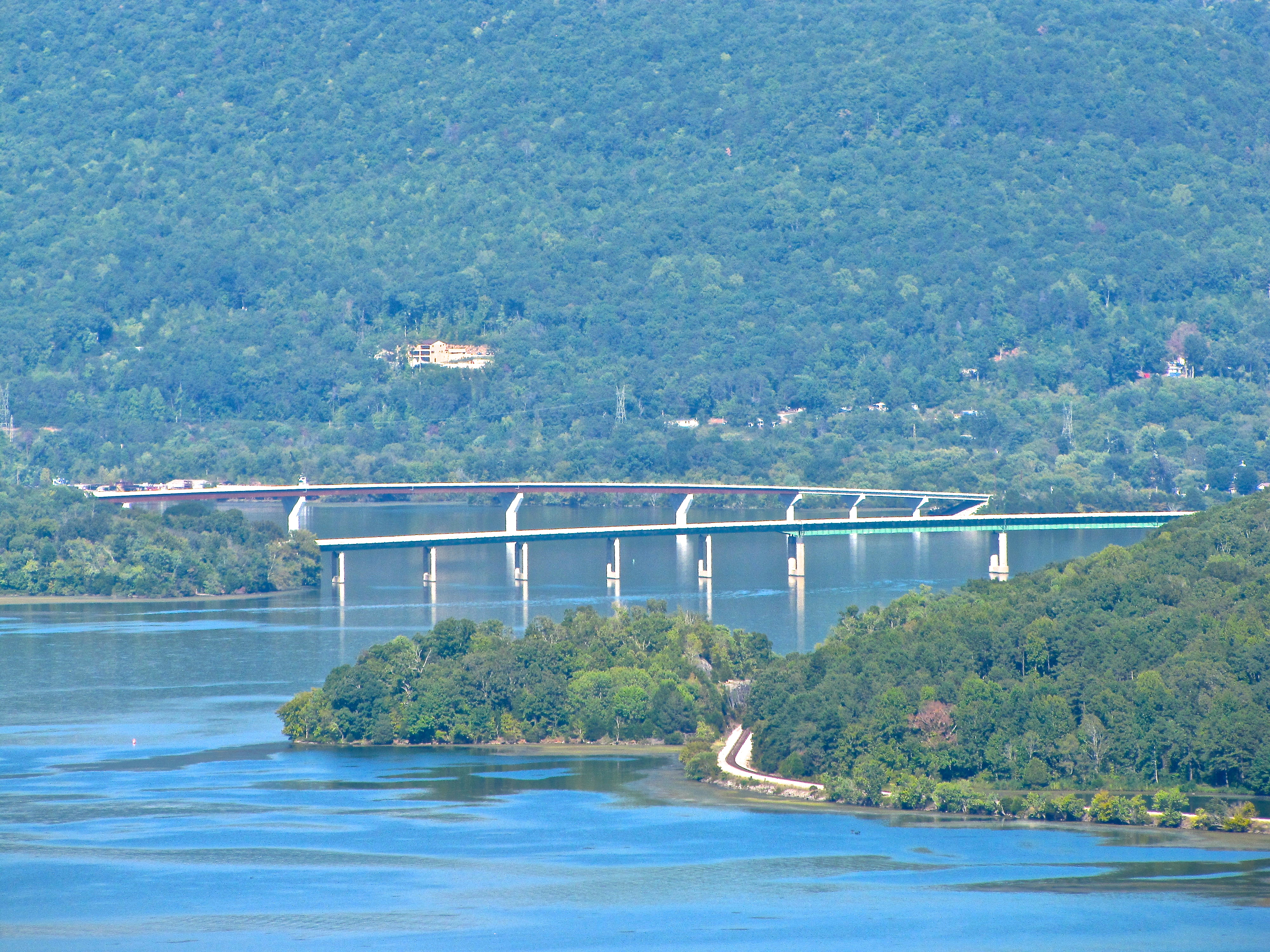
- The Holman J. Walker Bridge (foreground), with the US 41 bridge that replaced the former Marion Memorial Bridge in the background
- Coordinates: 35.020731°N 85.549388°W
- Carries: 4 lanes of I-24
- Crosses: Tennessee River, Nickajack Lake
- Locale: Haletown, Marion County, Tennessee

Characteristics
- Design: Girder bridge
- Total length: 3,115 feet (949 m)
- Width: 65 feet (20 m)
- Height: 70 feet (21 m)

History
- Opened: December 18, 1967

Statistics
- Daily traffic: 45,292 (2025)

Location
- Interactive map of Holman J. Walker Bridge

The Holman J. Walker Bridge is a continuous box and plate girder bridge that carries Interstate 24 (I-24) over the Nickajack Lake impoundment of the Tennessee River in Marion County, Tennessee. It is just slightly upstream from Nickajack Dam and was within sight of the former Marion Memorial Bridge.

== Description and history ==
Construction of the bridge in 1967

The Holman J. Walker Bridge crosses the Nickajack Lake reservoir on the Tennessee River slightly over 1/2 mile (0.80 km) south of the Marion Memorial Bridge (which replaced a former bridge at the site) on U.S. Routes 41 and 64 near the Haletown community. It is also about four miles (6.4 km) northeast of Nickajack Dam. The single-span bridge is 3,115 feet (949 m) long, 65 feet (20 m) wide, and is approximately 70 feet (21 m) above the river at its highest point. It has six spans, and the main span is 420 feet (130 m) long. The bridge carries four lanes and narrow right shoulders, with the east and westbound lanes separated by a Jersey barrier.

The first contract for the bridge's construction, which was for the piers, was awarded on May 7, 1965. The contract for the substructure and approach spans was awarded on June 25, 1965, and the contract for the superstructure was awarded on December 17, 1965. The bridge opened on December 18, 1967, and cost $3.9 million (equivalent to $27.9 million in 2024). It was constructed in conjunction with Nickajack Dam, which was built by the Tennessee Valley Authority to replace Hales Bar Dam slightly upstream of the bridge and completed four days prior.

== See also ==
- List of crossings of the Tennessee River
