= Haletown, Tennessee =

- Unincorporated community
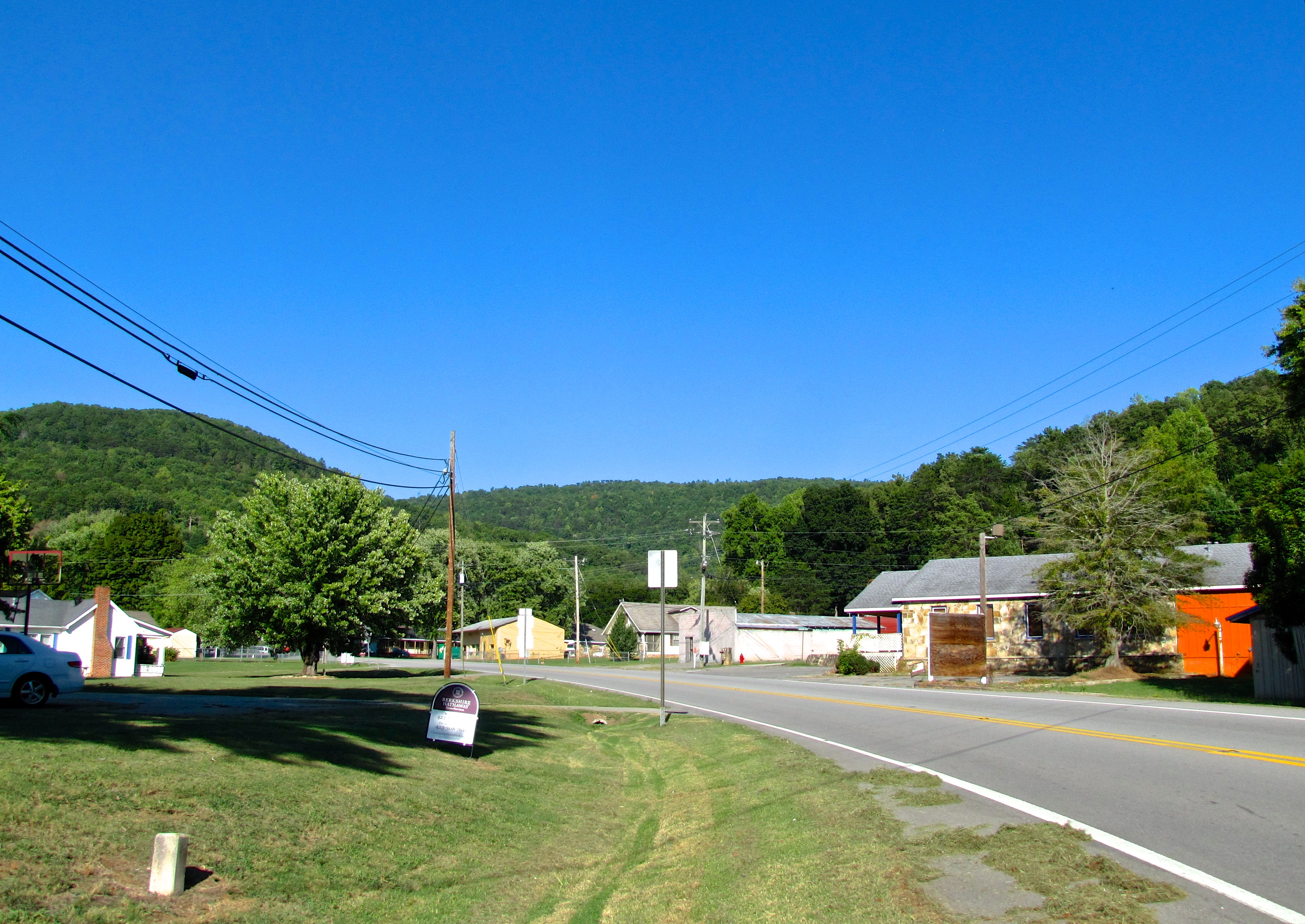
- Haletown

- Location within Tennessee Location within the United States
- Coordinates: 35°01′03″N 85°32′07″W
- Country: United States
- State: Tennessee
- County: Marion
- Elevation: 640 ft (200 m)
- Time zone: UTC-6 (Central (CST))
  - Summer (DST): UTC-5 (CDT)
- ZIP code: 37340
- Area code: 423
- GNIS feature ID: 1639803

Haletown (also known as Guild) is an unincorporated community in Marion County, Tennessee, United States. It is part of the Chattanooga, TN–GA Metropolitan Statistical Area. Haletown is probably best known as the former location of Hales Bar Dam, a major hydroelectric project completed in 1913 by the former Tennessee Electric Power Company (TEPCO) and as a prominent location along the Tennessee River at Nickajack Lake.

== History ==
Formed on former Native American lands and later farmland, the once bustling communities of Haletown and Guild are products of necessity, as both communities were built to house the thousands of workers who built the Hales Bar Dam project in the early 1900s. The area in and around Haletown is rich in history from Native Americans like Cherokee war chief Dragging Canoe, who in the decade preceding his death in 1792, lived nearby at Running Water (Cherokee: ᎠᎼᎦᏳᎾᏱ, romanized: Amogayunayi), a Chickamauga town (now known as the community of Whiteside, Tennessee). Nearby Nickajack Cave was mined for saltpeter beginning in 1800 throughout the War of 1812 and again throughout the American Civil War before being eventually closed and flooded with the waters of Nickajack Lake.

The Guild community was named for Josephus Conn Guild, Sr., a prominent engineer who led construction of the dam until his death in 1907. The dam powerhouse, designed by John Bogart in the Classical Revival style, was added to the National Register of Historic Places in 2008. Haletown's name was derived from a geographically noted sand bar along the river (Hale's Bar) which was named after the Hale family who owned farmland and lived close by to the area. There's still descendants of the original Hale family who live in the Sequatchie Valley to this day. Hale's Bar Dam inherited its name in the same manner.

The community was thriving for many years during the construction of Hales Bar Dam and in the years that followed, with several community schools operating in the area including a school for children of color, along with two post office locations (Guild and Haletown), several churches and some small stores and businesses.

The dam was purchased by the Tennessee Valley Authority in the 1930s, as it was established to have overall authority for flood control and power generation in the Tennessee Valley. It operated the dam into the 1960s, although it was not able to correct problems of leaks even after extensive renovations in the 1940s. The TVA replaced it with Nickajack Dam, built slightly downstream.

After that the TVA partially demolished the Hales Bar Dam. The powerhouse is now used as a private event space and is open for tours. A marina has also been developed there.

Following TVA's renovations to the dam in the 1940s, workers moved on to other projects, and Guild became largely deserted. The post office was moved to Haletown.

Guild Elementary School, which was the last remaining school in the community and part of the local Marion County public school system, closed in the early 1970s with students then being bused to nearby Jasper Elementary School in Jasper, Tennessee instead.

The Guild post office, which opened on August 11, 1906, is now located in Haletown; its ZIP code is 37340.

Being along a major route east to west and eventually by highway, a crossing at the Tennessee River was a necessity. Rankin's Ferry on the Tennessee River between Guild and Shellmound, Tennessee operated here well into the late 1920s. This old river ferry was replaced in the early 1930s with the completion of the Marion Memorial Bridge (or Veteran's Memorial / U.S. Highway 41 bridge) between this point and Hale's Bar. The old ferry landing was inundated by Nickajack Lake (reservoir) after the completion of the TVA's Nickajack Dam in the 1960s.

The former Marion Memorial Bridge (also known as the Marion Veteran's Memorial Bridge or Haletown Bridge) carried U.S. Highway 41, U.S. Highway 64, and U.S. Highway 72 over the Tennessee River at Haletown, but lost most of its traffic to the nearby Holman J. Walker Bridge on Interstate 24 after its completion and the opening of I-24 between Nashville and Chattanooga in the early 1970s. Despite being on the National Register of Historic Places, the iconic metal truss bridge was permanently closed on January 9, 2012, and replaced with a modern, wider, and more driver-friendly steel girder bridge which opened in November 2014, just to the side of its predecessor.

The former truss bridge was demolished in 2015. It was removed from the National Register of Historic Places following its demolition in 2016. While the new bridge is not as iconic as the former, it's much safer and allows easier access when I-24 is backed-up and traffic must use it to detour and cross the new bridge. It is assumed that the new bridge has adopted the "Marion Memorial Bridge" name designation as many now refer to it the same, however it's unclear if that has ever been made official as no signs or markers are present to indicate such.

Tennessee State Route 134 connects the three U.S. Highways to I-24 at Haletown.

== Geography ==
Haletown is located at 35°01′42″N 85°32′19″W (35.0283, -85.5383). The community is situated in the southeastern Sequatchie Valley between the Tennessee River (Nickajack Lake) and Cumberland Plateau on the west and Aetna and Raccoon Mountain (Sand Mountain (Alabama) on the east.

A curve of the Tennessee River and Nickajack Lake and what was once known as Bennett Lake (now part of the Tennessee River Gorge ) and an escarpment of Walden Ridge on the north and I-24 at the south.

To the south of Haletown is an area known as Ladds (a residential area at the base of Ladds Mountain along TN-156). The community of Whiteside, Tennessee lies to the southeast of Haletown on the southern edge of Aetna Mountain bordering I-24.

The Riverside Community lies just east of Haletown in the Tennessee River Gorge along US-41/64/72 between Haletown and Chattanooga.

== Present day ==
The once popular small convenience and bait and tackle store that operated for those enjoying fishing and outdoor recreation along the lake for many years, the locally-legendary 'Anchor Inn Bait & Tackle' (and its in-house restaurant), closed in late 2021 after the property was purchased for future development related to planned luxury mountaintop residential development on nearby Aetna Mountain. The store relocated to property just west of Haletown on US-41 in the former Brendaline Restaurant property across the highway from Nickajack Lake as you make the ascent up Anderson Ridge on US-41. What remains in Haletown are a few small, locally owned, restaurants along with a thriving outdoor recreation scene with those fishing it's riverbanks and taking advantage of the nearby marina. While it's not a tourist destination for most, Hales Bar Dam has gained some popularity in the past two decades after being featured on several "ghost hunter" television and YouTube series, where claims of the former dam being haunted have been made. Ghost tours of the site have brought more tourists to the area now for several years, especially during the Halloween season.

Unlike the majority of Marion County, the Haletown and Guild community is served by Chattanooga's Electric Power Board EPB for electric power. Due to this public utility being in place for the community, Haletown has been served with some of the fastest internet speeds in the area thanks to the utility's expansion into the telecom industry and offering fiber-optic network connections for internet, television, and telephone service to its customers, including Smart Grid technology. Haletown has enjoyed becoming an extension of EPB's "Gig City" as they became the first company in the United States to offer one gigabit-per-second Internet speed to more than 175,000 homes and businesses. This has attracted worldwide attention and earned Chattanooga the nickname "Gig City."

Serodino, Inc. is the only major industrial commercial business in the community, operating an inland shipyard that builds and repairs towboats, excursion boats and barges.

The Nickajack Radio Network, a subsidiary of Carmichael Media, operates from broadcast facility studios in Haletown, TN, which syndicates radio programming, services, information and entertainment for broadcast radio stations and internet stations around the world. Founded in 2010, the local outlet is most well-known locally for their local sports programming and broadcasts for area high schools, including seasonal football broadcasts of the Marion County High School Warriors; Whitwell High School Tigers; South Pittsburg High School Pirates; and Sequatchie County High School Indians, among others, which all originates from their Haletown broadcast facility over nearby local radio stations WEPG and WSDQ.
