= Guntersville Dam =

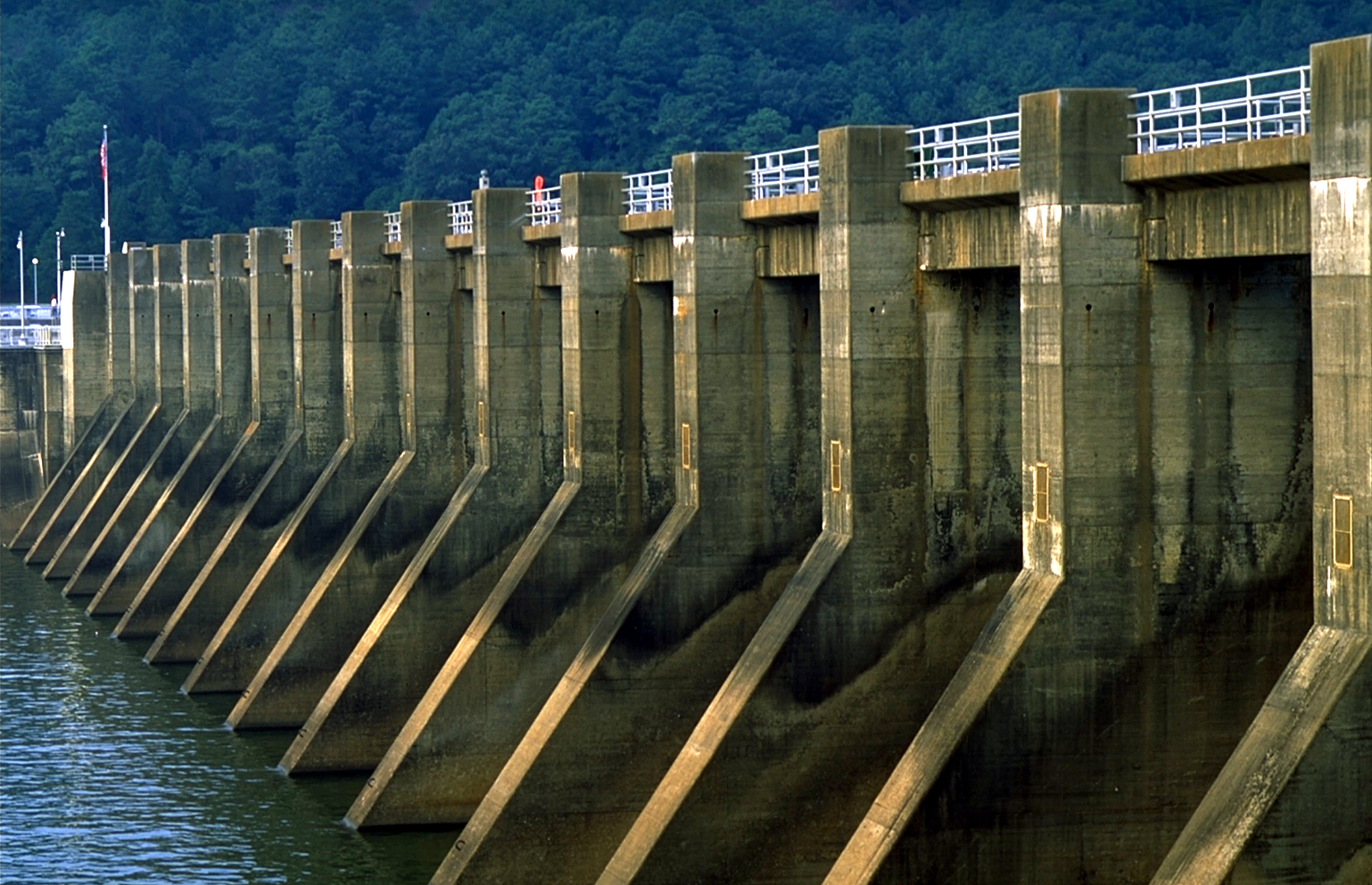
- Guntersville Dam
- Interactive map of Guntersville Dam
- Official name: Guntersville Dam
- Location: Marshall County, Alabama, U.S.
- Coordinates: 34°25′16″N 86°23′35″W
- Construction began: December 4, 1935
- Opening date: January 17, 1939
- Operator: Tennessee Valley Authority

Dam and spillways
- Impounds: Tennessee River
- Height: 94 ft (29 m)
- Length: 3,979 ft (1,213 m)

Reservoir
- Creates: Guntersville Lake
- Total capacity: 1,049,000 acre⋅ft (1,294,000 dam^{3})
- Catchment area: 24,450 mi^{2} (63,300 km^{2})

Guntersville Dam is a hydroelectric dam on the Tennessee River in Marshall County, Alabama. It is one of nine dams on the river owned and operated by the Tennessee Valley Authority, which built the dam in the late 1930s as part of a New Deal era initiative to create a continuous navigation channel on the entire length of the river and bring flood control and economic development to the region. The dam impounds the Guntersville Lake of 67,900 acres (27,500 ha), and its tailwaters feed into Wheeler Lake.

Guntersville Dam is named for the city of Guntersville, Alabama, which is located about 10 miles (16 km) upstream. The city is named for its first settler, John Gunter (d. 1836), who arrived in the late 18th century.

== Location ==
Guntersville Dam is located 349 miles (562 km) above the mouth of the Tennessee River, at a point where the southwestward-flowing river begins to change its course to a more northwestwardly direction. The dam's reservoir stretches for nearly 73 miles (117 km) to the base of Nickajack Dam, and includes parts of Marshall and Jackson counties in Alabama and Marion County in Tennessee. The reservoir's backwaters have formed embayments on the lower parts of Browns Creek and Spring Creek to the west and east of the city of Guntersville, respectively, effectively placing the city at the tip of a long peninsula.

== Capacity ==
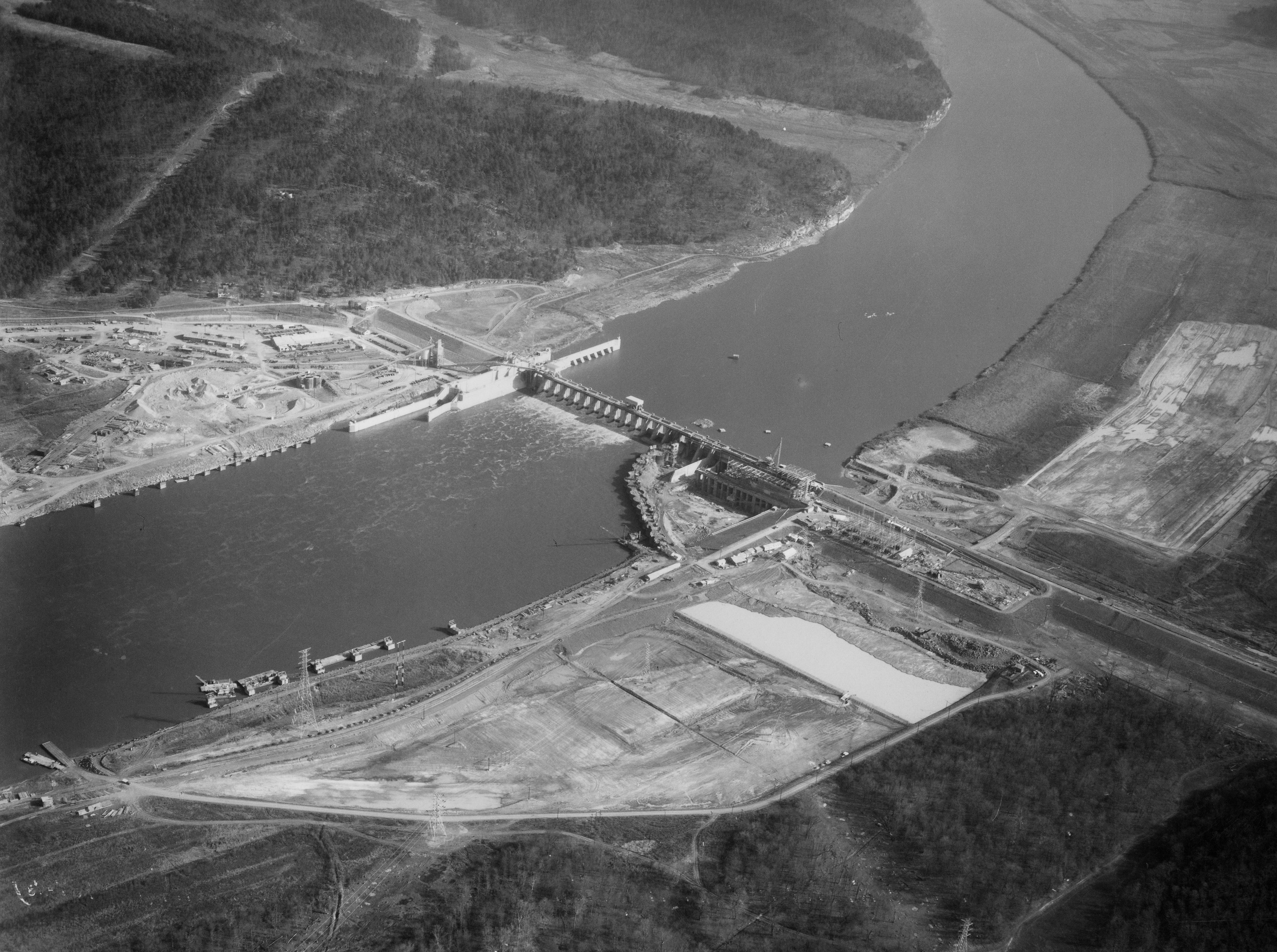
Work below powerhouse at Guntersville Dam, Alabama about 1938-1939

Guntersville Dam is 94 feet (29 m) high and 3,979 feet (1,213 m) wide, and has a generating capacity of 140,400 kilowatts of electricity. The dam's 18-bay spillway has a total discharge capacity of 478,000 cubic feet per second (13,500 m^{3}/s). Its reservoir has a storage capacity of 1,049,000 acre⋅ft (1,294,000 dam^{3}), with 162,000 acre⋅ft (200,000 dam^{3}) reserved for flood control. The reservoir is the most stable reservoir in the TVA system, fluctuating just 2 feet (0.61 m) per year.

Guntersville Dam is serviced by a 110-by-600-foot (34 by 183 m) navigation lock. The lock can lift and lower vessels up to 45 feet (14 m) between Guntersville Lake and Wheeler Lake. The dam's original 60-by-360-foot (18 by 110 m) lock is now used as an auxiliary lock.

== Background and construction ==
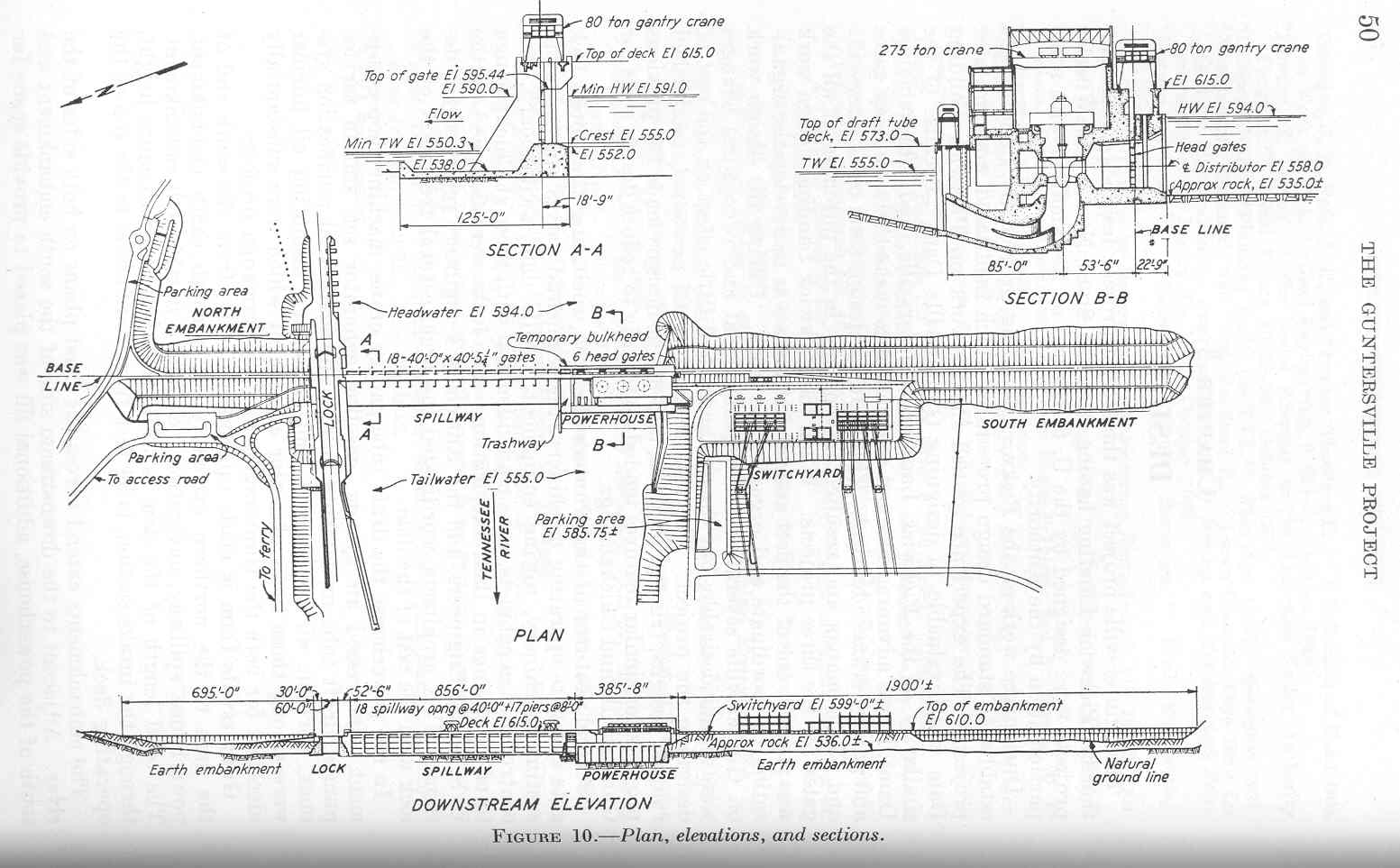
Design plan for Guntersville Dam, circa 1935

In the early 1900s, the U.S. Army Corps of Engineers investigated several possible dam sites in the Guntersville vicinity in hopes of flooding a significant stretch of the river upstream from the city, which had unreliable water levels and had long been an impediment to major navigation in the upper Tennessee Valley. The Corps recommended building a dam at a site approximately 5 miles (8.0 km) upstream from the present dam site in 1914, but never obtained the necessary funding from Congress. More extensive investigations in the 1920s identified several more sites, including the present dam site, which they called the Coles Bend Bar site. After the Tennessee Valley Authority was formed in 1933, the Authority assumed control of all navigation and flood control projects in the Tennessee Valley. In 1935, TVA followed up the Army Corps investigations, deeming a dam at Guntersville necessary to extend the navigation channel beyond Wheeler Lake, which at that time was under construction. Guntersville Dam was authorized November 27, 1935, and construction began a few days later on December 4.

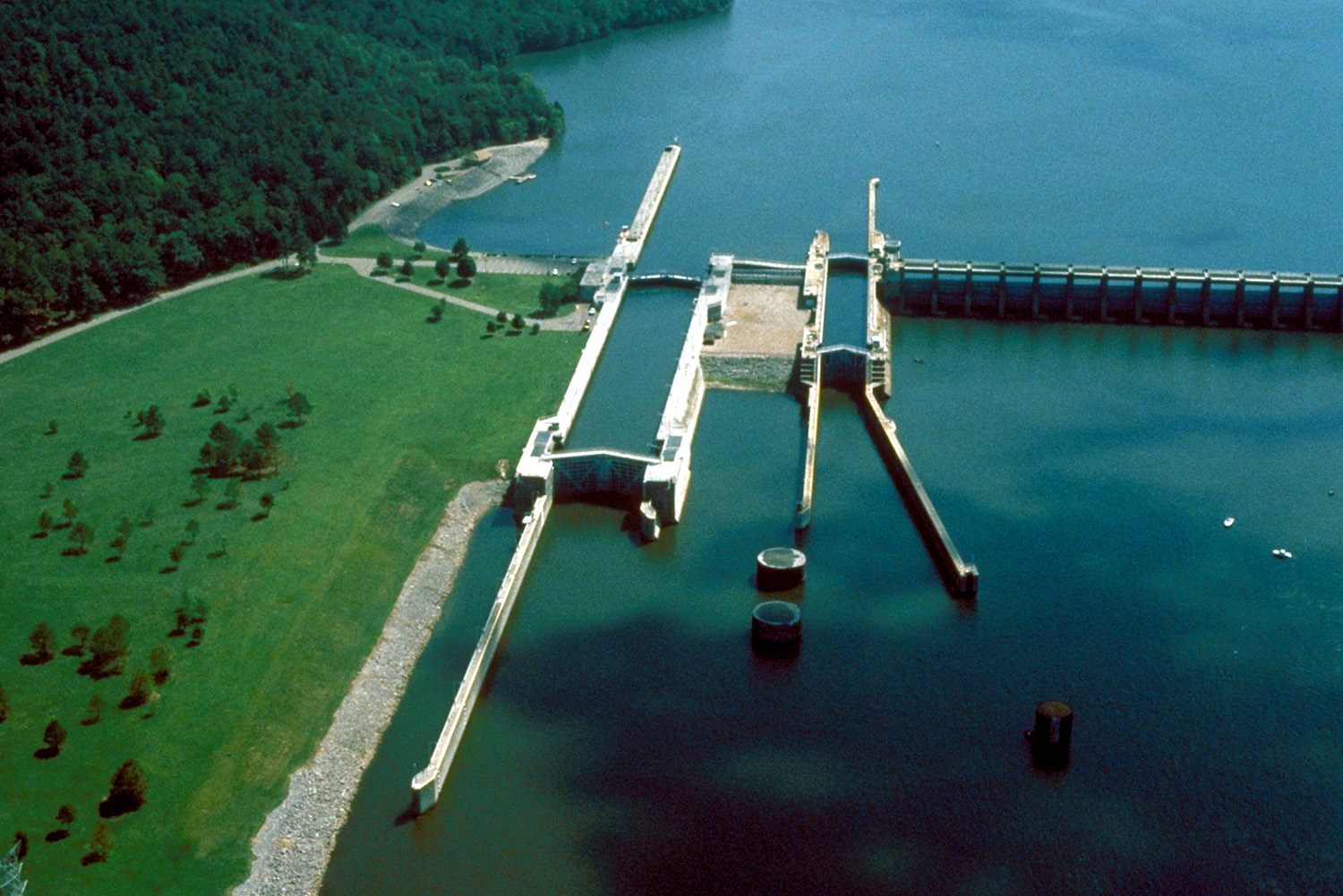
Aerial view of the Guntersville Lock

The construction of Guntersville Dam and its reservoir required the purchase of 110,145 acres (44,574 ha) of land, of which 24,426 acres (9,885 ha) were forested and had to be cleared. 1,182 families, 14 cemeteries, and over 90 miles (140 km) of roads had to be relocated. A large dike was built to protect the city of Guntersville from reservoir backwaters, and substantial dredging was necessary to extend the navigable 9-foot (2.7 m) channel up to Hales Bar Dam (this dam has since been dismantled and replaced by Nickajack Dam, shortening Guntersville Lake). Widows Bar Dam, a small dam and lock approximately 58 miles (93 km) upstream from Guntersville Dam, was partially dismantled and submerged under the lake waters.

Guntersville Dam was completed on January 17, 1939, at a cost of $51 million. The dam's lock was designed by the Army Corps of Engineers and went into operation on January 24, 1939. The dam's first generator went online on August 8, 1939. The hydroelectric project's components were listed on the National Register of Historic Places in 2016.

== See also ==
- Dams and reservoirs of the Tennessee River
- List of crossings of the Tennessee River
- List of Alabama dams and reservoirs
