= I124 =

I124 or I-124 may refer to:

- Interstate 124, a short segment of a four-lane limited access highway
- Iodine-124 (I-124 or ^{124}I), a radioactive isotope of iodine
- Japanese submarine I-124, an I-121 class submarine of the Imperial Japanese Navy
