= Olgiati Bridge =

Highway bridge in Chattanooga, Tennessee

P. R. Olgiati Bridge
- The Olgiati Bridge in the 1960s
- Coordinates: 35.0578°N 85.3164°W
- Carries: 8 lanes of US 27 (SR 27/SR 29)
- Crosses: Tennessee River
- Locale: Chattanooga, Tennessee
- Other name: Ol' Johnny
- Named for: P.R. Olgiati
- Preceded by: Market Street Bridge
- Followed by: Marion Memorial Bridge

Characteristics
- Design: Girder bridge
- Material: Steel

History
- Construction end: November 20, 1959 (initial construction); February 2003 (widening); 2020 (additional widening; expected)

Statistics
- Daily traffic: 79,133 (2025)

Location
- Interactive map of P. R. Olgiati Bridge

The P. R. Olgiati Bridge, often called the "Ol' Johnny" or "Ol' Jolly", is a steel girder bridge across the Tennessee River in Chattanooga, Tennessee completed in 1959. It is named for former mayor and long-time political boss of Chattanooga, P. R. Olgiati. Chattanooga was a growing city during the 1950s. To expand the city and to allow more ways to cross the Tennessee River, the P. R. Olgiati Bridge was one of multiple bridges built. The route carries U.S. Route 27 (US 27) across the Tennessee River.

== Description ==
The P. R. Olgiati Bridge is located in Chattanooga, Tennessee. The bridge is one of several major bridges that crosses the Tennessee River in Chattanooga. These bridges include the Walnut Street Bridge, Market Street Bridge, Veterans Memorial Bridge, and Wilkes T. Thrasher Bridge. The P. R. Olgiati Bridge carries a controlled-access portion of US 27, which is a U.S. Highway that travels south to north. The bridge crosses the Tennessee River just north of downtown, and links the freeway across the ridge en route to Signal Mountain and Red Bank. Surrounding the bridge is the Tennessee Riverwalk on the south side and just before getting to the bridge, US 27 crosses Riverfront Parkway.

== History ==
A few years before the idea for the Olgiati Bridge became a discussion, the Wilkes T. Thrasher Bridge had been built in 1955 to provide a way of traveling across the Tennessee River. The Wilkes T. Thrasher bridge and others were built to help the growth of Chattanooga and to expand the use of the river, as well as to provide more ways of travel. Born a native Tennessean in 1901, Peter Rudolph Olgiati, mainly known as P. R. Olgiati, was appointed to the City Commission and filled the seat of an unexpired term, and later became mayor of Chattanooga for 12 years. He supported the expansion of Chattanooga and building bridges was part of his plan. The bridge expansions were made to contribute to the growth of Chattanooga and to expand the use of the river, as well as to provide more ways of travel for anyone passing through the area.

=== Construction ===
From 1946 to 1951, P. R. Olgiati was appointed to the City Commission and was elected as mayor of Chattanooga and held his position as mayor for 12 years. Olgiati became a man with great authority, power, and responsibility. He ran many of the cities departments and could use his power as an advantage to improve the city. He began his term as mayor by working to draw the state and federal officials attention. After continuous efforts to gain the approval of federal and state officials, Olgiati was granted $100 million to build up the city. Because of his driven ideals, Chattanooga became the very first of any Tennessee major city to have a fully completed interstate system. The new bridge was mainly built because of the excessively used and overcrowded Market and Walnut Street bridges. The bridge was a steel girder bridge, known to be built because they are a high weight supported system. The girder refers to the I-beams that are made up of steel plates that are placed together in order to hold the bridge up. Steel bridges are known to be more costly, but, when built, are much more effective and safe. Olgiati was given the resources to build a well built and supported bridge, which would greatly contribute to travel in Chattanooga. The site was approved in 1954, and construction began the next year. To begin the building process, about one thousand buildings had to be torn down and around 1,400 families had to move. The entire cost of the bridge was approximately $7 million (equivalent to $57.4 million in 2024). The bridge opened to traffic on November 20, 1959. Initially, the bridge was named Cedar Street Bridge, but soon after was renamed P. R. Olgiati Bridge in regards to Mr. Olgiati's efforts to expand Chattanooga.

=== Recent developments ===
Beginning in February 1999, the Olgiati bridge was widened from four to six lanes. This was accomplished by attaching extending steel beams to the top of the posts over the river. Also in this project, a ramp was added from the bridge on the north side to Manufacturer's Road, replacing a hazardous cloverleaf loop ramp which diverged past the bridge. The project, after many delays, was completed in February 2003.

In 2011, TDOT announced a plan to add two more lanes to the bridge. The groundwork for extra lanes was already done in the first widening project. The project has experienced many delays, but TDOT began widening the bridge in a reconstruction of the portion of US 27 in downtown Chattanooga (Interstate 124) which began in late 2015, and is expected to be completed by 2020.

== Gallery ==
Opening day of the bridge: November 20, 1959

Opening day of the bridge and corresponding section of highway

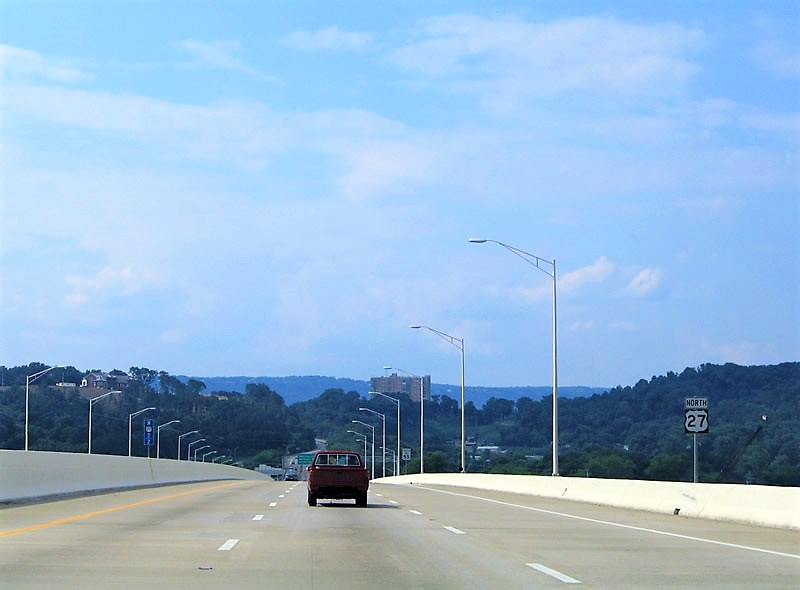
Crossing the Olgiati Bridge in 2009

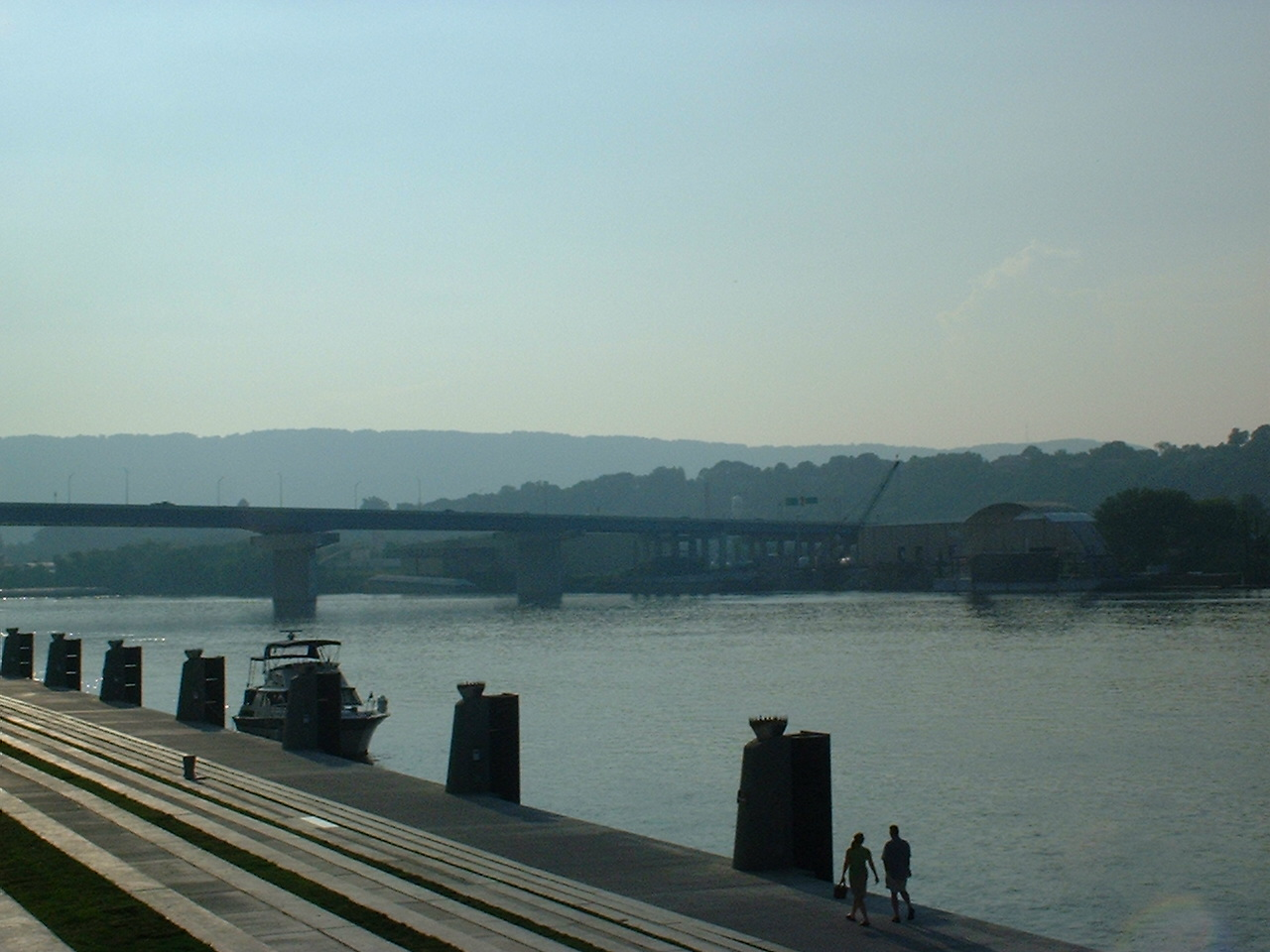
The Olgiati Bridge from the Riverwalk

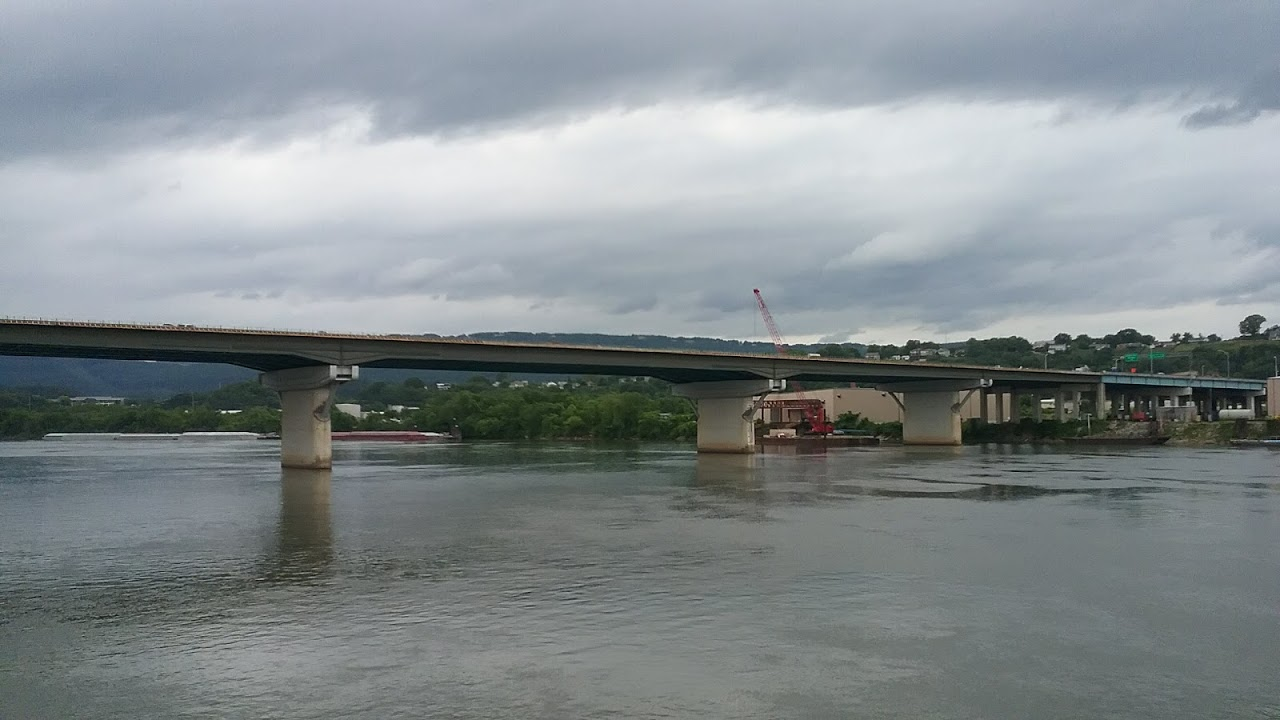
Widening of the Olgiati Bridge in progress, May 2019
