= Wheeler Dam =

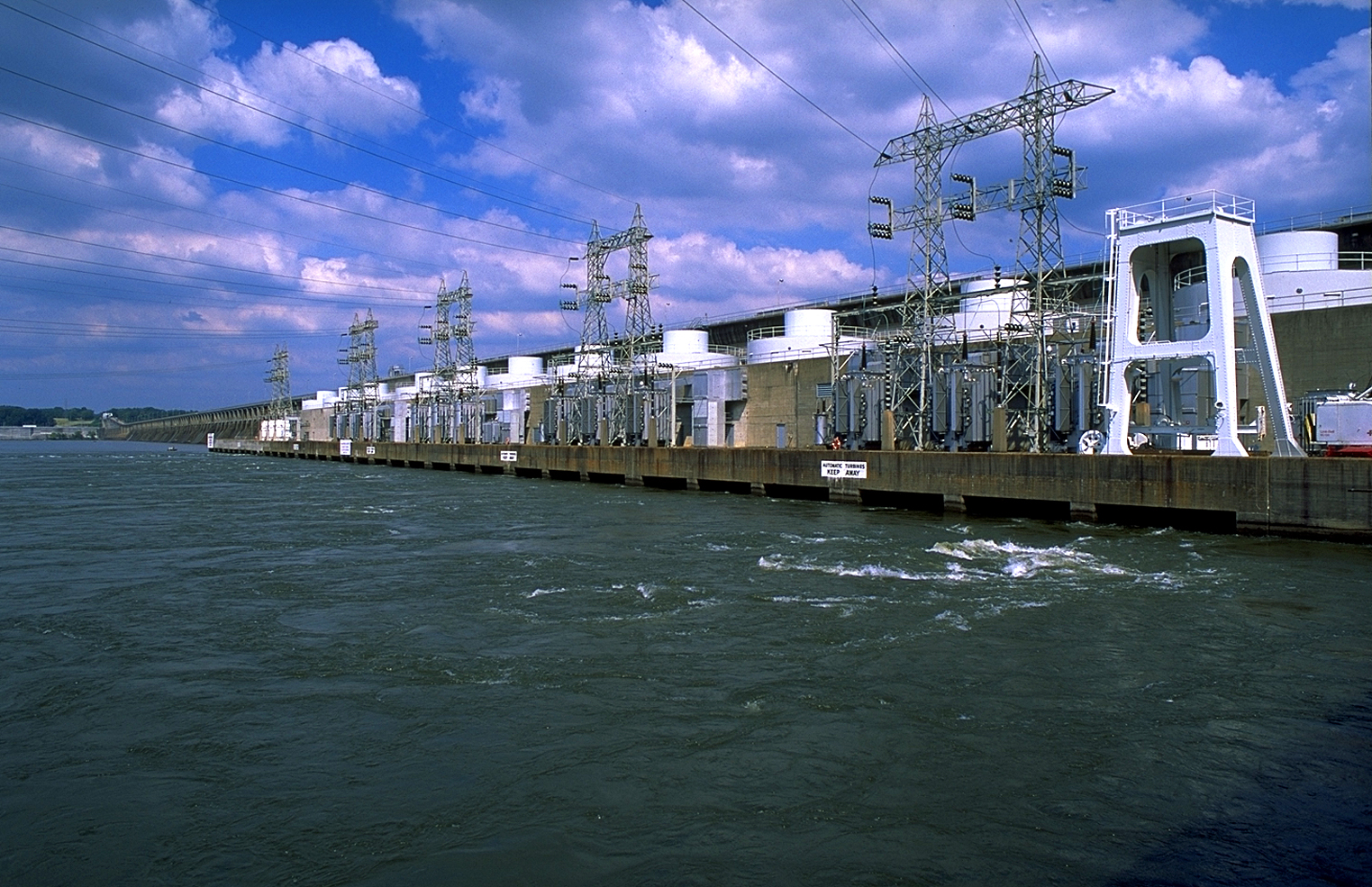
- Wheeler Dam
- Interactive map of Wheeler Dam
- Official name: Wheeler Dam
- Location: Lauderdale County and Lawrence County, Alabama, U.S.
- Coordinates: 34°48′25″N 87°22′55″W
- Construction began: November 21, 1933
- Opening date: November 9, 1936
- Operator: Tennessee Valley Authority

Dam and spillways
- Impounds: Tennessee River
- Height: 72 ft (22 m)
- Length: 6,342 ft (1,933 m)

Reservoir
- Creates: Wheeler Lake
- Wheeler Hydroelectric Project
- U.S. National Register of Historic Places
- Location within Alabama Location within the United States
- Nearest city: Rogersville, Alabama
- NRHP reference No.: 16000431
- Added to NRHP: June 26, 2016

Wheeler Dam is a hydroelectric dam on the Tennessee River between Lauderdale County and Lawrence County, Alabama. It is one of nine dams on the river owned and operated by the Tennessee Valley Authority, which built the dam in the mid-1930s as part of a New Deal-era initiative to improve navigation on the river and bring flood control and economic development to the region. The dam impounds the Wheeler Lake of 67,070 acres (27,140 ha) and its tailwaters feed into Wilson Lake.

Wheeler Dam is named for Civil War general and U.S. Congressman Joseph Wheeler. Congressman Wheeler was an early advocate of federal development of the Muscle Shoals area. The dam was listed on the National Register of Historic Places in 2016.

== Location ==
Wheeler Dam is located 275 miles (443 km) above the mouth of the Tennessee River, a few miles downstream from the river's Elk River confluence. The dam is roughly 7 miles (11 km) southwest of Rogersville and about 30 miles (48 km) downstream from Decatur. The dam's reservoir stretches for 74 miles (119 km) along the river to the base of Guntersville Dam to the east. Wilson Dam and the city of Muscle Shoals are located just 15 miles (24 km) downstream of Wheeler Dam. Alabama State Route 101 (Wheeler Dam Highway) crosses the top of the dam.

== Capacity ==
At 72 feet (22 m) high, Wheeler is the longest of TVA's Tennessee River dams. The dam is 6,342 feet (1,933 m) long at its crest, and has an electrical generating capacity of 411,800 kilowatts. The dam's spillway is equipped with 60 tainter gates with a combined discharge of 542,000 cubic feet per second (15,300 m^{3}/s). The dam's reservoir has 1,027 miles (1,653 km) of shoreline and 67,070 acres (27,140 ha) of water surface, and has a flood-storage capacity of 326,484 acre-feet (402,712,000 m^{3}).

Wheeler Dam has two locks for river traffic, the main lock being 110 by 600 feet (34 by 183 m) and an auxiliary lock measuring 60 by 360 feet (18 by 110 m). The locks raise and lower vessels up to 52 feet (16 m) between Wheeler and Wilson lakes.

== Background and construction ==
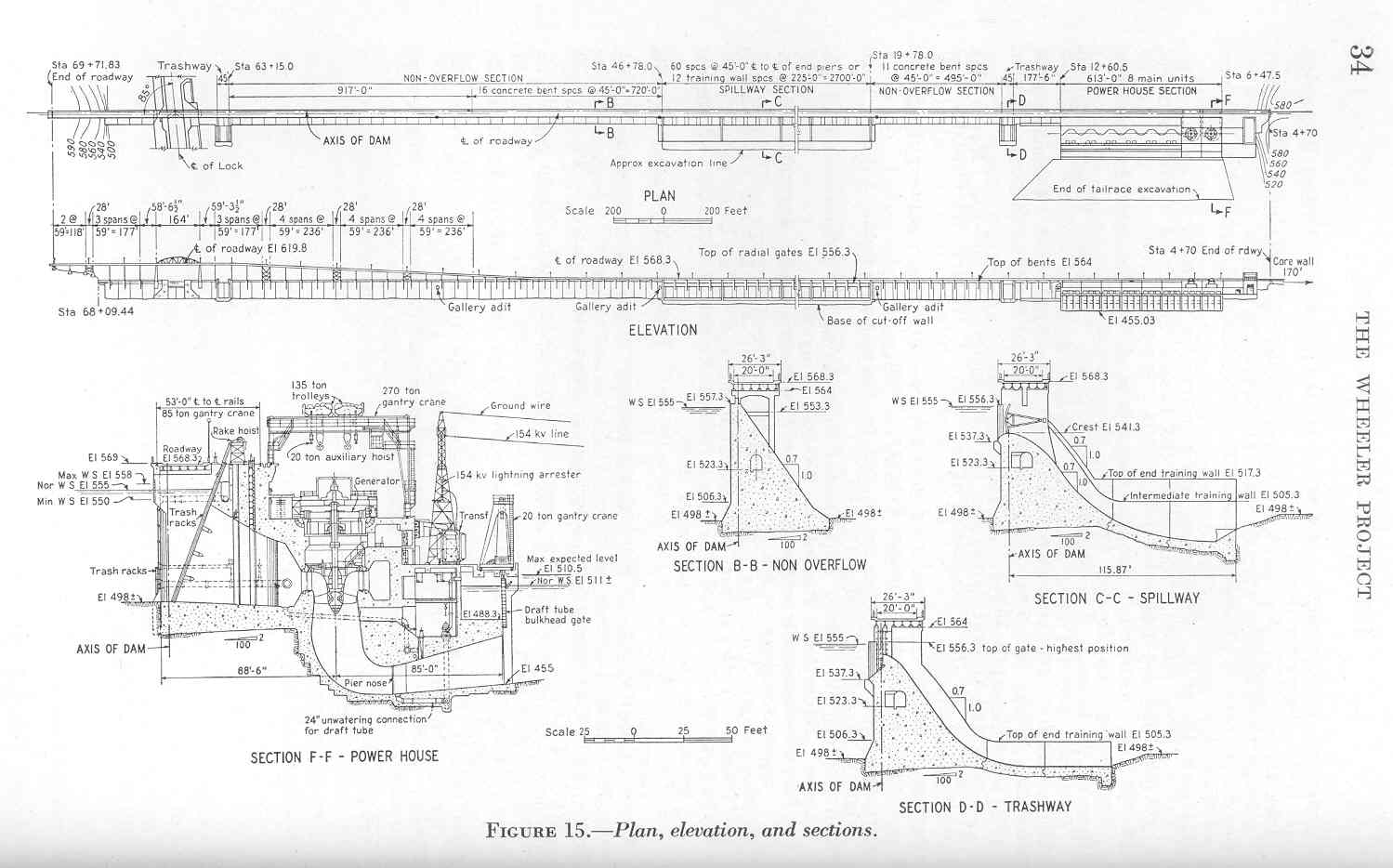
Design plan for Wheeler Dam, circa 1933

The stretch of the Tennessee River between Decatur and Florence drops over 130 feet (40 m) in elevation, creating what was once a series of rapids known as the Muscle Shoals and the Elk River Shoals. Along with the Tennessee River Gorge to the east, these shoals had long been an impediment to river navigation, effectively isolating the upper Tennessee Valley from the nation's major inland waterways. Canal work in the 19th century had improved navigation through the shoals, but were insufficient for major river traffic. In 1898, Congressman Joe Wheeler introduced legislation in Congress that obtained federal funding for navigation improvements. The construction of Wilson Dam in the 1920s and various other improvements helped create a 6-foot (1.8 m) channel over the shoals, but even then navigation was only possible during times of high water flow. The Corps of Engineers had planned to build a dam at the Wheeler site in the early 1930s, and had gained authorization for the dam's lock, although the project was assumed by the Tennessee Valley Authority shortly after the Authority's creation in 1933. Construction work on Wheeler Dam began on November 21, 1933, the second major dam construction project (after Norris) attempted by TVA.

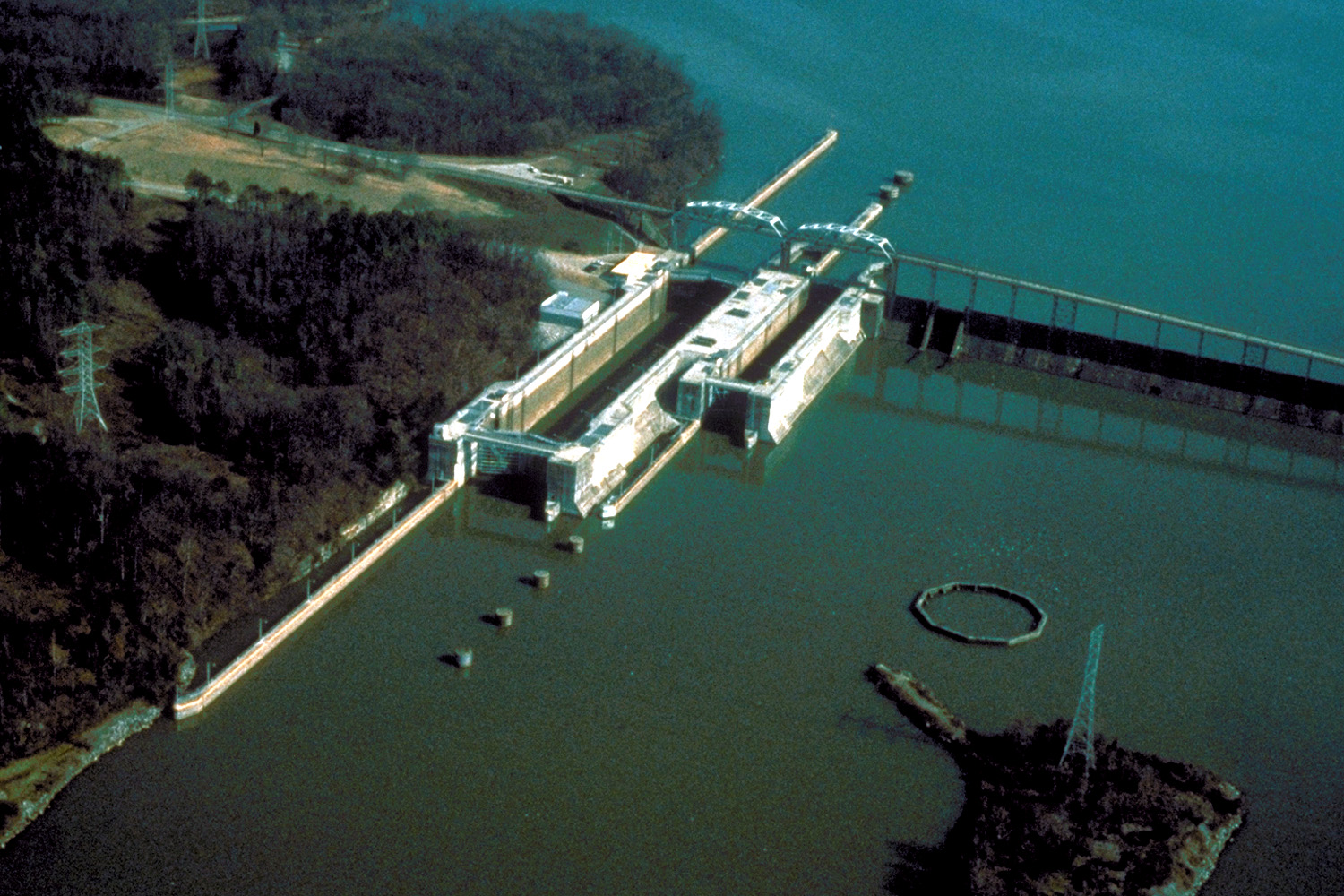
Aerial view of Wheeler's lock

The construction of Wheeler Dam required the purchase of 103,400 acres (41,800 ha) of land, 31,228 acres (12,638 ha) of which had to be cleared. 840 families, 176 graves, and 30 miles (48 km) of roads had to be relocated. Work began as soon as possible as an unemployment relief measure, and at peak activity the project employed 4,700 workers. As TVA lacked dam construction experience, the Authority relied heavily on the Army Corps of Engineers and the U.S. Bureau of Reclamation for the dam's design. The Army Corps also designed and built the dam's locks.

Wheeler Dam was completed on November 9, 1936, constructed at a cost of $87,655,000. Dredge work continued until the following year to extend the navigation channel to Guntersville Dam, which at the time was under construction.

== See also ==
- Dams and reservoirs of the Tennessee River
- List of crossings of the Tennessee River
- List of Alabama dams and reservoirs
