= 1962 Tennessee gubernatorial election =

- November 6, 1962
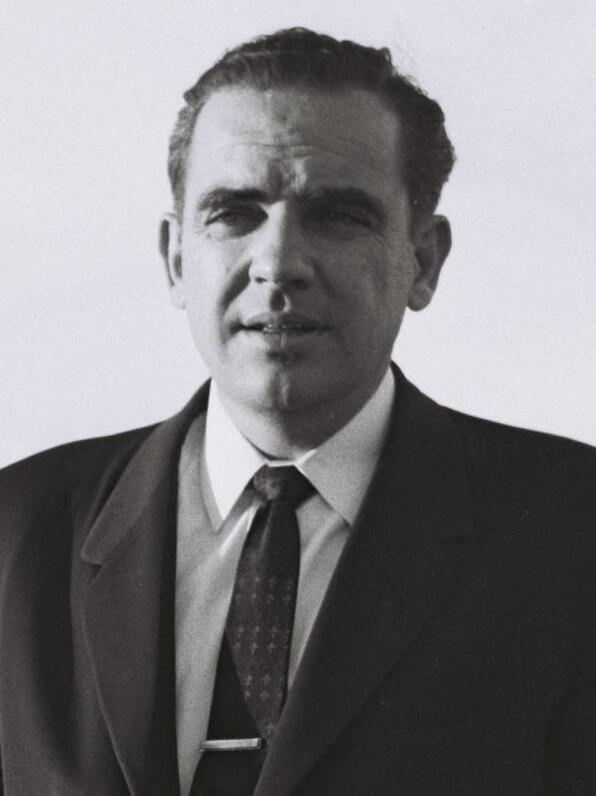

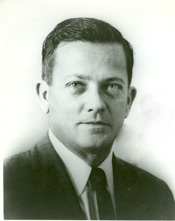

Nominee	Frank G. Clement	William Anderson	Hubert David Patty
Party	Democratic	Independent	Republican
Popular vote	315,648	203,765	99,884
Percentage	50.85%	32.83%	16.09%
- County results Clement: 40–50% 50–60% 60–70% 70–80% 80–90% Anderson: 30–40% 40–50% 50–60% Patty: 30–40% 40–50% 50–60%
Governor before election
Buford Ellington
Democratic
Elected Governor
Frank G. Clement
Democratic

The 1962 Tennessee gubernatorial election was held on November 6, 1962, to elect the next governor of Tennessee. Incumbent Democratic governor Buford Ellington was ineligible to run for re-election, as the Constitution of Tennessee prohibited governors from serving consecutive terms at the time. Former Democratic governor Frank G. Clement defeated independent candidate William Anderson, and Republican nominee Hubert Patty, with 50.9% of the vote.

In the primary, Clement defeated Memphis attorney Bill Farris and Chattanooga mayor Rudy Olgiati.

== Primary elections ==
Primary elections were held on August 2, 1962.

=== Democratic primary ===
43.1% of the voting age population participated in the Democratic primary.

==== Candidates ====
- Frank G. Clement, former governor
- P.R. Olgiati, Mayor of Chattanooga
- William W. Farris
- Lillard Anthony Watts
- Ronald Little

==== Results ====
Democratic primary results
Party	Candidate	Votes	%
Democratic	Frank G. Clement	309,333	42.54%
Democratic	P.R. Olgiati	211,812	29.13%
Democratic	William W. Farris	202,813	27.89%
Democratic	Lillard Anthony Watts	2,153	0.30%
Democratic	Ronald Little	1,087	0.15%
Total votes		727,198	100.00%

== General election ==
=== Candidates ===
Major party candidates

- Frank G. Clement, Democratic
- Hubert David Patty, Republican

Other candidates

- William Anderson, Independent
- E.B. Bowles, Independent

=== Results ===
1962 Tennessee gubernatorial election
Party	Candidate	Votes	%	±%
Democratic	Frank G. Clement	315,648	50.85%	
Independent	William Anderson	203,765	32.83%	
Republican	Hubert David Patty	99,884	16.09%	
Independent	E.B. Bowles	1,441	0.23%	
		20	0.00%	
Majority		215,764		
Turnout		620,758		
Democratic hold		Swing		

== Works cited ==
- Steed, Robert; Moreland, Laurence; Baker, Tod, eds. (1980). Party Politics in the South. Praeger Publishers. ISBN 0030565863.
