= Interstate 124 =

Highway in Tennessee

Interstate 124
- I-124 highlighted in red

Route information
- Auxiliary route of I-24
- Maintained by TDOT
- Length: 1.92 mi (3.09 km)
- Existed: November 12, 1958–present
- NHS: Entire route

Major junctions
- South end: I-24 / US 27 in Chattanooga
- North end: US 27 in Chattanooga

Location
- Country: United States
- State: Tennessee
- Counties: Hamilton

Highway system
- Interstate Highway System; Main; Auxiliary; Suffixed; Business; Future; Tennessee State Routes; Interstate; US; State
← SR 123	→ SR 124

Interstate 124 (I-124) is an unsigned auxiliary Interstate Highway located in Chattanooga, Tennessee. At a length of 1.92 miles (3.09 km), the route is concurrent with U.S. Route 27, and forms the southernmost section of a much longer freeway that runs from Interstate 24 and provides access to Dayton and Dunlap to the north. The route also serves as a spur route to downtown Chattanooga.

I-124 was constructed in the late 1950s. Since the late 1980s, the route has been unsigned, and marked on signs and mile markers as US 27, The Tennessee Department of Transportation official map no longer designates it as I-124, but some DOT publications still make reference to the designation, and its exit numbers remain. The entire highway was reconstructed and expanded between 2015 and 2021 as part of a larger plan to modernize the roadway.

== Route description ==
The US 27 freeway diverges from I-24 just before the Moccasin Bend in the Tennessee River, continues north through downtown Chattanooga, and then across the Tennessee River as a limited-access freeway on the P. R. Olgiati Bridge. The river is the point at which the I-124 designation ends. After crossing the river, the freeway continues under the US 27 designation for another 30 miles (48 km), beyond which the spur continues under the State Route 111 (SR 111) designation for a further 20 miles (32 km).

The entire length of I-124 is part of the National Highway System, a system of routes determined to be the most important for the nation's economy, mobility, and defense.

== History ==
The route that is now I-124 was proposed in the 1950s by then-mayor of Chattanooga P.R. "Rudy" Olgiati to provide a secondary access across the Tennessee River and relieve congestion, which had developed on the Market Street and Walnut Street bridges. Construction of the Olgiati Bridge begin in 1955. Work on the section of highway between Martin Luther King Jr. Boulevard and the bridge began in 1957, and the section opened to traffic on November 20, 1959. The southern portion, located between I-24 and Martin Luther King Jr. Boulevard, was built between 1961 and 1963, when that corresponding section of I-24 was built. The interchange with I-24, known as the "Big Scramble", was reworked in the late 1980s and early 1990s, and the I-124 signage was removed at this time.

A major reconstruction project commenced in December 2015 to widen and modernize I-124, which reconstructed all interchanges, provided adequate shoulders and median dividers, widened the route to six lanes, and removed the S-curve at the 4th Street interchange. Originally scheduled to be completed by July 2019, the project ran into multiple setbacks, which delayed the completion until January 2021.

== Exit list ==
The entire route is in Chattanooga, Hamilton County.

mi	km	Exit	Destinations	Notes
0.0	0.0	—	I-24 (US 27 south/SR 27 east/SR 29 south) to I-75 – Atlanta, Knoxville, Nashville, Birmingham	Southern terminus; southern end of US 27 concurrency; southbound exit and northbound entrance
0.5	0.80	1A	Carter Street, W Main Street	Partial interchange consisting of an exit from the northbound lanes and entrance to the southbound lanes
0.7– 1.2	1.1– 1.9	1A/1B/1C	Martin Luther King Boulevard (SR 316), 6th Street, 4th Street (SR 389)– Downtown	Signed as exit 1B (Martin Luther King Boulevard) and 1C (4th Street) from the northbound lanes; signed as exits 1B-C (4th Street, 6th Street, W Martin Luther King Boulevard) and exit 1A (E Martin Luther King Boulevard) from southbound lanes; no northbound access to 6th Street; unsigned SR 316 and SR 389.
1.7	2.7	—	US 27 north (SR 27 west/SR 29 north) – Red Bank, Dayton, Signal Mountain	Continuation as US 27 at the Tennessee River, on the P. R. Olgiati Bridge
1.000 mi = 1.609 km; 1.000 km = 0.621 mi: Concurrency terminus; Incomplete access
