= Clement C. Clay Bridge =

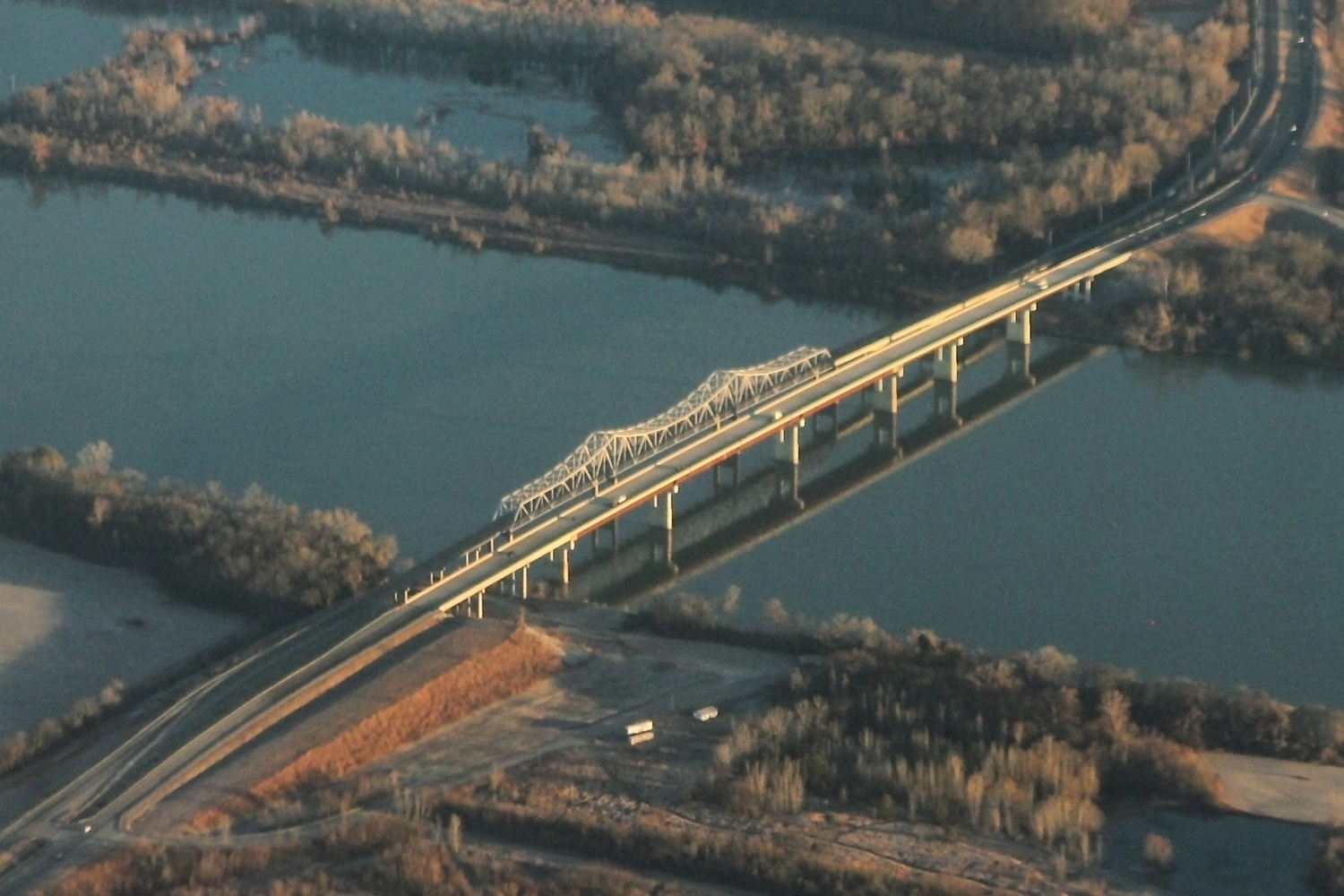
- Aerial view of the bridge in 2014
- Coordinates: 34°34′34″N 86°34′01″W
- Carries: US 231
- Crosses: Tennessee River
- Locale: Huntsville
- Official name: CC Clay Bridge
- Other name: Whitesburg Bridge
- Named for: Clement C. Clay
- Preceded by: Whites Ferry

Characteristics
- Design: Cantilever truss

History
- Opened: 1931

Location
- Interactive map of Clement C. Clay Bridge

The Clement C. Clay Bridge (CC Clay Bridge or Whitesburg Bridge) is a twin bridge over the Tennessee River just south of Huntsville in the northern part of Alabama. The bridge was named after former Alabama Governor and US Senator Clement Comer Clay.

The bridge carries US-231 and unsigned SR-53 between the Huntsville Metropolitan Area and the Decatur Metropolitan Area. Before the 1952 extension of US-231, the bridge carried SR-38. North of the bridge, US-231 is known as Memorial Parkway.

== History ==
Postcard of the 1931 span alone

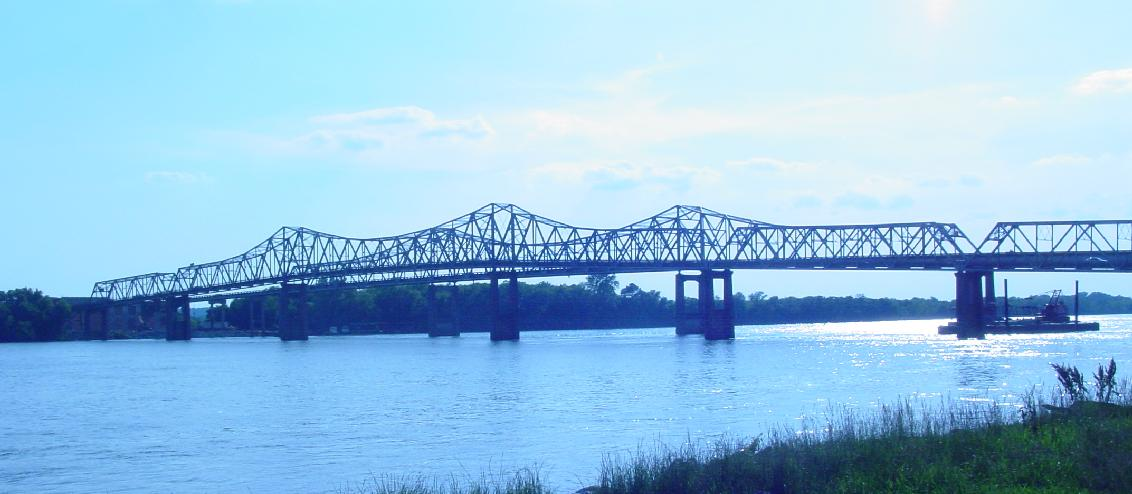
The bridge in 2004, with the 1931 span in front of the 1965 span

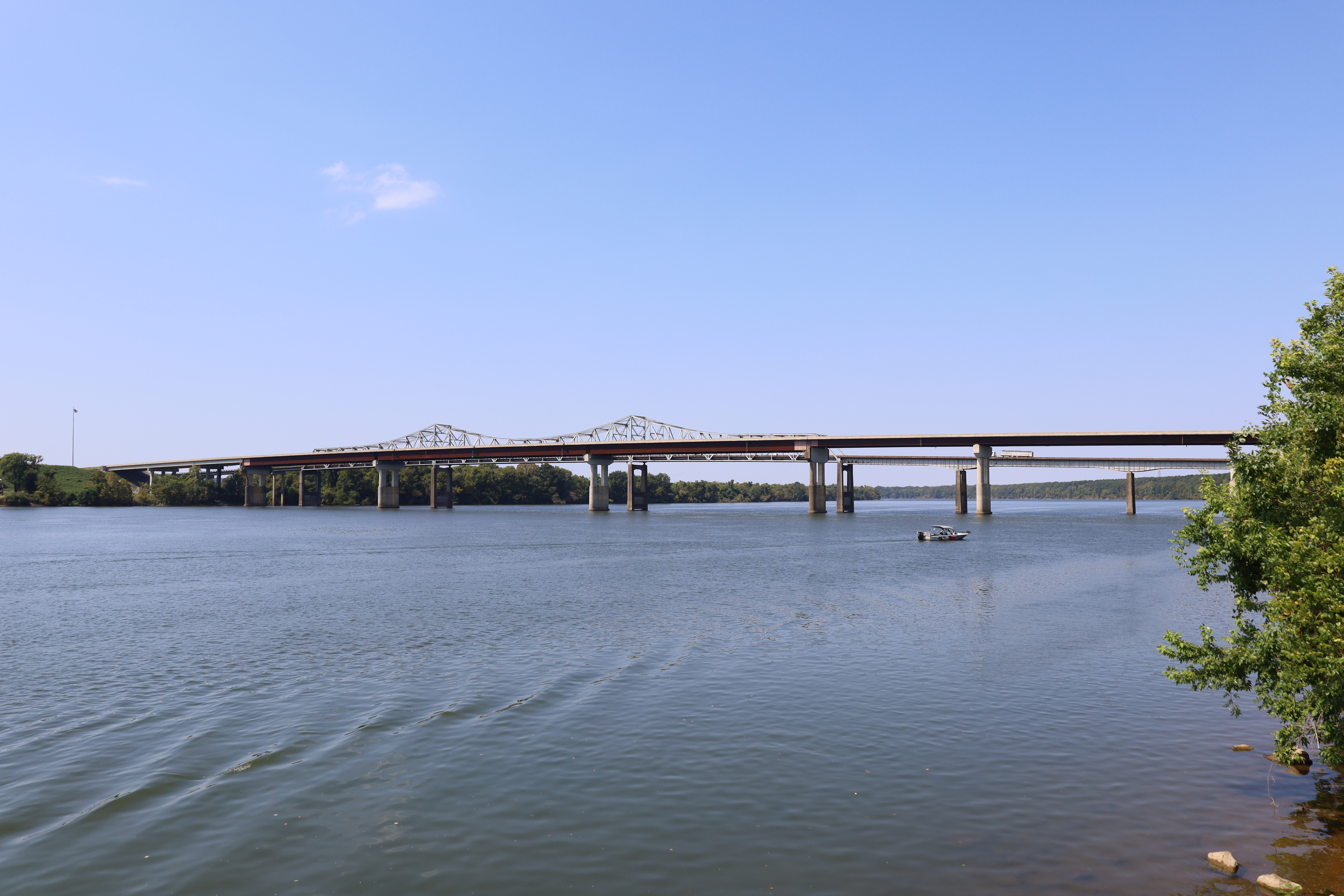
The bridge in 2025, with the 2006 concrete span in front of the 1965 span

The original bridge a cantilever truss single span, was built in 1931, replacing Whites Ferry which crossed the river at nearby Ditto Landing.

The second cantilever truss span was constructed in 1965. Upon completion, the newer span carried southbound traffic while the original span carried northbound traffic.

The 1931 span was replaced by a reinforced concrete structure, which opened in June 2006. Demolition of the original span began on August 16, 2006.

== See also ==
- List of crossings of the Tennessee River
