= Norfolk Southern Tennessee River Bridge =

Bridge

Coordinates: 34.6179°N 86.9807°W

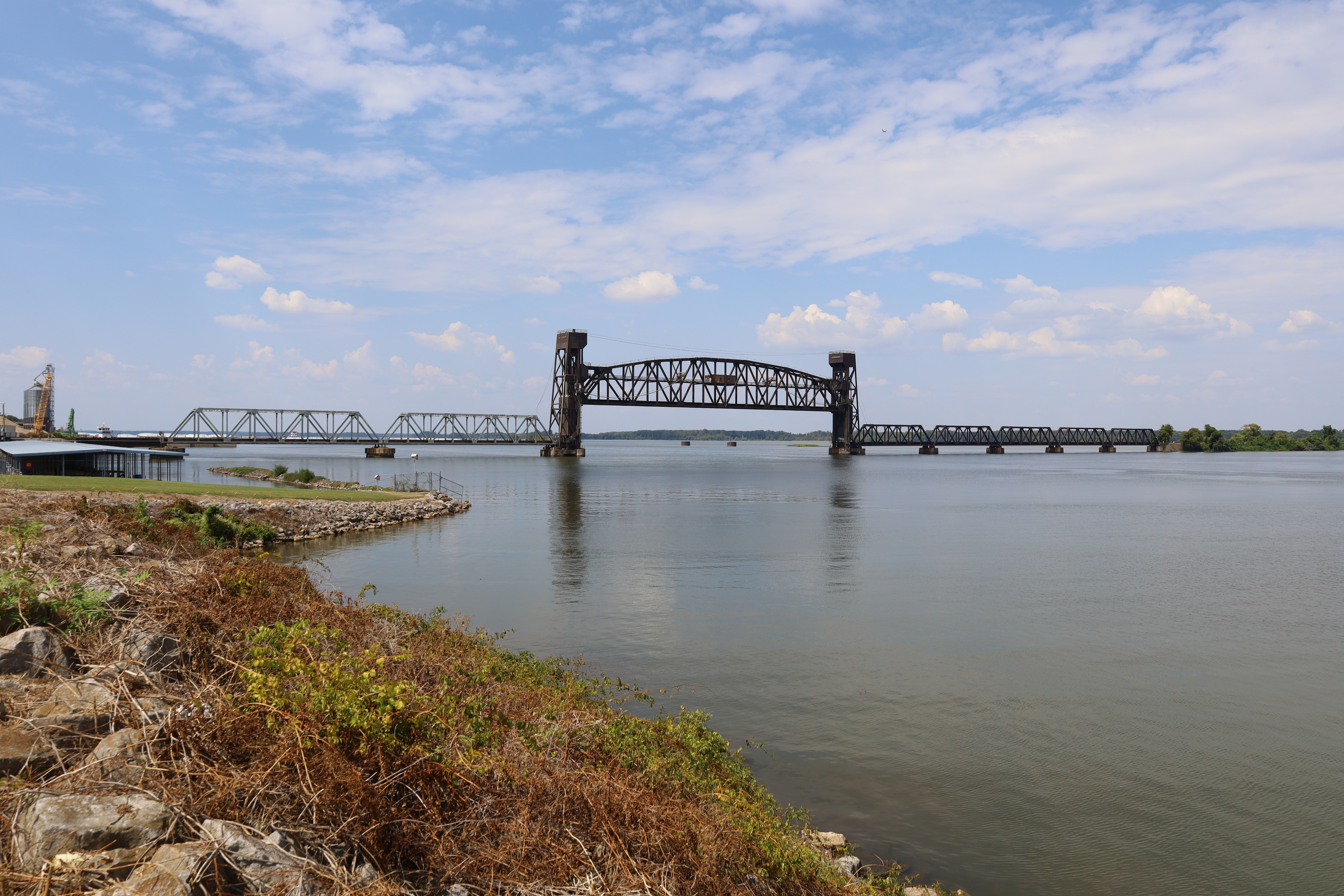
The bridge in the open position in 2025

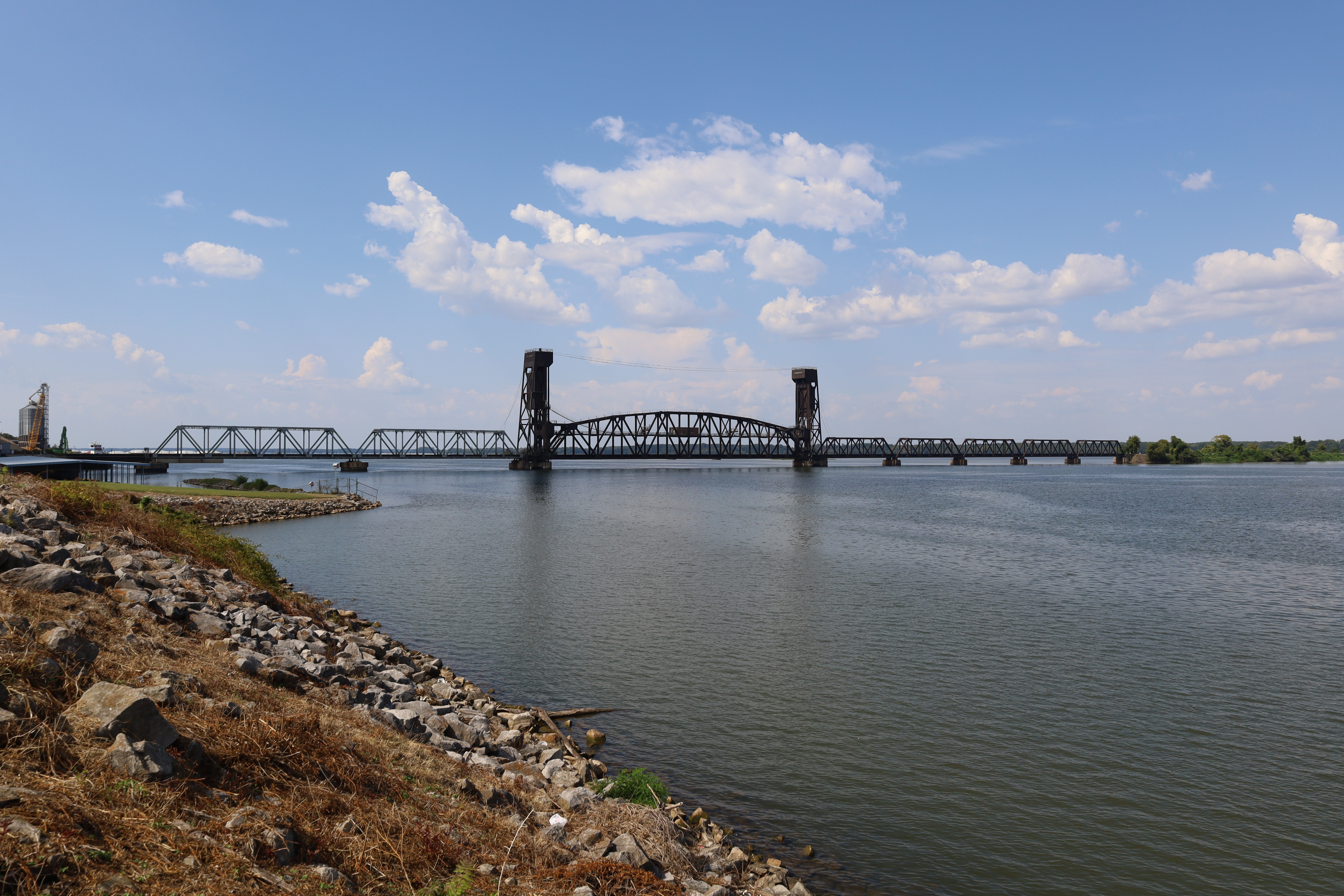
The bridge in the closed position in 2025

The Norfolk Southern Tennessee River Bridge is a lift bridge operated by the Norfolk Southern Railway over the Tennessee River. It crosses from the city of Decatur in Morgan County to unincorporated Limestone County in the north central part of Alabama in the United States. While it is owned and operated by Norfolk Southern, the majority of the railroad traffic over the bridge is from another company, CSX Transportation.

There has been a railroad bridge or ferry at this location since the late 1850s. The bridge is on the Norfolk Southern mainline between Sheffield, Alabama and Chattanooga, Tennessee and the CSXT mainline between Birmingham, Alabama and Nashville, Tennessee (S&NA North Subdivision).

== See also ==
- List of crossings of the Tennessee River
