= Widows Bar Dam =

Historical dam from 1924 in Alabama's Tennessee River

Coordinates: 34°52′56″N 85°45′02″W

Widows Bar Lock and Dam
- Interactive map of Widows Bar Lock and Dam
- Country: United States
- Location: Jackson County, Alabama
- Status: Operational
- Opening date: 1924

Widows Bar Lock and Dam was a dam once located along the Tennessee River in Jackson County, Alabama, USA. It was situated 407 miles (655 km) above the mouth of the Tennessee River, near the river's confluence with Widows Creek. The dam was completed 8 September 1924, and was designed and operated by the U.S. Army Corps of Engineers. It was serviced by a 60-foot (18 m) by 265-foot (81 m) navigation lock. When the Tennessee Valley Authority took control of flood control and navigation improvement operations in the Tennessee Valley in the 1930s, Widows Bar was considered too high maintenance, and it was dismantled as part of the construction of Guntersville Dam.

The Widows Bar Dam site is currently occupied by Widows Creek Power Plant, a coal-fired plant built in the early 1950s. What remained of the dam after its dismantling is now submerged under Guntersville Lake.
