= Mitchell W. Stout Bridge =

- Coordinates: 35.75644°N 84.37367°W
- Carries: 4 lanes of I-75
- Crosses: Watts Bar Lake, Tennessee River
- Locale: Loudon County, Tennessee

Characteristics
- Design: Girder bridge
- Total length: 1,671.9 feet (509.6 m)
- Width: 42 feet (13 m) (both spans)
- Height: 54.5 feet (16.6 m)

History
- Opened: December 20, 1974

Statistics
- Daily traffic: 57,943 (2025)

Location
- Interactive map of Mitchell W. Stout Bridge

The Mitchell W. Stout Medal of Honor Memorial Bridge, commonly known as the Mitchell W. Stout Bridge, is a pair of steel girder bridges that carry Interstate 75 (I-75) across the Watts Bar Lake impoundment of the Tennessee River in Loudon County, Tennessee.

== Description and history ==
The Mitchell W. Stout Bridge is maintained by the Tennessee Department of Transportation. It is located in unincorporated Loudon County, Tennessee, about two miles (3.2 km) west of the county seat of Loudon. It consists of two spans of steel plate girder bridges, each with two lanes and full-width shoulders. The bridges are located near milepost 74, about 30 miles (48 km) southwest of downtown Knoxville. The structures have a total length of 1,671.9 feet (509.6 m), and are each 42 feet (13 m) wide. The longest spans are 400 feet (120 m) long. The bridges reach a maximum height of 54.5 feet (16.6 m) above the navigation channel on the river.

The first contract for the bridge was awarded in March 1972, after multiple delays caused by redesigns. On November 21, 1972, two workers were killed and another injured when a 90-short-ton (82 t) section of a pier under construction fell into the river. The bridges opened on December 20, 1974, and were part of the last section of I-75 in Tennessee completed. Final deck sealing, however, was not yet complete due to cold weather, and was done in the spring of 1975; as a result, the bridges were initially restricted to two lanes. In 1978, the bridges were named for Mitchell W. Stout, a U.S. Army soldier from Knoxville who was posthumously awarded the Medal of Honor for his actions in the Vietnam War.

On March 28, 1994, a runaway barge that had broken loose from its mooring due to flooding struck the bridge, along with the US 11 bridge and a railroad bridge nearby. The collision broke a chunk of concrete loose from a pier, but engineers determined that it caused no major structural damage. I-75 had been closed to traffic on this section in preparation for the collision. On March 9, 2019, the bridge was again closed to traffic when a barge broke loose upstream and drifted towards the bridge. A tugboat was able to stop the barge about 600 to 800 feet (180 to 240 m) from the bridge, preventing a collision.

== See also ==
- List of crossings of the Tennessee River
