= Veterans Memorial Bridge (Chattanooga) =

Girder bridge in Tennessee, US

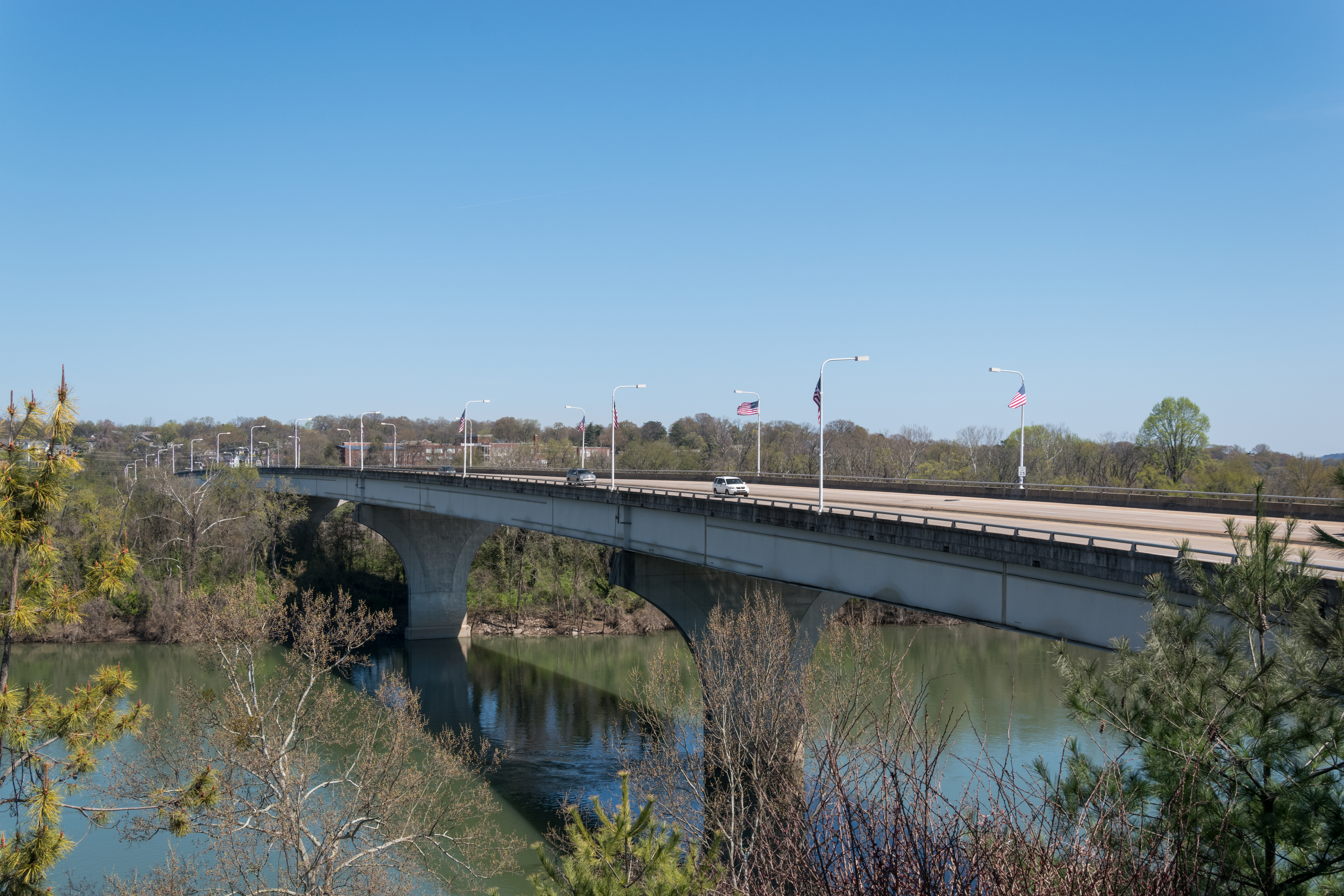
- Coordinates: 35.0570°N 85.3025°W
- Crosses: Tennessee River
- Preceded by: C.B. Robinson Bridge
- Followed by: Walnut Street Bridge

Characteristics
- Design: Girder bridge
- Material: Steel
- Longest span: 420 feet (130 m)

History
- Construction end: 1984

Location
- Interactive map of Veterans Memorial Bridge

The Veterans Memorial Bridge is a steel girder bridge in Chattanooga, Tennessee. It was built in 1984 and has a main span of 420 feet (130 m). It carries Georgia Avenue across the Tennessee River, and Audubon Island, an island in the river on which McClellan Animal Sanctuary is located. It is one of four bridges that cross the Tennessee River at downtown Chattanooga.

The Veterans Memorial Bridge was built with the intention to honor American veterans for their time and commitment to the country. The bridge is a testament of Chattanooga’s patriotism as well as the strength of the community when it is united. The Veterans Memorial Bridge helps tell the story of veterans by remaining strong and well kept by the community. The bridge also honors veterans by flying American flags, which are replaced twice a year. The flags were originally placed on the Veterans Memorial Bridge by an anonymous donor, who spent over $40,000 out of his own pocket every year to ensure the flags were replaced and in good condition. The flags represent the valor, bravery, and courage of the honored veterans. After the anonymous donor stopped replacing the flags, a local Chattanooga citizen, Scott McKenzie, arranged in 2013 for the flags to be sponsored by people in the community. Chattanoogans can honor individual veterans by donating a flag for the Veterans Memorial Bridge. Organizations of Chattanooga also participate in giving back to veterans by donating flags for the bridge.

== Contributions to the community ==
The Veterans Memorial Bridge is an important part of the Chattanooga community, participating in various events such as the Great Chattanooga Rubber Duck Race and the Girls Preparatory School’s 100th year celebration. The Great Chattanooga Rubber Duck Race is very similar to the Great Knoxville Rubber Duck Race. Both races are fundraisers for children’s clubs in the Tennessee area. The club that Chattanooga’s duck race is fundraising for is the Boys’ Club of Chattanooga, INC. During the Great Chattanooga Rubber Duck Race, portions of the Veterans Memorial Bridge are closed down to allow people to view the duck race from above. When the race is over, the sponsors are responsible for the area on the bridge that was closed; they must replace traffic control devices and clean up trash. Another event that the Veterans Memorial Bridge played an important part in was the Girls Preparatory School’s 100th birthday celebration during the 2005-2006 academic year. During the September 2005 celebration, the entire school marched across the Veterans Memorial Bridge to the school’s events, which included speakers and various videos. Like the duck race, part of the bridge was closed for the girls to travel safely across to the other side.

== Improvements from the community ==
In 2011, Mr. Dan Johnson purchased lights to exchange for the old ones on Veterans Memorial Bridge; the lights under the bridge are new lighting. The lights will be operated at 50% capacity and Police will have the ability to change the capacity from their computers.

== See also ==
- List of crossings of the Tennessee River
