= Marion Memorial Bridge =

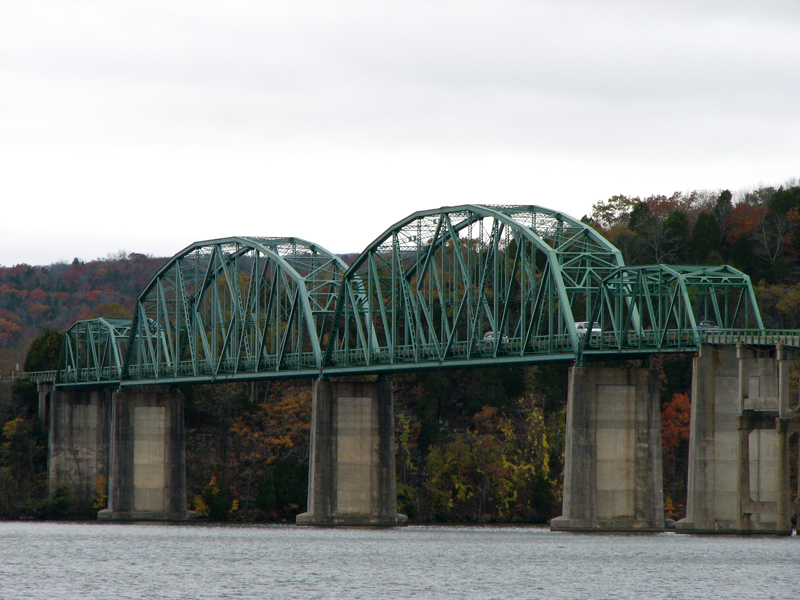
- Coordinates: 35.0280°N 85.5435°W
- Carries: US 41 / US 72
- Crosses: Tennessee River and Nickajack Lake

Characteristics
- Design: Truss bridge
- Total length: 1,870 feet (570 m)
- Longest span: 369 feet (112 m)

History
- Opened: 1929
- Closed: 2012, demolished 2015

Location
- Interactive map of Marion Memorial Bridge

The Marion Memorial Bridge was a 4-span metal truss bridge that formerly carried U.S. Route 41 in Marion County, Tennessee over the Tennessee River and Nickajack Lake. It was built in 1929. The main span was 369 feet (112 m), and the bridge had a total length of 1,870 feet (570 m). The bridge was listed on the National Register of Historic Places on October 25, 2007.

The bridge featured an unusual truss configuration that is a hybrid of the Parker and K-Truss configurations. The bridge was replaced by a new concrete and box girder span that opened in November 2014, slightly delayed from its target completion date of August 2013 by conditions encountered in the construction of the replacement bridge footings. Since the construction of the new bridge's footings involved blasting within 30 feet (9.1 m) of the Marion Memorial Bridge, state officials closed the bridge to vehicle and pedestrian traffic on January 9, 2012, with traffic being re-routed to the Holman J. Walker Bridge south of the span. The metal trusses of the bridge were demolished and removed by June 2015. The bridge was delisted from the National Register in June 2016. Some people in the community expressed the desire to preserve the bridge in some way. Tennessee Department of Transportation officials said the bridge was costly to maintain, citing as an example the repainting cost of $1 million.

This bridge was built before the construction Nickajack Dam, a few miles downriver. The higher mean pool of the new reservoir necessitated raising the bridge from its original height, which took place shortly after the dam's completion in December 1967.

A bridge of similar design in Meigs County, Tennessee, that carried Tennessee Highway 58 across the Hiwassee River was imploded in November 2007, along with another similar bridge that carried Highway 58 over the Tennessee River in Roane County.
