= Market Street Bridge (Chattanooga) =

Bridge over the Tennessee River in Chattanooga, Tennessee

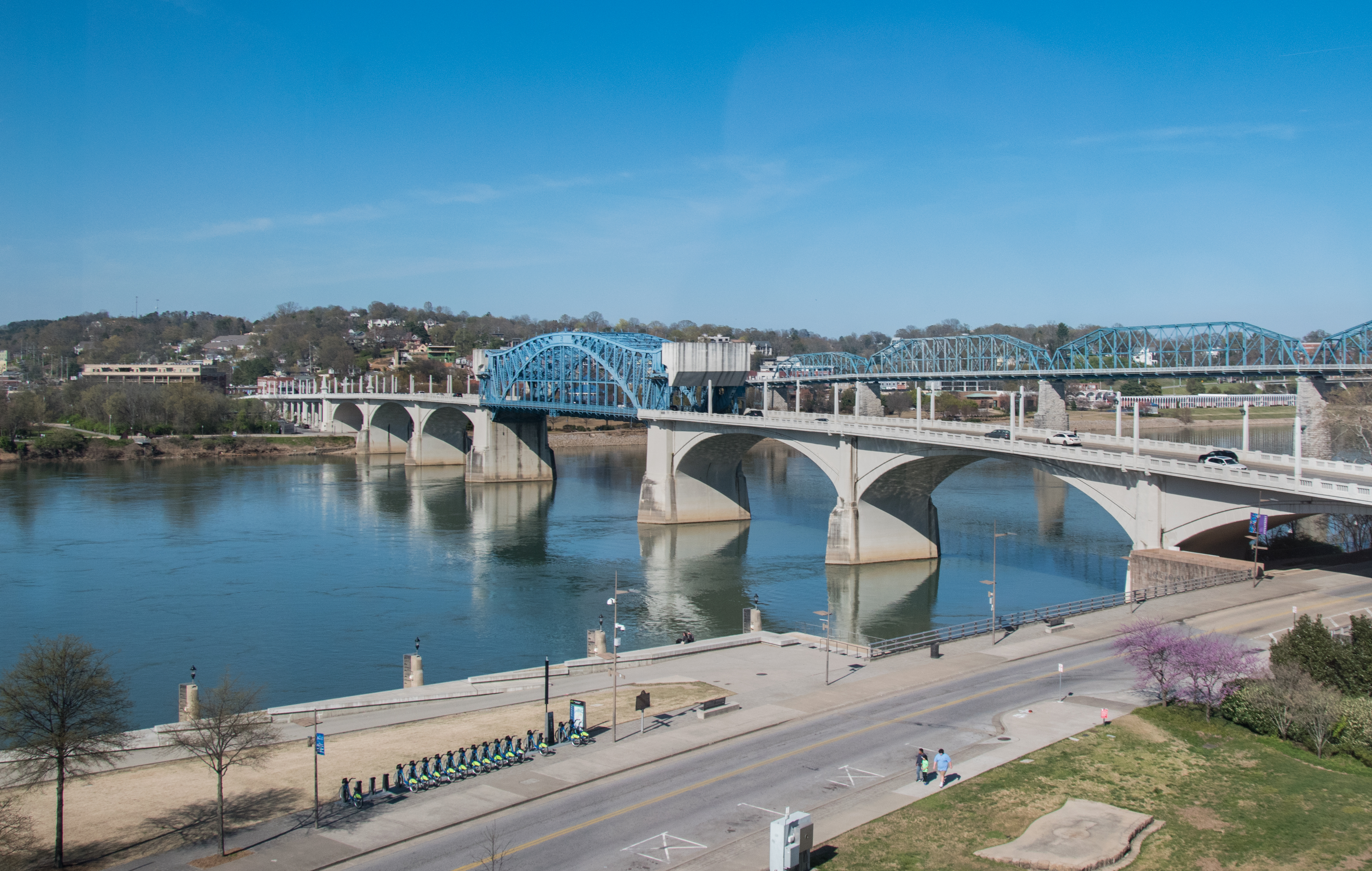
- Coordinates: 35°03′32″N 85°18′32″W
- Carries: 4 lanes of North Market Street
- Crosses: Tennessee River
- Locale: Chattanooga, Tennessee
- Official name: Chief John Ross Bridge

Characteristics
- Design: Double-leaf bascule bridge
- Total length: 1,894.5 ft (577.4 m)
- Width: 36 ft (11 m)
- Longest span: 358.8 ft (109 m)

History
- Opened: 1917
- Market Street Bridge
- U.S. National Register of Historic Places
- Coordinates: 35°3′31″N 85°18′33″W
- NRHP reference No.: 10001047
- Added to NRHP: December 20, 2010

Location
- Interactive map of Market Street Bridge

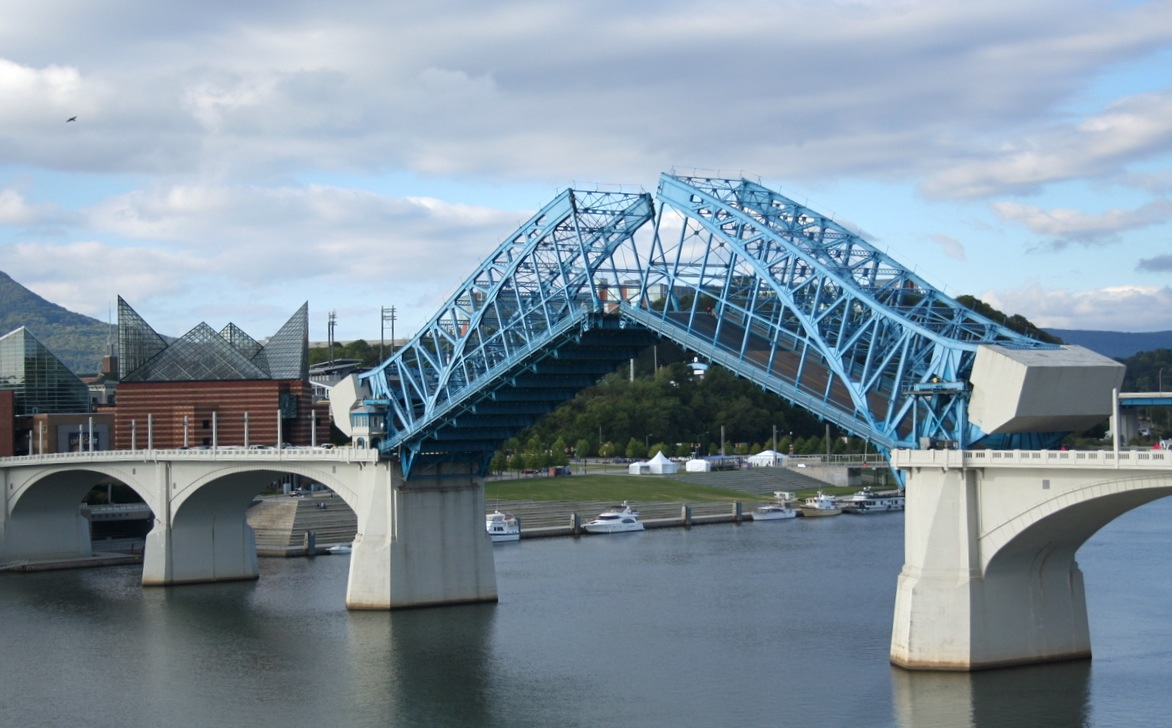
The bridge's bascule span open

The Market Street Bridge, officially referred to as the John Ross Bridge, is a bascule bridge that spans the Tennessee River between downtown Chattanooga, Tennessee, and the Northshore District. It carries North Market Street (formerly designated as U.S. Route 127), and was named in honor of Cherokee Chief John Ross. The bridge was completed in 1917 at a cost of $1.1 million. In the mid-1970s, the southern terminus of US 127 was moved several miles north to the intersection of Dayton Boulevard and Signal Mountain Boulevard in the nearby suburb of Red Bank.

The bridge has concrete arch spans flanking a center draw span, which is a steel truss with double-leaf Scherzer rolling lift bascule mechanism. The double-leaf bascule lift span stands approximately 70 feet above the water. At the time of its completion in 1917, the 300-foot (91 m) main span was the longest rolling-lift bascule span in the world. Vehicular traffic originally included streetcars, but streetcar service across the bridge ended in the 1930s. The bridge was formally renamed the Chief John Ross Bridge in 1950.

The bridge closed in 2005 for a renovation, but reopened on August 4, 2007, ahead of its originally scheduled September completion date.

The bridge was listed on the National Register of Historic Places on December 20, 2010.

Four times per year, the bridge is closed for a brief inspection to test its hinge mechanism, as mandated by the US Coast Guard.

== See also ==
- List of crossings of the Tennessee River
