= P.R. Olgiati =

55th Mayor of Chattanooga, Tennessee from 1951 to 1963

Peter Rudolph Olgiati
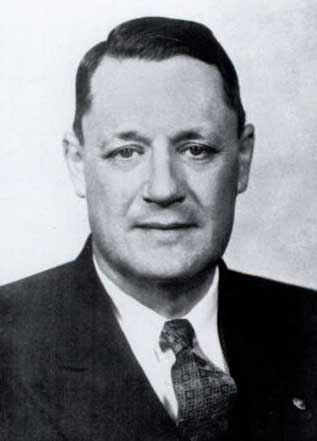

Mayor of Chattanooga, Tennessee
- In office April 16, 1951 – April 15, 1963
- Preceded by: Hugh Wasson
- Succeeded by: Ralph H. Kelley

Personal details
- Born: August 24, 1901 Grundy County, Tennessee, U.S.
- Died: August 6, 1989 (aged 87)
- Resting place: Forest Hills Cemetery; Chattanooga, Tennessee
- Party: Democratic

Military service
- Branch/service: United States Army Corps of Engineers
- Years of service: Discharged 1945
- Rank: Major

Peter Rudolph "Rudy" Olgiati (August 24, 1901 – August 6, 1989) was the 55th Mayor of Chattanooga, Tennessee from 1951 to 1963. During his time in office, Olgiati oversaw the arrival of the interstate highway, the beginning of the Civil Rights Movement, and the city's first urban renewal project. He is often accused of being one of Chattanooga's last political bosses. He is also the namesake of Chattanooga's P.R. Olgiati Bridge.

== Early life ==
Born Peter Rudolph Olgiati in Gruelti (now part of Gruetli-Laager), Grundy County, Tennessee, he was a first-generation American, his mother being from Switzerland and father being Spanish. After his father's death, Olgiati moved to the Alton Park neighborhood of Chattanooga at the age of 6 with his mother. Olgiati briefly attended the Chicago Technical Institute before going to work at the Chattanooga Glass Company. He then moved on to a career in construction as a bricklayer, later working his way up to the position of superintendent. In the 1930s, Olgiati moved his way into the public-sector, joining Chattanooga's City Utilities Department and becoming the superintendent of Chattanooga's Warner Park. After the outbreak of World War II, Olgiati used his construction knowledge and leadership skills in the US Army Corps of Engineers. Over the duration of his military service he became a major before being discharged at the war's end in 1945.

In 1946, Olgiati took his first public office after being appointed to fill an unexpired term as Commissioner of Chattanooga's Department of Public Service, or "Streets and Sewers." In 1947, Olgiati ran for the same position and won a full term as Commissioner. Four years later, in 1951, he ran against incumbent Mayor of Chattanooga, Hugh Wasson, and won. Olgiati then served 4 terms over a total of 12 years, becoming one of Chattanooga's longest serving mayors.

== Mayoralty ==
P.R. Olgiati served as Mayor of Chattanooga for 4 terms from 1951 to 1963. During his time in office he oversaw a massive infrastructure program, much of Chattanooga's Civil Rights Movement, and was accused of partaking in political bossism. He ran in the race for the Democratic Nomination for Governor of Tennessee in 1962, but lost to the incumbent Buford Ellington. He lost the 1963 election for Mayor of Chattanooga as well. Olgiati is often remembered as one of Chattanooga's best mayors.

=== Infrastructure ===
In his first term as Mayor, Olgiati announced his planned "Program of Progress," which would request $100 million in federal grants for the creation and revitalization of Chattanooga infrastructure. His request was granted, and he oversaw the modernization of many aspects of Chattanooga. Olgiati was later quoted saying, "There was a lot of opposition to everything that was done because it was new to Chattanooga... We had a lot of pig trails and narrow streets, slums, you name it. Something had to happen." Coming from the Department of Streets and Sewers, Olgiati began a $170 million project to modernize the city's sewer systems. He also oversaw the widening of several downtown roads, conversion of many streets to one-way to help with traffic flow, and the building of a second tunnel through Missionary Ridge. The "Program of Progress" was also responsible for the modernization and expansion of Chattanooga's Lovell Field airport, which Olgiati called, "one of the best in the South." Olgiati's program also began the 20-year project of removing rail lines from downtown Chattanooga.

One of Olgiati's biggest infrastructure accomplishments was the introduction of the Interstate Freeway System to Chattanooga. Due to his efforts, Chattanooga became the first city in Tennessee to have a completed interstate. Olgiati stressed the fact that Chattanooga was a perfect point for connecting the cities of Atlanta, Nashville, Knoxville, and Birmingham.

==== The Golden Gateway Renewal Project ====
During his first term, Olgiati used the federal funding from his "Program of Progress" to fund his most ambitious and controversial infrastructure project, the Golden Gateway Renewal Project. Since 1949, there had been discussion about adding another, much needed, bridge across the Tennessee River. This planned bridge was usually referred to as the "Cedar Street Bridge." Engineers determined that its construction could be accomplished through the removal of the top portion of a local landmark, Cameron Hill. The hill was the site of many Pre-Civil War Antebellum mansions, but had since fallen into a slum-ridden decay. Going against the wishes of many local historians, traditionalists, and prominent families, Olgiati used his Golden Gateway Renewal Project to remove the top portion of the ridge to create a bridge. The project removed the top 100 feet of Cameron Hill and displaced 1400 families. The resulting bridge was of a modern steel-girder construction and spanned four lanes. After its completion in 1959, it was named the P.R. Olgiati Bridge after the Mayor.

=== Civil rights ===
In the 1950s, Chattanooga was similar to many Southern cities, being segregated with racial tensions running high. This was especially important to Olgiati, as he had used a large percentage of the black vote to get elected. On February 19, 1960, tensions reached a near boiling point when 30 students from the all-black Howard High School participated in a sit-in protest at a local segregated lunch counter. Soon, white students from area high schools came to harass and attack the black protesters. Faced with the threat of a riot, Olgiati decided to send in the fire department to disperse the students. This marked the first time fire hoses were used as a means to combat civil rights protesters in a Southern city. The hose would later become a symbol of the opposition the protesters faced. Claiming to have ordered the fire department to focus indiscriminately on both the black and white students, Olgiati later stated, "Everybody got wet. I got wet too. But it broke it up, see."

Olgiati also oversaw the desegregation of local schools. Aiming to oversee a peaceful and stable integration, he created a "'Citizens' Committee' whose responsibility [was] in the direction of mobilizing community-wide support for the maintenance of law and order." He also issued a public statement that stated "violence hurts us all" and "Chattanooga is a city that respects the law."
