= Nickajack Lake =

Lake in Tennessee, U.S.

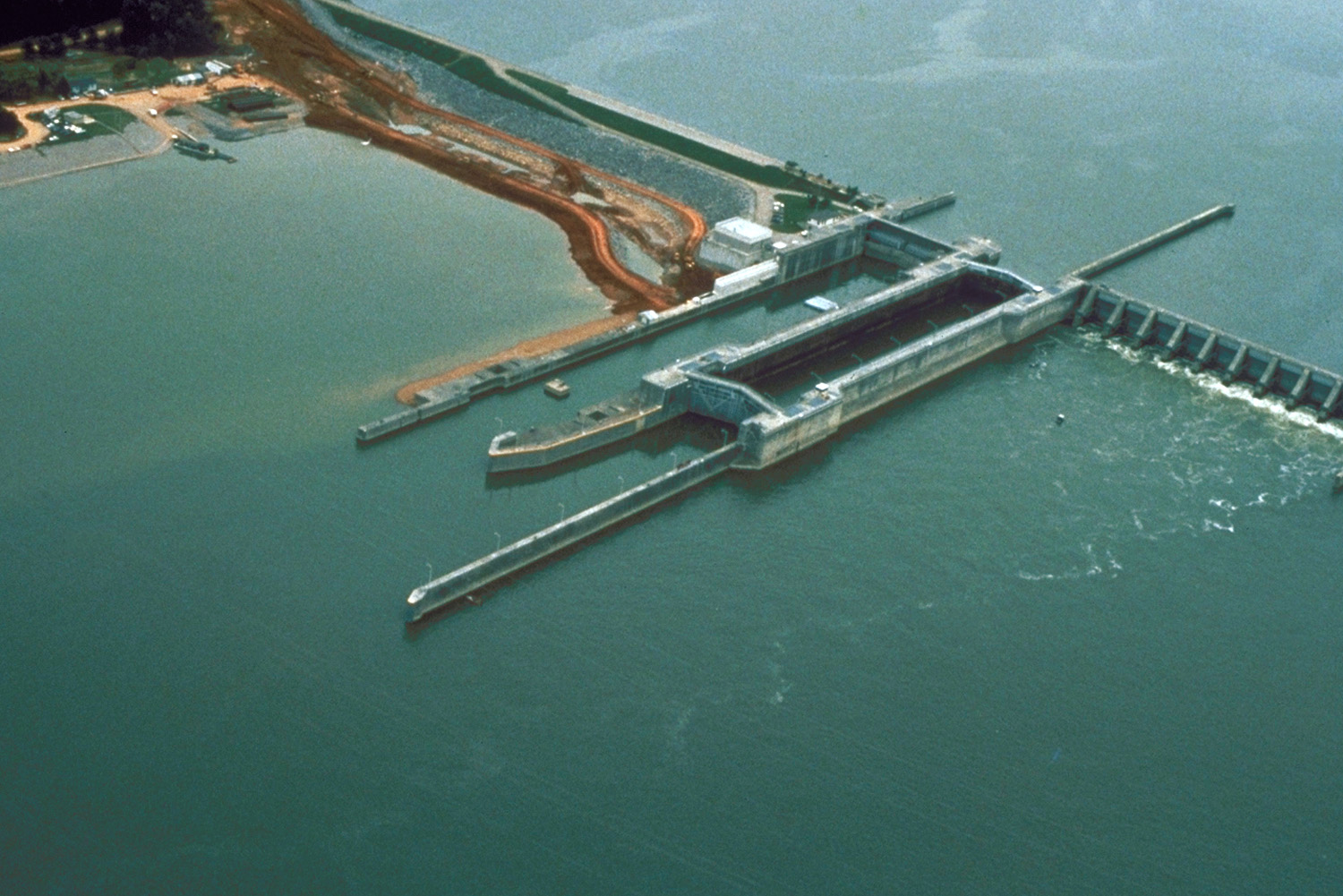
- Nickajack Lock and Dam

- Location within Tennessee Location within the United States
- Location: Marion / Hamilton counties, Tennessee
- Coordinates: 35°00′15″N 085°37′10″W
- Type: reservoir
- Primary inflows: Tennessee River
- Primary outflows: Tennessee River
- Basin countries: United States
- Max. depth: 145 ft (44 m)
- Surface elevation: 633.5 ft (193.1 m)

Nickajack Lake is the reservoir created by Nickajack Dam as part of the Tennessee Valley Authority. The lake stretches from Nickajack Dam to Chickamauga Dam, passing through the city of Chattanooga. The Tennessee River Gorge, commonly referred to as the "Grand Canyon of Tennessee", is also part of Nickajack Lake.

Full pool for Nickajack Lake is approximately 633.5 feet (193.1 m) above sea level, and remains consistent during the course of the year, unlike nearby Chickamauga Lake.

The world record for freshwater drum was caught from Nickajack Lake in 1972 by Benny Hull, and weighed in at 54 pounds 8 ounces (24.7 kg).

A lake sturgeon was caught in Nickajack Lake in 2011. This was the first sighting of one in the lake since they left the area in the 1960s.

== See also ==
- Nickajack
- Dams and reservoirs of the Tennessee River
