= Nickajack Dam =

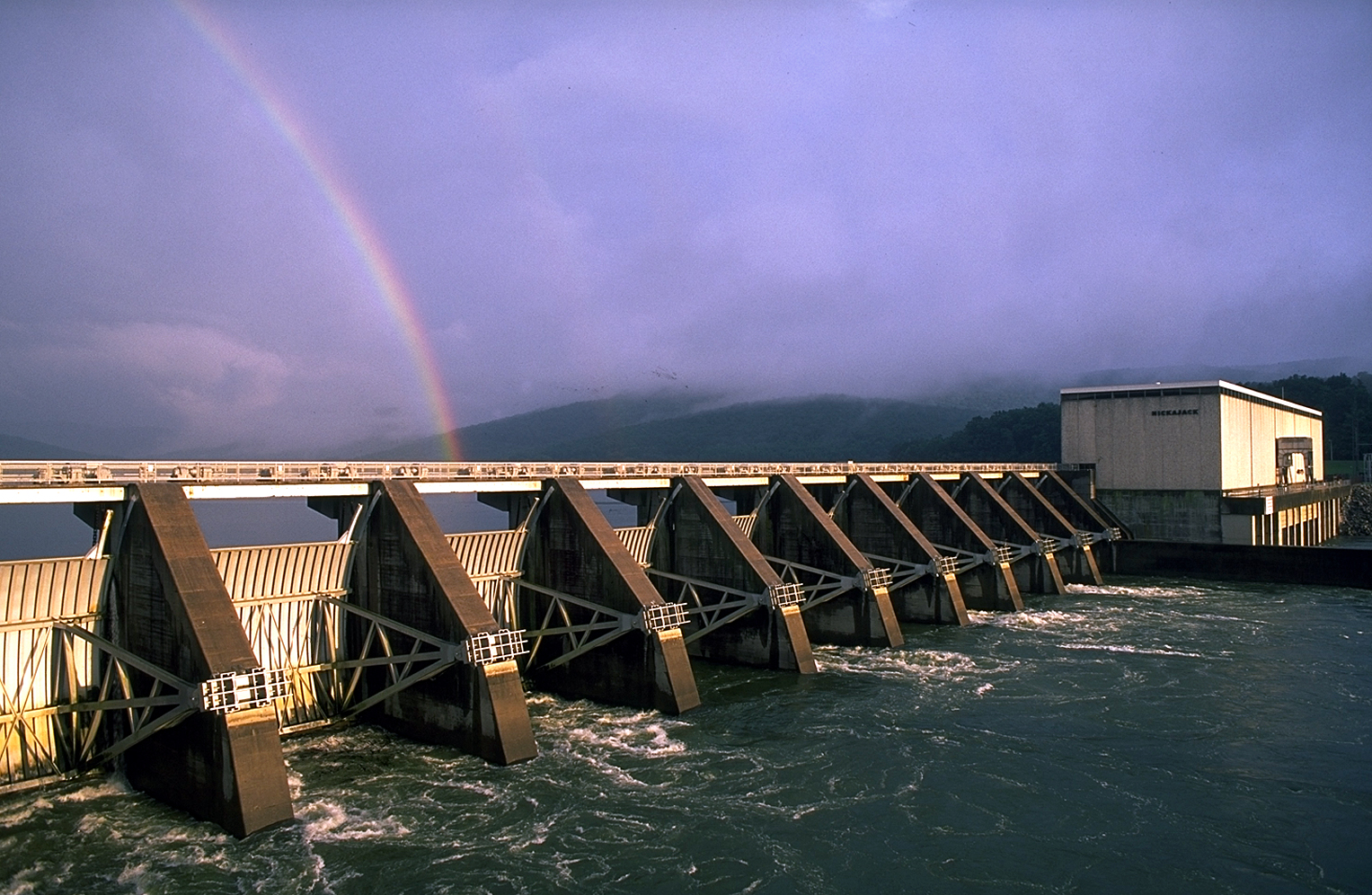
- The upstream side of Nickajack Dam
- Interactive map of Nickajack Dam
- Official name: Nickajack Dam
- Country: United States
- Location: Marion County, Tennessee
- Coordinates: 35°00′15″N 85°37′10″W
- Construction began: April 1, 1964
- Opening date: December 14, 1967
- Operator: Tennessee Valley Authority

Dam and spillways
- Impounds: Tennessee River
- Height: 81 ft (25 m)
- Length: 3,767 ft (1,148 m)

Reservoir
- Creates: Nickajack Lake
- Surface area: 10,370 acres (42.0 km^{2})
- Normal elevation: 633.5 ft (193.1 m)

Nickajack Dam is a hydroelectric dam in Marion County in the U.S. state of Tennessee. It is one of nine dams on the Tennessee River owned and operated by the Tennessee Valley Authority, which built the dam in the mid-1960s to replace the outdated Hales Bar Dam 6 miles (9.7 km) upstream. The dam impounds the 10,370-acre (4,200 ha) Nickajack Lake and feeds into Guntersville Lake. Nickajack Dam is named for a Cherokee village once located just upstream from the dam (the site is now submerged). The village was the namesake for Nickajack Cave, which was partially flooded by the reservoir.

== Location ==
Nickajack Dam is located 424 miles (682 km) above the mouth of the Tennessee River, near the point where the states of Tennessee, Georgia, and Alabama meet. This stretch of the river marks a region where the river begins to exit the once treacherous Tennessee River Gorge en route to the flatlands around Guntersville, Alabama. The Sequatchie River empties into the dam's tailwaters, and the city of South Pittsburg is just over 5 miles (8.0 km) downstream from the dam. Nickajack Lake stretches northeast for over 46 miles (74 km), all the way to the base of Chickamauga Dam in Chattanooga. Tennessee State Highway 156 passes just south of Nickajack Dam, and Interstate 24 passes a few miles to the north.

== Capacity ==
Nickajack Dam is 81 feet (25 m) high and 3,767 feet (1,148 m) wide. Its reservoir has 179 miles (288 km) of shoreline and 10,370 acres (4,200 ha) of water surface. The dam's 10 spillway bays have a combined discharge of 360,000 cubic feet per second (10,000 m^{3}/s). The electrical generating capacity of Nickajack is 104 megawatts.

Nickajack is serviced by a 600-by-110-foot (183 by 34 m) auxiliary lock that can lift or lower as many as nine large barges at a time 41 feet (12 m) between Guntersville Lake and Nickajack Lake. The dam's original design allowed for an 800-by-110-foot (244 by 34 m) main lock beside the auxiliary, but it was never completed. This lock, as well as every lock on the Tennessee River, is operated and maintained by the U.S. Army Corps of Engineers.

== Background and construction ==
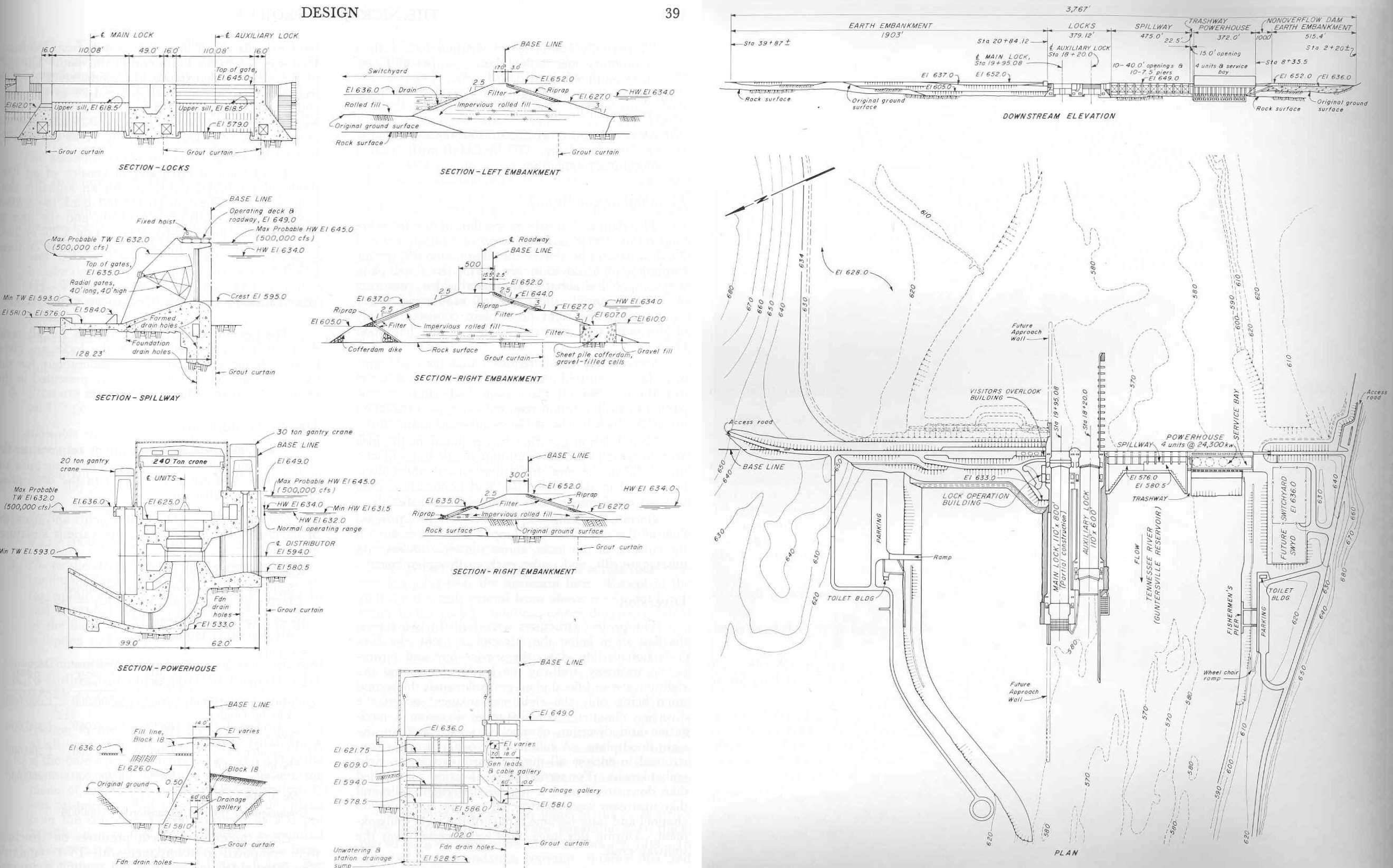
TVA's design plan for Nickajack Dam, circa 1964

Before the completion of Hales Bar Dam in 1913, the Tennessee River Gorge was one of the major impediments—along with Muscle Shoals and the Elk River shoals—to year-round navigation on the Tennessee River. Along with unpredictable water levels, the gorge was filled with numerous water hazards, some of which had been given nicknames such as "The Suck", "The Skillet", and "The Pan." In the early 1900s, the U.S. Army Corps of Engineers realized that a dam near the southwestern end of the gorge would flood the water hazards and eliminate the gorge's rapid downstream current. Chattanooga engineer Josephus Conn Guild offered to raise funds to build this dam in exchange for rights to the dam's electrical output. After receiving authorization from Congress in 1904, he organized the Chattanooga and Tennessee River Power Company (later TEPCO) in 1905, and the company began building Hales Bar Dam in October of that year. Hales Bar's weak limestone foundation—which hadn't been considered in the selection of the dam site—presented numerous obstacles from the outset, but the dam was finally completed in 1913.

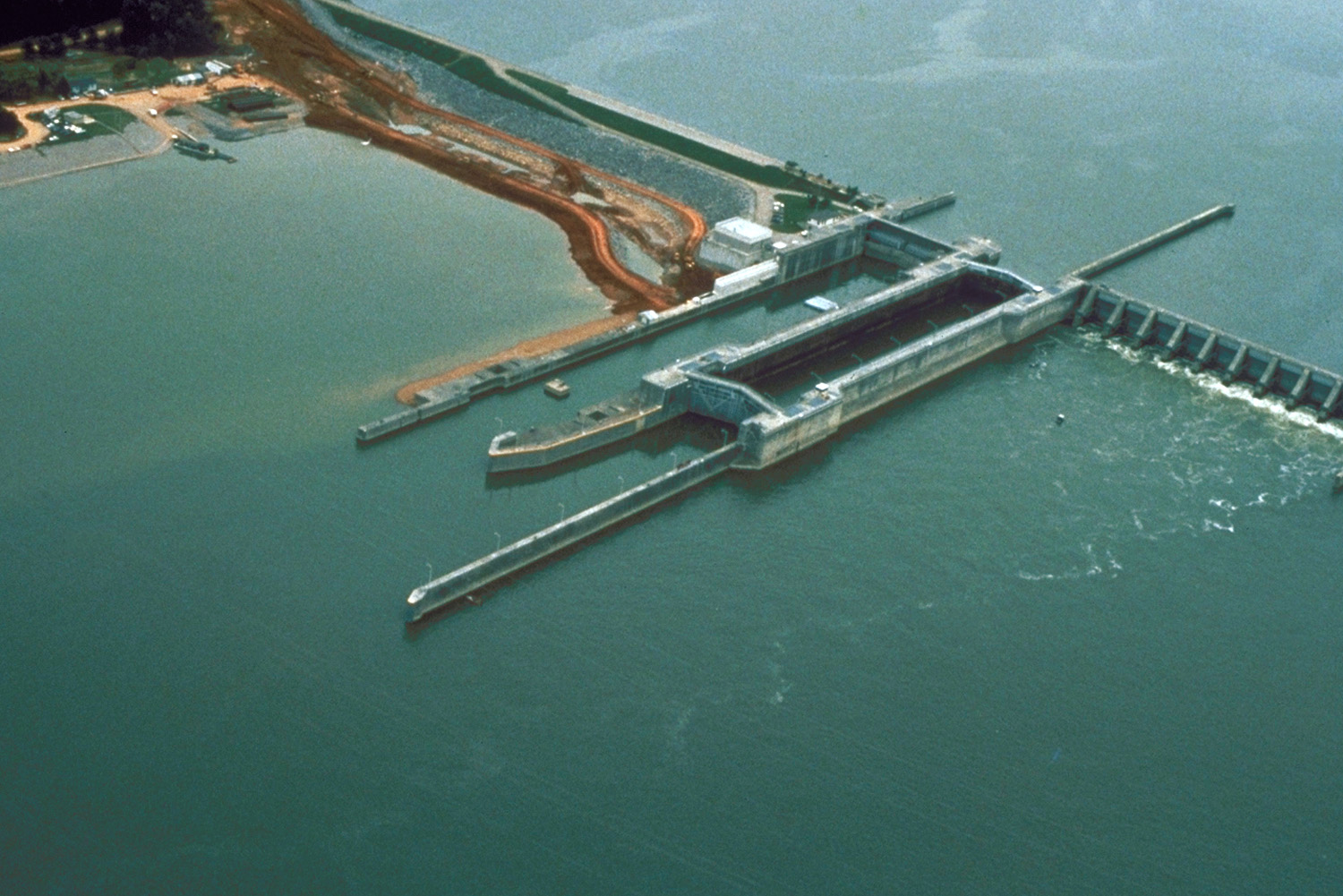
Aerial view of Nickajack's lock

In 1939, after a contentious court battle, TEPCO was forced to sell its assets—including Hales Bar Dam—to the Tennessee Valley Authority. The dam had been leaking since its construction, and TVA immediately initiated a series of foundation improvements that by 1943 had succeeded in halting the leaks. In 1960, however, the leaks had returned, spilling at an alarming 2,000 cubic feet per second (57 m^{3}/s). Around the same time, TVA began expanding locks on its dams to at least 600 feet (180 m) to accommodate the increase in traffic the river had experienced since World War II, and it was determined that expanding the Hales Bar lock would be "prohibitively" expensive. Rather than upgrading Hales Bar, a decision was made in 1963 to build a new dam altogether on a more solid bedrock a few miles downstream.

The Nickajack Dam project was authorized January 9, 1964, and construction began April 1, 1964. Funding set aside for repair work on Hales Bar was transferred to the Nickajack project. The reservoir's construction—which basically involved extending the Hales Bar Reservoir 6 miles (9.7 km) downstream to Nickajack—required the purchase of 8,300 acres (3,400 ha), 500 acres (200 ha) of which had to be cleared. 82 families and 8 miles (13 km) of roads had to be relocated. Two generators and several switchyard parts were moved from Hales Bar Dam to the new dam. Construction was completed on December 14, 1967, at a cost of $73 million (equivalent to $523 million in 2024). Operations at Hales Bar Dam were halted the following day, and by September 1968, Hales Bar Dam had been dismantled and its reservoir merged with Nickajack Lake.

== See also ==
- Nickajack
- Hales Bar Dam
- Dams and reservoirs of the Tennessee River
