= U.S. Route 64 in Tennessee =

Segment of American highway

U.S. Route 64
- Route of US 64 highlighted in red

Route information
- Maintained by TDOT
- Length: 404.1 mi (650.3 km)
- Existed: November 11, 1926–present

Major junctions
- West end: I-55 / US 61 / US 64 / US 70 / US 78 / US 79 at Arkansas state line in Memphis
- I-40 / I-55 / I-240 in Memphis; I-269 in Eads; US 45 in Selmer; I-65 in Frankewing; US 231 / US 431 in Fayetteville; I-24 from Pelham to Kimball; I-24 in Chattanooga; I-75 from Chattanooga to Ooltewah
- East end: US 64 / US 74 at North Carolina state line near Ducktown

Location
- Country: United States
- State: Tennessee
- Counties: Shelby, Fayette, Hardeman, McNairy, Hardin, Wayne, Lawrence, Giles, Lincoln, Franklin, Coffee, Grundy, Marion, Hamilton, Bradley, Polk

Highway system
- United States Numbered Highway System; List; Special; Divided; Tennessee State Routes; Interstate; US; State
← SR 63	→ SR 64
← I-40	SR 40	→ US 41
← SR 431	SR 433	→ SR 434

In Tennessee, U.S. Route 64 (US 64) stretches 404.1 miles (650.3 km) from the Mississippi River at the Arkansas state line in Memphis to the North Carolina state line near Ducktown. US 64 is the major east-west transportation corridor across the southern part of Tennessee, entering the state in Memphis, the second largest city in Tennessee, and passing through the fourth-largest city of Chattanooga in the east. The highway also serves several smaller towns in between. US 64 passes through the state's three Grand Divisions. Most of US 64 in Tennessee has been expanded to four lanes, and is part of the National Highway System. West of Chattanooga, US 64 crosses the Cumberland Plateau concurrent with I-24 on a section of highway known as Monteagle Mountain. This section features steep grades, and is considered one of the most dangerous stretches of the Interstate Highway System. The eastern section between Cleveland and the North Carolina state line is part of Corridor K of the Appalachian Development Highway System. In East Tennessee, US 64 also features multiple scenic routes, including the Tennessee River Gorge along the Tennessee River through the Cumberland Plateau and the Ocoee Scenic Byway, a National Forest Scenic Byway along the Ocoee River through the Blue Ridge Mountains.

US 64 evolved from a series of Native American trails that were later used by European American settlers. Another predecessor was the Old Copper Road, constructed in the eastern part of the state between 1851 and 1853 to transport mined copper from the Copper Basin region. US 64 was established in Tennessee with the United States Numbered Highway System in 1926, and quickly became a major transportation corridor. Parts of the Old Copper Road section were improved with funding from the Appalachian Regional Development Act of 1965. This legislation also proposed expanding the section through the Blue Ridge Mountains to a four-lane highway, but this has faced extensive opposition related to cost and environmental concerns. In the later part of the 20th century, the state conducted studies that showed the need for a modern transportation corridor across the southern rural counties in Tennessee. Planning began in 1980, and in 1986, initial funds were allocated to begin widening the section between Memphis and I-24 west of Chattanooga to a four-lane highway as part of a major road funding effort by the Tennessee General Assembly. The project was completed in 2017 at a cost of approximately $1.26 billion. Other major projects include safety improvements in the mountainous stretches and initiatives to relieve congestion in urban areas.

== Route description ==
=== Memphis and Shelby County ===
Map showing the route of US 64 in downtown Memphis.

US 64 enters Tennessee on the Memphis & Arkansas Bridge in Memphis. The route shares the bridge with Interstate 55 (I-55) and US 61, US 70, US 78, and US 79. Immediately east of the bridge, the routes split off onto Crump Boulevard, a four-lane surface street with a center turn lane. A few blocks later, the highway turns north onto B. B. King Boulevard, where US 61 splits off to the south as Third Street, and US 78 continues to the east. The road briefly shrinks to two lanes under a railroad underpass, before entering downtown and splitting into a one-way pair of three-lane streets. US 64/70/79 then turn east onto Union Avenue and have an interchange with US 51 (Danny Thomas Boulevard) a short distance beyond, beginning a concurrency with this road. A short distance beyond this is an interchange with I-240. Passing through a commercial area, US 51 splits off to the south as Bellevue Boulevard, and the road expands to a six-lane surface boulevard a few blocks beyond this. After a short distance, the US routes turn north onto North Parkway, part of the Memphis Parkway System, at an interchange with this road.

Continuing north as a four lane divided highway, the highways meet the western terminus of US 72 (Poplar Avenue) a short distance beyond. The road then passes along the eastern boundary of Overton Park, and intersects the western terminus of Sam Cooper Boulevard, before turning east onto Summer Avenue, a four-lane boulevard with a center turn lane. Passing through a predominately residential area lined with commercial establishments, the road expands to six lanes after several blocks, before reaching a partial interchange with I-40 and reducing two four lanes. Here only the westbound lanes of I-40 connect to US 64/70/79, and the eastbound access is via White Station Road. The highway then turns northeast and crosses the Wolf River. The highway passes through suburban neighborhoods of eastern Shelby County on the edge of Bartlett. A few miles later, US 64 turns east at an intersection with SR 15 (Stage Road), beginning an unsigned concurrency with this road. Here, US 70/79 continue to the northeast, and US 64 proceeds east as a six-lane highway. Passing along the edge of Germantown, US 64 intersects SR 177 (Germantown Parkway), a major north-south thoroughfare, before reaching an interchange with I-40 once again. Continuing through additional neighborhoods, the highway reduces back to four lanes a short distance later, before entering a less developed area. Several miles later is an interchange with I-269, a partial outer beltway around Memphis, and US 64 enters Fayette County immediately beyond.

=== Southwest Tennessee and Gulf Coastal Plain ===
Upon entering Fayette County, US 64 becomes a divided four-lane highway, with the center turn lane ending. US 64 then passes through Hickory Withe and has a junction with SR 196. They then enter Oakland and have an intersection with SR 194, before continuing east. They continue through rural farmland, passing by Glengary Lake. US 64 then enter Somerville and have an intersection with SR 76 in downtown. They then pass through Laconia, where they cross over the Loosahatchie River, before crossing into Hardeman County.

They then enter Whiteville, where US 64 Business (US 64 Bus) begins and goes east through downtown while US 64 follows a new bypass to the south. It also junctions with SR 179. The highway then meets up with the other end of US 64 Bus and goes east to have an intersection with SR 100, before US 64 leaves Whitville and continues southeast. It then enters Bolivar and becomes concurrent with SR 18. The highways then enter downtown and have a junction with SR 125, with SR 18 splitting off and going north along that highway. US 64 then leaves Bolivar and continues east. The higheay goes through some wooded areas, where it crosses the Hatchie River, and passes through Hornsby before crossing into McNairy County.

They then intersect SR 225 before going through some rural wooded areas and then entering Selmer, at an interchange with US 45/SR 5, which US 64 follows as a new bypass to the south while SR 15 goes through downtown, signed as US 64 Bus. SR 15 then goes east through downtown and comes to another junction with US 45/US 64/SR 5, with the road continuing east as US 45/SR 5 and SR 15 joins US 64 again, and they go northeast. US 64/SR 15 then intersect and have a short concurrency with SR 224 just north of Stantonville before entering Adamsville. In Adamsville, they have an intersection with SR 22 and SR 117 in the center of town, with SR 22 joining the concurrency. US 64/SR 15/SR 22 then leave Adamsville and cross into Hardin County. They then enter Crump and have an intersection and become concurrent with SR 69. A short distance later, SR 22 branches off and turns south. They then run along the banks of the Tennessee River before crossing it and entering Savannah.

=== Southern Middle Tennessee and Highland Rim ===
Upon crossing the river, US 64 immediately enters downtown Savannah and passes by the Tennessee River Museum, becoming concurrent with SR 128 before coming to an intersection with SR 203, where SR 69 turns south, SR 203 goes east, and US 64/SR 15/SR 128 go northeast to leave Savannah. They then intersect SR 226 before north of Olivet before SR 128 splits off and goes north. US 64/SR 15 then go through some mountains and pass through Olivehill before crossing into Wayne County.

They enter Clifton Junction where they intersect US 641/SR 114. US 64/SR 15 then go through a narrow valley before entering Waynesboro, bypassing the city to the west and north. It then has an interchange with SR 13 and crosses over the Green River before going east to intersect with SR 99. US 64/SR 15 then leave Waynesboro and continue east through mountainous terrain. They then enter some farmland and have an interchange with the Natchez Trace Parkway just before crossing into Lawrence County.

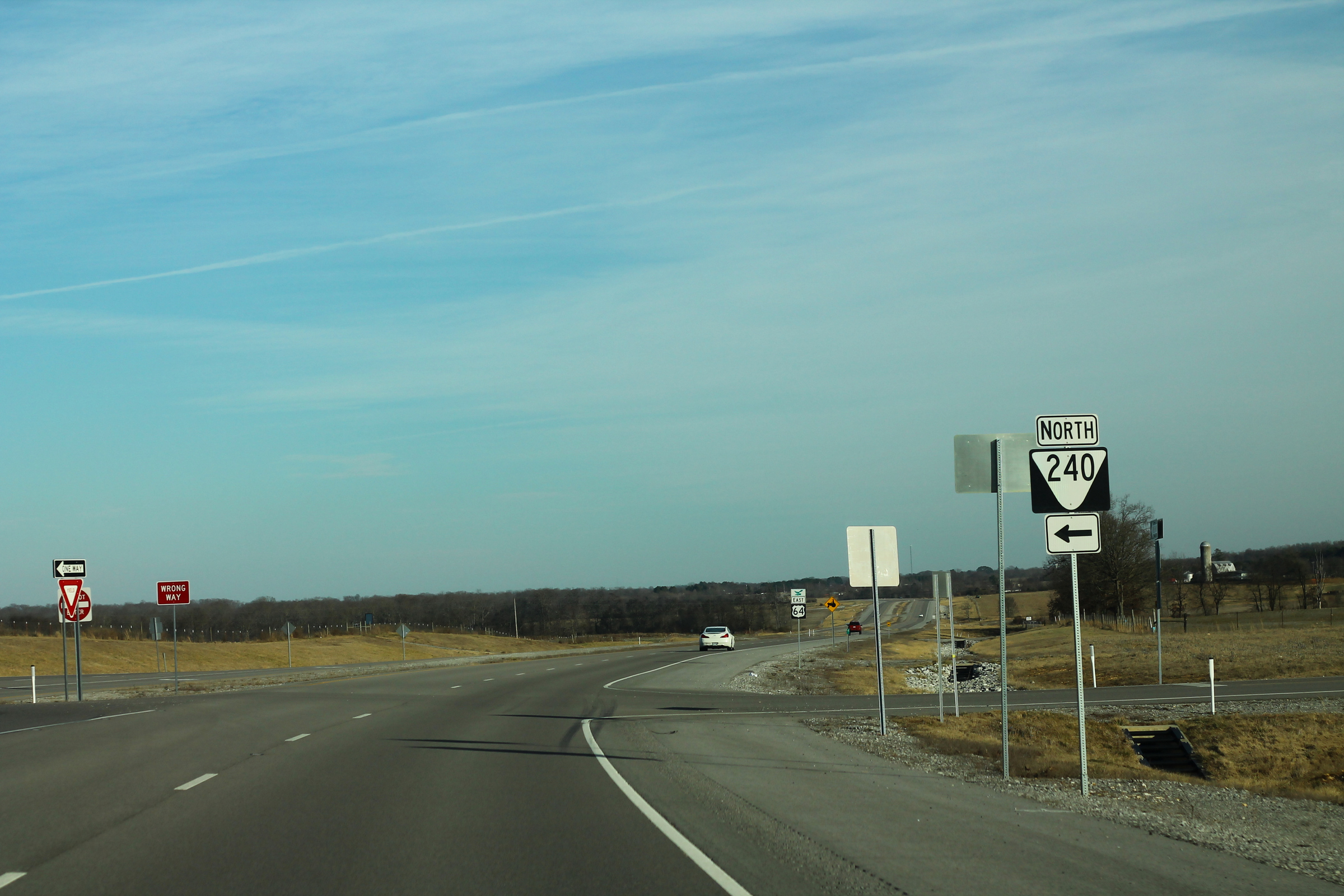
US 64 between Waynesboro and Lawrenceburg

They then intersect with SR 240 in Deerfield and then SR 241 just a little further to the east. They then enter Lawrenceburg. Just west of downtown, US 64 Bus begins and goes east into downtown, while US 64/SR 15 follow a new bypass to the south. They then have an interchange with SR 242 and cross over Shoal Creek, just south of New Shoal Creek Dam, shortly thereafter. They then have an interchange with US 43/SR 6 before passing through largely rural areas. They then come back around to meet the other end of US 64 Bus before leaving Lawrenceburg and continuing east through more mountains. US 64/SR 15 then cross into Giles County.

It then passes through Bodenham before intersecting and becoming concurrent with SR 166 and entering Pulaski. US 64 then bypasses the city to the south with SR 15/SR 166 going into downtown. SR 166 splits and turns south at an intersection with SR 11, with SR 11 becoming concurrent with SR 15. They then come to an intersection with US 31/SR 7, where SR 11 splits off and goes north along that highway. SR 15 then goes east back to US 64, where they continue east together. They go through some more mountains before coming to an interchange with I-65 (Exit 14) in Frankewing. US 64/SR 15 then cross into Lincoln County.

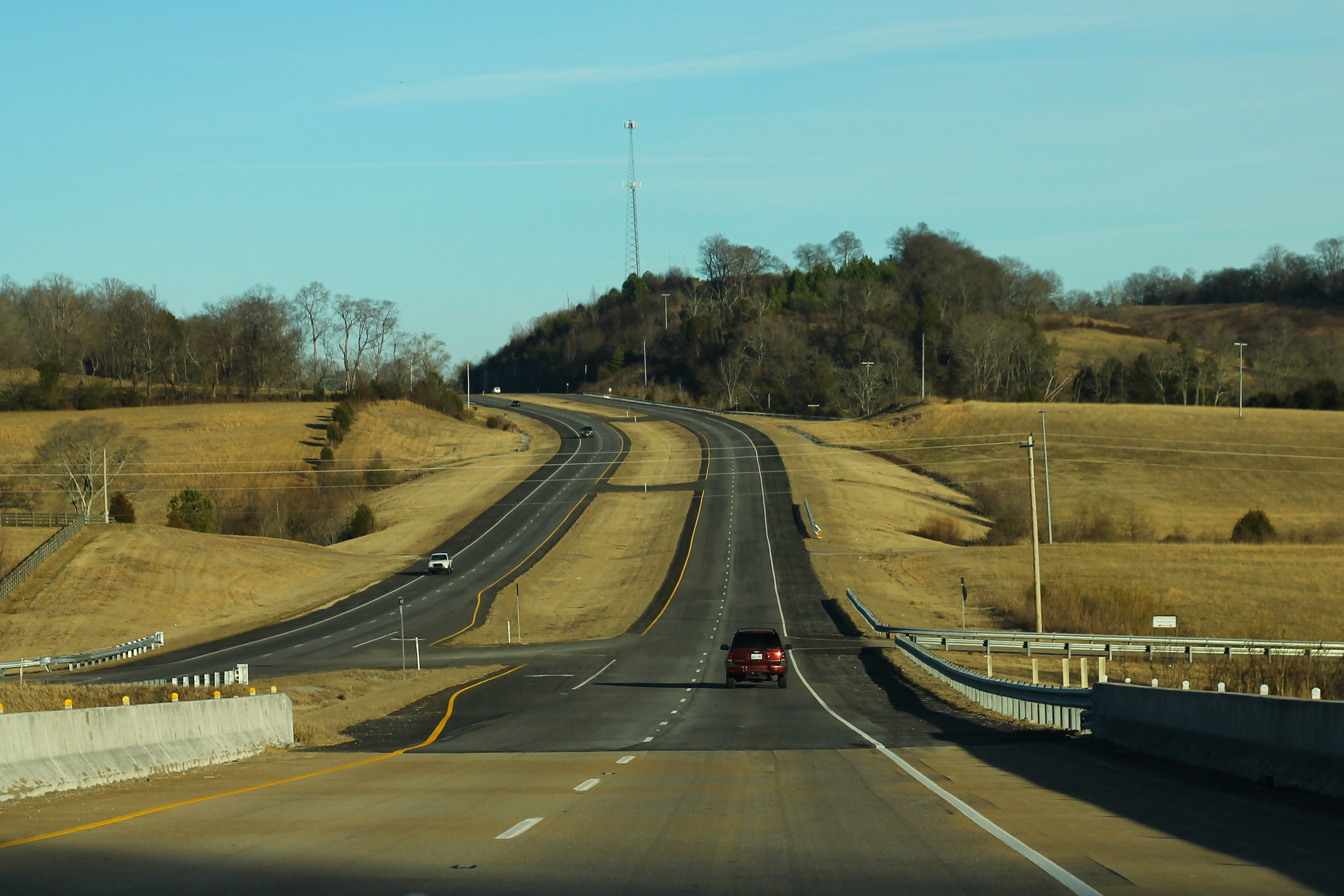
US 64 east of Pulaski

They then pass through Boonshill and intersect with SR 244. They then intersect with SR 273 before entering Fayetteville and coming to an intersection with US 64 Bypass (US 64 Byp), a new southern bypass of the city. US 64/SR 15 then go through downtown to intersect SR 50/US 431 and become concurrent with SR 50. They then come to another intersection with US 64 Byp, which at this point is also concurrent with US 231/SR 10. SR 50 then splits off and goes north at another intersection before US 64/SR 15 go east and leave Fayetteville. They continue east through farmland and mountains to cross the Elk River before passing through Kelso. They then pass just north of Flintville and junction with SR 275. They then intersect and have a short concurrency with SR 121 before entering Franklin County.

US 64/SR 15 then enter Huntland, where they have a junction with SR 122 and SR 97. They then pass through Belvidere before entering Winchester and having an interchange with SR 16, which provides access to downtown as US 64/SR 433 bypass it to the southeast, and SR 15 splits from US 64 again to follow SR 16. US 64 continues on its bypass around Winchester, and then bypasses Decherd, where it has an interchange with a connector road to the Nissan power train plant. The highway continues through farmland for several miles, before reaching an interchange with I-24 in Pelham and begins a concurrency with that route. Here, the highway continues past this interchange as SR 50.

=== Monteagle Mountain and Tennessee River Gorge ===
Upon joining with I-24, the two highways run southeast and immediately cross the Elk River. A few miles later, the highways begin a steep ascent up the western escarpment of the Cumberland Plateau on a stretch known as Monteagle Mountain. This section is considered one of the most dangerous stretches of the Interstate Highway System. Over the next four miles (6.4 km), I-24 and US 64 ascend 778 feet (237 m), and have several sharp curves. At the top of the mountain is a rest area, and then an interchange with US 41A in Monteagle. About 1 mile (1.6 km) later, the highway has an interchange with US 41, and begins its even steeper eastern descent off of the plateau. A brake inspection station for trucks is in the eastbound lanes at the beginning of the descent, and the Interstate expands to six lanes, with the extra westbound lane serving as a truck climbing lane, and the eastbound as an extra lane for slow trucks. The road drops 1,161 feet (354 m) on a 6% grade, and two runaway truck ramps are on the left side of the road. The eastern downgrade of Monteagle Mountain also contains one of the widest medians of any Interstate Highway. There is more than one mile (1.6 km) between the eastbound and westbound lanes at one point. The eastbound lanes descend the mountain on one side of a ridge on what was originally the patch of the old US 41/64, while the westbound lanes ascend the other side, and are curvier. At the bottom of the descent, the highway reduces to four lanes and passes through a deep valley in the plateau on a relatively flat and straight alignment.

After about 12 or 13 miles (19 or 21 km), US 64 splits onto a concurrency with US 41 and US 72 in Kimball. Briefly a four-lane undivided highway, the road quickly reduces to two lanes. A few miles later, the highways enter Jasper and meet SR 28 at an interchange. A few miles later, the highway intersects SR 27, runs along the north banks of Nickajack Lake impoundment of the Tennessee River, and crosses the lake on the Marion Memorial Bridge in Haletown. Over the next several miles, the highway runs along the south bank of the river through the Tennessee River Gorge through Walden Ridge, part of the Cumberland Plateau. This gorge, which is more than 1,000 feet (300 m) deep, is very scenic and a popular tourist attraction. This section of the highway features rolling topography, with truck climbing lanes on some of the steeper grades. Leaving the gorge, the highway passes through a pass in Raccoon Mountain, before entering Chattanooga.

=== Chattanooga ===
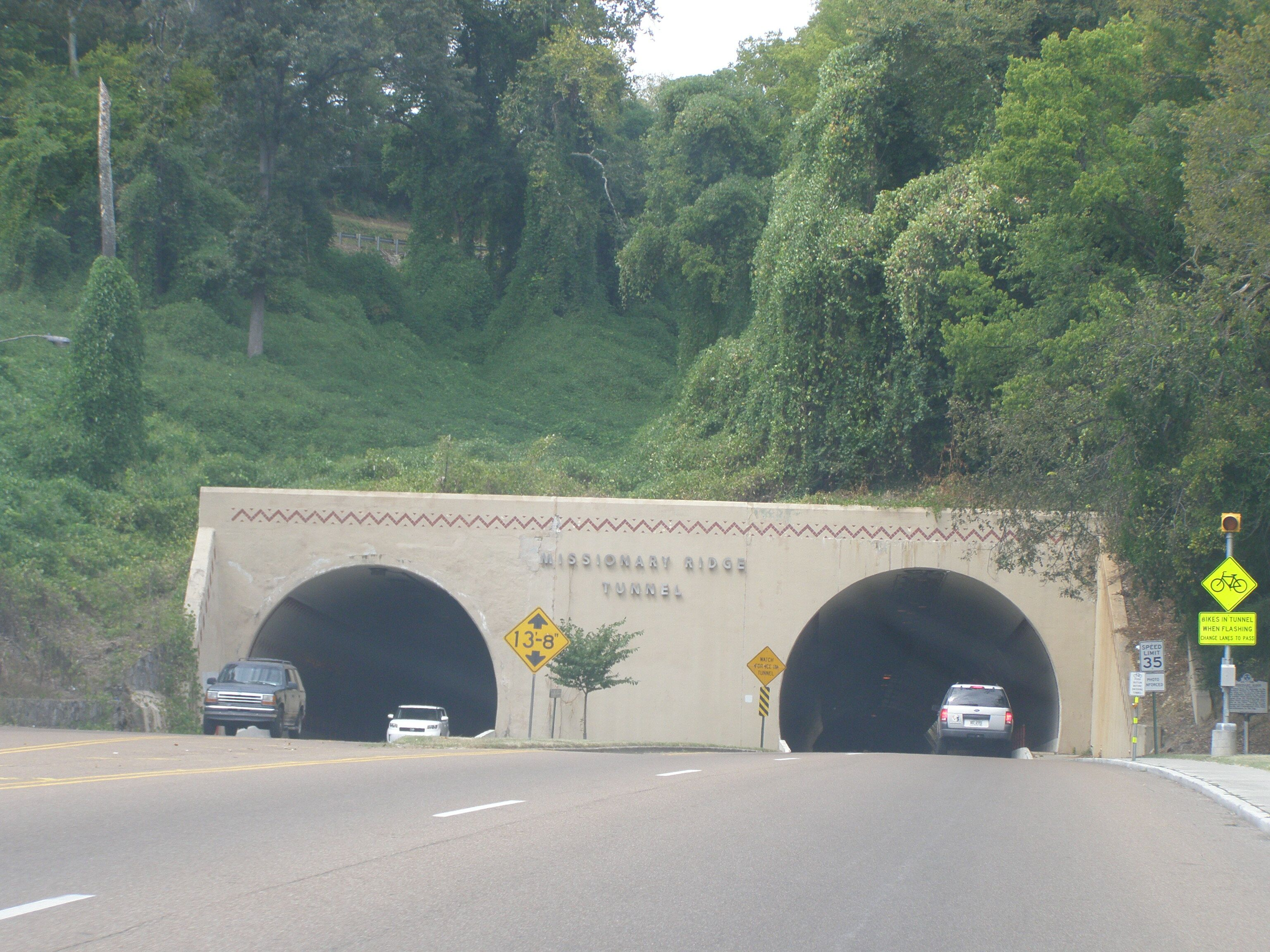
The Missionary Ridge Tunnels, carrying US 11/64 through Missionary Ridge in Chattanooga

US 64, along with US 41 and US 72 enter Chattanooga in the southwestern part of the city in the Tiftonia neighborhood in Lookout Valley. They immediately expand to a four-lane undivided highway, and once again have an interchange with I-24. Immediately beyond, the three highways begin a concurrency with US 11. The highways become Cummings Highway, and briefly shrink to two lanes underneath a railroad underpass, and begin an ascent up the northern base of Lookout Mountain. This section of highway is also very scenic, providing views of the Tennessee River and city of Chattanooga below. Along here, the highway passes by Ruby Falls, before beginning a descent. Entering the Saint Elmo neighborhood, the road once again shrinks to two lanes under a railroad underpass, and turns north, becoming Broad Street.

Passing through the Alton Park neighborhood, the highway crosses Chattanooga Creek, and then passes under I-24/US 27, with a partial interchange. Entering the edge of downtown Chattanooga, US 64 turns right onto 20th Street, splitting from US 11 and 41. Here, US 72 also abruptly ends, and US 76 begins. Running east to west as a four-to-six lane boulevard, the road turns briefly south and then curves eastward again before crossing a railyard. Just beyond this, SR 8 and SR 27 split off to the south from unsigned concurrences with US 64/76. After a few miles, US 64 turns north onto a concurrency once again with US 41 (Dodds Avenue), and US 76 splits onto a concurrency with this road to the south. US 41 splits off to the west several blocks later, and US 64 passes in front of The McCallie School before reaching an interchange with US 11 (McCallie Avenue) and turning east onto a concurrency with this route once again. The highway then passes under Missionary Ridge through the dual-bore Missionary Ridge Tunnels (also known as the McCallie Tunnels), and becomes Brainerd Road. The road enters the Brainerd community, passing through a mix of commercial and residential areas, and gradually turns northeast. The highway then crosses South Chickamauga Creek and passes south of the Chattanooga Metropolitan Airport, becoming Old Lee Highway. A few miles later, the road has an interchange with SR 153, a major north-south freeway.

Continuing through Tyner, the road briefly reduces to two lanes before turning east on a concurrency with SR 317 (Bonny Oaks Drive), which is four to six lanes. Immediately beyond, the highways begin a concurrency with I-75, turning northeast. Continuing north as an eight-lane freeway, SR 317 splits off at the next interchange about one mile (1.6 km) later as Apison Pike next to the Enterprise South Industrial Park. The highway crosses a ridge, and about two miles (3.2 km) later, US 11/64 split off to the east in Ooltewah. Passing through a commercial area, the highway is briefly a four lane divided highway before reducing to two lanes and turning northeast through a narrow pass in White Oak Mountain. The highway skirts the edge of Collegedale before entering Bradley County.

=== Cleveland, Corridor K, and Ocoee Gorge ===
Upon entering Bradley County, US 11/64 pass through the McDonald community a few miles beyond. Afterwards, the route continues through rural terrain for several miles before entering Cleveland. The highway immediately expands to four lanes and has an interchange with APD-40 (US 64 Byp./US 74). The highway crosses Candies Creek Ridge. Before turning east as Third Street, where the highway continues to the north as US 11 Byp. (Keith Street). Briefly a two-lane road, US 11/64 enters downtown Cleveland and briefly becomes a one-way pair, before splitting from US 11 as Inman Street to the east. Leaving downtown Cleveland, the highway passes under a low railroad underpass, before intersecting SR 74 (Wildwood Avenue). A few miles later, the highway expands to a four-lane divided highway on the edge of Cleveland, and has a cloverleaf interchange with APD-40 (US 64 Byp./US 74/SR 60). Here, US 64 begins a largely unsigned concurrency with US 74, and becomes part of Corridor K of the Appalachian Development Highway System.

Over the next several miles, US 64/74 passes through eastern Bradley County, crossing several ridges. The highway then enters Polk County in the Ocoee community, and as a right-in right-out interchange with US 411. The highway then becomes an undivided four lane with a center turn lane before reducing to two lanes and crossing the Ocoee River immediately beyond. A few miles later, the highway enters the Cherokee National Forest and turns sharply north into the Ocoee Gorge next to Ocoee Dam No. 1, becoming the Ocoee Scenic Byway. This scenic highway runs along the northern bank of the river through the Cohutta Mountains, part of the Blue Ridge Mountains, and is prone to blockage from rock slides. Running along the Parksville Lake impoundment of the river, the highway intersects the eastern terminus of SR 30 some distance later. The highway then crosses Greasy Creek near where the lake ends, and the road becomes even more curvier, meandering through a narrow gorge along the river. Over the next several miles, the highway passes by the powerhouse and diversion dam for Ocoee Dam No. 2 and the powerhouse for Ocoee Dam No. 3. The route briefly expands to a four-lane divided highway before passing the Ocoee Whitewater Center and turning south. US 64 then transitions away from the river, straightens out, and begins a steep ascent with an eastbound truck climbing lane. At the top of this ascent, the highway enters the Copper Basin, turns east and begins a steep descent with a westbound truck lane. Entering a long straightaway, the road leaves the national Forest, crosses Brush Creek on a high bridge, and begins a steep ascent once again, gaining a truck climbing lane. A few miles later US 64/74 enters Ducktown, where it has an interchange with SR 68. The highway expands to a four-lane divided highway, and enters North Carolina about four miles (6.4 km) beyond.

== History ==
=== Early history ===
US 64 evolved from a series of Native American trails that were later used by European American settlers. The section that is concurrent with US 11 was part of the Lee Highway, which became an auto trail in the early 20th century. The concurrent section with US 41 was part of the Dixie Highway, another auto trail. The route between Cleveland and the eastern end of the Ocoee Scenic Byway follows the route of the Old Copper Road, a wagon trail that was originally built for transporting copper from the mines in the Copper Basin to Cleveland and Chattanooga. Construction on this road began in 1851, and was completed in 1853. In the early 20th century several improvements were made to the route with the advent of the automobile. In Chattanooga, the southern bore of the Missionary Ridge Tunnels began construction in 1907, and was completed in 1913 after multiple delays. In 1923, a new highway was constructed across the Monteagle Mountain section of the Cumberland Plateau. In 1929, the Marion Memorial Bridge replaced a ferry crossing of the Tennessee River on what was then called Hales Bar Lake.

=== Later history ===
When the Appalachian Development Highway System (ADHS), was established by Congress in 1965, US 64 between Cleveland and the North Carolina line, as well as the continuing section in North Carolina, were designated as part of Corridor K, slated for improvement into a four-lane highway. This program was designed to improve connectivity and support economic development in impoverished parts of Appalachia. The first ADHS project in Tennessee to begin construction was the section of US 64 between SR 68 in Ducktown and the North Carolina state line, which began in early 1967. In 1969, two more Corridor K projects began: 7.3 miles (11.7 km) between west of APD-40 in Cleveland and east of US 411 in Ocoee, and 1.3 miles (2.1 km) in the Ocoee Gorge near the present-day Ocoee Whitewater Center.

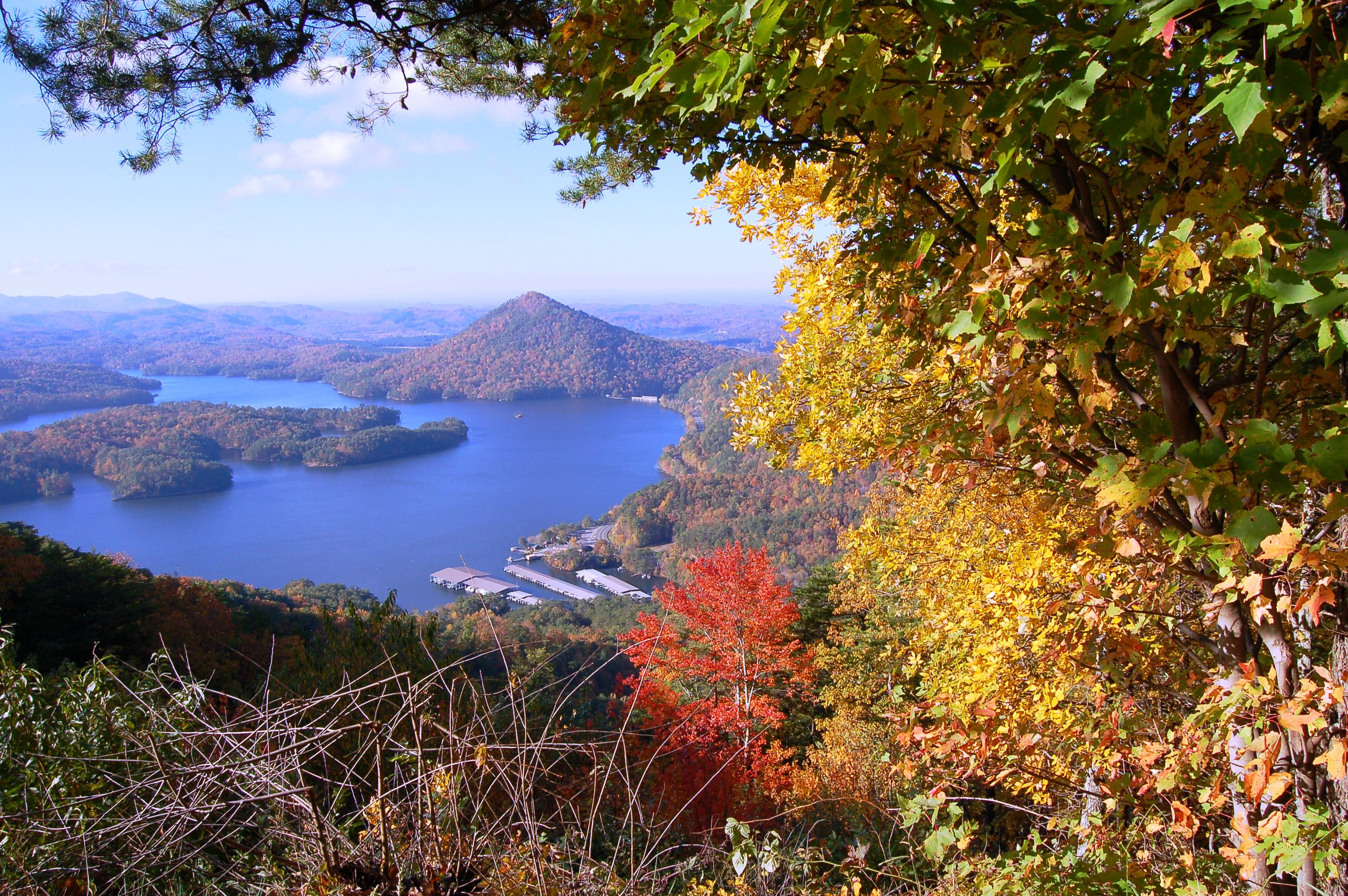
Ocoee Scenic Byway

The Ocoee Scenic Byway was the first National Forest Scenic Byway in the nation, designated on July 22, 1988 by the United States Forest Service (USFS). In accordance with the original ADHS plans, TDOT has proposed to remove the designation of US 64 from the Ocoee Scenic Byway, and build a new four lane route, due to the high volumes of commercial traffic passing through the area. Multiple methods have been proposed, including a route on the south side over the river and existing route, a route over nearby Little Frog Mountain, and a tunnel. This proposal has faced significant controversy for many decades, due to the potential costs and environmental impacts.

In 1980, TDOT identified the need for a four-lane corridor across southern Tennessee in a study. The Better Roads Program, passed by the Tennessee General Assembly, including funding for engineering and initial construction to widen the entire segment of US 64 between Memphis and Pelham to four lanes, a distance of about 266 miles (428 km), or about 70% of the length of the route in Tennessee. This program was proposed by Governor Lamar Alexander, who wanted to improve connectivity between smaller towns in Tennessee and support the state's emerging automotive industry. The final project, five miles (8.0 km) in Hardin County, began in December 22, 2014, and was completed in the fall of 2017.

In November 2009, a massive rock slide closed the Ocoee Scenic Byway for several months. This was reportedly the largest rockslide in the area's history.

== Junction list ==
County	Location	mi	km	Destinations	Notes
Mississippi River		0.0	0.0	I-55 north / US 61 north / US 64 west / US 70 west / US 78 west / US 79 south – St Louis, MO SR 1 begins	Continuation into Arkansas; western terminus of SR 1
Shelby	Memphis	0.5– 0.7	0.80– 1.1	I-55 south – Jackson, MS	Eastern end of I-55 concurrency; I-55 exit 12
Shelby	Memphis	1.3	2.1	US 61 south (S 3rd Street / SR 14 south) – Vicksburg, Brownsville US 78 east (E.H. Crump Boulevard / SR 4 east) – Holly Springs	Eastern end of US 61/US 78 concurrency; western end of SR 4/SR 14 concurrency
Shelby	Memphis	2.2	3.5	Doctor M.L.K. Jr Boulevard / SR 278 west – Holly Springs	Western terminus of unsigned SR 278; former western terminus of US 78
Shelby	Memphis	2.6	4.2	SR 3 north / SR 14 north (N B.B. King Boulevard/N 2nd Street)	Western end of SR 3 concurrency; eastern end of SR 14 concurrency
Shelby	Memphis	2.9	4.7	US 51 north / SR 1 east (Danny Thompson Boulevard) – Millington	Eastern end of SR 1 concurrency; western end of US 51 concurrency
Shelby	Memphis	4.0– 4.2	6.4– 6.8	I-240 south – Jackson, MS	No direct access to north(west)bound I-240 nor from south(east)bound I-240 (both signed at Madison Avenue); I-240 exit 30
Shelby	Memphis	4.3	6.9	US 51 south / SR 3 south (S Bellevue Boulevard) – Jackson	Eastern end of US 51/SR 3 concurrency; western terminus of unsigned SR 23; western end of unsigned SR 23 concurrency
Shelby	Memphis	6.4	10.3	SR 23 east (Union Avenue) / SR 277 south (East Parkway S)	Eastern end of unsigned SR 23 concurrency; western end of unsigned SR 277 concurrency
Shelby	Memphis	6.9	11.1	US 72 east / SR 57 east (Poplar Avenue) – Collierville	Western terminus of US 72; western end of SR 57 concurrency
Shelby	Memphis	7.5	12.1	Sam Cooper Boulevard east to I-40 / I-240 - Nashville	Western terminus of Sam Cooper Boulevard
Shelby	Memphis	7.7	12.4	SR 1 west (North Parkway) / SR 57 west (N Trezevant Street)	Western end of SR 1 concurrency; eastern end of SR 57 and unsigned SR 277 concurrency; northern terminus of unsigned SR 277
Shelby	Memphis	13.0– 13.2	20.9– 21.2	I-40 west to I-240 west – Little Rock, AR, Jackson, MS	No access to I-40 eastbound; I-40 exit 12A
Shelby	Bartlett	17.7	28.5	US 70 east / US 79 north (Summer Avenue/SR 1 east) / SR 15 west (Stage Road) – Arlington	Eastern end of US 70/US 79/SR 1 concurrency; western end of unsigned SR 15 concurrency
Shelby	Bartlett	20.2	32.5	SR 177 (Germantown Road) – Germantown, Brunswick	
Shelby	Bartlett	21.1– 21.4	34.0– 34.4	I-40 – Memphis, Nashville	I-40 exit 18
Shelby	Eads	28.0– 28.1	45.1– 45.2	I-269 (Winfield Dunn Parkway) – Arlington, Collierville	I-269 exit 15; Memphis outer beltway
Shelby	Eads	28.2	45.4	SR 205 (Airline Road) – Collierville, Fisherville, Arlington	
Fayette	Hickory Withe	32.1	51.7	SR 196 (Chulahoma Road) – Piperton, Gallaway	
Fayette	Oakland	36.2	58.3	SR 194 (Church Street) – Macon, Rossville	
Fayette	Somerville	45.6	73.4	SR 76 (Main Street) – Brownsville, Williston, Moscow	
Fayette	Laconia	51.0– 51.1	82.1– 82.2	Bridge over the Loosahatchie River	
Hardeman	Whiteville	57.8	93.0	US 64 Bus. east (West Main Street)	Western terminus of US 64 Bus
Hardeman	Whiteville	58.4	94.0	SR 179 west (S Cross Avenue)	Eastern terminus of SR 179
Hardeman	Whiteville	59.4	95.6	US 64 Bus. west (East Main Street)	Eastern terminus of US 64 Bus
Hardeman	Whiteville	59.6	95.9	SR 100 east – Toone, Henderson	Western terminus of SR 100
Hardeman	Bolivar	69.0	111.0	SR 18 south (Tennessee Street) – Hickory Valley, Grand Junction	Western end of SR 18 concurrency
Hardeman	Bolivar	69.7	112.2	SR 18 north / SR 125 (Main Street) – Middleton, Toone	Eastern end of SR 18 concurrency
Hardeman		73.6– 73.7	118.4– 118.6	Bridge over the Hatchie River	
McNairy		83.7	134.7	SR 225 north (Woodville Road)	Southern terminus of SR 225
McNairy	Selmer	91.5	147.3	US 45 north (Marcus J. Wright Memorial Highway/SR 5) / US 64 Bus. east (W Cherry Avenue/SR 15) – Henderson, Bethel Springs, Downtown	Interchange; western end of US 45 concurrency; western terminus of US 64 Bus
McNairy	Selmer	95.5	153.7	US 45 south (Marcus J. Wright Memorial Highway/SR 5) / US 64 Bus. west (W Cherry Avenue/SR 15) – Eastview, Corinth, Downtown	Eastern end of US 45 concurrency; eastern terminus of US 64 Bus
McNairy		104.8	168.7	Airport Road – Robert Sibley Airport	
McNairy		108.7	174.9	SR 224 south (Gilchrist Stantonville Road) – Stantonville, Michie	Western end of SR 224 concurrency
McNairy		109.9	176.9	SR 224 north (Leapwood Enville Road) – Enville	Eastern end of SR 224 concurrency
McNairy	Adamsville	111.8	179.9	SR 22 north / SR 117 south (Maple Street) – Milledgeville, Stantonville	Western end of SR 22 concurrency; northern terminus of SR 117; provides access to Shiloh National Military Park
Hardin	Crump	115.7	186.2	SR 69 north (Morris Chapel Road) – Milledgeville	Western end of SR 69 concurrency
Hardin	Crump	115.9	186.5	SR 22 south – Shiloh, Michie	Eastern end of SR 22 concurrency; provides access to Shiloh National Military Park
Hardin	Savannah	119.3– 119.7	192.0– 192.6	Harrison-McGarity Carpenter Memorial Bridge over the Tennessee River	
Hardin	Savannah	119.9	193.0	US 64 Truck east (Water Street)	Western terminus of US 64 Truck
Hardin	Savannah	120.3	193.6	SR 128 south (Pickwick Street) – Walkertown, Pickwick Dam	Western end of SR 128 concurrency; provides access to Pickwick Landing State Park and Pickwick Landing Dam
Hardin	Savannah	120.5	193.9	SR 69 south / US 64 Truck west (Florence Road) to SR 203 – Walkertown, Walnut Grove	Eastern end of SR 69 concurrency; eastern terminus of US 64 Truck
Hardin	Olivet	123.0	197.9	SR 226 south (Airport Road) – Savannah-Hardin County Airport, Olivet, Maddox	Northern terminus of SR 226
Hardin		125.7	202.3	SR 128 north (New Highway 128) – Clifton	Eastern end of SR 128 concurrency
Wayne	Clifton Junction	139.1	223.9	US 641 north (Billy Nance Highway/SR 114) – Clifton	Southern terminus of US 641
Wayne	Waynesboro	150.9	242.9	SR 13 (N High Street/Waynesboro Highway) – Collinwood, Linden	Interchange via Access road
Wayne	Waynesboro	151.0– 151.3	243.0– 243.5	J. H. Haggard Sr. Memorial Bridge over the Green River	
Wayne	Waynesboro	151.5	243.8	– Wayne Medical Center	
Wayne	Waynesboro	152.2	244.9	SR 99 east (Old Highway 64 E) – Hohenwald	Western terminus of SR 99
Wayne–Lawrence county line		162.3– 162.6	261.2– 261.7	Natchez Trace Parkway	Interchange / access road
Lawrence	Deerfield	166.6	268.1	SR 240 north – Henryville, Summertown	Southern terminus of SR 240
Lawrence	Deerfield	172.5	277.6	SR 241 north (Red Hill Center Road) – Henryville	Southern terminus of SR 241
Lawrence	Lawrenceburg	175.4	282.3	US 64 Bus. east (W Gaines Street)	Western terminus of US 64 Bus; provides access to David Crockett State Park
Lawrence	Lawrenceburg	176.6	284.2	SR 242 (West Point Road) – Westpoint, Iron City	Interchange; provides access to David Crockett State Park
Lawrence	Lawrenceburg	178.7– 178.8	287.6– 287.8	Ivan Johnston Bridge over Shoal Creek	
Lawrence	Lawrenceburg	179.4	288.7	New Power House Road - New Shoal Creek Dam	
Lawrence	Lawrenceburg	180.1– 180.6	289.8– 290.6	US 43 (S Locust Avenue/Andrew Jackson Highway/SR 6) – Columbia, Florence	Interchange
Lawrence	Lawrenceburg	186.9	300.8	US 64 Bus. west (Pulaski Highway) – Lawrenceburg-Lawrence County Airport	Eastern terminus of US 64 Bus
Giles	Pulaski	196.2	315.8	SR 166 north (Campbellsville Road) – Campbellsville, Mount Pleasant	Western end of SR 166 concurrency
Giles	Pulaski	197.4	317.7	SR 15 east / SR 166 south (College Street) – Pulaski	Eastern end of SR 15 / SR 166 concurrency
Giles	Pulaski	199.8	321.5	SR 11 (Minor Hill Highway) – Pulaski, Minor Hill	
Giles	Pulaski	200.1	322.0	SR 166 (Bethel Road) – Bethel, Pulaski	Provides access to Abernathy Field
Giles	Pulaski	202.2	325.4	US 31 (Elkton Pike/SR 7) – Columbia, Pulaski, Elkton, Ardmore	
Giles	Pulaski	203.9	328.1	SR 15 west (E College Street) – Pulaski	Western end of SR 15 concurrency
Giles	Frankewing	210.8– 211.0	339.2– 339.6	I-65 – Nashville, Huntsville	I-65 exit 14
Lincoln	Boonshill	219.9	353.9	SR 244 north (Boonshill Petersburg Road) – Petersburg	Southern terminus of SR 244
Lincoln		226.8	365.0	SR 273 west (Old Elkton Pike) – Dellrose, Elkton	Western end of unsigned SR 273 concurrency
Lincoln	Fayetteville	228.4	367.6	US 64 Byp. east (Wilson Parkway) – Winchester	Western terminus of US 64 Bypass; southern bypass of Fayetteville
Lincoln	Fayetteville	229.9	370.0	US 431 / SR 50 west (Main Avenue/SR 273 east) – Lewisburg, Petersburg, Park City, Huntsville	Western end of SR 50 concurrency; eastern end of unsigned SR 273 concurrency
Lincoln	Fayetteville	230.9	371.6	US 231 / US 64 Byp. west (Thornton Taylor Parkway/SR 10) – Shelbyville, Pulaski, Park City, Huntsville	Eastern terminus of US 64 Bypass; southern bypass of Fayetteville
Lincoln	Fayetteville	232.4	374.0	SR 50 east (Lynchburg Highway) – Lynchburg	Eastern end of SR 50 concurrency
Lincoln	Kelso	235.5– 235.8	379.0– 379.5	Donny Ray Hudson Memorial Bridge over the Elk River	
Lincoln		241.0	387.9	SR 275 west (Flintville Road) – Flintville	Eastern terminus of SR 275
Lincoln		243.9	392.5	SR 121 south (Elora Road) – Elora	Western end of SR 121 concurrency
Lincoln		244.1	392.8	SR 121 north (Shady Grove Road) – Broadview	Eastern end of SR 121 concurrency; provides access to Tims Ford Dam/Lake
Franklin	Huntland	250.2	402.7	SR 122 west (Main Street) – Huntland	Eastern terminus of SR 122
Franklin	Winchester	260.5	419.2	US 64 Bus. (Rowe Gap Road/1st Avenue/SR 15 east) / SR 16 – Winchester, Hytop, AL, Skyline, AL	Partial interchange; eastern end of unsigned SR 15 concurrency; western end of unsigned SR 433 concurrency; southern terminus of unsigned SR 433
Franklin	Winchester	264.2– 264.6	425.2– 425.8	US 41A (Cowan Highway/SR 15) – Winchester, Decherd, Tullahoma, Cowan	Interchange; provides access to Winchester Municipal Airport
Franklin	Decherd	268.5– 269.2	432.1– 433.2	SR 50 west (Nissan Powertrain Drive) – Decherd	Interchange; northern terminus of unsigned SR 433; western end of SR 50 concurrency
Franklin–Coffee county line	Alto	278.2– 278.3	447.7– 447.9	Bridge over the Elk River	
Coffee	No major junctions				
Grundy	Pelham	279.2	449.3	I-24 west / SR 50 west (Payne Cove Road) – Nashville, Pelham	Western end of I-24 concurrency; eastern end of SR 50 concurrency; I-24 exit 127
Marion	Monteagle	286.0	460.3	US 41A (W Main Street/SR 15) – Monteagle, Sewanee	I-24 exit 134
Marion	Monteagle	287.1	462.0	To US 41 north (SR 2 west/Dixie Lee Avenue) – Monteagle, Tracy City	Western end of SR 2 concurrency; I-24 Exit 135
Marion		294.3– 294.5	473.6– 474.0	SR 2 east (Martin Springs Road)	Eastern end of SR 2 concurrency; I-24 Exit 143
Marion	Kimball	303.4– 303.9	488.3– 489.1	I-24 east / US 72 west (N Cedar Avenue/SR 27) – Chattanooga, South Pittsburg	Eastern end of I-24 concurrency; western end of US 72/SR 27 concurrency; I-24 exit 152
Marion	Kimball	304.0	489.2	SR 2 west (Battle Creek Road)	Western end of SR 2 concurrency
Marion	Jasper	308.8– 308.9	497.0– 497.1	US 41 north / SR 28 (SR 27) – Whitwell, Tracy City	Interchange; western end of US 41 concurrency; eastern end of SR 27 concurrency
Marion	Jasper	309.5– 309.6	498.1– 498.3	Marion County Veterans Bridge over the Sequatchie River	
Marion		312.0	502.1	SR 27 (Griffin Highway) – Marion County-Brown Field, Powells Crossroads	
Marion	Haletown	314.1– 314.4	505.5– 506.0	Marion Memorial Bridge over the Tennessee River/Nickajack Lake	
Marion	Haletown	314.6	506.3	SR 134 east (J E Clouse Highway) – Whiteside	Western terminus of SR 134
Hamilton	Lookout Valley	328.9– 329.0	529.3– 529.5	I-24 – Chattanooga, Nashville	I-24 exit 174
Hamilton	Lookout Valley	329.2	529.8	US 11 south (Birmingham Highway/SR 38)	Western end of US 11 concurrency; northern terminus of unsigned SR 38
Hamilton	Lookout Valley	330.7	532.2	SR 318 south (Old Wauhatchie Pike) – Lookout Mountain	Northern terminus of SR 318
Hamilton	Lookout Valley	331.8	534.0	SR 148 south (Lookout Mountain Parkway) – Lookout Mountain	Northern terminus of SR 148
Hamilton	Chattanooga	332.7	535.4	SR 17 south (Tennessee Avenue) to SR 58 – Lookout Mountain	Western end of SR 17 concurrency
Hamilton	Chattanooga	333.9– 334.1	537.4– 537.7	US 27 north (I-124 north/SR 27 west/SR 29 north) – Red Bank, Downtown	No direct access to westbound I-24; northbound exit and southbound entrance from US 27
Hamilton	Chattanooga	334.2	537.8	US 41 north / US 72 east / SR 17 north (Broad Street) / SR 58 north (W 20th Street)	Eastern end of US 41 / US 72 / SR 17 concurrency; western end of SR 58 concurrency
Hamilton	Chattanooga	334.5	538.3	SR 58 south (Market Street)	Eastern end of SR 58 concurrency
Hamilton	Chattanooga	335.3	539.6	I-24 west – Nashville, Birmingham	Direct access only from eastbound I-24; I-24 exit 180A
Hamilton	Chattanooga	336.9	542.2	US 41 south (Westside Drive/SR 8) / US 76 west – East Ridge	Western end of US 41 / US 76 concurrency
Hamilton	Chattanooga	337.4	543.0	US 41 north / US 76 west (E Main Street/SR 8)	Eastern end of US 41 / US 76 concurrency
Hamilton	Chattanooga	338.4– 338.6	544.6– 544.9	McCallie Tunnels under Missionary Ridge	
Hamilton	Chattanooga	342.0	550.4	SR 320 east (East Brainerd Road) – East Brainerd	Western terminus of SR 320
Hamilton	Chattanooga	343.7– 343.8	553.1– 553.3	SR 153 – Soddy-Daisy, Falling Water	SR 153 exit 1
Hamilton	Chattanooga	347.1	558.6	SR 317 west (Bonny Oaks Drive) – Tyner	Western end of SR 317 concurrency
Hamilton	Chattanooga	347.2– 347.5	558.8– 559.2	I-75 south / US 74 west – Atlanta	Western end of I-75/US 74 concurrency; I-75 exit 7
Hamilton	Chattanooga	348.7– 349.3	561.2– 562.1	SR 317 east (Apison Pike) – Ooltewah, Collegedale	Eastern end of SR 317 concurrency; I-75 exit 9
Hamilton	Ooltewah	351.4	565.5	I-75 north / US 74 east – Knoxville	Eastern end of I-75 / US 74 concurrency; I-75 exit 11
Hamilton	Ooltewah	352.2	566.8	SR 321 south (Main Street) – Collegedale, East Brainerd	Northern terminus of SR 321
Bradley	Cleveland	361.8– 362.0	582.3– 582.6	US 74 / US 64 Byp. (APD-40/SR 311)	Interchange
Bradley	Cleveland	364.3	586.3	US 11 Byp. north (Keith Street/SR 2) SR 40 begins	Eastern end of unsigned SR 2 concurrency; southern terminus of US 11 Bypass; western terminus of unsigned SR 40; western end of unsigned SR 40 concurrency
Bradley	Cleveland	365.0	587.4	US 11 north (Broad Street/Ocoee Street/SR 74 north) / SR 312 east (Inman Street)	Western end of SR 74 concurrency; eastern end of US 11 concurrency; eastern terminus of SR 312
Bradley	Cleveland	365.4	588.1	SR 60 south / SR 74 south (Wildwood Avenue) – Wildwood Lake, Dalton, GA	Eastern end of SR 74 concurrency; western end of SR 60 concurrency
Bradley	Cleveland	366.6– 367.0	590.0– 590.6	US 74 west / US 64 Byp. end / SR 60 north (APD-40/SR 311)	Interchange; eastern end of SR 60 concurrency; western end of US 74 concurrency
Polk	Ocoee	374.3	602.4	US 411 (SR 33) – Benton, Chatsworth, Georgia	Interchange
Polk	Parksville	378.7	609.5	SR 314 north (Parksville Road) – Benton	Southern terminus of SR 314
Polk	Cherokee National Forest	383.9	617.8	SR 30 west – Reliance	Eastern terminus of SR 30
Polk	Ducktown	400.1– 400.4	643.9– 644.4	SR 68 – Copperhill, Ducktown	Interchange
North Carolina state line		404.1	650.3	US 64 east / US 74 east – Murphy	Continuation east into North Carolina; eastern terminus of unsigned SR 40
1.000 mi = 1.609 km; 1.000 km = 0.621 mi: Concurrency terminus; Incomplete access

== Related routes ==
=== U.S. Route 64 Bypass ===
U.S. Route 64 Bypass
- APD-40; Veterans Memorial Highway
- Location: Bypass around Cleveland
- Length: 6.6 mi (10.6 km)
- Existed: 1966–present

A bypass route exists for the route in Cleveland. The east–west route is part of a beltway around the business district known as APD-40, and stretches from I-75 to a cloverleaf interchange with US 64 and SR 60. SR 60 makes up the remainder of the route. Part of the route is controlled access, and an interchange with US 11/64 is located approximately one mile (1.6 km) from the western terminus.

=== State Route 40 ===
State Route 40
- Location: Cleveland–North Carolina
- Length: 39.63 mi (63.78 km)
- Existed: October 1, 1923–present

State Route 40 (SR 40) runs as a secret, or hidden designation for US 64/US 74 from downtown Cleveland, in Bradley County to the North Carolina state line near Ducktown, in Polk County. SR 40 was also a former designation for part of APD-40, which is the origin of part of the common name of that route. SR 40 becomes secondary east of its intersection with SR 60 in Cleveland.

=== State Route 433 ===
State Route 433
- Location: Winchester–Decherd
- Length: 8.2 mi (13.2 km)

State Route 433 (SR 433) is the unsigned designation for US 64’s southern and eastern bypass of the cities of Winchester and Decherd in Franklin County, Tennessee. The entire route is a four-lane divided highway (which is known locally as Veterans Memorial Drive), with interchanges at SR 16 (1st Avenue/Rowe Gap Road), US 41A (S College Street/Cowan Highway), and SR 50 (Nissan Powertrain Drive).

U.S. Route 64
Previous state: Arkansas	Tennessee	Next state: North Carolina
