= Tennessee State Route 27 =

State highway in Tennessee, United States

State Route 27
- SR 27; primary in red, secondary in blue, unsigned in green

Route information
- Maintained by TDOT
- Length: 48.51 mi (78.07 km)
- Existed: October 1, 1923–present

Major junctions
- West end: US 72 at the Alabama state line near South Pittsburg
- I-24 / US 64 at Kimball; US 41 in Jasper; SR 283 in Powells Crossroads; US 127 in Signal Mountain; US 27 / SR 8 in north Chattanooga; US 11 / US 41 / US 64 / US 72 in downtown Chattanooga; I-24 in Chattanooga
- East end: US 27 / SR 1 at the Georgia state line near Chattanooga

Location
- Country: United States
- State: Tennessee
- Counties: Marion, Hamilton

Highway system
- Tennessee State Routes; Interstate; US; State
| ← US 27 | → SR 28 |

State Route 27 (SR 27) is an east–west state highway in southeastern Tennessee. The 48.51-mile-long (78.07 km) route traverses portions of Marion and Hamilton counties in Tennessee, including the Chattanooga area. Both of this route's termini are at state lines. Its western end is at the Alabama state line near South Pittsburg, and its eastern end is at the Georgia state line on Chattanooga's south side.

== Route description ==
=== Marion County ===
SR 27 begins as it runs concurrently as a secret, or hidden, designation, with U.S. Route 72 (US 72) once that highway enters Tennessee from Jackson County, Alabama. This point also marks the eastern terminus of unsigned Alabama State Route 2. During SR 27's concurrency with US 72 in Marion County, it traverses the cities of South Pittsburg, Kimball, and the Marion County seat of Jasper, as well as the exit 152 interchange on Interstate 24 (I-24), where they pick up US 64. They then pick up SR 2 where it, too, becomes a secret designation. They join US 41 in Jasper. SR 27 departs from US 41/US 64/US 72 and SR 2 near Nickajack Lake, and then SR 27 travels northward to Powells Crossroads. After the brief concurrency with SR 283 in that area, SR 27 changes from a secondary route to a primary one, and then enters Hamilton County.

=== Hamilton County ===
Near Signal Mountain, SR 27 once again becomes a hidden route when it joins US 127 as well as another secret designation in SR 8 just within Chattanooga's northern outskirts. SR 27 then joins US 27 (SR 29), still as a secret designation for the rest of its course southeastward, including the segment of the US 27 freeway that also has an unsigned designation of Interstate 124 (I-124). US 27 and SR 27 passe through downtown Chattanooga, with a brief concurrency with I-24 between exits 178 and 180, and then it turns southward, still following US 27, and for SR 27 to terminate at the Georgia state line, which in this area, coincides with the Chattanooga city limits, as well as those of Rossville, Georgia and Walker County's northern boundary. US 27 continues southward with Georgia State Route 1 into the northwest Georgia counties of Walker and Catoosa.

== Major intersections ==
| County | Location | mi | km | Destinations | Notes |
|---|---|---|---|---|---|
| Jackson | Bridgeport | 0.00 | 0.00 | US 72 west (SR 2 west) – Scottsboro | Western terminus; continuation into Alabama; western end of US 72 concurrency; SR 27 begins as an unsigned primary highway |
| Marion | South Pittsburg | | | SR 156 – South Pittsburg, New Hope | Interchange; eastbound exit and westbound entrance |
| Marion | South Pittsburg | | | SR 156 – South Pittsburg | Interchange; westbound exit and eastbound entrance |
| Marion | Kimball | | | I-24 / US 64 west – Nashville, Chattanooga | I-24 exit 152; western end of US 64 concurrency; SR 27 turns secondary |
| Marion | Kimball | | | SR 2 west (Battle Creek Road) | Western end of SR 2 concurrency |
| Marion | Jasper | | | US 41 north (Betsy Pack Drive/SR 150 west) – Tracy City, South Cumberland State Park | Western end of concurrency with US 41; eastern terminus of SR 150 |
| Marion | Jasper | | | US 41 south / US 64 east / US 72 east (Main Street/SR 2 east) / SR 28 north – Haletown, Whitwell, Nickajack Lake | Interchange; eastern end of US 41/US 64/US 72/SR 2 concurrency; western end of SR 28 concurrency |
| Marion | | | | I-24 west – Nashville | I-24 exit 155; southern terminus of SR 28; western end of I-24 concurrency |
| Marion | | | | I-24 east – Chattanooga | I-24 exit 158; eastern end of I-24 concurrency; SR 27 becomes signed |
| Marion | | | | US 41 / US 64 / US 72 (Dixie Highway W/SR 2) – Jasper, Haletown | |
| Marion | Powells Crossroads | | | SR 283 (Alvin C York Highway) – Whitwell, Dunlap | SR 27 turns primary |
| Hamilton | Signal Mountain | | | US 127 north (Signal Mountain Boulevard/SR 8 north) – Walden, Fairmount, Dunlap | Northern end of US 127 and SR 8 concurrency; SR 27 becomes unsigned |
| Hamilton | Chattanooga | | | US 27 north (SR 29 north) – Soddy-Daisy | Southern terminus of US 127; western end of US 27 and SR 29 concurrency; interchange |
| Hamilton | Chattanooga | | | SR 8 south (Cherokee Boulevard) | Northbound exit and southbound entrance; interchange; eastern end of SR 8 concurrency |
| Hamilton | Chattanooga | | | Manufacturers Road | Interchange |
| Hamilton | Chattanooga | | | P.R. Olgiati Bridge over Tennessee River | |
| Hamilton | Chattanooga | | | 4th Street (SR 389 east) | I-124's northern terminus; western end of I-124 concurrency; western terminus of unsigned SR 389; exit 1C on I-124 |
| Hamilton | Chattanooga | | | Martin Luther King Boulevard (SR 316 east) | Exit 1A-B on I-124; western terminus of unsigned SR 316 |
| Hamilton | Chattanooga | | | Main Street | Northbound exit and southbound entrance; exit 1 on I-124 |
| Hamilton | Chattanooga | | | I-24 west / US 11 / US 41 / US 64 / US 76 / SR 17 / SR 58 – Nashville, Birmingham | Southern terminus of I-124 and eastern end of I-124 concurency; western end of I-24 concurrency; exit 178 on I-24 |
| Hamilton | Chattanooga | | | I-24 east / SR 8 north to I-75 – East Ridge, Knoxville, Atlanta | Eastern end of I-24 concurrency; exit 180 on I-24 |
| Georgia state line | | 48.51 | 78.07 | US 27 south (SR 1 south) – Rossville | Southern end of US 27/SR 29 concurrency; eastern terminus; SR 27 ends as an unsigned primary highway; continuation southward into Georgia |
1.000 mi = 1.609 km; 1.000 km = 0.621 mi: Concurrency terminus; Incomplete access
