= U.S. Route 41 in Tennessee =

United States Numbered Highway in Tennessee

U.S. Route 41
- US 41 highlighted in red

Route information
- Maintained by TDOT
- Length: 194.58 mi (313.15 km)
- Existed: November 11, 1926–present

Major junctions
- South end: US 41 / US 76 at the Georgia state line in East Ridge
- I-75 in East Ridge; I-24 in Chattanooga; US 11 / US 64 in Chattanooga; US 64 / US 72 in Jasper; US 70S / US 231 in Murfreesboro; I-840 in Murfreesboro; I-24 / I-40 in Nashville; US 31 / US 31A / US 41A in Nashville; US 70 / US 431 in Nashville; I-65 in Nashville
- North end: US 41 at Kentucky state line near Adams

Location
- Country: United States
- State: Tennessee
- Counties: Hamilton, Marion, Grundy, Coffee, Rutherford, Davidson, Sumner, Robertson, Montgomery

Highway system
- United States Numbered Highway System; List; Special; Divided; Tennessee State Routes; Interstate; US; State
← SR 40	→ US 41A

U.S. Route 41 (US 41) is a United States Numbered Highway that runs from Miami, Florida, to Copper Harbor, Michigan. In Tennessee, the highway is paralleled by Interstate 24 all the way from Georgia to Kentucky, and I-24 has largely supplanted US 41 as a major highway, especially for large and heavy vehicles, such as tractor-trailer trucks and buses.

== Route description ==
US 41, joined by US 76, enters Tennessee east of I-75 on the outskirts of East Ridge, an immediately has a junction with that road. It is called "Ringgold Road" through East Ridge up to the Bachman Tunnel, where it enters Chattanooga. In Chattanooga, US 41 and US 76 becomes Westside Drive up to the intersection with Dodds Avenue, where for a short distance it is coexistent with Dodds Avenue. Then US 41 and US 76 becomes East Main Street in downtown Chattanooga up to the intersection with Broad Street (US 11 and US 64). At that point US 76 terminates, US 72 begins, and the now-conjoined US 41 and US 72 merges with US 11 and US 64, trekking southwestward around the base of Lookout Mountain into the Tiftonia community. Just west of Tiftonia, US 11 splits off, and it veers southwestward into Georgia. US 41, US 64, and US 72 take a westward path from Hamilton County into Marion County. US 41 breaks off from US 64 and US 72 at Jasper and joins with unsigned SR 150 before ascending the Cumberland Plateau. US 41 leaves SR 150 and joins with SR 56 at Tracy City and runs southwest into Monteagle. In Monteagle, US 41 descends toward Manchester, with US 41A breaking off toward Franklin County, travelling through Winchester, Tullahoma, Shelbyville, and other small communities before becoming merging with US 31A and becoming Nolensville Pike in Nashville.

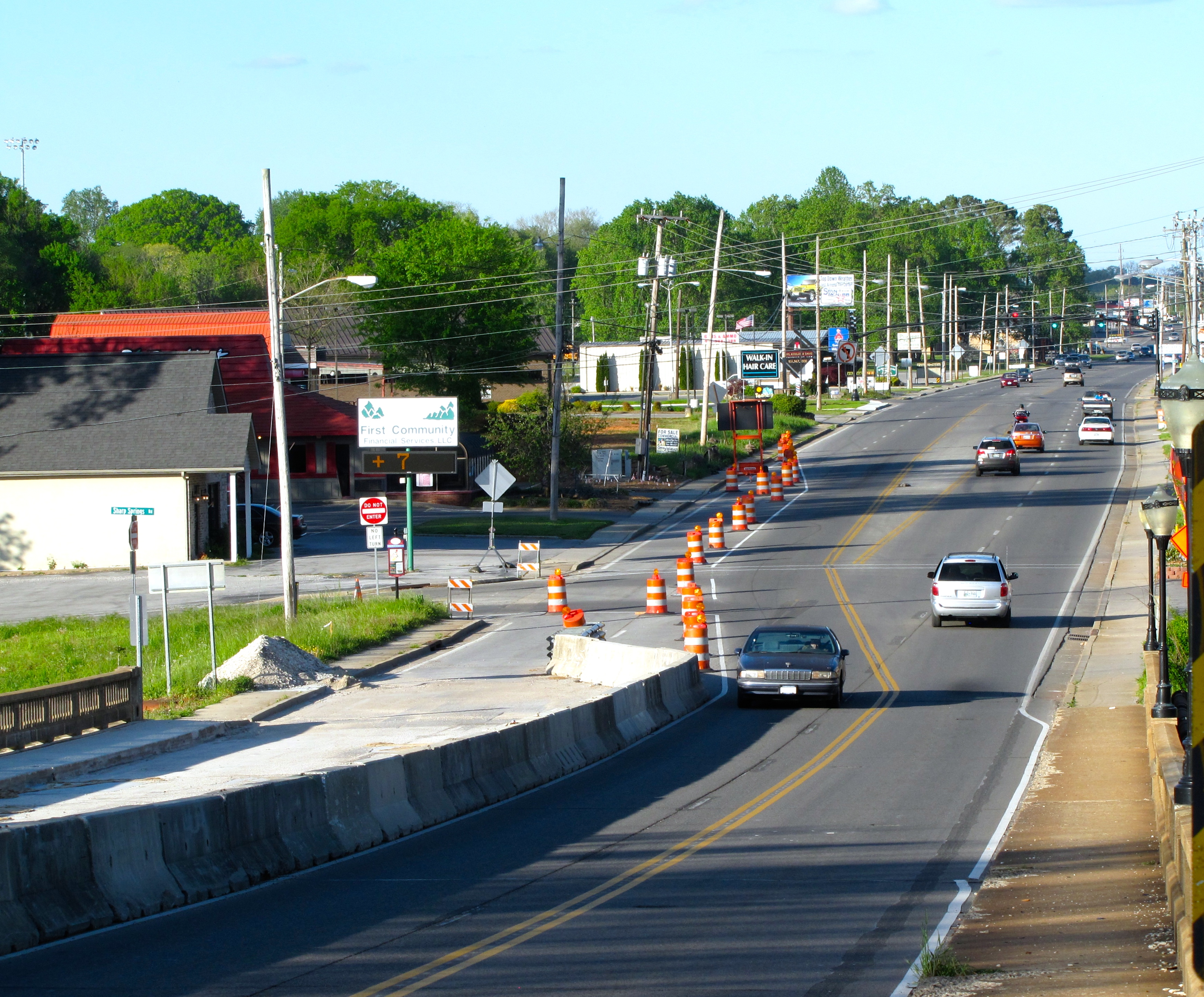
US 41A in Winchester

After reaching Monteagle, US 41, included as part of the older Dixie Highway, continues northwest into Pelham, in Grundy County, then runs closely parallel with I-24 into Coffee County, going through Hillsboro, Manchester (where the road is also named Hillsboro Blvd) and Beechgrove, before entering Rutherford County. From there, the highway continues diagonally through Murfreesboro (where the road is also named Broad St.), where the Dixie Highway joins up with US 70S. The Stones River National Battlefield is located very near US 41 and US 70S on the northwest side, standing as a monument of the Battle of Stones River which took place during the American Civil War. US 41/70S continues northwest through Smyrna, and La Vergne before reaching Davidson County. The road passes through Antioch, before reaching Nashville, where US 41 separates from US 70S. US 41 goes through Nashville as Murfreesboro Pike, then Dickerson Pike, and comes out on the northeast side of the city joined with US 31W. US 41 continues northeast through Goodlettsville before breaking away from US 31W. US 41 then goes northwest and continues on into Robertson County, going through Springfield before heading west/northwest to the Kentucky border. Just before reaching Kentucky, US 41 briefly runs through Montgomery County.

== History ==
The road that is now US 41 evolved out of a series of Native American trails first used by European American settlers in the late 18th and 19th centuries. During the American Civil War, the road was a crucial transportation corridor connecting the North and the South, and was heavily fought over. One of the bloodiest engagements in the war occurred in Murfreesboro at the Battle of Stones River. The road was also used as one of the principal corridors during the Tullahoma Campaign.

In the early 20th century, the route became part of the Dixie Highway, a network of auto trails. A road across Monteagle Mountain was first constructed in 1923. During Prohibition, Monteagle was reportedly the halfway stopover point for crime boss Al Capone on his trips between Chicago and his resort in Miami. In 1929, the Marion Memorial Bridge replaced a ferry crossing of the Tennessee River on what was then called Hales Bar Lake.

== Major intersections ==
County	Location	mi	km	Destinations	Notes
Hamilton	East Ridge	0.00	0.00	US 41 south / US 76 east (SR 3 south) – Dalton	Continuation into Georgia
Hamilton	East Ridge	0.00	0.00	SR 8 begins	Southern terminus of SR 8; southern end of SR 8 concurrency
Hamilton	East Ridge	0.8– 1.1	1.3– 1.8	I-75 – Chattanooga, Atlanta	Exit 1 on I-75
Hamilton	East Ridge–Chattanooga line	5.0– 5.3	8.0– 8.5	Bachman Tubes under Missionary Ridge	
Hamilton	Chattanooga	5.6	9.0	I-24 west – Nashville, Birmingham	Westbound exit and eastbound entrance; exit 181A on I-24
Hamilton	Chattanooga	5.7	9.2	US 11 north / US 64 east (East 23rd Street/SR 2 west)	Southern end of US 11/US 64/SR 2 concurrency
Hamilton	Chattanooga	6.2	10.0	US 11 south / US 64 west (Dodds Avenue/SR 2 east)	Northern end of US 11/US 64/SR 2 concurrency; provides access to Chattanooga Metropolitan Airport
Hamilton	Chattanooga	6.7	10.8	SR 17 north (Willow Street)	Southern end of SR 17 concurrency
Hamilton	Chattanooga	8.6	13.8	SR 8 north (Market Street)	Northern end of SR 8 concurrency
Hamilton	Chattanooga	8.8	14.2	US 72 east / US 76 west (Broad Street)	Eastern terminus of US 72; southern end of US 72 concurrency; western terminus of US 76; northern end of US 76 concurrency
Hamilton	Chattanooga	9.2	14.8	US 11 north / US 64 east / SR 58 (West 20th Street/SR 2 west)	Southern end of US 11/US 64/SR 2 concurrency
Hamilton	Chattanooga	9.3– 9.4	15.0– 15.1	US 27 north (I-124 north/SR 27 west/SR 29 north) – Downtown, Red Bank	Northbound exit and southbound entrance
Hamilton	Chattanooga	10.6	17.1	SR 17 south (Tennessee Avenue) – Incline, Rock City	Northern end of SR 17 concurrency
Hamilton	Chattanooga	10.9	17.5	SR 148 south (Lookout Mountain Parkway) – Lookout Mountain	
Hamilton	Chattanooga	12.5	20.1	SR 318 south (Old Wauhatchie Pike) – Lookout Mountain	
Hamilton	Chattanooga	14.2	22.9	US 11 south (Birmingham Highway/SR 38 south)	Northern end of US 11 concurrency; northern terminus of unsigned SR 38
Hamilton	Chattanooga	14.3– 14.5	23.0– 23.3	I-24 – Chattanooga, Nashville	Exit 174 on I-24
Marion	Haletown	28.7	46.2	SR 134 east (J.E. Clouse Highway) – Wildwood	Western terminus of SR 134
Marion		29.0– 29.3	46.7– 47.2	Marion Memorial Bridge over the Tennessee River	
Marion		31.4	50.5	SR 27 (Griffith Highway) – Powells Crossroads	South to I-24 Exit 158
Marion		32.4	52.1	Hancock Road - Marion County Airport	
Marion	Jasper	33.8– 33.9	54.4– 54.6	Marion County Veterans Bridge over the Sequatchie River	
Marion	Jasper	34.5	55.5	SR 28 south (SR 27 east) to I-24 US 64 west / US 72 west (Main Street/SR 2 west/SR 27 west) – Kimball, South Pittsburg	Interchange; northern end of US 64/US 72/SR 2 concurrency; southern end of SR 28 concurrency
Marion	Jasper	35.4	57.0	SR 28 north – Whitwell	Northern end of SR 28 concurrency; southern terminus of unsigned SR 150; southern end of SR 150 concurrency
Marion	Jasper	36.4	58.6	Betsy Pack Drive/Valley View Drive - Downtown, Sequatchie	former US 41/SR 150 (Betsy Pack Drive); former SR 28 (Valley View Drive)
Marion	South Cumberland State Park	43.5	70.0	Denny Cove (South Cumberland State Park) main entrance	Gravel access road into park
Marion	South Cumberland State Park	44.9	72.3	Foster Falls Recreation Area (South Cumberland State Park) main entrance	Access road into park
Grundy	Tracy City	50.8	81.8	Lakes Road - Grundy Lakes (South Cumberland State Park)	
Grundy	Tracy City	51.8	83.4	SR 56 north (Clair Street) – Coalmont, Altamont	South end of unsigned SR 56 concurrency; northern end of unsigned SR 150 concurrency; western terminus of unsigned SR 150
Grundy	Tracy City	52.6	84.7	3rd Street - Fiery Gizzard / Grundy Forest State Natural Area (South Cumberland State Park)	
Grundy	South Cumberland State Park	54.8	88.2	South Cumberland State Park visitor center	
Grundy	Monteagle	57.3	92.2	Dixie Lee Avenue (SR 2 west)	Southern end of unsigned SR 2 concurrency
Grundy	Monteagle	58.1	93.5	US 41A north (Main Street/SR 15 west/SR 56 south) – Sewanee	Northern end of unsigned SR 56 concurrency; southern terminus of US 41A; eastern terminus of unsigned SR 15
Grundy	Pelham	64.9	104.4	SR 50 (Payne Cove Road) – Decherd, Altamont	West to I-24/US 64 Exit 127
Coffee	Hillsboro	74.0	119.1	SR 127 (Winchester Highway) – Winchester, Viola	
Coffee	Manchester	79.3– 79.6	127.6– 128.1	I-24 – Chattanooga, Nashville	Exit 114 on I-24
Coffee	Manchester	81.6	131.3	SR 55 (McArthur Street/McMinnville Highway) – Lynchburg, McMinnville	
Coffee	Manchester	82.5– 82.6	132.8– 132.9	Bridge over the Little Duck River	
Coffee	Manchester	82.7	133.1	SR 53 north (Woodbury Highway) – Woodbury	Southern terminus of SR 53
Coffee	Manchester	88.5	142.4	Stone Fort Drive - Old Stone Fort State Archaeological Park	
Coffee	Manchester	88.6	142.6	Veterans Memorial Bridge over the Duck River	
Coffee	Busy Corner	87.9– 88.1	141.5– 141.8	I-24 – Chattanooga, Nashville	Exit 105 on I-24
Coffee	Beechgrove	94.3	151.8	SR 280 east (McBrides Branch Road)	Western terminus of SR 280
Coffee	Beechgrove	95.8	154.2	SR 64 (Beech Grove Road/Gossburg Road) – Shelbyville, Wartrace, Bradyville	
Rutherford	Murfreesboro	112.5	181.1	SR 99 east (Bradyville Pike) – Bradyville	Southern end of SR 99 concurrency
Rutherford	Murfreesboro	112.6	181.2	US 70S east (Mercury Boulevard/SR 1 east)	Southern end of US 70S/SR 1 concurrency; western terminus of SR 2
Rutherford	Murfreesboro	113.1	182.0	US 231 south (S Church Street/SR 10 south)	Southern end of US 231/SR 10 concurrency
Rutherford	Murfreesboro	113.7– 113.8	183.0– 183.1	US 231 north (Memorial Boulevard/SR 10 north) / SR 96 / SR 99 west (Old Fort Parkway) – Lebanon, Triune	Northern end of US 231/SR 10/SR 99 concurrency; interchange
Rutherford	Murfreesboro	115.9– 116.0	186.5– 186.7	Bridge over the West Fork of the Stones River	
Rutherford	Murfreesboro	116.1	186.8	SR 268 east (N Thompson Lane); S Thompson Lane - Stones River National Battlefield main entrance	Western terminus of SR 268
Rutherford	Murfreesboro	116.5	187.5	Van Cleve Lane - McFadden Farm (Stones River National Battlefield)	
Rutherford	Murfreesboro	118.0– 118.9	189.9– 191.4	I-840 – Knoxville, Chattanooga	Exits 55A-B on I-840; former SR 840
Rutherford	Smyrna	122.8– 123.4	197.6– 198.6	SR 102 (Lee Victory Parkway/Nissan Drive)	Interchange
Rutherford	Smyrna	126.2– 126.6	203.1– 203.7	SR 266 (Sam Ridley Parkway)	Interchange; provides access to Smyrna Airport
Davidson	Antioch	131.8	212.1	SR 171 (Old Hickory Boulevard/Hobson Pike) – Mount Juliet	
Davidson	Antioch	134.4	216.3	SR 254 west (Bell Road) – Brentwood	Eastern terminus of SR 254
Davidson	Nashville	137.6	221.4	SR 255 (Donelson Pike) – Oak Hill, Donelson	Provides access to Nashville International Airport
Davidson	Nashville	138.2– 138.4	222.4– 222.7	Tunnel under Nashville International Airport	
Davidson	Nashville	139.3– 139.5	224.2– 224.5	SR 155 (Briley Parkway)	Exit 4; single-point urban interchange; beltway around Nashville
Davidson	Nashville	140.5	226.1	Bridge over Mill Creek	
Davidson	Nashville	141.2– 141.5	227.2– 227.7	I-24 / I-40 – Chattanooga, Nashville, Knoxville	Exit 52 on I-24; exit 213 on I-40 (westbound only)
Davidson	Nashville	143.8– 144.1	231.4– 231.9	I-40 / US 31A south / US 41A south (2nd Avenue S/4th Avenue S/SR 11 south)	Southern end of US 31A/US 41A/SR 11 concurrency from one-way pair; exit 210C on I-40
Davidson	Nashville	144.6	232.7	US 31 south (8th Avenue S/SR 6 south)	Southern end of US 31/SR 6 concurrency; traffic circle; northern terminus of US 31A
Davidson	Nashville	144.9	233.2	US 70 / US 70S west / US 431 south (Broadway/SR 24/SR 1 west)	Northern end of US 70S/SR 1 concurrency; southern end of US 431 concurrency
Davidson	Nashville	145.5	234.2	US 41A north (Rosa L. Parks Boulevard/SR 12 north)	Northern end of US 41A concurrency; southern terminus of unsigned SR 12
Davidson	Nashville	146.2– 146.6	235.3– 235.9	Victory Memorial Bridge over the Cumberland River	
Davidson	Nashville	146.8– 147.2	236.3– 236.9	US 31W north (Spring Street) / US 31E north (Ellington Parkway/SR 6 north) / South 5th Street/Main Street to I-24	Northern end of US 31 concurrency; US 31 splits into US 31E and US 31W; south end of US 31W concurrency; interchange
Davidson	Nashville	147.4	237.2	To I-24 / I-65 / Spring Street	
Davidson	Nashville	149.5	240.6	US 431 north (West Trinity Lane/SR 65 north) to I-65	Northern end of US 431 concurrency; southern terminus of unsigned SR 65
Davidson	Nashville	151.7– 151.9	244.1– 244.5	I-65 – Nashville, Louisville	Southbound off-ramp from SR 155 off-ramp; exit 90A on I-65
Davidson	Nashville	152.0– 152.1	244.6– 244.8	SR 155 (Briley Parkway)	No eastbound on-ramp (must use northbound I-65 on-ramp); exit 16B
Davidson	Nashville	154.0	247.8	SR 45 (Old Hickory Boulevard) – Whites Creek, Old Hickory, Madison	
Davidson	Goodlettsville	158.1	254.4	Rivergate Parkway east to I-65 – Madison	Western terminus of Rivergate Parkway; provides access to Rivergate Mall
Davidson	Goodlettsville	158.6	255.2	SR 174 east (Long Hollow Pike)	Western terminus of SR 174
Sumner	Goodlettsville	159.9– 160.2	257.3– 257.8	US 31W north (SR 41 north) to I-65 – Millersville, White House	Northern end of US 31W concurrency; southern terminus of unsigned SR 41; trumpet interchange
Davidson	No major junctions				
Robertson	Ridgetop	165.1	265.7	SR 257 (Greer Road/Woodruff Avenue) to I-65	
Robertson	Springfield	174.0	280.0	US 431 south (Tom Austin Highway/SR 65 south) – Whites Creek	Southern end of SR 431 concurrency
Robertson	Springfield	175.2	282.0	SR 49 / SR 76 east (Fifth Avenue) to I-24 / I-65 – Pleasant View, Orlinda, White House	Southern end of SR 76 concurrency
Robertson	Springfield	176.7	284.4	US 431 north (Memorial Boulevard/SR 65 north) – Adairville	Northern end of SR 431 concurrency
Robertson		178.7	287.6	Airport Road - Springfield Robertson County Airport	
Robertson	Adams	187.8	302.2	SR 76 west (South Church Street) – Clarksville	Northern end of SR 76 concurrency
Robertson		189.2	304.5	Russell B Corbin Memorial Bridge over the Red River	
Montgomery		194.58	313.15	US 41 north (State Street) – Guthrie, Hopkinsville	Continuation into Kentucky; northern terminus of unsigned SR 11
1.000 mi = 1.609 km; 1.000 km = 0.621 mi: Concurrency terminus; Incomplete access

== State Route 150 ==
State Route 150
- Location: Jasper-Tracy City
- Length: 20.98 mi (33.76 km)

State Route 150 (SR 150) is a 20.98-mile-long (33.76 km) unsigned companion route for US 41 between Jasper and Tracy City. SR 150 was originally signed along its route while US 41 followed what is now I-24, and the original Dixie Highway, over Monteagle Mountain. When I-24 was routed over the mountain, TDOT rerouted US 41 over SR 150, and removed SR 150 signage at that time except for mile markers, which still remain to this day.

U.S. Route 41
Previous state: Georgia	Tennessee	Next state: Kentucky
