= Tennessee State Route 8 =

Highway in Tennessee

State Route 8
- SR 8; primary in red, secondary in blue, unsigned in green

Route information
- Maintained by TDOT
- Length: 75.43 mi (121.39 km)
- Existed: October 1, 1923–present

Major junctions
- South end: US 41 / US 76 / SR 3 at the Georgia State Line in East Ridge
- I-75 in East Ridge; I-24 in Chattanooga; US 11 / US 64 in Chattanooga; US 27 / US 127 in Red Bank; SR 27 in Signal Mountain; US 127 / SR 28 / SR 111 in Dunlap
- North end: SR 56 in McMinnville

Location
- Country: United States
- State: Tennessee
- Counties: Hamilton, Sequatchie, Van Buren, Warren

Highway system
- Tennessee State Routes; Interstate; US; State
← SR 7	→ SR 9

State Route 8 (SR 8) is a 75.43-mile-long (121.39 km) north–south state highway in East and Middle Tennessee. It connects the cities of Chattanooga and McMinnville via Signal Mountain and Dunlap.

== Route description ==
=== Hamilton County ===
SR 8 begins in Hamilton County as the unsigned companion route to US 41/US 76 at the Georgia state line in East Ridge, where they continue concurrent with Georgia State Route 3. As Ringgold Road, they head west and have an interchange with I-75 and go through downtown before passing through the Bachman Tubes and entering Chattanooga, where it becomes Westside Drive and having an interchange with I-24. They then come to an intersection and become concurrent with US 11/US 64/SR 2 (E 23rd Street) and head north on Dodds Avenue. They pass through neighborhoods before US 41/US 76/SR 8 split from US 11/US 64/SR 2 (Dodds Avenue) and then heads east along E Main Street. SR 17 joins the concurrency from S Willow Street before SR 8 splits off and heads north along Broad Street. The route enters downtown as a signed secondary highway, joining SR 316 (M L King Boulevard) to head east one block over to continue north on Market Street. SR 8 becomes unsigned again and has an intersection with SR 389 (W 4th Street) before crossing the Tennessee River (via the Market Street Bridge) and following Cherokee Boulevard to Signal Mountain Road. SR 8 then has an interchange with US 27/SR 29/SR 27, at the southern terminus of US 127, at which it becomes concurrent with SR 27, in Red Bank, with SR 8 remaining unsigned. SR 27 splits off at Suck Creek Road before US 127/SR 8 wind their way up a mountain that is part of Walden Ridge to pass through the town of Signal Mountain. US 127/SR 8 then go through Walden and Fairmount before crossing into Sequatchie County as well as the Central Time Zone.

=== Sequatchie County ===
US 127/SR 8 then go through Lone Oak before meandering down a mountainside into the Sequatchie Valley and entering Center Point, where they intersect SR 283. US 127/SR 8 then enter Dunlap and have an intersection with SR 28, which becomes the unsigned companion route of US 127. They go north through downtown before coming to an interchange with SR 111, where SR 8 separates from US 127/SR 28 and follows that route, becoming signed for the first time as a primary highway. SR 111/SR 8 leave Dunlap and wind their way through a narrow valley, ascending the main part of the Cumberland Plateau on a steep grade to Cagle and have an intersection with SR 399. SR 8 soon leaves SR 111 and heads northwestward to enter Van Buren County.

=== Van Buren and Warren Counties ===
SR 8 shortly runs through a remote area of Van Buren County before crossing into Warren County. It then runs through some farmland and crosses the Collins River before junctioning with SR 127 and entering McMinnville. SR 8 then comes to an end at an intersection with SR 56 just west of downtown.

== Major junctions ==
County	Location	mi	km	Destinations	Notes
Hamilton	East Ridge	0.0	0.0	US 41 south / US 76 east (Old Dixie Highway/SR 3 south) – Ringgold	Georgia state line; southern terminus; southern end of US 41/US 76 concurrency; SR 8 begins as an unsigned secondary highway
Hamilton	East Ridge			I-75 to I-24 – Knoxville, Atlanta	I-75 exit 1 southbound and 1A/B northbound
Hamilton	East Ridge–Chattanooga line			Bachman Tubes under Missionary Ridge	
Hamilton	Chattanooga			I-24 west – Nashville	I-24 exit 181A; eastbound exit and westbound entrance on I-24
Hamilton	Chattanooga			US 64 west / US 11 south (E 23rd Street/SR 2 west)	Southern end of US 64/US 11/SR 2 concurrency
Hamilton	Chattanooga			US 64 east / US 11 north (Dodds Avenue/SR 2)	Northern end of US 64/US 11/SR 2 concurrency; provides access to Chattanooga Metropolitan Airport
Hamilton	Chattanooga			SR 17 north (S Willow Street)	Southern end of SR 17 concurrency
Hamilton	Chattanooga			US 41 north / US 76 west / SR 17 south (W Main Street) to I-24 / US 27	Northern end of US 41/US 76/SR 17 concurrency; SR 8 becomes signed
Hamilton	Chattanooga			SR 316 (M L King Boulevard) to US 27 west	Eastern terminus of SR 316
Hamilton	Chattanooga			SR 389 west (W 4th Street) to US 27	Eastern terminus of SR 389
Hamilton	Chattanooga			Market Street Bridge (Chief John Ross Bridge) over Tennessee River	
Hamilton	Chattanooga–Red Bank line			Stringer's Ridge Tunnel; SR 8 changes from Cherokee Boulevard to Dayton Boulevard	
Hamilton	Red Bank			US 27 south – Downtown	Southbound exit and northbound entrance
Hamilton	Red Bank			Dayton Boulevard (Old US 27/SR 29) - Hixson	SR 8 turns west from Dayton Boulevard to Signal Mountain Road
Hamilton	Red Bank			US 27 / US 127 begins (SR 27 east/SR 29) – Chattanooga, Dayton	Interchange; southern terminus of US 127; southern end of US 127/SR 27 concurrency; SR 8 becomes unsigned
Hamilton	Signal Mountain			SR 27 west (Cherokee Trail) – Powells Crossroads, Jasper	Northern end of SR 27 concurrency
Sequatchie	Center Point			SR 283 south (East Valley Road) – Powells Crossroads, Whitwell	Northern terminus of SR 283
Sequatchie				Bridge over the Sequatchie River	
Sequatchie	Dunlap			SR 28 south – Whitwell, Jasper	Southern end of unsigned SR 28 concurrency; SR 8 becomes a primary route
Sequatchie	Dunlap			US 127 north (Rankin Avenue/SR 28 north) / SR 111 south – Pikeville, Chattanooga	Interchange; northern end of US 127/SR 28 concurrency; southern end of SR 111 concurrency; SR 8 becomes signed
Sequatchie	Cagle			SR 399 west (Rifle Range Road) – Gruetli-Laager, Palmer	Eastern terminus of SR 399; provides access to Savage Gulf State Natural Area (South Cumberland State Park)
Sequatchie				SR 111 north (Artillery Road) – Spencer	Northern end of SR 111 concurrency
Van Buren	No major junctions				
Warren				Bridge over the Collins River	
Warren				SR 127 (Shellsford Road) – Sparta, Viola	
Warren	McMinnville	75.43	121.39	SR 56 (Beersheba Highway) – Downtown, Beersheba Springs, Altamont	Northern terminus; SR 8 ends as a signed primary highway
1.000 mi = 1.609 km; 1.000 km = 0.621 mi: Concurrency terminus; Incomplete access; Route transition

== See also ==
- List of state routes in Tennessee
