= Project K-9 Hero =

- Formation: 2016
- Founder: Jason Johnson
- Type: Nonprofit organization
- Headquarters: Whitwell, Tennessee, United States
- Website: projectk9hero.org

Project K-9 Hero is an American nonprofit organization based in Whitwell, Tennessee. It supports retired police dogs and military working dogs and operates a rehabilitation and rehoming facility in Whitwell, Tennessee.

== History ==
Project K-9 Hero was founded in 2016 after Jason Johnson's work in military, police, and federal K-9 programs led him to focus on the lack of retirement support for working dogs. Flash, a retired police dog, known for association with Johnson, became the inspiration for the project.

In 2022, Johnson and the organization were featured on PBS's American Anthems. By 2023, it developed a 177-acre rehabilitation and rehoming facility in Marion County, Tennessee. In the same year, it arranged adoptions and lifetime care for former working dogs, including the former military dog Blek and Transportation Security Administration dog Suzi.

Project K-9 Hero has supported policy proposals concerning medical funding and legal protections for retired and injured working dogs, including federal legislation on retired military working dogs and Michigan's proposed Dozer's Law. In 2024, it also donated funds to the Sequatchie County Sheriff's Office for the acquisition and training of a dual trained K-9 for narcotics detection and tracking.

As of 2024, retired search and rescue dog Remington was the ambassador for the organization.

== Operations ==
Project K-9 Hero programs focus on covering or offsetting lifetime medical expenses for retired working dogs after agency support ends at retirement. It also provides prescription food, rehabilitation, rehoming, and end of duty services. Dogs accepted into the program may remain at the rehabilitation center in Tennessee until a long term placement is found.
