= Tennessee State Route 97 =

State highway in Tennessee, United States

State Route 97
- SR 97 highlighted in red

Route information
- Maintained by TDOT
- Length: 5.64 mi (9.08 km)

Major junctions
- South end: SR 65 at the Alabama state line in Francisco, AL
- North end: SR 122 in Huntland

Location
- Country: United States
- State: Tennessee
- Counties: Franklin

Highway system
- Tennessee State Routes; Interstate; US; State
← SR 96	→ SR 98

State Route 97 (SR 97) is a rural state highway located entirely in Franklin County in southern Middle Tennessee.

== Route description ==
SR 97 begins at the Alabama state line where it transitions from being Alabama State Route 65 north of Francisco, Alabama, in Jackson County, which connects SR 97 to a junction with U.S. Route 72 (US 72) located 26 miles (42 km) south of the state line.

SR 97 traverses mainly rural areas of southwestern Franklin County as its northern terminus is located at Huntland with a junction with SR 122 just south of that route's intersection with US 64 (SR 15).

== Major intersections ==
The entire route is in Franklin County.

Location	mi	km	Destinations	Notes
	0.00	0.00	SR 65 south – Skyline, Paint Rock	Southern terminus at Alabama state line
Huntland	5.64	9.08	SR 122 (Main Street/John Hunter Highway) to US 64 – Winchester, Elora	Northern terminus
1.000 mi = 1.609 km; 1.000 km = 0.621 mi
