= Tennessee State Route 121 =

State highway in Tennessee, United States

State Route 121
- SR 121; primary in red, secondary in blue

Route information
- Maintained by TDOT
- Length: 20.55 mi (33.07 km)

Major junctions
- South end: CR 65 at the Alabama state line near Elora
- SR 122 in Elora; US 64 near Flintville
- North end: SR 50 in Broadview

Location
- Country: United States
- State: Tennessee
- Counties: Lincoln, Franklin

Highway system
- Tennessee State Routes; Interstate; US; State
← SR 120	→ SR 122

State Route 121 (SR 121) is a 20.55-mile-long (33.07 km) north–south state highway in Middle Tennessee. It connects Elora with Broadview, Tims Ford Lake, and the state of Alabama.

== Route description ==
SR 121 begins as a primary highway in Lincoln County at the Alabama state line, where it continues south as Madison County Route 65. It goes northeast through farmland to enter Elora, where it has an intersection with SR 122. The highway then turns northward to leave Elora and pass through farmland for a few miles to come to an intersection with US 64/SR 15. SR 121 turns into a secondary highway as it has a short concurrency with US 64/SR 15 before turning northeast and winding its way through hilly terrain as it parallels the Elk River to cross into Franklin County. The highway continues northeast through farmland to enter Broadview and come to an end at an intersection with SR 50.

Excluding the concurrency with US 64/SR 15, the entire route of SR 121 is a two-lane highway.

== Major intersections ==
County	Location	mi	km	Destinations	Notes
Lincoln		0.0	0.0	CR 65 south (Winchester Road) – New Market	Alabama state line; southern terminus; SR 121 begins as a primary highway
Lincoln	Elora	2.5	4.0	SR 122 east (John Hunter Highway) – Huntland	Western terminus of SR 122; SR 121 turns secondary
Lincoln		6.9	11.1	US 64 west (Winchester Highway/SR 15 west) – Fayetteville	Southern end of US 64/SR 15 concurrency
Lincoln		7.1	11.4	US 64 east (Winchester Highway/SR 15 east) – Winchester	Northern end of US 64/SR 15 concurrency
Franklin	Broadview	20.55	33.07	SR 50 (Lynchburg Road) – Lynchburg, Winchester	Northern terminus; SR 121 ends as a secondary highway
1.000 mi = 1.609 km; 1.000 km = 0.621 mi: Concurrency terminus
