= No. 21 Mine explosion =

1981 coal mine explosion

Coordinates: 35.271°N 85.561°W

On December 8, 1981, 13 coal miners lost their lives as the result of an explosion at the No. 21 Mine, an underground coal mine near Whitwell, Tennessee.

The mine was owned by the Tennessee Consolidated Coal Company and operated by a subsidiary, the Grundy Mining Company.

A U.S. Mine Safety and Health Administration investigation determined that the explosion occurred when a miner's cigarette lighter ignited a pocket of methane gas. Investigators found the mine operator at fault for failing to adequately ventilate the mineshaft, failing to evacuate workers from an area with high methane levels, and failing to effectively enforce regulations that banned smoking materials in mines.

In the 1983 settlement of a lawsuit, the mine owners agreed to pay a total of about $10 million to the survivors of ten of the 13 miners who were killed. The No. 21 Mine closed in 1997.
