= Hillis Layne =

American baseball player (1918-2010)

- Third baseman
- Born: February 23, 1918; Whitwell, Tennessee, U.S.
- Died: January 12, 2010 (aged 91); Signal Mountain, Tennessee, U.S.
- Batted: Left Threw: Right

MLB debut
- September 16, 1941,, for the Washington Senators

Last MLB appearance
- September 21, 1945,, for the Washington Senators

MLB statistics
- Batting average: .264
- Hits: 75
- Runs scored: 37
- Stats at Baseball Reference

Teams
- Washington Senators (1941,1944–1945)

Ivoria Hillis Layne (February 23, 1918 – January 12, 2010) was an American third baseman in Major League Baseball who played for the Washington Senators in parts of three seasons spanning 1941–1945. Listed at 6' 0", 170 lb., he batted left-handed and threw right-handed.

Born in Whitwell, Tennessee, Layne was one of many major leaguers who saw his baseball career interrupted by a stint in the army during World War II. Signed by the legendary pitcher Joe Engel to play for the Senators organization, Layne played for the Chattanooga Lookouts before being called up to the big team in September 1941. Overall, he spent 37 years in professional baseball, including 17 in the Minor Leagues, while losing 2¾ years to the Military (1942–1944) . After being discharged from military service, he played in parts of the 1944 and 1945 seasons.

In a three-season career, Layne was a .264 hitter (75-for-284) with one home run and 28 RBI in 107 games, including 37 runs, nine doubles, four triples, three stolen bases, and a .321 on-base percentage.

Following his majors career, Layne led the Pacific Coast League hitters in 1947 with a .367 average. Then, from 1955 through 1958 he served as a player/manager for the Lewiston Broncs of the Northwest League, winning the batting title in 1955 (.391) while ending second in both 1956 (.354) and 1957 (.340).

In four NWL seasons, he collected a .362 average with a .468 OBP and led the league's third basemen in fielding percentage during three consecutive seasons (1955–1957).

In 1,796 minor league games, he hit .335 with 83 home runs and 953 RBI. He later scouted for the Texas Rangers. In 1987, he was inducted into the Tennessee Sports Hall of Fame.

Layne died January 12, 2010, of a heart attack suffered two days earlier. He is interred at Chattanooga National Cemetery in Chattanooga, Tennessee.
