= Tennessee State Route 17 =

State highway in Tennessee, United States

State Route 17
- SR 17; secondary in red, unsigned in blue

Route information
- Maintained by TDOT
- Length: 12.6 mi (20.3 km)
- Existed: October 1, 1923–present

Major junctions
- South end: SR 193 at Tennessee–Georgia state line at Lookout Mountain
- I-24 in Chattanooga; US 41 / US 76 in Chattanooga
- North end: SR 58 / SR 153 / SR 317 in Chattanooga

Location
- Country: United States
- State: Tennessee
- Counties: Hamilton

Highway system
- Tennessee State Routes; Interstate; US; State
← SR 16	→ SR 18

State Route 17 (SR 17) is a secondary state highway entirely within the city of Chattanooga, in Hamilton County, Tennessee.

== Route description ==
SR 17 begins at the northern terminus of Georgia State Route 193 (SR 193) at the Tennessee-Georgia State line in the city of Chattanooga's historic Saint Elmo neighborhood. It meets, and briefly merges with SR 58. It then continues north to US 11/US 41/US 64/US 72 where it begins a 1.5-mile-long (2.4 km) concurrency with US 11/US 64 and a 3.9-mile-long (6.3 km) concurrency with US 41.

Just past the US 11/US 41/US 64/US 72 junction, SR 17 intersects with Interstate 24 (I-24). It then continues northward to where US 11 and US 64 turn west onto East 20th Street and US 41/US 72/SR 17 continue north along Broad Street. At intersection US 72 continues northward while US 41/SR 17 and US 76 turn eastward onto West Main Street. Here SR 17 begins a concurrency with US 76.

The three routes continue eastward along West Main Street to South Willow Street where SR 17 turns north on the aforementioned street and US 41/US 76 continues eastward. It then proceeds northward through the neighborhoods of west-central and north-west Chattanooga before coming to an end at SR 58/SR 153/SR 317.

== Major intersections ==
The entire route is in Chattanooga, Hamilton County.

mi	km	Destinations	Notes
0.00	0.00	SR 193 – Chattanooga Valley	Southern terminus of SR 17; continuation south into Georgia
		SR 58 south (Ochs Highway) – Lookout Mountain, Rock City	Southern end of SR 58 overlap
		SR 58 north (Tennessee Avenue)	Northern end of SR 58 overlap
		US 11 / US 41 / US 64 / US 72 (Lee Highway/SR 2) – Jasper	Southern end of US 11/US 41/US 64/US 72/SR 2 overlap
		US 27 north (I-124/SR 27/SR 29) – Soddy-Daisy	Ramp to US 27 North
		US 11 north / US 64 east (20th Street/SR 2) to I-24	Northern end of US 11/US 64/SR 2 overlap
		SR 8 north (Broad Street)	End US 72; End US 76; Southern end of US 76/SR 8 overlap
		SR 58 (Market Street) – Lookout Mountain	
		US 41 south / US 76 east (West Main Street/SR 8)	Northern end of US 41 wrong-way concurrency; Northern end of US 76 concurrency
		SR 317 east (Bonny Oaks Drive)	Western terminus of SR 317
		SR 58 / SR 153 – Soddy-Daisy, Harrison	Northern terminus; SR 153 exit 5 A/B; Interchange with SR 153 North & South/SR 58 South; Road continues Eastward as SR 58 North
1.000 mi = 1.609 km; 1.000 km = 0.621 mi: Concurrency terminus; Incomplete access
