= Tennessee State Route 122 =

Road in the USA

State Route 122
- John Hunter Highway
- TN 122 highlighted in red

Route information
- Maintained by TDOT
- Length: 7.11 mi (11.44 km)

Major junctions
- West end: SR 121 in Elora
- SR 97 In Huntland
- East end: US 64 in Huntland

Location
- Country: United States
- State: Tennessee
- Counties: Lincoln, Franklin

Highway system
- Tennessee State Routes; Interstate; US; State
← SR 121	→ SR 123

State Route 122 (SR 122) is a 7.11-mile-long (11.44 km) east–west state highway in Middle Tennessee. It connects the town of Huntland with the community of Elora. For the majority of its length, SR 122 is known as John Hunter Highway.

== Route description ==
SR 122 begins in Lincoln County in Elora at an intersection with SR 121. It heads northeast as John Hunter Highway through farmland and rural countryside for several miles to cross into Franklin County. SR 122 then enters Huntland, where it comes to an intersection with SR 97. The highway turns north along Main Street and passes by several homes and businesses to come to an end at an intersection with US 64/SR 15. The entire route of SR 122 is a two-lane highway.

== Major intersections ==
County	Location	mi	km	Destinations	Notes
Lincoln	Elora	0.0	0.0	SR 121 (John Hunter Highway/Elora Road) – New Market, AL, Broadview	Western terminus
Franklin	Huntland	5.8	9.3	SR 97 south (Main Street) – Skyline, AL	Northern terminus of SR 97
Franklin	Huntland	7.11	11.44	US 64 (David Crockett Highway/SR 15) – Fayetteville, Winchester	Eastern terminus
1.000 mi = 1.609 km; 1.000 km = 0.621 mi
