= Tennessee State Route 283 =

State highway in Tennessee, United States

State Route 283
- SR 283; primary in red, secondary in blue

Route information
- Maintained by TDOT
- Length: 13.6 mi (21.9 km)
- Existed: July 1, 1983–present

Major junctions
- South end: SR 28 in Whitwell
- SR 27 in Powells Crossroads
- North end: US 127 just south of Dunlap

Location
- Country: United States
- State: Tennessee
- Counties: Marion, Sequatchie

Highway system
- Tennessee State Routes; Interstate; US; State
| ← SR 282 | → SR 284 |

State Route 283 (SR 283) is a north–south state highway in the Sequatchie Valley of southwestern East Tennessee.

== Route description ==
SR 283 begins as a primary highway in Marion County in the southern part of Whitwell at an intersection with SR 28. It travels east to cross the Sequatchie River to leave Whitwell and travels through rural areas. The highway then enters Powells Crossroads and has an intersection with SR 27 at the center of town. SR 283 then turns secondary and turns northward to leave Powells Crossroads. It continues north through farmland to cross into Sequatchie County. It continues northeast, now running parallel to the Sequatchie River, for several miles before coming to an end at an intersection with US 127/SR 8 just south of Dunlap.

== Major intersections ==
| County | Location | mi | km | Destinations | Notes |
|---|---|---|---|---|---|
| Marion | Whitwell | 0.0 | 0.0 | SR 28 (Hudson Street) – Jasper, Dunlap | Southern terminus; SR 283 begins as a primary highway |
| Marion | Whitwell | | | Bridge over the Sequatchie River | |
| Marion | Powells Crossroads | | | SR 27 (Suck Creek Road/Griffith Highway) to I-24 – Signal Mountain | SR 283 turns secondary |
| Sequatchie | | 13.6 | 21.9 | US 127 (Taft Highway/SR 8) – Dunlap, Fairmount, Signal Mountain | Northern terminus; SR 283 ends as a secondary highway |
1.000 mi = 1.609 km; 1.000 km = 0.621 mi
