= Huntland, Tennessee =

- Town
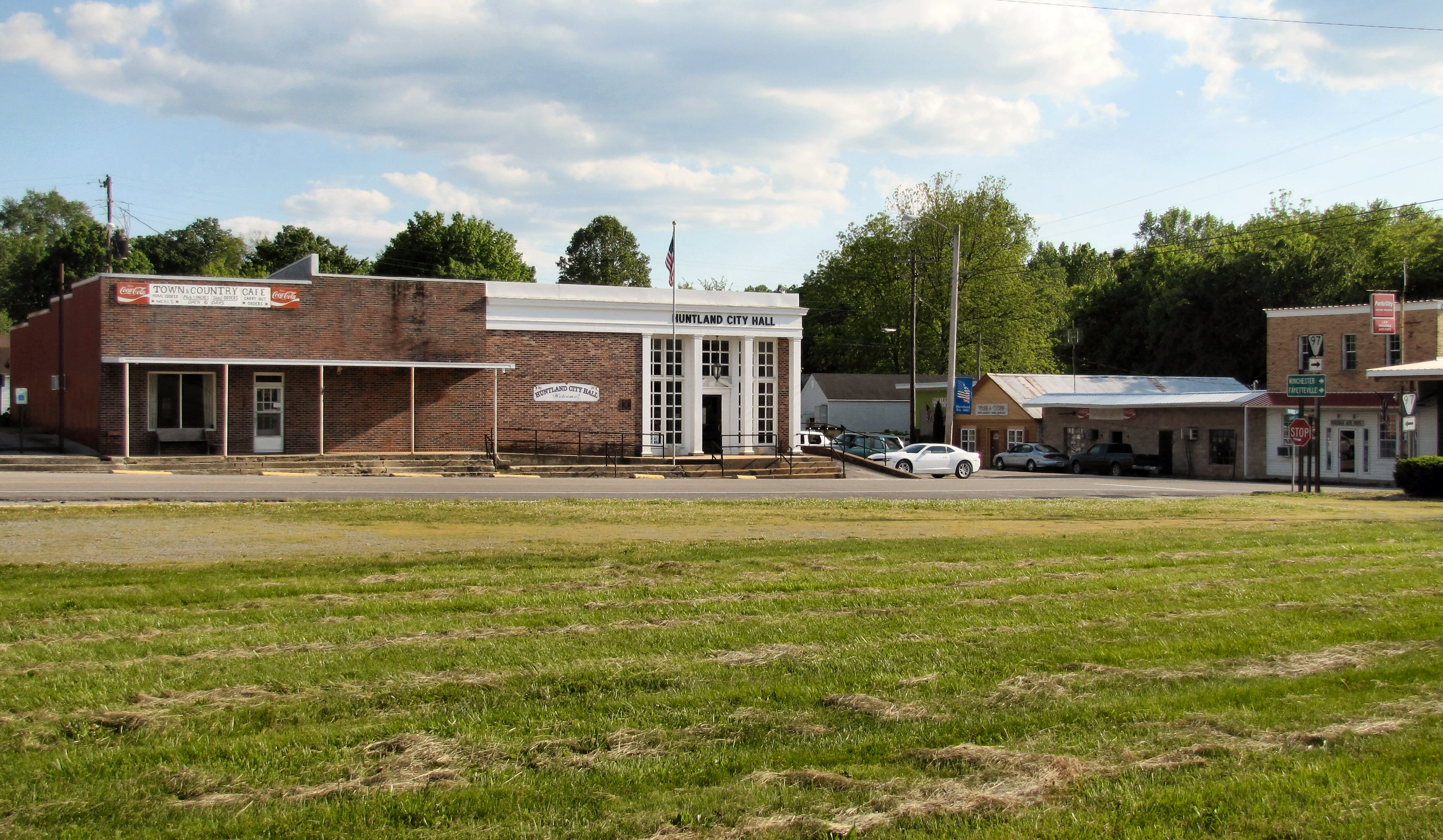
- City Hall (2015)

- Location within Franklin County and Tennessee
- Coordinates: 35°3′4.31″N 86°16′10.96″W
- Country: United States
- State: Tennessee
- County: Franklin
- Incorporated: 1907

Area
  - Total: 1.53 sq mi (3.95 km^{2})
  - Land: 1.53 sq mi (3.95 km^{2})
  - Water: 0 sq mi (0.00 km^{2})
- Elevation: 938 ft (286 m)

Population (2020)
  - Total: 886
  - Density: 581/sq mi (224/km^{2})
- Time zone: UTC−6 (CST)
  - Summer (DST): UTC−5 (CDT)
- ZIP Code: 37345
- Area code: 931
- FIPS code: 47-36600
- GNIS ID: 1288762
- Website: huntlandtn.gov

Huntland is a town in Franklin County, Tennessee, United States. The population was 872 at the 2010 census and 886 at the 2020 census.

== History ==
The town was established in the early 1900s, and is named after an early settler, Clinton Armstrong Hunt. It was incorporated in 1907.

William L. Pogue was a founding and charter member of the Huntland Baptist Church built in 1915. Also, Farmer Pogue operated Pogue's General Store in Bean's Creek from 1925 to 1936.

== Geography ==
Huntland is located at 35°3′13″N 86°16′7″W (35.053508, -86.268678). The town is situated primarily around the intersection of State Route 122 and State Route 97, though its boundaries stretch northward to the intersection of State Route 122 and U.S. Route 64. State Route 122 continues southwestward to Elora, Tennessee, while State Route 97 continues southward into Alabama.

The town of Huntland is a rural community in Middle Tennessee located in the Appalachian foothills of the southwest part of Franklin County. Huntland lies 12 miles south of Winchester, the county seat; 22 miles east of Fayetteville, the Lincoln County seat; 35 miles north of Huntsville, Alabama; and 100 miles south of Nashville, Tennessee’s state capitol.

Huntland has one of the county’s high schools, established in the very early 1900s. Huntland School educates students K-12, and presently has about 600 students enrolled. Huntland ha an elementary, middle school, and high school.

Water for the town is obtained from three wells, and an up to date filtration plant. A city park, community center, and fire hall are located in the center of the city.

According to the United States Census Bureau, the town has a total area of 1.5 square miles (3.9 km^{2}), all of it land.

== Demographics ==
Historical population
Census	Pop.	Note	%±
1920	223		—
1930	247		10.8%
1940	303		22.7%
1950	285		−5.9%
1960	500		75.4%
1970	849		69.8%
1980	983		15.8%
1990	885		−10.0%
2000	916		3.5%
2010	872		−4.8%
2020	886		1.6%

Huntland is part of the Tullahoma, Tennessee Micropolitan Statistical Area.

=== 2020 census ===
As of the 2020 United States census, there were 886 people, 353 households, and 211 families residing in the town.

Huntland racial composition
Race	Number	Percentage
White (non-Hispanic)	792	89.39%
Black or African American (non-Hispanic)	13	1.47%
Native American	4	0.45%
Asian	1	0.11%
Other/Mixed	29	3.27%
Hispanic or Latino	47	5.3%

=== 2000 census ===
As of the census of 2000, there were 916 people, 364 households, and 255 families residing in the town. The population density was 633.2 inhabitants per square mile (244.5/km^{2}). There were 395 housing units at an average density of 273.1 per square mile (105.4/km^{2}). The racial makeup of the town was 93.12% White, 2.51% African American, 1.09% Native American, 0.11% Asian, 1.64% from other races, and 1.53% from two or more races. Hispanic or Latino of any race were 2.95% of the population.

There were 364 households, out of which 29.1% had children under the age of 18 living with them, 51.4% were married couples living together, 14.0% had a female householder with no husband present, and 29.9% were non-families. 28.6% of all households were made up of individuals, and 15.4% had someone living alone who was 65 years of age or older. The average household size was 2.47 and the average family size was 3.00.

In the town, the population was spread out, with 22.6% under the age of 18, 8.6% from 18 to 24, 28.1% from 25 to 44, 23.1% from 45 to 64, and 17.6% who were 65 years of age or older. The median age was 39 years. For every 100 females, there were 90.8 males. For every 100 females age 18 and over, there were 89.6 males.

The median income for a household in the town was $30,417, and the median income for a family was $38,125. Males had a median income of $27,500 versus $21,905 for females. The per capita income for the town was $16,676. About 10.8% of families and 13.2% of the population were below the poverty line, including 19.7% of those under age 18 and 20.3% of those age 65 or over.

== Education ==
The first school, Huntland Academy was built in 1869-70 on what is now John Hunter Highway and Main Street. During this time there were no public school funds for erecting schools, buying equipment, or paying teacher salaries. Under the leadership of two teachers, Miss Mollie Setiff and Professor T.P. Brennon, community interest in Huntland Academy grew.

Soon the need for a larger building was evident. Public meetings were held and by various ways and means plans for a larger Huntland Academy were planned. Two local men who owned a timber yard and a sawmill donated the needed materials for constructing a new building. At the same time, Clinton Hunt donated land located at the corner of Alabama and College Street. The cost of the newly constructed Huntland Academy was $1000.00. The new school, completed in 1880, contained two recreation rooms and a large study hall. Faithful instructors carried on Huntland Academy until 1908 at which time education became publicly funded.

In 1907, the Franklin County Board of Education purchased two and one half acres of land for $250.00 from Gustavas Aldolphus and his wife Mary Bell Gore and her mother Mary Spenser Gore. This land at the corner of Gore and College Streets became the site of Huntland School. Construction began immediately after the purchase. A square, brick two-story building with a large belfry was designed. The new Huntland School consisted of four classrooms, a music conservatory, and two cloakrooms that were located on the first floor. An auditorium and library were on the second floor.

Huntland High School was officially established in 1912. In 1914, due to excessive growth, several classrooms were added to the back of the existing building. Again in the late twenties, an addition was needed to accommodate the growing number of students. In 1948, a gymnasium was added to the campus of Huntland School. Between 1936 and 1949 many more building additions were added including five classrooms, an agriculture shop, lunchroom, and a football stadium.

Growth in the Huntland community dictated the need for expansion. In 1960, a new elementary building was erected and again in 1969. Growth still increased and various upgrades were made over the next several years. These additions included a larger gymnasium, high school wing, upper elementary, and a larger cafeteria.

Between 2001 and 2005 many other additions were constructed on Huntland’s campus. These include a new sports complex which included football, baseball, and softball fields, an elementary gym, music/band room, and a high school wing consisting of eleven instructional classrooms. Currently Huntland Schools’ campus consists of six main buildings; K-1 elementary, 2-4 elementary, 5-8 middle school, agricultural science, high school, and a sports complex building. This totals 51 instructional classrooms.

The Huntland Hornets High School football team have appeared in the TSSAA playoffs 19 times in the years: 2020, 2019, 2018, 2014, 2011, 2006, 2004, 1999, 1998, 1996, 1995, 1992, 1991, 1990, 1989, 1988, 1987, 1985, 1982.

Huntlands girls basketball team played in a sectional game for basketball in 2023. On March 4, 2023, Huntland played the McKenzie Rebels at McKenzie but loss 57-67. This game was followed after losing the Region 5 girls championship game on Wednesday, March 1, 2023, to Wayne County and lost 52-55.
