= U.S. Route 76 in Tennessee =

Segment of American highway

U.S. Route 76
- US 76 highlighted in red

Route information
- Maintained by TDOT
- Length: 8.9 mi (14.3 km)
- Existed: 1926–present

Major junctions
- West end: US 41 / US 72 / SR 8 / SR 17 in Chattanooga
- I-24 in Chattanooga; I-75 in East Ridge
- East end: US 41 / US 76 / SR 3 at the Georgia state line east of Lakeview

Location
- Country: United States
- State: Tennessee
- Counties: Hamilton

Highway system
- United States Numbered Highway System; List; Special; Divided; Tennessee State Routes; Interstate; US; State
← SR 75	→ SR 76

U.S. Route 76 (US 76) is an east–west U.S. Highway in the state of Tennessee. Its route is almost entirely in Chattanooga.

== Route description ==
US 76 begins at an intersection with the concurrency of US 41/US 72/SR 17 (Broad Street) in downtown Chattanooga. It then goes east, running concurrently with US 41/SR 17 (as Main Street) through some industrial areas, where SR 8 (Market Street) joins the concurrency, before entering suburbs and coming to an intersection with South Willow Street, where SR 17 splits off and goes north. US 41/US 76/SR 8 then comes to an intersection with US 11/US 64/SR 2 (Dodds Avenue), where they turn south to run concurrently with those three highways for a short distance before US 11/US 64/SR 2 turns east onto East 23rd Avenue while US 41/US 76/SR 8 turns southeast onto Westside Drive and an interchange with I-24 (exit 181A). The highway then turns east again and passes through the Bachman Tubes, leaving Chattanooga and entering the City of East Ridge. It travels through the city and then meets an interchange with I-75 (exit 1) before entering Georgia, where SR 8 ends and US 41/US 76 runs concurrently with SR 3, which begins here. The entire route of US 76 in Tennessee is in Hamilton County and is concurrent with US 41 and SR 8.

== Major intersections ==
The entire route is in Hamilton County.

Location	mi	km	Destinations	Notes
Chattanooga	0.0	0.0	US 41 north / US 72 west / SR 17 south (Broad Street)	Western terminus of US 76; eastern terminus of US 72; western end of US 41/SR 17 concurrency
Chattanooga	0.2	0.32	SR 8 north (Market Street)	Western end of SR 8 concurrency
Chattanooga	2.1	3.4	SR 17 north (Willow Street)	Eastern end of SR 17 concurrency
Chattanooga	2.6	4.2	US 11 north / US 64 east (Dodds Avenue/SR 2 east)	Western end of US 11/US 64/SR 2 concurrency
Chattanooga	3.1	5.0	US 11 south / US 64 west (East 23rd Street/SR 2)	Eastern end of US 11/US 64/SR 2 concurrency
Chattanooga	3.2	5.1	I-24 west – Nashville, Birmingham	Westbound exit and eastbound entrance
East Ridge–Chattanooga line	3.6– 3.8	5.8– 6.1	Bachman Tubes under Missionary Ridge	
East Ridge	7.9	12.7	I-75 – Chattanooga, Atlanta	Exit 1 on I-75
East Ridge	8.9	14.3	US 41 south / US 76 east / SR 3 south – Dalton	Continuation into Georgia; eastern end of SR 8 concurrency
1.000 mi = 1.609 km; 1.000 km = 0.621 mi: Concurrency terminus; Incomplete access

== See also ==
U.S. Route 76
Previous state: Terminus	Tennessee	Next state: Georgia
