= Elora, Tennessee =

- Unincorporated community
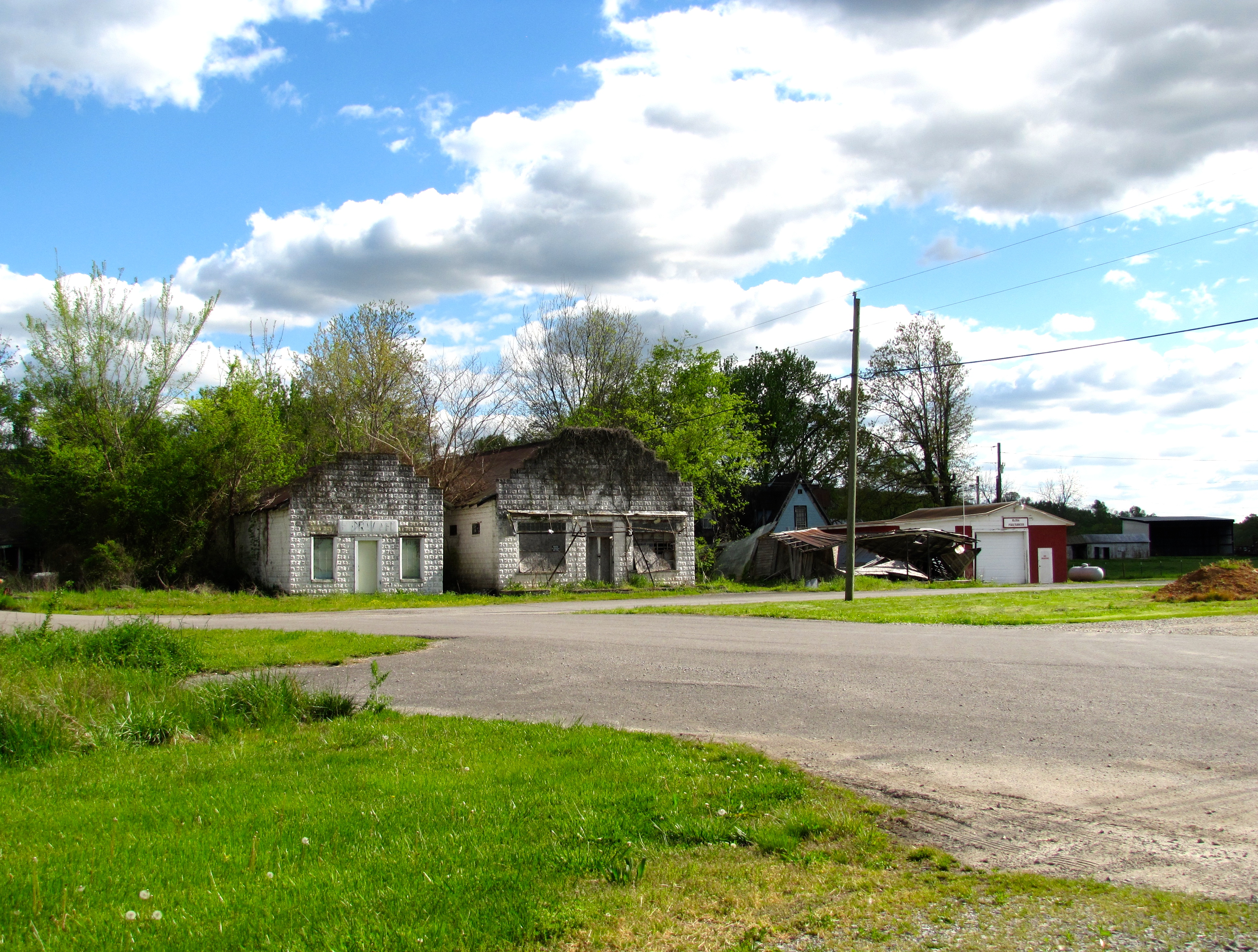
- Buildings along Green Road (2016)

- Location within Tennessee Location within the United States
- Coordinates: 35°0′48.31″N 86°21′20.96″W
- Country: United States
- State: Tennessee
- County: Lincoln
- Elevation: 929 ft (283 m)
- Time zone: UTC-6 (CST)
  - Summer (DST): UTC-5 (CDT)
- ZIP Code: 37328
- Area code: 931
- FIPS code: 47-23800
- GNIS ID: 1283729

Elora is an unincorporated community in Lincoln County, Tennessee, United States. It lies approximately 16 miles (26 km) southeast of Fayetteville and 2 miles (3.2 km) north of the Alabama state line.

== History ==
Elora was originally known as Baxter Station, and was established as a stop along the Fayetteville and Decherd Branch Railroad in the 1850s.

Elora has a post office with zip code 37328.

== Geography ==
Elora is concentrated around the intersection of Tennessee State Route 121 and Tennessee State Route 122 (John Hunter Highway). SR 121 connects Elora to U.S. Route 64 and the Tims Ford Lake area to the north and Madison County, Alabama, to the southwest, while SR 122 connects Elora with Huntland to the east.

== Notable people ==
- George Hawkins, member of both houses of the Alabama State Legislature, 1951-1959 (House) and 1963-1967 (Senate), born in Elora in 1918; practicing attorney in Gadsden
- Bill Hefner, member of the United States House of Representatives from North Carolina, was born in Elora.
