= Powells Crossroads, Tennessee =

- Town
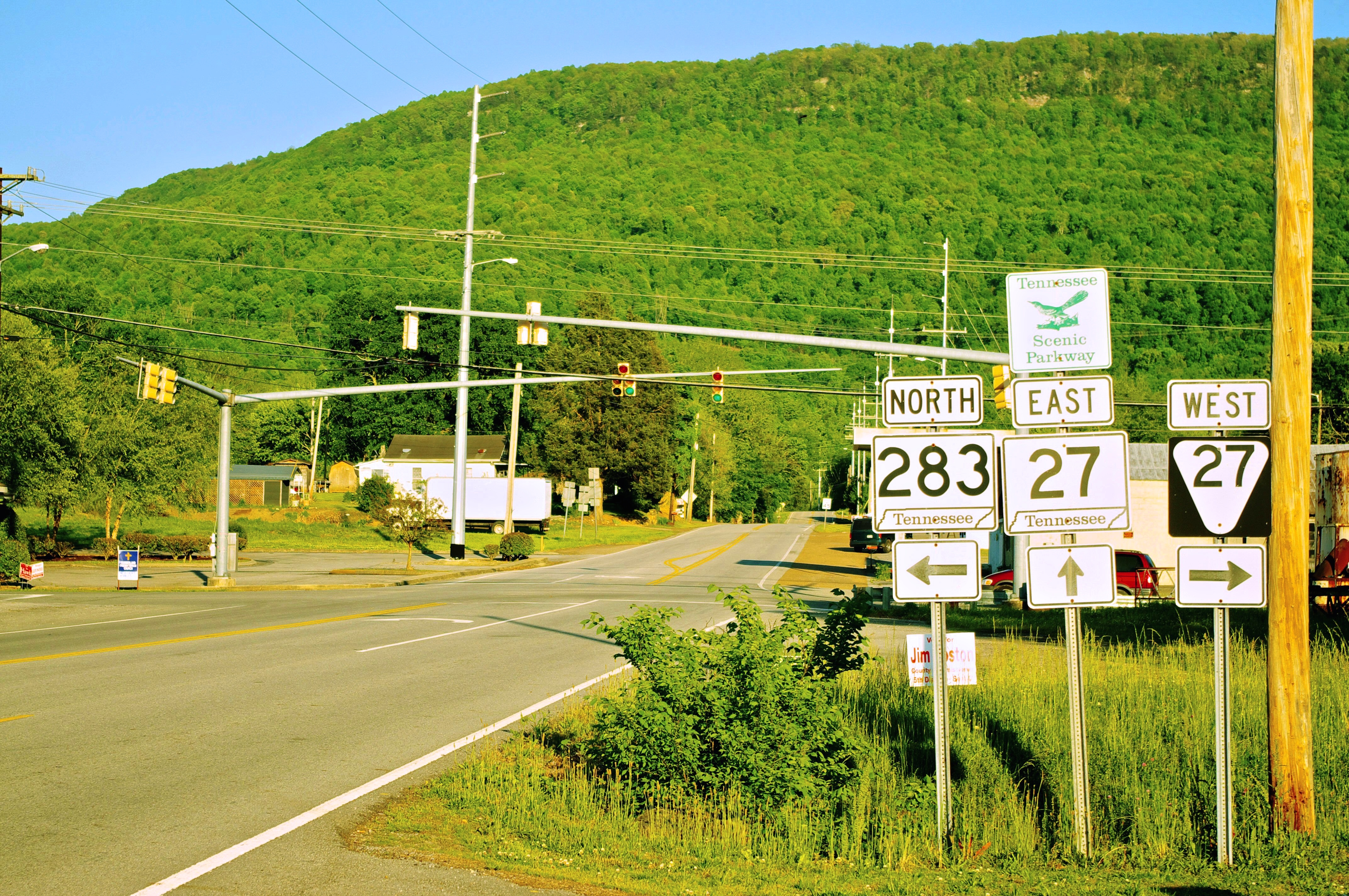
- Intersection of State Route 283 and State Route 27 in Powells Crossroads

- Location of Powells Crossroads in Marion County, Tennessee.
- Coordinates: 35°11′1″N 85°28′58″W
- Country: United States
- State: Tennessee
- County: Marion
- Incorporated: 1976

Area
  - Total: 4.90 sq mi (12.68 km^{2})
  - Land: 4.90 sq mi (12.68 km^{2})
  - Water: 0 sq mi (0.00 km^{2})
- Elevation: 676 ft (206 m)

Population (2020)
  - Total: 1,296
  - Density: 264.6/sq mi (102.18/km^{2})
- Time zone: UTC-6 (Central (CST))
  - Summer (DST): UTC-5 (CDT)
- ZIP code: 37397
- Area code: 423
- FIPS code: 47-60500
- GNIS feature ID: 1298433

Powells Crossroads is a town in Marion County, Tennessee, United States. As of the 2020 census, Powells Crossroads had a population of 1,296. It is part of the Chattanooga, TN-GA Metropolitan Statistical Area.

== Geography ==
Powells Crossroads is located at 35°11′1″N 85°28′58″W (35.183526, -85.482900). It is situated in the Sequatchie Valley around the intersection of State Route 283 and State Route 27. Whitwell lies just to the west, opposite the Sequatchie River. Walden Ridge, much of it protected by Prentice Cooper State Forest, rises prominently to the east.

According to the United States Census Bureau, the town has a total area of 4.4 square miles (11 km^{2}), all land.

== Demographics ==
Historical population
Census	Pop.	Note	%±
1980	918		—
1990	1,098		19.6%
2000	1,286		17.1%
2010	1,322		2.8%
2020	1,296		−2.0%

As of the census of 2000, there were 1,286 people, 485 households, and 392 families residing in the town. The population density was 294.0 inhabitants per square mile (113.5/km^{2}). There were 509 housing units at an average density of 116.4 per square mile (44.9/km^{2}). The racial makeup of the town was 99.22% White, 0.16% African American, 0.08% Native American, 0.08% Asian, 0.08% from other races, and 0.39% from two or more races. Hispanic or Latino of any race were 0.62% of the population.

There were 485 households, out of which 36.3% had children under the age of 18 living with them, 66.6% were married couples living together, 12.0% had a female householder with no husband present, and 19.0% were non-families. 17.5% of all households were made up of individuals, and 8.7% had someone living alone who was 65 years of age or older. The average household size was 2.65 and the average family size was 2.98.

In the town, the population was spread out, with 26.6% under the age of 18, 8.9% from 18 to 24, 30.6% from 25 to 44, 24.7% from 45 to 64, and 9.2% who were 65 years of age or older. The median age was 34 years. For every 100 females, there were 101.9 males. For every 100 females age 18 and over, there were 100.0 males.

The median income for a household in the town was $36,650, and the median income for a family was $42,727. Males had a median income of $33,611 versus $22,500 for females. The per capita income for the town was $17,536. About 5.8% of families and 7.1% of the population were below the poverty line, including 10.2% of those under age 18 and 11.4% of those age 65 and over.

== In popular culture ==
Powells Crossroads was the filming location for parts of the 1984 movie Starman. The lake on which Karen Allen's character lived is located in the Prentice Cooper State Forest and is called Crater Lake. The truck stop scene at "Bowdarks" was also filmed nearby, at the Martin Springs exit on I-24.
