= Whitwell, Tennessee =

- City
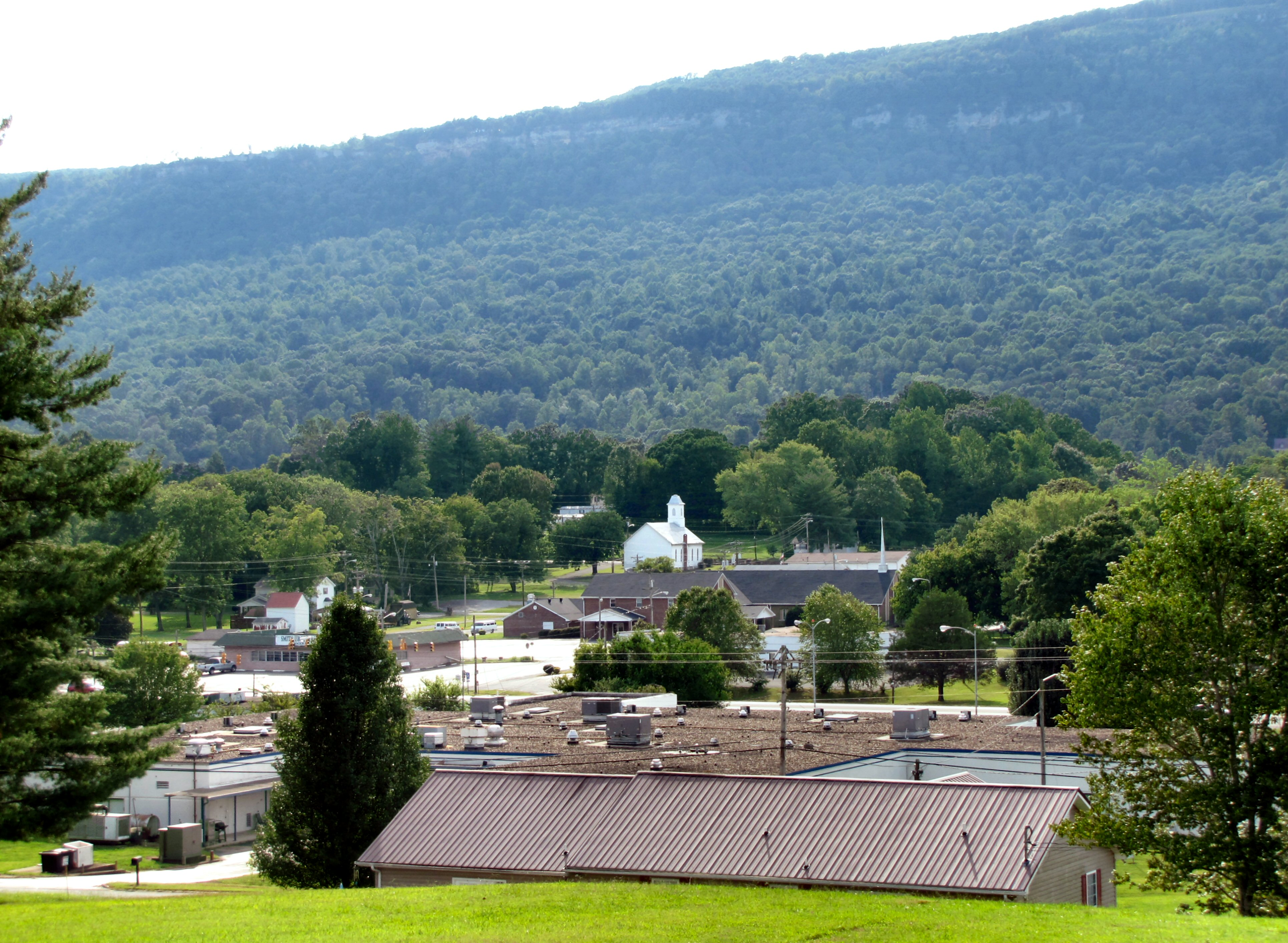
- View of Whitwell with the Cumberland Plateau in the background
- Nickname: Home of the Children's Holocaust Memorial
- Location of Whitwell in Marion County, Tennessee.
- Coordinates: 35°11′51″N 85°31′9″W
- Country: United States
- State: Tennessee
- County: Marion
- Incorporated: 1956
- Named for: Thomas Whitwell, inventor and mining entrepreneur

Area
  - Total: 3.51 sq mi (9.09 km^{2})
  - Land: 3.51 sq mi (9.09 km^{2})
  - Water: 0.0039 sq mi (0.01 km^{2})
- Elevation: 679 ft (207 m)

Population (2020)
  - Total: 1,641
  - Density: 467.7/sq mi (180.57/km^{2})
- Time zone: UTC-6 (Central (CST))
  - Summer (DST): UTC-5 (CDT)
- ZIP code: 37397
- Area code: 423
- FIPS code: 47-80620
- GNIS feature ID: 1304575
- Website: cityofwhitwell.com

Whitwell is a city in Marion County, Tennessee, United States, approximately 24 miles northwest of Chattanooga. The population was 1,641 at the 2020 census. It is part of the Chattanooga, TN–GA Metropolitan Statistical Area.

== History ==
The town that became Whitwell was originally known as Cheekville, but renamed "Whitwell" for Thomas Whitwell, a British metallurgist, inventor and co-founder of the Southern States Coal, Iron and Land Company, who was killed in an accident in his own ironworks in Thornaby in 1878. Whitwell was incorporated as a city in 1956, having grown as a mining town due to the abundance of coal in the mountains near the town. In 1981, there was a major mining accident when 13 coal miners were killed in an explosion. A full list of the names of those killed in the mine explosion is on a monument at Whitwell High School. Whitwell also has an annual Labor Day celebration that has been celebrated for over 50 consecutive years.

== Geography ==
Whitwell is located at 35°11′51″N 85°31′9″W (35.197570, −85.519082). It is situated in the southwestern Sequatchie Valley at the base of a relatively steep escarpment of the Cumberland Plateau. The Sequatchie River passes just east of the city, and forms a portion of its southeastern boundary.

Tennessee State Route 28 (Hudson Street), which forms part of the main north–south corridor in the valley, connects Whitwell with Dunlap to the north and Jasper to the south. State Route 283 connects Whitwell with Powells Crossroads across the Sequatchie river to the east, and State Route 108 (South Main Street) connects Whitwell with Grundy County atop the Plateau to the northwest.

According to the United States Census Bureau, the city has a total area of 3.3 square miles (8.5 km^{2}), of which 3.3 square miles (8.5 km^{2}) is land and 0.30% is water.

== Demographics ==
Historical population
Census	Pop.	Note	%±
1890	906		—
1960	1,857		—
1970	1,669		−10.1%
1980	1,783		6.8%
1990	1,622		−9.0%
2000	1,660		2.3%
2010	1,699		2.3%
2020	1,641		−3.4%

=== 2020 census ===
As of the 2020 census, Whitwell had a population of 1,641, a median age of 41.7 years, 20.3% of residents were under the age of 18, 20.2% of residents were 65 years of age or older, there were 90.4 males for every 100 females, and there were 91.2 males for every 100 females age 18 and over.

There were 709 households in Whitwell, of which 27.9% had children under the age of 18 living in them. Of all households, 38.9% were married-couple households, 20.6% were households with a male householder and no spouse or partner present, and 33.3% were households with a female householder and no spouse or partner present. About 33.0% of all households were made up of individuals and 15.8% had someone living alone who was 65 years of age or older.

There were 844 housing units, of which 16.0% were vacant. The homeowner vacancy rate was 2.6% and the rental vacancy rate was 10.0%.

0.0% of residents lived in urban areas, while 100.0% lived in rural areas.

Racial composition as of the 2020 census
Race	Number	Percent
White	1,513	92.2%
Black or African American	20	1.2%
American Indian and Alaska Native	3	0.2%
Asian	6	0.4%
Native Hawaiian and Other Pacific Islander	0	0.0%
Some other race	20	1.2%
Two or more races	79	4.8%
Hispanic or Latino (of any race)	58	3.5%

=== 2010 census ===
As of the census of 2010, there was a population of 1,669, with 714 households and 469 families residing in the city. The population density was 514.8 inhabitants per square mile (198.8/km^{2}). There were 825 housing units. The racial makeup of the city was 97.5% White, 0.9% African American, 0.2% Asian, 1.2% from other races, and 0.9% from two or more races. Hispanic or Latino of any race were 2.1% of the population.

=== 2000 census ===
As of the 2000 census, there were 727 households, out of which 24.8% had children under the age of 18 living with them, 49.5% were married couples living together, 13.3% had a female householder with no husband present, and 33.6% were non-families. 30.8% of all households were made up of individuals, and 15.8% had someone living alone who was 65 years of age or older. The average household size was 2.28 and the average family size was 2.85.

In the city, the population was spread out, with 20.0% under the age of 18, 9.9% from 18 to 24, 26.3% from 25 to 44, 26.4% from 45 to 64, and 17.5% who were 65 years of age or older. The median age was 41 years. For every 100 females, there were 84.2 males. For every 100 females age 18 and over, there were 78.5 males.

The median income for a household in the city was $25,458, and the median income for a family was $31,151. Males had a median income of $26,550 versus $21,532 for females. The per capita income for the city was $13,249. About 13.2% of families and 16.3% of the population were below the poverty line, including 19.4% of those under age 18 and 20.3% of those age 65 or over.

== Education ==
Whitwell has three schools: Whitwell Elementary School, Whitwell Middle School, and Whitwell High School.

In 2018, Whitwell High School's Football team, the Whitwell Tigers, finished the season 15–0, defeated Cornersville in the 1-A State Championship 7–6.

== Paper Clips Project ==
Whitwell has become renowned for the Paper Clips Project, a Holocaust memorial and educational project, that was carried out by children of the local middle school starting in 1998. A subsequent documentary was made about the children's achievement. This project started because students at the local middle school wanted to visually grasp how much six million was. The students started collecting paper clips, one for every Jew who was murdered in the Holocaust during World War II. This project soon attracted media attention and international support. Many Jewish notables sent paper clips representing lost members of their families. The children collected well over the number of paper clips they wanted (11 million, representing all noncombatant prisoners—Jew and Gentile—killed by the Nazis). The total collected number of paper clips now stands between ten and fifty million. This number is approximately equal to the total number of war deaths between 1939 and 1945. The rail car that appears in the movie is original rolling stock, actually used to transport Jews to the concentration camps. This rail car is located at the Whitwell Middle School. The Middle School routinely hosts Holocaust survivors as well as other guest speakers on the subject of the Holocaust.

== Notable persons ==
- Jon Coffelt (b. 1963), artist
- Hillis Layne (1918–2010), former Major League Baseball player
- Bennie Tate (1901–1973), former Major League Baseball player
- Ruth Marie Terry (1936–1974), murder victim whose body was found in Provincetown, Massachusetts
