= WEPG =

- South Pittsburg, Tennessee; United States
- Frequency: 910 kHz
- Branding: 104.9 The River

Programming
- Format: Country
- Affiliations: ABC News Radio

Ownership
- Owner: Tennessee Valley Broadcasting; (Spencer Travis Hickman)
- Sister stations: WSDQ

History
- First air date: 1954
- Call sign meaning: Eaton P. Govan (founder and original owner's initials)

Technical information
- Licensing authority: FCC
- Facility ID: 40154
- Class: D
- Power: 5,000 watts (day); 95 watts (night)
- ERP: 180 watts
- Transmitter coordinates: 35°0′57.00″N 85°42′0.00″W
- Translator: 104.9 W285FW (South Pittsburg)

Links
- Public license information: Public file; LMS
- Website: www.theriver1049.com

WEPG (104.9 FM and 910 AM, "104.9 The River") is a radio station broadcasting a country music format. Licensed to South Pittsburg, Tennessee, United States. The station is owned by Spencer Travis Hickman and features local programming and syndicated programming from ABC News Radio, Westwood One, and others. The station simulcasts on an FM translator at 104.9 mHz, which is also licensed to South Pittsburg, and located atop Sand Mountain in nearby Bryant, Alabama which offers a strong signal in the Sequatchie Valley from Scottsboro, Alabama in the South to Dunlap, Tennessee at the North end of the FM station's coverage.

== History ==
WEPG went on the air in 1954 from studios and transmitting facilities located at Railroad and 3rd Streets in South Pittsburg, Tennessee, not far from the location of the present-day studios and transmitter. Application for the construction permit with the FCC was filed in June 1953 by station engineer, Frank H. McIntosh, calling for a 500 watt facility to serve the valley. Owner and founder, Eaton P. Govan, Jr., launched the station under the business name of Marion County Broadcasting Service, Inc., to fill a void for a local to Marion County, Tennessee radio station. WEPG moved from its Railroad Street location in or around 1969 to its current location on Ash Avenue along the Tennessee River just in the shadow of local landmark, the Shelby Rhinehart Bridge 'aka' the "Big Blue Bridge" that spans the river connecting South Pittsburg to neighboring New Hope, Tennessee. WEPG utilizes the broadcast tower, which was erected sometime around 1968 or 1969, and which has a height of 255 feet (78 m). The tower and studios border the Tennessee River.

WEPG ownership changed several times throughout the years, with one of the owners eventually acquiring WSDQ in nearby Dunlap, Tennessee in 2002, which remains a sister-station of WEPG to this day.

Travis Hickman, present-day Owner and General Manager, has been with WEPG since 1982 and is the longest-tenured personality with the station. Other notable personalities from WEPG's past include David Carroll, Logan Carmichael, Rusty Brown, Mikey McCullough, Tommy Jett, Robert Frye, Dave Daffron, Chris Goforth, Lucky Knott, Will Rodgers, Debbie Johnson, Sam Shoemake, Rob Hunter (Rex Holiday), Bob Collins, Mike Middleton, Mike Gibson, and a host of others throughout the years—always giving them the boost to a successful and long career in radio and broadcasting.

As part of the format WEPG also filters in some Bluegrass from time to time. WEPG is a big supporter of "The Mother Church of Country Music." The world-famous Grand Ole Opry.

WEPG's popular morning "Swap & Shop" show has been a mainstay on the station since shortly after the station signed on the air.

WEPG also offers its programming over local broadband/TV provider SVEConnect Channel 4, along with streaming in the iTV Chattanooga smart TV app, Charter (Spectrum) cable channel 197, in addition to their 104.9 FM translator and the original 910 AM signal.
