= Tennessee State Route 134 =

State highway in Tennessee, United States

State Route 134
- SR 134 highlighted in red

Route information
- Maintained by TDOT
- Length: 6.55 mi (10.54 km)

Major junctions
- West end: US 41 / US 64 / US 72 in Haletown
- SR 156 northeast of Ladds
- East end: SR 299 at the Georgia state line west of Hooker

Location
- Country: United States
- State: Tennessee
- Counties: Marion, Hamilton

Highway system
- Tennessee State Routes; Interstate; US; State
← SR 133	→ SR 135

State Route 134 (SR 134) is an east–west state highway in southeastern Tennessee. The 6.55-mile-long (10.54 km) state route traverses portions of southern Marion and southwestern Hamilton Counties. It travels along a path from Haletown to the Georgia state line.

== Route description ==
SR 134 begins at an intersection with US 41 (SR 2) during that highway's concurrency with US 64 and US 72. From Haletown, the highway travels east-southeastward to have an intersection with SR 156 before passing through the small community of Whiteside, and entering extreme southwestern Hamilton County before crossing the Georgia state line, where the roadway continues as Georgia State Route 299 (SR 299) within only minutes from that highway's intersection with Interstate 24 (I-24) in Dade County, Georgia.

== Major intersections ==
County	Location	mi	km	Destinations	Notes
Marion	Haletown	0.0	0.0	US 41 / US 64 / US 72 (Lee Highway/SR 2) – Jasper, Chattanooga	Western terminus
Marion	Haletown			SR 156 west (Shellmound Road) – New Hope, South Pittsburg	Eastern terminus of SR 156
Hamilton		6.55	10.54	SR 299 south – Wildwood	Continuation into Georgia
1.000 mi = 1.609 km; 1.000 km = 0.621 mi
