= Tennessee State Route 377 =

Highway in Tennessee

State Route 377
- TN 377 highlighted in red

Route information
- Maintained by TDOT
- Length: 1.2 mi (1.9 km)
- Existed: July 1, 1983–present

Major junctions
- South end: SR 73 at the Alabama state line near New Hope
- North end: SR 156 in New Hope

Location
- Country: United States
- State: Tennessee
- Counties: Marion

Highway system
- Tennessee State Routes; Interstate; US; State
← SR 376	→ SR 378

State Route 377 (SR 377) is a short 1.2-mile-long (1.9 km) north-south in Marion County, Tennessee. It serves as a northern continuation of Alabama State Route 73 (SR 73) beyond the state line, connecting it with the town of New Hope.

== Route description ==
SR 377 begins at the Alabama state line, where it continues south toward Bryant as Alabama State Route 73 (SR 73). It winds its way south through wooded areas as it descends Sand Mountain as a two-lane highway. It then enters New Hope and comes to an end at an intersection with SR 156 along the banks of Nickajack Lake/Tennessee River, at the eastern edge of town.

== Major intersections ==
The entire route is in Marion County.

Location	mi	km	Destinations	Notes
	0.0	0.0	SR 73 south – Bryant	Alabama state line; southern terminus
New Hope	1.2	1.9	SR 156 (Shellmound Road) – South Pittsburg, Haletown	Northern terminus
1.000 mi = 1.609 km; 1.000 km = 0.621 mi
