= Pittsburg High School =

Pittsburg High School may refer to:

- Pittsburg High School (California), Pittsburg, California
- Pittsburg High School (Kansas), Pittsburg, Kansas
- Pittsburg High School (New Hampshire), Pittsburg, New Hampshire
- Pittsburg High School (Oklahoma), Pittsburg, Oklahoma
- Pittsburg High School (Texas), Pittsburg, Texas
- South Pittsburg High School, South Pittsburg, Tennessee
