= Alabama State Route 73 =

Highway in Alabama

State Route 73

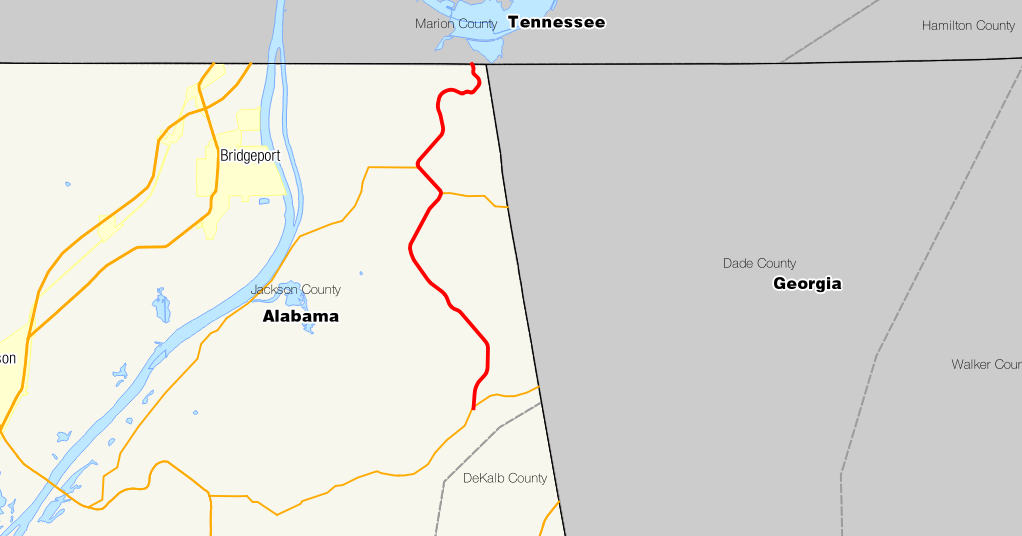

Route information
- Maintained by ALDOT
- Length: 11.219 mi (18.055 km)

Major junctions
- South end: SR 71 at Higdon
- North end: SR 377 at the Tennessee state line near New Hope, TN

Location
- Country: United States
- State: Alabama
- Counties: Jackson

Highway system
- Alabama State Highway System; Interstate; US; State
← US 72	→ SR 74

State Route 73 (SR 73), is a 11.219-mile-long (18.055 km) state highway in the U.S. state of Alabama. The southern terminus of the highway is at an intersection with SR 71 in Higdon north to the Tennessee state line, where it becomes Tennessee State Route 377 (SR 377). SR 73 travels through rural areas in eastern Jackson County, serving the community of Bryant.

== Route description ==
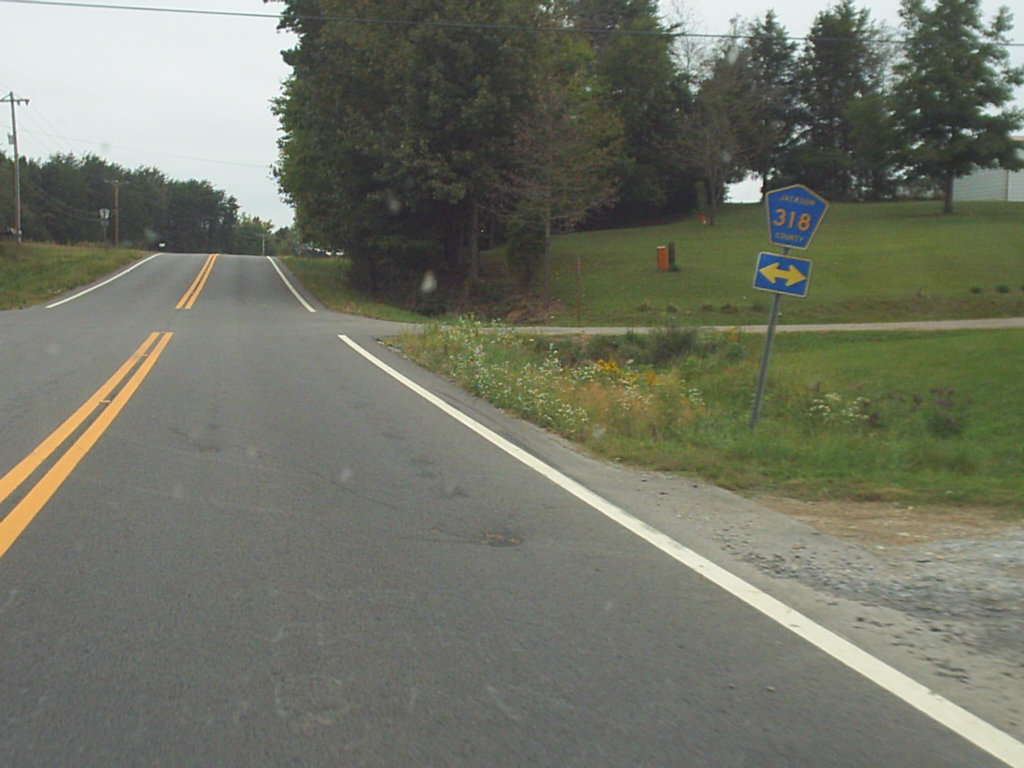
SR 73 northbound at CR 318

SR 73 begins at an intersection with SR 71 in the community of Higdon, heading north on a two-lane undivided road. The highway heads through rural areas of farms and woods with some homes, curving to the northwest. The highway heads north again as it crosses under several power lines radiating from the Widows Creek Power Plant along the Tennessee River. SR 73 continues northeast past homes and businesses in the Bryant area on top of Sand Mountain prior to going north through more forested areas with a few rural homes. The highway travels through a mix of farm and woodland before it turns east into forests. SR 73 makes a sharp curve north again to traverse Sand Mountain as it comes to the Tennessee state line. At this point, the road continues into Tennessee as SR 377, which ascends Sand Mountain to end at SR 156 in New Hope, TN, a town just east of South Pittsburg, TN.

== History ==
The SR 73 designation was first assigned in 1934 to an unimproved road connecting SR 74 in Piedmont and SR 62 in Forney, traveling through Spring Garden and Rock Run. By 1948, this road was removed from the state highway system, becoming CR 29 in Calhoun and Cherokee counties by 1955. What would become the current SR 73 south of Bryant became a part of SR 207 by 1955; at this time, the portion of road was a paved highway. SR 207 was redesignated SR 73 by 1957. By 1987, SR 73 was extended north from Bryant to the Tennessee state line.

== Major intersections ==
The entire route is in Jackson County.

Location	mi	km	Destinations	Notes
Higdon	0.000	0.000	SR 71 – Pisgah, Trenton, GA	Southern terminus
Bryant	11.219	18.055	SR 377 north – New Hope	Tennessee state line
1.000 mi = 1.609 km; 1.000 km = 0.621 mi
