= Tennessee State Route 156 =

State highway in Franklin and Marion counties in Tennessee, United States

State Route 156
- SR 156 highlighted in red

Route information
- Maintained by TDOT
- Length: 35.4 mi (57.0 km)

Major junctions
- West end: US 41A / SR 56 in Saint Andrews
- US 72 in South Pittsburgh; I-24 exit 161 near Haletown
- East end: SR 134 in Haletown

Location
- Country: United States
- State: Tennessee
- Counties: Franklin, Marion

Highway system
- Tennessee State Routes; Interstate; US; State
← SR 155	→ SR 157

State Route 156 (SR 156) is a spur route of Tennessee State Route 56 (SR 56) and a state highway in Franklin and Marion counties in the southern central and southeastern portions of Tennessee, United States. It traverses the southern Cumberland Plateau before descending into the Sequatchie Valley, where follows the shores of Nickajack Lake for its final few miles.

== Route description ==
SR 156 begins in Franklin County atop the western part of the Cumberland Plateau near Sewanee at an intersection with U.S. Route 41A/SR 15/SR 56. It winds its way southeastward across a remote section of the plateau, passing through Franklin State Forest along the way and crossing into Marion County after straddling the county line for a few miles. After exiting the forest, the road veers eastward and intersects Orme Mountain Road, a gravel road connecting the highway with Orme in the valley to the south.

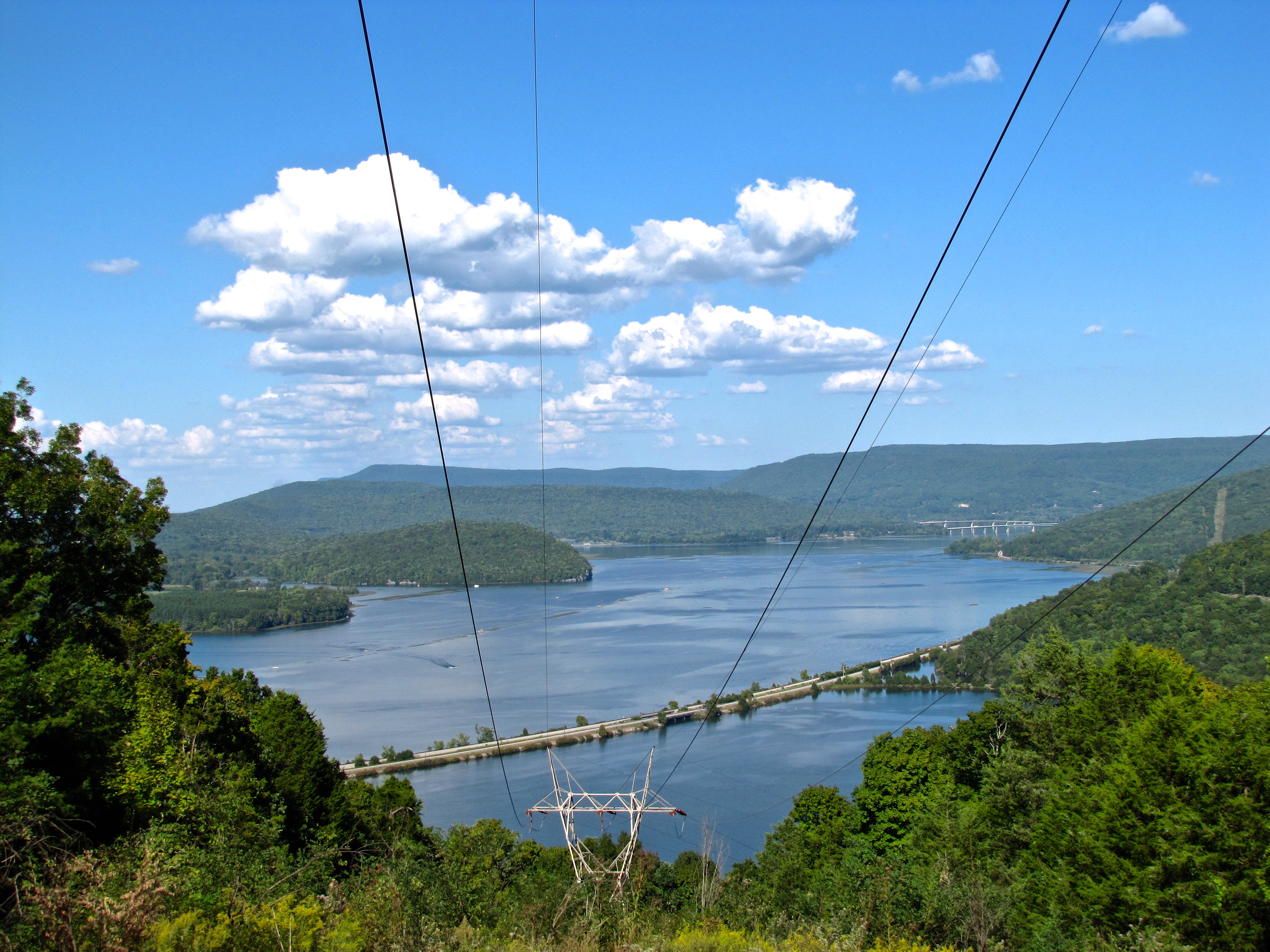
View of Nickajack Lake from Tennessee State Route 377, showing the causeway carrying SR 156 across the lake below, September 2016

Just beyond its intersection with Patton School Road, SR 156 descends more than one thousand feet (300 m) from the edge of the plateau into the Sequatchie Valley, where it enters South Pittsburg. It follows 2nd Street through the city's downtown area before briefly merging with the former route of U.S. Route 72/SR 27, veering north along Cedar Avenue for several blocks, and then turning eastward again to have an interchange with the current expressway alignment. SR 156 crosses the Tennessee River via the steel arch Shelby Rhinehart Bridge.

After crossing the bridge, SR 156 enters New Hope, which it traverses from west-to-east, providing its main traffic artery. Shortly after crossing the bridge, it intersects SR 422, which goes south to Long Island, Alabama. At this city's eastern limits, SR 156 intersects SR 377, which continues southward into Alabama (where it becomes Alabama State Route 73). Beyond this intersection, SR 156 crosses a one-mile-long (1.6 km) causeway across Nickajack Lake, with the Nickajack Cove inlet to the south, and the main body of the lake to the north. The road runs parallel to a stretch of CSX railroad tracks along the length of the causeway.

After reaching the main lakeshore, SR 156 turns northeastward, following the shore and the lower slopes of Sand Mountain before reaching an intersection with Interstate 24 (Exit 161). Just past this intersection, the highway again crosses a section of the lake before terminating at its intersection with SR 134. From this point, SR 134 continues northward into Haletown and eastward toward Whiteside and the northwestern part of the state of Georgia.

== Major intersections ==
County	Location	mi	km	Destinations	Notes
Franklin	Saint Andrews	0.0	0.0	US 41A / SR 56 (Sewanee Highway/Sollace M. Freeman Highway/SR 15) – Monteagle, Sewanee, The University of the South, Cowan, Winchester	Western terminus
Marion	No major junctions				
Franklin	No major junctions				
Marion				Orme Mountain Road – Orme	End South-North designation
Marion	South Pittsburg			US 72 east (SR 27 east) to I-24 – Kimball, Jasper	Interchange
Marion	South Pittsburg			US 72 west (SR 27 west) – Bridgeport, Stevenson, Hollywood, Scottsboro	Interchange
Marion	Tennessee River			Shelby Reinhart Bridge across Guntersville Lake	
Marion	New Hope			SR 422 south (Long Island Road)	Northern terminus of SR 422
Marion	New Hope			SR 377 south to SR 73 – Bryant	Northern terminus of SR 377
Marion	Haletown			I-24 – Chattanooga, Nashville	I&8209;24 Exit 161
Marion	Haletown	35.4	57.0	SR 134 (J.E. Clouse Highway) – downtown, Jasper, Whiteside, Wildwood (Georgia)	Eastern terminus
1.000 mi = 1.609 km; 1.000 km = 0.621 mi: Incomplete access

== See also ==
- List of state routes in Tennessee
- List of highways numbered 156
