= Tennessee State Route 422 =

Highway in Tennessee

State Route 422
- Long Island Road
- TN 422 highlighted in red

Route information
- Maintained by TDOT
- Length: 2.38 mi (3.83 km)

Major junctions
- South end: CR 93 at the Alabama state line near New Hope
- North end: SR 156 in New Hope

Location
- Country: United States
- State: Tennessee
- Counties: Marion

Highway system
- Tennessee State Routes; Interstate; US; State
← SR 421	→ SR 423

State Route 422 (SR 422), also known as Long Island Road, is a short 2.38-mile-long (3.83 km) north-south state highway located entirely in the city of New Hope, Tennessee. It connects various neighborhoods of the city with its main business district and the Alabama state line. SR 422 is a winding two-lane road for its entire length.

== Major intersections ==
The entire route is in New Hope, Marion County.

mi	km	Destinations	Notes
0.00	0.00	CR 93 south (Long Island Road) – Long Island	Southern terminus
2.38	3.83	SR 156 (Shellmound Road) to I-24 – South Pittsburg, Haletown	Northern terminus
1.000 mi = 1.609 km; 1.000 km = 0.621 mi
