= Georgia State Route 299 =

Highway in Georgia, United States

State Route 299
- Hooker Road
- SR 299 highlighted in red

Route information
- Maintained by GDOT
- Length: 3.5 mi (5.6 km)

Major junctions
- North end: SR 134 at the Tennessee state line west-northwest of Hooker
- I-24 east of Hooker
- South end: US 11 / SR 58 northeast of Wildwood

Location
- Country: United States
- State: Georgia
- County: Dade

Highway system
- Georgia State Highway System; Interstate; US; State; Special
← SR 298	→ SR 300

State Route 299 (SR 299) is a short southeast–northwest state highway located in the northwestern part of the U.S. state of Georgia. Its route is entirely within Dade County.

== Route description ==
Unlike most west-to-east routes in the United States, SR 299's mile markers increase while traveling westbound rather than eastbound. While the route sees an Annual Average Daily Traffic (AADT) of between 2,000 and 5,000 vehicles, the route's use as a through route has largely been supplanted by I-24, which passes through the same corridor as SR 299, and its continuation into Tennessee as State Route 134.

SR 299 begins at the Tennessee state line, where the roadway continues as Tennessee State Route 134. After its first 1.6 miles (2.6 km) from the Tennessee state line, the road passes through the unincorporated community of Hooker where it meets CR 143. It then heads towards an interchange with I-24/SR 409 (Exit 169) between Hooker and Wildwood. After meeting I-24/SR 409, it then meets its southern (in compass is eastern) terminus at US 11/SR 58 northeast of Wildwood.

== Major intersections ==
Milemakers goes through an inverse pattern. The entire route is in Dade County.

Location	mi	km	Destinations	Notes
	0.0	0.0	SR 134 west – Whiteside, Jasper	Continuation into Tennessee
	2.7	4.3	I-24 (SR 409) – Nashville, Chattanooga	I-24 exit 169
	3.5	5.6	US 11 (SR 58) – Chattanooga, Trenton, Birmingham	Southern terminus
1.000 mi = 1.609 km; 1.000 km = 0.621 mi
