= McReynolds High School =

Segregated school in Tennessee, United States

Coordinates: 35.0171°N 85.7023°W

McReynolds High School was a school for African Americans in South Pittsburg, Tennessee built in 1921. The school building was destroyed by an arsonist. A historical marker commemorates its history.

It was built in 1921 and named for Brown McReynolds who helped establish the school. M. M. Burnett was its principal. Its gymnasium remained after the fire. The gym was used for storage before sitting vacant for several years. There was a fire at the school in 2017 and it burned down in a second fire in 2018.
