= James M. Lewis =

American politician (1943–2022)

Member of the Tennessee Senate from the 13th district
- In office 1986–1990

South Pittsburg Fire and Police Commissioner
- In office 1972–1979

Personal details
- Born: James Morgan Lewis Jr. September 19, 1943 Chattanooga, Tennessee, U.S.
- Died: June 1, 2022 (aged 78) South Pittsburg, Tennessee, U.S.
- Spouse: Stephanie Maughan Lewis
- Children: 5
- Parent(s): James Morgan Lewis Sr. Margaret Anderson Lewis
- Education: South Pittsburg High School; University of Tennessee; Samford University
- Profession: Politician, pharmacist

James Morgan Lewis Jr. (September 19, 1943 – June 1, 2022) was an American politician and pharmacist who served in the Tennessee Senate, representing the 13th legislative district of Tennessee from 1986 to 1990.

== Early life and education ==
Lewis was born in Chattanooga, Tennessee, on September 19, 1943, to James Morgan Lewis Sr. and Margaret Anderson Lewis. He grew up in South Pittsburg, Tennessee.

Lewis graduated from South Pittsburg High School, the University of Tennessee, and Samford University.

== Career ==
Lewis was South Pittsburg Fire and Police Commissioner from 1972 to 1979.

Lewis had two terms in the Tennessee Senate, representing the 13th legislative district of Tennessee from 1986 to 1990.

Outside of the Tennessee General Assembly, Lewis practiced pharmacy for more than 50 years, as chief executive officer of Lewis Pharmaceutical Information, Inc.

== Personal life and death ==
Lewis was married to Stephanie Maughan Lewis, with whom he had five sons, one of whom preceded him in death as an infant. He resided in South Pittsburg, Tennessee.

Lewis died at the age of 78 in South Pittsburg on June 1, 2022.

Tennessee House of Representatives
Preceded by —	Member of the Tennessee House of Representatives from the 13th district 1986–1990	Succeeded by —
