= AL 73 =

AL 73 may refer to:

- Alabama State Route 73
- Sharpe Field (FAA LID: AL73)
