= Aetna, Tennessee =

Aetna, Tennessee may refer to several places:

- Aetna, Hickman County, Tennessee
- Aetna, Marion County, Tennessee
