= Orme, Tennessee =

- Town
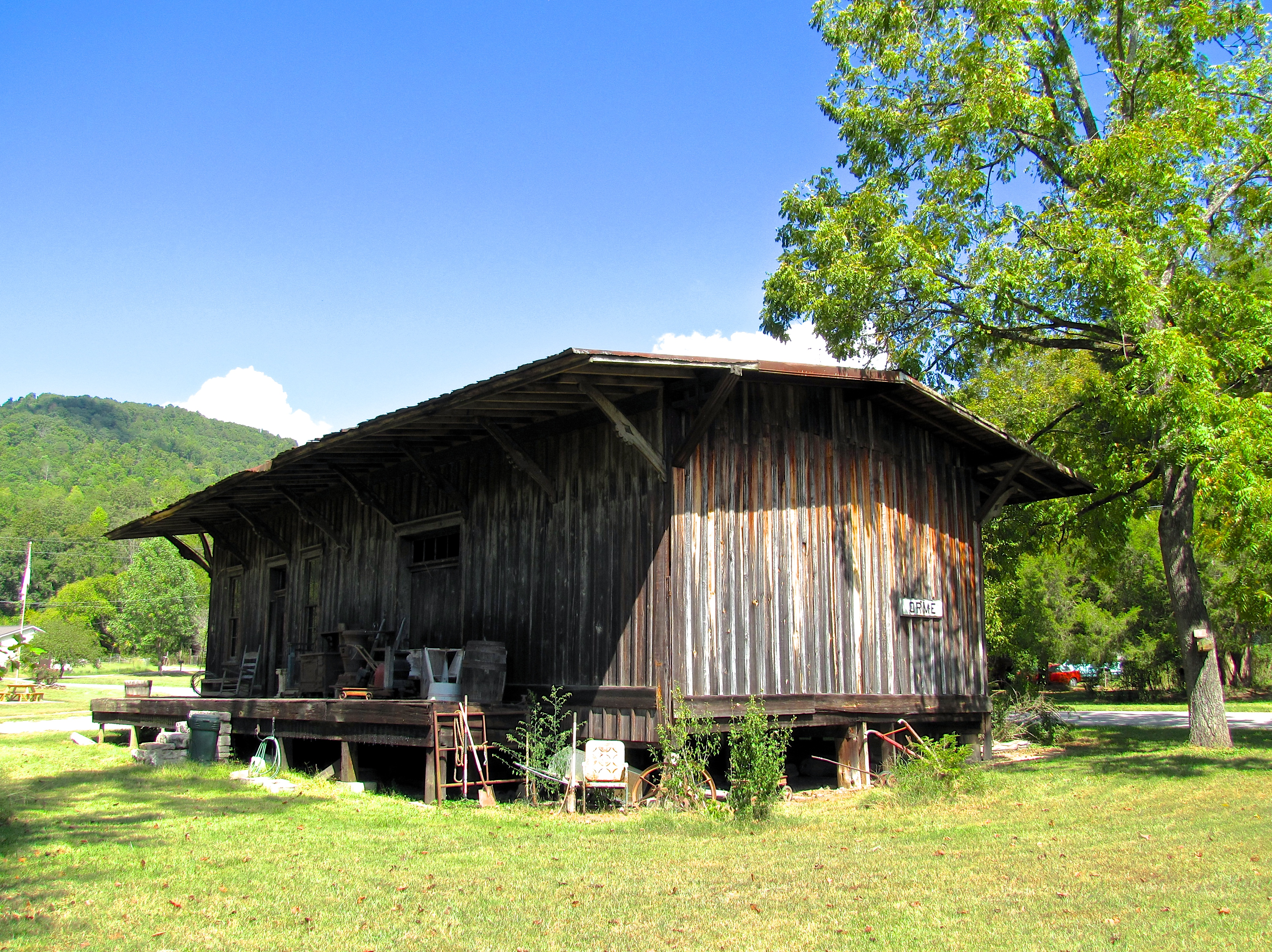
- Orme Depot

- Location of Orme in Marion County, Tennessee.
- Coordinates: 35°0′41″N 85°48′19″W
- Country: United States
- State: Tennessee
- County: Marion

Area
  - Total: 4.13 sq mi (10.70 km^{2})
  - Land: 4.13 sq mi (10.70 km^{2})
  - Water: 0 sq mi (0.00 km^{2})
- Elevation: 850 ft (260 m)

Population (2020)
  - Total: 87
  - Density: 21.1/sq mi (8.13/km^{2})
- Time zone: UTC-6 (Central (CST))
  - Summer (DST): UTC-5 (CDT)
- ZIP code: 37380
- Area code: 423
- FIPS code: 47-56040
- GNIS feature ID: 1296488

Orme is a town in Marion County, Tennessee, United States. The population was 87 as of the 2020 census, down from 126 as of the 2010 census. It is part of the Chattanooga, TN–GA Metropolitan Statistical Area.

== History ==
Orme is rooted in a coal mining community known as Needmore, which was established in the early 1890s. Mining operations in the valley were slow to develop, however, due to the area's remoteness and lack of adequate means of transportation for the coal. In the late 1890s, Chattanooga businessman Frederick Gates purchased the Needmore mining operations, and began negotiating with the Nashville, Chattanooga and St. Louis Railway to build a branch line into the valley. After some hesitation, this railroad agreed to build the line in 1902.

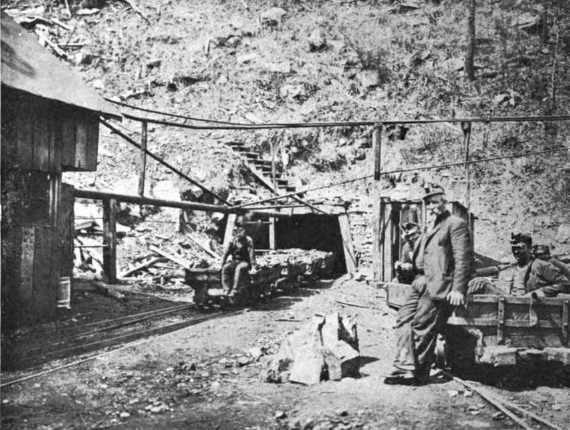
Entrance to a mine at Orme in the early 1910s

After negotiating the construction of the branch line, Gates sold the Needmore operation to Richard Orme Campbell (1860–1912), who renamed the operation the "Campbell Coal and Coke Company". He renamed the town of Needmore after his son, who was also named Richard Orme Campbell (the name "Orme" was the maiden name of the elder Campbell's mother, Virginia Orme). Along with mining facilities, Campbell built a commissary, an office building, workers' cottages, schools, and a hotel. Within a few years, the town had grown to several thousand residents.

Campbell sold the Orme operation in 1905, and the new owners renamed the company, "Battle Creek Coal and Coke Company." By 1912, the operation consisted of four drift mines, some reaching high up the walls of the Cumberland Plateau. Mule-drawn rail cars carried the mined coal to the mine entrances, where it was transferred to a locomotive. The locomotive then carried the coal to an upper tipple, which in turn transferred it to a lower tipple. At its height, the mining operation was shipping 1,000 tons of coal per day out of the valley. The operation was known for its "good coal, inaccessibility, irregular stratification, and consequently difficult mining."

Following a miners' strike in 1939, major mining operations in Orme were shut down. The railroad company removed the rails, and the metal was used for ongoing World War II efforts. Afterward, Orme declined. The hotel closed in 1945, the school closed in 1961, and the post office closed in 1970. The wooden railroad depot is one of the few buildings remaining from the town's mining heyday.

=== 2007 drought ===
In 2007, Orme was one of the hardest-hit communities in the drought-ridden southeastern United States, due to its dependence on two vulnerable water sources: a waterfall-fed creek and a natural spring that delivered up to 60,000 gallons/day (227,000 liters/day). These sources dried up to only 5,000 gallons/day (19,000 liters/day), not enough to pressurize the supply lines to the town's residents. A temporary solution was arranged whereby a truck would haul water to the town providing enough water to keep the system running for three hours each evening. The mayor of Orme, Tony Reames, arranged a permanent solution in the form of a connection to the municipal system of the nearby town of Bridgeport, Alabama. In his words: "It's not a short-term solution. It is THE solution." The connection would be via a 2.5-mile (4.0 km) pipe between the two towns, paid for by an emergency grant of $377,590 from the USDA. The project was hoped to be completed by the end of November 2007.

== Geography ==
Orme (rhymes with "storm") is located at 35°0′41″N 85°48′19″W (35.011361, -85.805175). The town occupies most of the Tennessee portion (i.e., the northern end) of Doran's Cove, a narrow valley surrounded on the north, east, and west by the Cumberland Plateau. Most of Orme's public buildings and residences are concentrated in a small stretch of bottomland along Dry Creek, the valley's primary drainage. The walls of the plateau rise nearly a thousand feet in all directions, the exception being a relatively narrow gap that opens to the south. South Pittsburg, Tennessee, lies across the plateau to the east, and Bridgeport, Alabama, lies to the southeast. Russell Cave National Monument lies just across the state line to the south.

A single paved road, Orme Road, connects Orme to Jackson County, Alabama. To reach Orme via paved road from Tennessee generally requires driving along U.S. Route 72 from South Pittsburg southward into Alabama, and following county roads 75 and 98 northward through Doran's Cove (the latter highway becomes Orme Road at the state line). A gravel road, Orme Mountain Road, connects Orme with Tennessee State Route 156 atop the plateau to the north.

According to the United States Census Bureau, the town has a total area of 4.2 square miles (11 km^{2}), all land.

== Demographics ==
Historical population
Census	Pop.	Note	%±
1910	653		—
1920	522		−20.1%
1930	466		−10.7%
1940	277		−40.6%
1950	230		−17.0%
1960	171		−25.7%
1970	122		−28.7%
1980	181		48.4%
1990	150		−17.1%
2000	124		−17.3%
2010	126		1.6%
2020	87		−31.0%

As of the census of 2000, there were 124 people, 57 households, and 36 families residing in the town. The population density was 29.8 inhabitants per square mile (11.5/km^{2}). There were 63 housing units at an average density of 15.2 per square mile (5.9/km^{2}). The racial makeup of the town was 100.00% White.

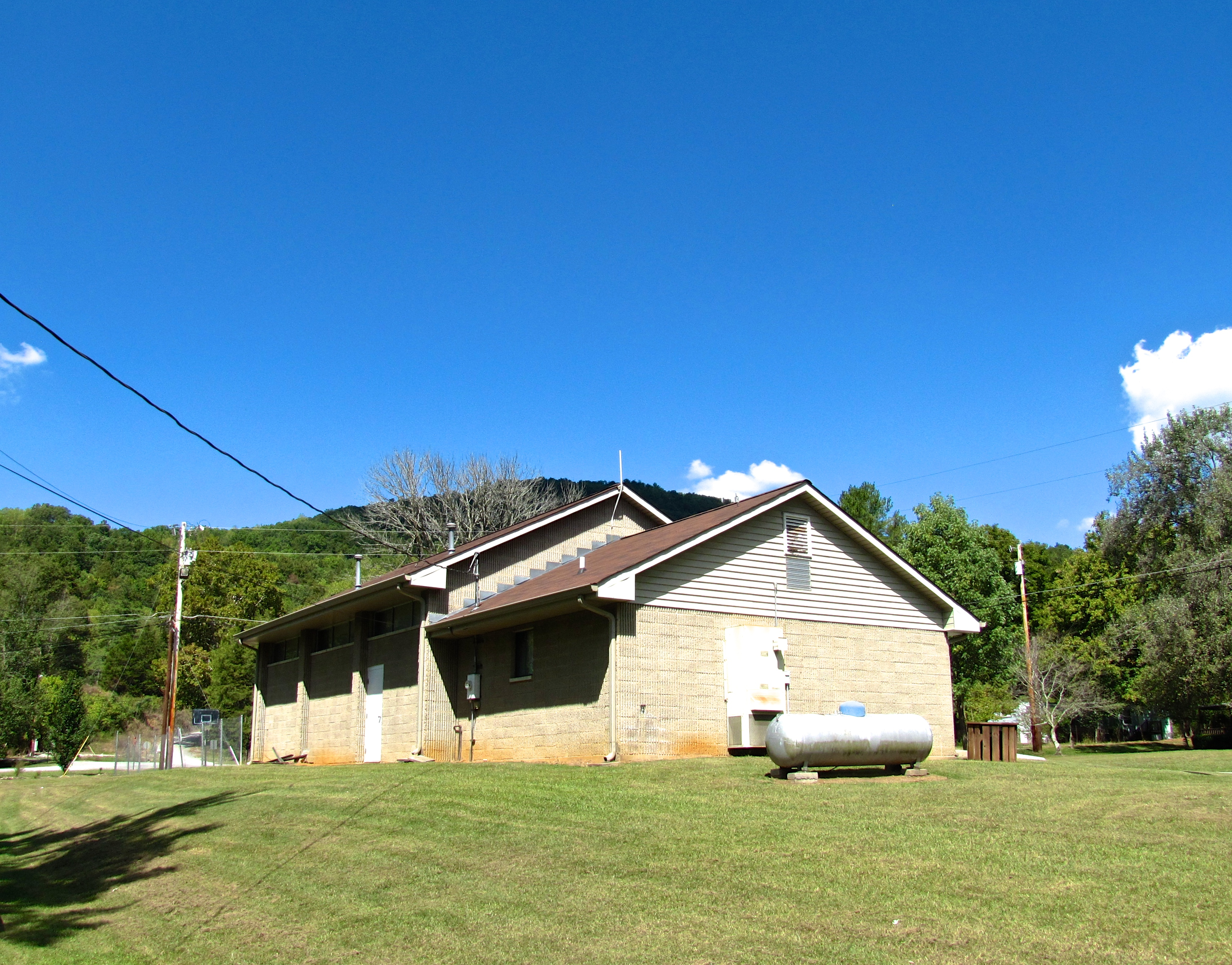
Orme town hall and fire department

There were 57 households, out of which 28.1% had children under the age of 18 living with them, 49.1% were married couples living together, 12.3% had a female householder with no husband present, and 36.8% were non-families. 29.8% of all households were made up of individuals, and 8.8% had someone living alone who was 65 years of age or older. The average household size was 2.18 and the average family size was 2.64.

In the town, the population was spread out, with 17.7% under the age of 18, 8.1% from 18 to 24, 25.8% from 25 to 44, 36.3% from 45 to 64, and 12.1% who were 65 years of age or older. The median age was 44 years. For every 100 females, there were 121.4 males. For every 100 females age 18 and over, there were 104.0 males.

The median income for a household in the town was $21,563, and the median income for a family was $23,750. Males had a median income of $45,833 versus $20,000 for females. The per capita income for the town was $14,374. There were 17.9% of families and 18.6% of the population living below the poverty line, including 22.2% of under eighteens and 18.2% of those over 64.

== Notable people ==
- Jimmy Outlaw (1913-2006), baseball player
