= Mineral Springs, Tennessee =

Mineral Springs, Tennessee may refer to the following places in Tennessee:

- Mineral Springs, Marion County, Tennessee
- Mineral Springs, Overton County, Tennessee
