= MVCA =

MVCA may refer to:

- Mountain View Christian Academy, a K-12 school in Alabama, United States
- Mountain View College Academy, a high school in Valencia City, Philippines
- Motor Vehicle Consultants Association, a club in Toronto, Canada
