= WSDQ =

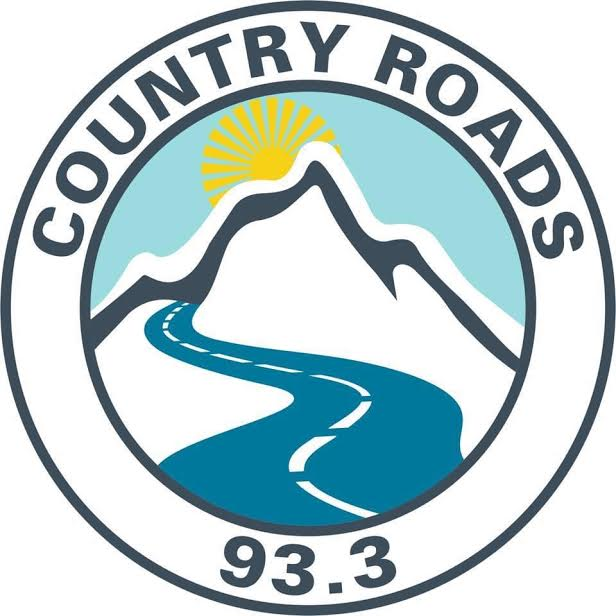
- Dunlap, Tennessee; United States
- Frequency: 1190 kHz
- Branding: The Valley's Home For Country

Programming
- Format: Country
- Affiliations: ABC News Radio

Ownership
- Owner: Tennessee Valley Broadcasting; (Spencer Travis Hickman)
- Sister stations: WEPG

History
- First air date: January 8, 1981 (as WSVC)
- Former call signs: WSVC (1981–1986)
- Call sign meaning: WSDQ = Sequatchie Dunlap / WSVC = Sequatchie Valley Country

Technical information
- Licensing authority: FCC
- Facility ID: 67280
- Class: D
- Power: 5,000 watts day 1,000 watts critical hours
- Transmitter coordinates: 35°21′41.00″N 85°22′33.00″W
- Translators: W227DM (93.3 MHz, Dunlap)

Links
- Public license information: Public file; LMS
- Website: www.countryroads933.com

WSDQ (93.3 FM and 1190 AM, "Country Roads 93.3"), is a radio station broadcasting a country music format. Licensed in Dunlap, Tennessee, United States, the station is currently owned by S. Travis Hickman and features a country music format with local personalities and programming along with news and features from ABC News Radio, Westwood One, and others. WSDQ's AM signal at 1190 kHz, operates as a daytime-only, Class D non-directional AM station at 5,000 watts daytime and 1,000 watts critical hours, while the co-located FM translator (W227DM 93.3 FM) is allowed to operate around the clock.

== History ==
WSDQ was first licensed and went on the air January 8, 1981 as WSVC-AM; licensed to Harry J. Morgan and Morgan Broadcasting Company. The station's application to the FCC from March 24, 1980, had originally called for the station to be licensed as a 500 watt station, which was later upgraded around 1982. Later, Morgan sold then WSVC to McMinnville, Tennessee native, Tollye Wayne Tittsworth (or "Tollye Wayne" as he used on the air), who assumed control and ownership of the stations until his death in 1999. Under his ownership the call-letters changed to WSDQ in 1986.

Following Tittsworth's death in 1999, WSDQ was later sold by his heirs to Double R Communications, LLC (later Rodgson, Inc.), which was then-owner and licensee of WEPG in nearby South Pittsburg, Tennessee. Rodgson, Inc. transferred control of the licenses to Hickman (dba Tennessee Valley Broadcasting) in 2016.

WSDQ has played a country format since it signed on the air and has always had a focus on local programming, news, sports and information for its community of license. WSDQ still utilizes the original broadcast tower, which was erected circa 1980, and which has a height of 190 feet (58 m). The tower borders the Sequatchie River along Old York Hwy East, just to the East of the Sequatchie County courthouse and town center.

Travis Hickman, the station's current owner and General Manager, has been with WSDQ since it was acquired from the Tittsworth family in 2002, and has been with sister station WEPG since 1982. As part of the format, WSDQ also filters in some Bluegrass from time to time. WSDQ is a big supporter of "The Mother Church of Country Music." The world-famous Grand Ole Opry.

WSDQ's popular morning "Tradio" classifieds show has been a staple of the station since the mid-1980s. Tradio's name changed to "Swap & Shop" to match sister station WEPG's longtime successful show of the same name, which has been a mainstay on that station since the 1950s.
