= Eddie Moore (American football) =

American football player (born 1980)

No. 58
- Position: Linebacker

Personal information
- Born: July 5, 1980 (age 46); Chattanooga, Tennessee, U.S.
- Listed height: 6 ft 0 in (1.83 m)
- Listed weight: 230 lb (104 kg)

Career information
- High school: South Pittsburg (South Pittsburg, Tennessee)
- College: Tennessee
- NFL draft: 2003: 2nd round, 49th overall pick

Career history
- Miami Dolphins (2003–2005); Denver Broncos (2007)*
- * Offseason or practice squad member only

Awards and highlights
- Second-team All-SEC (2002)

Career NFL statistics
- Tackles: 36
- Fumble recoveries: 2
- Passes defended: 2
- Stats at Pro Football Reference

Eddie Deon Moore (born July 5, 1980) is an American former professional football player who was a linebacker for the Miami Dolphins of the National Football League (NFL). A two-year starter who played college football for the Tennessee Volunteers, Moore was selected in the second round of the 2003 NFL draft by the Dolphins. However, his career was shortened by a serious knee injury.

== College career ==
Moore went to South Pittsburgh High School in South Pittsburg, Tennessee. He was a four-year letterman and two-year starter at the University of Tennessee and finished his career with 219 tackles, six sacks, 13 pass deflections, two forced fumbles and a fumble recovery. He was a team captain and MVP his senior year.

== Professional career ==
=== Miami Dolphins ===
Moore was selected by the Miami Dolphins in the second round, with the 49th overall pick of the 2003 NFL draft. Moore injured his foot in a preseason game against the Tampa Bay Buccaneers and had surgery, forcing him to miss the entire 2003 season. Moore played in 12 games during the 2004 season, starting four. He recorded 36 tackles, 12 in special teams, and two fumble recoveries. Moore was a starter until he sustained a knee injury. He was placed on injured reserve on December 28, 2004.

He tried to battle back in 2005 after undergoing two knee surgeries but was placed on injured reserve on November 2, 2005. Moore was traded to the New Orleans Saints on May 10, 2006, for Courtney Watson. However, the trade was voided when Moore failed a physical. He was waived by the Dolphins on July 28, 2006.

=== Denver Broncos ===
Moore signed a reserve/future contract with the Denver Broncos on January 16, 2007. The injuries he sustained in Miami never fully healed and he was waived/injured by the Broncos on July 30, 2007, reverting to injured reserve the next day. He was waived on August 3, 2007.
