= Shelby Rhinehart Bridge =

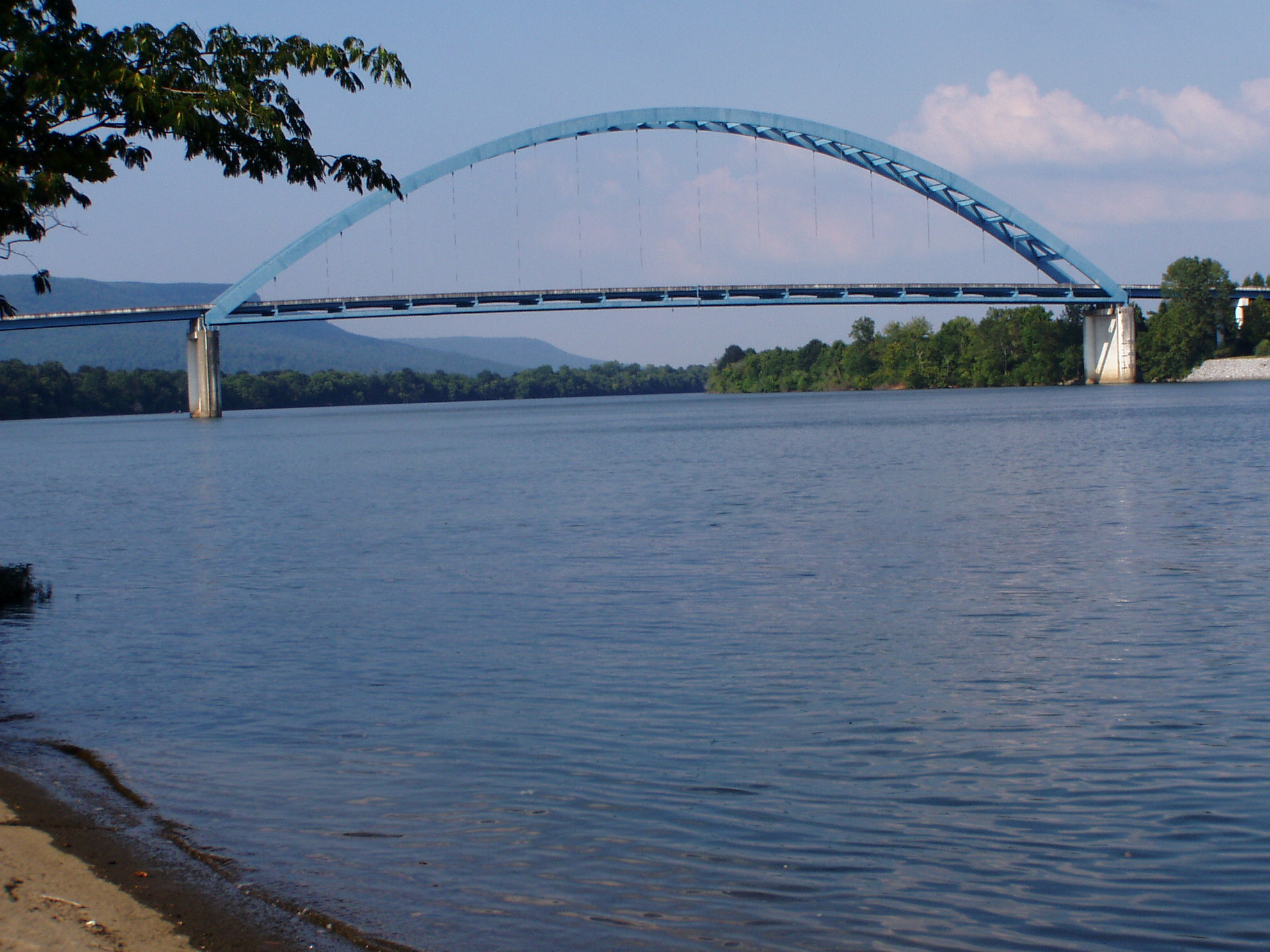
- Coordinates: 35°00′54″N 85°41′38″W
- Carries: 2 lanes of SR 156
- Crosses: Tennessee River
- Locale: South Pittsburg, Tennessee

Characteristics
- Design: Tied Arch
- Material: Steel
- Total length: 1,514 feet (461 m)
- Width: 47.9 feet (14.6 m)

History
- Designer: Tennessee Department of Transportation
- Fabrication by: American Bridge Co. of New York
- Construction end: 1981

Location
- Interactive map of Shelby Rhinehart Bridge

The Shelby Rhinehart Bridge, also known as the Blue Bridge, is a steel tied-arch bridge built in 1981. It carries Tennessee State Route 156 over the Tennessee River. It has a total length of 1,514 feet (461 m), and connects South Pittsburg, Tennessee, to New Hope, Tennessee.

== History ==
The Shelby Rhinehart Bridge replaced the South Pittsburg Ferry, which had operated for more than 75 years before the late 1970s. It was fabricated by the American Bridge Company in Pennsylvania. The bridge was completed in 1981, and was named for Shelby A. Rhinehart, a long-time Democratic member of the Tennessee General Assembly who represented the area.

== Design ==
The Shelby Rhinehart Bridge is steel-tied arch bridge that carries two lanes and shoulders of SR 156 across the Tennessee River in Marion County, immediately east of SR 156's western terminus with U.S. Route 72 in South Pittsburg. The bridge is 1,514 feet (461 m) long and its deck is 47.9 feet (14.6 m) wide. The bridge is best known for its steel arches and ties that are painted blue, earning the bridge its nickname.

== See also ==
- List of crossings of the Tennessee River
