= Marion County, Tennessee =

County in Tennessee, United States

- County
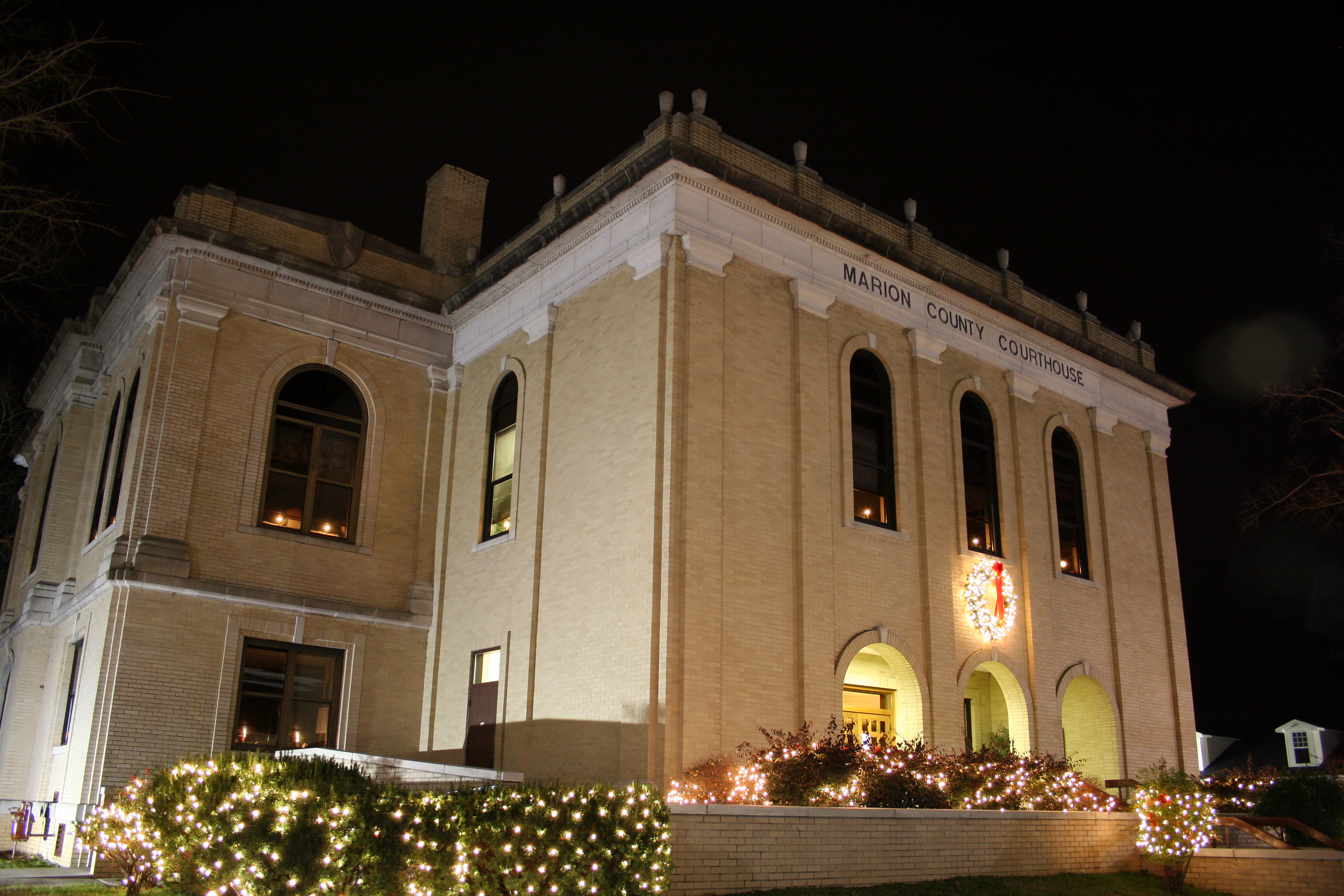
- Marion County Courthouse in Jasper

- Location within the U.S. state of Tennessee
- Coordinates: 35°08′N 85°37′W
- Country: United States
- State: Tennessee
- Founded: 1817
- Named for: Francis Marion
- Seat: Jasper
- Largest town: Jasper

Area
  - Total: 512 sq mi (1,330 km^{2})
  - Land: 498 sq mi (1,290 km^{2})
  - Water: 14 sq mi (36 km^{2}) 2.8%

Population (2020)
  - Total: 28,837
  - Estimate (2025): 29,804 ▲
  - Density: 57/sq mi (22/km^{2})
- Time zone: UTC−6 (Central)
  - Summer (DST): UTC−5 (CDT)
- Congressional district: 4th
- Website: www.marioncountytn.net

Marion County is a county located in the U.S. state of Tennessee. As of the 2020 census, the population was 28,837. Its county seat is Jasper. Marion County is part of the Chattanooga metropolitan area. Marion County is in the Central time zone, while Chattanooga proper is in the Eastern time zone.

== History ==
Marion County was established in 1817. In 1779 Cherokee chief Dragging Canoe moved down the Tennessee River from Chickamauga Creek to Running Water creek, and he helped establish the town of Nickajack at the entrance of Nickajack Cave. In 1794, the town was attacked and burned by militiamen commanded by Colonel James Orr of Nashville, Tennessee. The town was rebuilt and the Chickamauga Indians continued to live here until 1838, when all of the remaining Indians were removed from Tennessee, Alabama, and Georgia by the Trail of Tears.

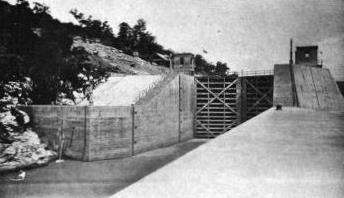
Lock at Hales Bar Dam, 1916

During the spring of 1861, early in the American Civil War, Robert Cravens of Chattanooga began mining saltpeter, the main ingredient of gunpowder, at Nickajack Cave. The operation was soon taken over by the Confederate Niter Bureau. At one point, Nickajack Cave was one of the main sources of saltpeter for the Confederate States of America. However, its operation was halted in late 1862. Nickajack Cave was visited by thousands of soldiers of both side troops, who travelled up and down the Tennessee River on steamboats.

Another important mine during the Civil War was Monteagle Saltpeter Cave, located in Cave Cove, about 4 miles (6.4 km) southeast of Monteagle. During the war, it was officially referred to as Battle Creek Cave. A 1917 visitor reported that about 25 or 30 old hoppers still remained in the cave.

By the late 19th and early 20th centuries, coal and iron mining industries had come to dominate Marion County's economy. Mines operated in Whitwell and Inman, while iron smelters were at South Pittsburg.

Hales Bar Dam, built on the Tennessee River in Marion County between 1905 and 1913, was one of the first major dams constructed in the United States across a navigable stream. in the 1960s, the Tennessee Valley Authority replaced Hales Bar with Nickajack Dam, further downstream in the 1960s, though the Hales Bar powerhouse still stands as a boathouse.

== Geography ==
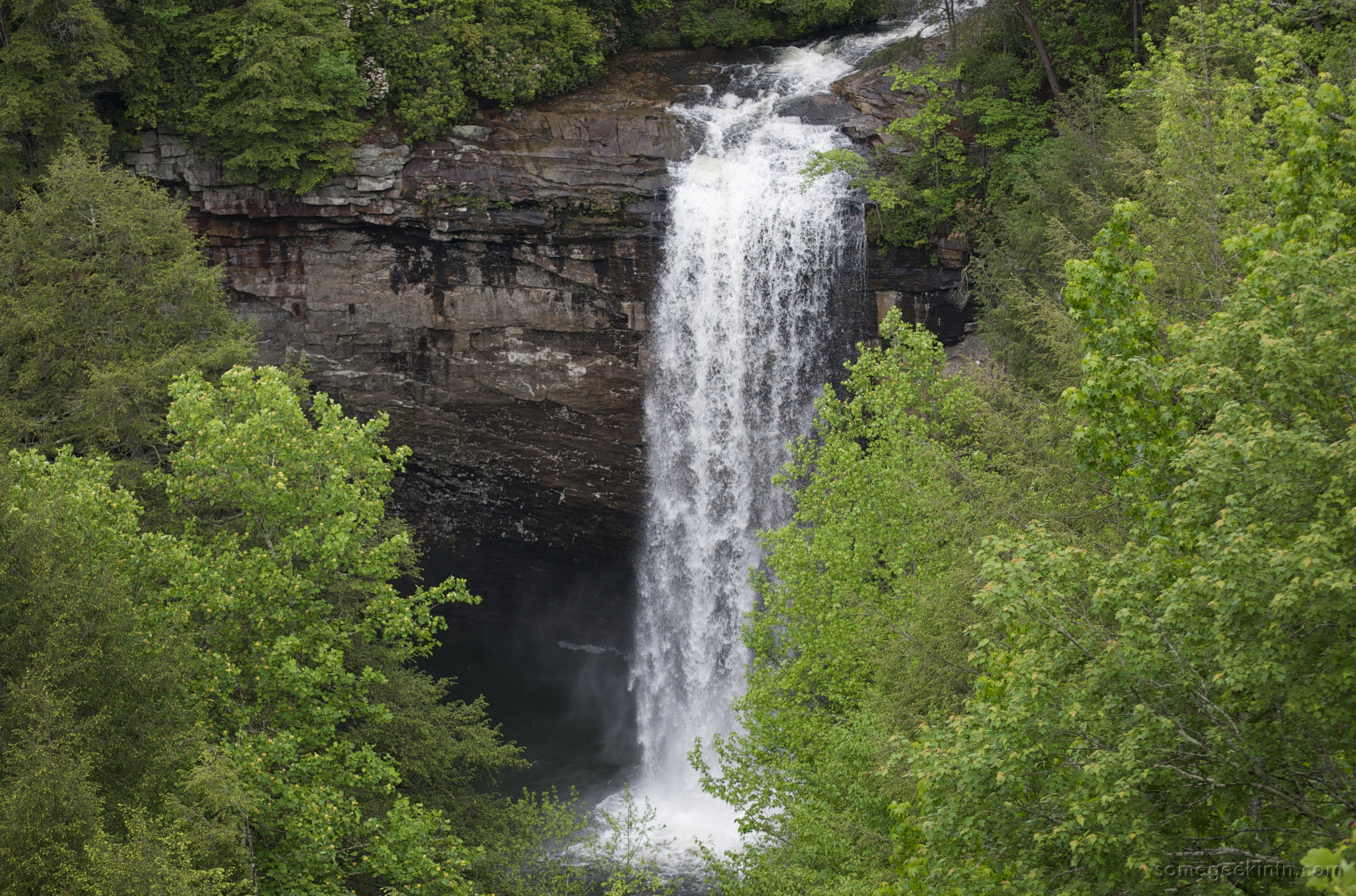
Foster Falls, at one end of the Fiery Gizzard Trail

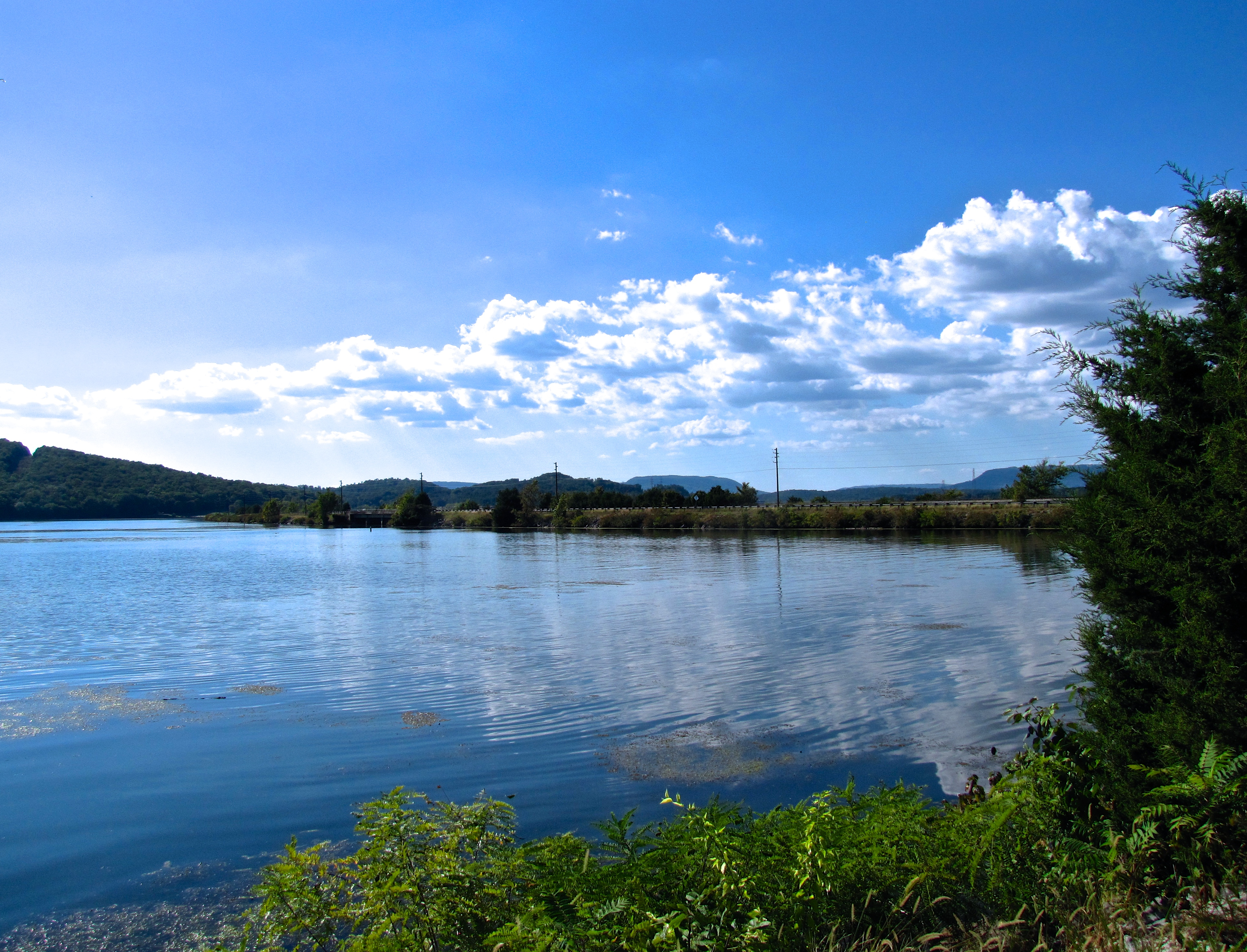
Nickajack Lake

According to the U.S. Census Bureau, the county has a total area of 512 square miles (1,330 km^{2}), of which 498 square miles (1,290 km^{2}) is land and 14 square miles (36 km^{2}) (2.8%) is water. Marion is one of three Tennessee counties, along with Bledsoe and Sequatchie, located in the Sequatchie Valley, a long, narrow valley slicing through the southeastern Cumberland Plateau. The Sequatchie River, which drains the valley, empties into the Tennessee River just south of Jasper.

Nickajack Dam is located along the Tennessee River near Jasper, creating Nickajack Lake. The section of the river immediately downstream from the dam is part of Guntersville Lake. The Raccoon Mountain Pumped-Storage Plant is located in the extreme southeastern part of the county.

=== Adjacent counties ===
- Grundy County (north)
- Sequatchie County (northeast)
- Hamilton County (east/EST Border)
- Dade County, Georgia (southeast/EST Border)
- Jackson County, Alabama (southwest)
- Franklin County (west)

=== State protected areas ===
- Chimneys State Natural Area
- Franklin State Forest (part)
- Hicks Gap State Natural Area
- Prentice Cooper State Forest
- Sequatchie Cave State Natural Area
- South Cumberland State Park (part)

== Demographics ==
Historical population
Census	Pop.	Note	%±
1820	3,888		—
1830	5,508		41.7%
1840	6,070		10.2%
1850	6,314		4.0%
1860	6,190		−2.0%
1870	6,841		10.5%
1880	10,910		59.5%
1890	15,411		41.3%
1900	17,281		12.1%
1910	18,820		8.9%
1920	17,402		−7.5%
1930	17,549		0.8%
1940	19,140		9.1%
1950	20,520		7.2%
1960	21,036		2.5%
1970	20,577		−2.2%
1980	24,416		18.7%
1990	24,860		1.8%
2000	27,776		11.7%
2010	28,237		1.7%
2020	28,837		2.1%
2025 (est.)	29,804	▲	3.4%
U.S. Decennial Census; 1790-1960 1900-1990; 1990-2000 2010-2014

=== Racial and ethnic composition ===
Marion County, Tennessee – Racial and ethnic composition Note: the US Census treats Hispanic/Latino as an ethnic category. This table excludes Latinos from the racial categories and assigns them to a separate category. Hispanics/Latinos may be of any race.
Race / Ethnicity (NH = Non-Hispanic)	Pop 1980	Pop 1990	Pop 2000	Pop 2010	Pop 2020	% 1980	% 1990	% 2000	% 2010	% 2020
White alone (NH)	23,131	23,678	26,089	26,328	25,689	94.74%	95.25%	93.93%	93.24%	89.08%
Black or African American alone (NH)	1,101	1,029	1,144	1,007	1,033	4.51%	4.14%	4.12%	3.57%	3.58%
Native American or Alaska Native alone (NH)	27	36	72	111	93	0.11%	0.14%	0.26%	0.39%	0.32%
Asian alone (NH)	19	31	57	111	148	0.08%	0.12%	0.21%	0.39%	0.51%
Native Hawaiian or Pacific Islander alone (NH)	x	x	3	1	2	x	x	0.01%	0.00%	0.01%
Other race alone (NH)	3	1	7	6	53	0.01%	0.00%	0.03%	0.02%	0.18%
Mixed race or Multiracial (NH)	x	x	202	312	1,218	x	x	0.73%	1.10%	4.22%
Hispanic or Latino (any race)	135	85	202	361	601	0.55%	0.34%	0.73%	1.28%	2.08%
Total	24,416	24,860	27,776	28,237	28,837	100.00%	100.00%	100.00%	100.00%	100.00%

=== 2020 census ===
As of the 2020 census, there were 28,837 people, 11,786 households, and 8,114 families residing in the county.

The median age was 45.2 years, 20.5% of residents were under the age of 18, and 21.1% were 65 years of age or older. For every 100 females there were 96.3 males, and for every 100 females age 18 and over there were 93.7 males age 18 and over.

The racial makeup of the county was 89.7% White, 3.6% Black or African American, 0.4% American Indian and Alaska Native, 0.5% Asian, <0.1% Native Hawaiian and Pacific Islander, 0.9% from some other race, and 4.8% from two or more races. Hispanic or Latino residents of any race comprised 2.1% of the population.

8.7% of residents lived in urban areas, while 91.3% lived in rural areas.

Of the 11,786 households, 27.8% had children under the age of 18 living in them, 49.0% were married-couple households, 18.3% were households with a male householder and no spouse or partner present, and 26.3% were households with a female householder and no spouse or partner present. About 26.8% of all households were made up of individuals and 13.1% had someone living alone who was 65 years of age or older.

There were 13,578 housing units, of which 13.2% were vacant. Among occupied housing units, 76.5% were owner-occupied and 23.5% were renter-occupied. The homeowner vacancy rate was 1.3% and the rental vacancy rate was 9.0%.

=== 2010 census ===
As of the 2010 census, there were 28,237 people, 11,403 households, and 8,030 families residing in the county. The population density was 57 inhabitants per square mile (22/km^{2}). There were 12,954 housing units at an average density of 26 units per square mile (10/km^{2}).

The racial makeup of the county was 93.9% White (non-Hispanic), 3.6% Black or African American, 0.4% Native American, 0.21% Asian, 0.01% Pacific Islander, 0.27% from other races, and 1.2% from two or more races. 1.3% of the population were Hispanic or Latino of any race.

In the county, the population was spread out, with 22.80% under the age of 18 and 8.9% who were 65 years of age or older. The median age was 43.9 years. The female population was 50.9%.

The median income for a household in the county was $31,419, and the median income for a family was $36,351. Males had a median income of $30,236 versus $21,778 for females. The per capita income for the county was $16,419. About 10.80% of families and 14.10% of the population were below the poverty line, including 20.00% of those under age 18 and 14.30% of those age 65 or over.

== Education ==
The schools in Marion County are:

- Jasper Elementary School
- Jasper Middle School
- Marion County High School
- Monteagle Elementary School
- South Pittsburg Elementary
- South Pittsburg High School
- Whitwell Elementary School
- Whitwell Middle School
- Whitwell High School
- Richard Hardy Memorial School

== Media ==
Marion County is served by numerous local, regional and national media outlets which reach approximately one million people in four states including: Tennessee, Alabama, Georgia and North Carolina.

=== Newspapers ===
- The Marion Tribune launched in August 2023 and is the only legal newspaper in Marion County. The website is mariontribune.com. The Marion Tribune is owned by parent company Lakeway Publishers, Inc. headquartered in Morristown, Tennessee.

=== Radio ===
Marion County is part of the Chattanooga Arbitron radio market. The following radio stations are licensed to cities within Marion County:

AM

- WEPG 910 AM – Country (Licensed to South Pittsburg)

FM

- WUUQ 97.3 – Classic Country Q-97.3/99.3 (Licensed to South Pittsburg)
- W285FW 104.9 – 104.9 The River WEPG (FM translator for WEPG-AM Licensed to South Pittsburg)
- WJCR-LP-94.7 – Jasper Christ-Centered Radio (Licensed to Jasper)

=== Television ===
Marion County is part of the Chattanooga DMA. Cable TV companies in Marion County include Charter Communications and Trinity Cable

== Transportation ==
=== Airport ===
Marion County Airport, also known as Brown Field, is a county-owned, public-use airport located four nautical miles (7 km) southeast of the central business district of Jasper.

=== Roads ===
- I-24
- US 41
- US 64
- US 72
- SR 2
- SR 27
- SR 28
- SR 56
- SR 108
- SR 134
- SR 156
- SR 283
- SR 377
- SR 422
- Orme Mountain Road

== Parks and natural features ==
Nickajack Cave in Marion County, located 0.6 miles south of Shellmound Station on the west side of the Tennessee River, is one of the most historical caves in Tennessee. It is currently part of a park run by the city of New Hope. A paved hiking trail leads to an observation deck at the entrance to the cave where visitors can watch the bats leave the cave at dusk. The cave was used by tourists and as a show cave, but in 1968 the cave was flooded when Tennessee Valley Authority constructed Nickajack Dam 6 miles (9.7 km) downstream to replace the aging Hales Bar Dam.

== Communities ==
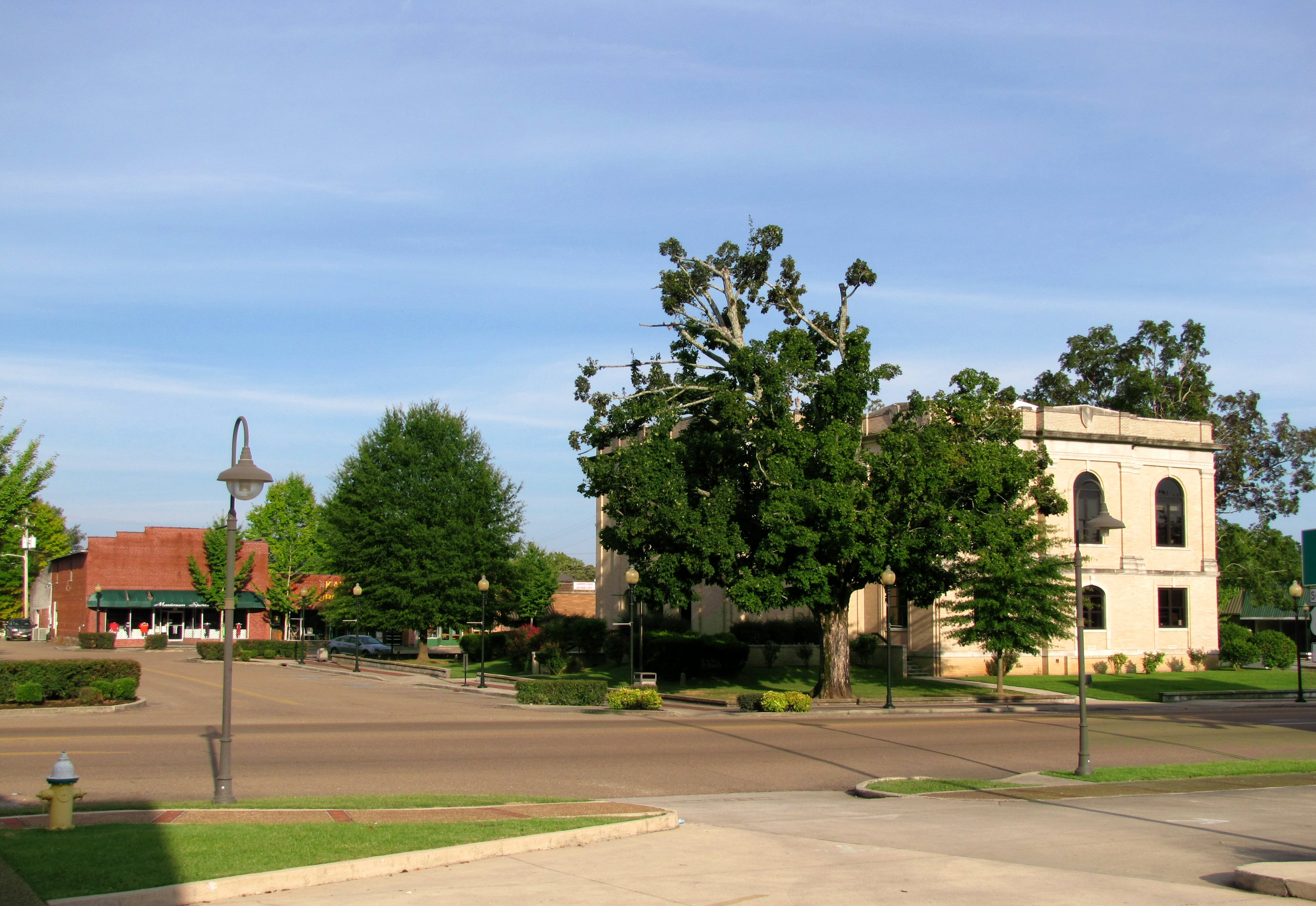
Jasper

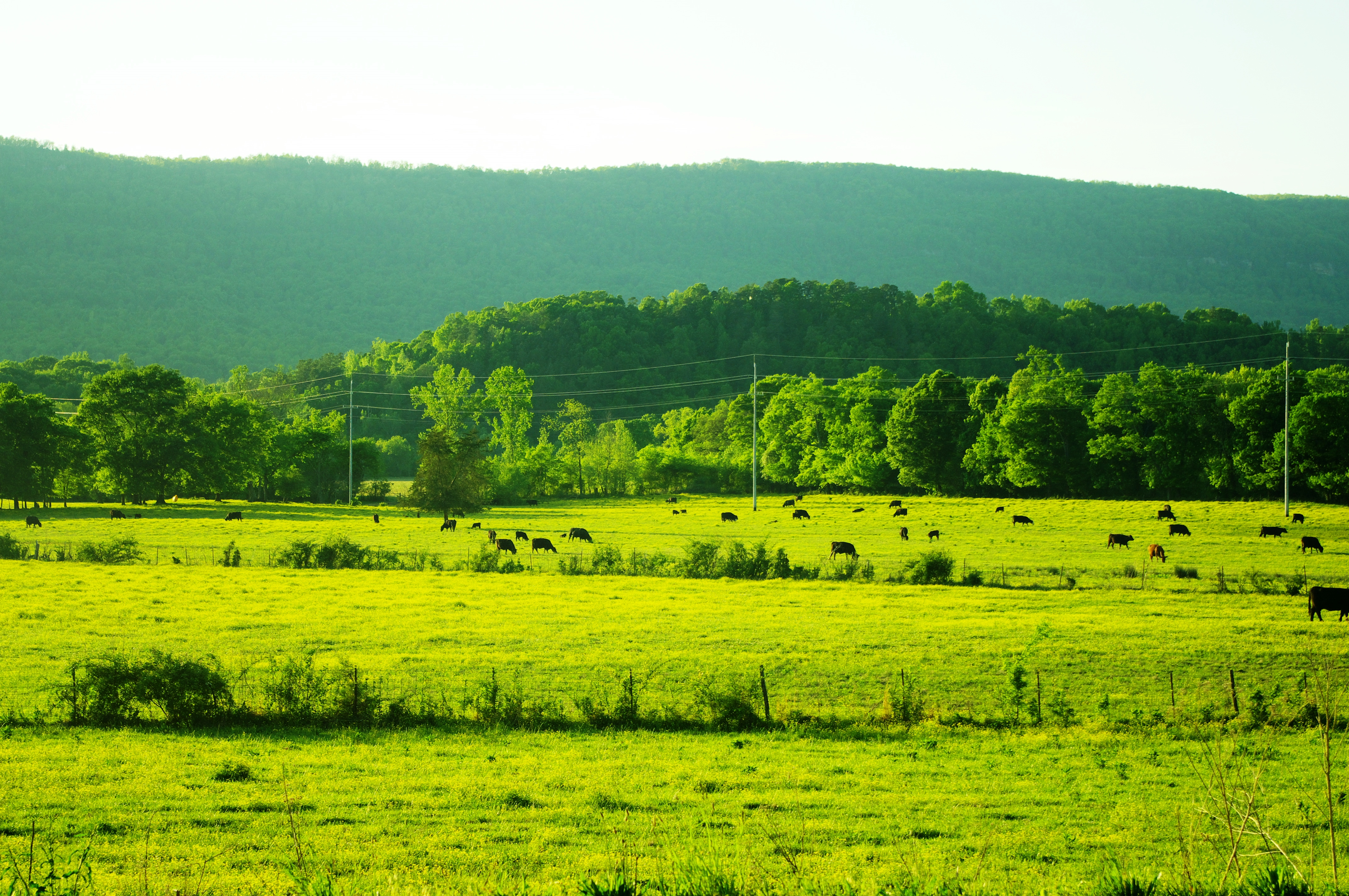
Farm near Powells Crossroads

=== Cities ===
- New Hope
- South Pittsburg
- Whitwell

=== Towns ===
- Jasper (county seat)
- Kimball
- Monteagle (also in Franklin and Grundy Counties)
- Orme
- Powells Crossroads

=== Census-designated places ===
- Griffith Creek
- Sequatchie
- Whiteside (formerly Running Water)

=== Unincorporated communities ===
- Aetna
- Haletown
- Jasper Highlands
- Mineral Springs
- Suck Creek

== Politics ==
Prior to 2004, Marion County was a Democratic-leaning swing county in presidential elections, backing the national winner in all but five elections from 1912 to 2004. Since then, it has become increasingly Republican similar to the rest of rural Tennessee, with Republican presidential candidates winning by increasing margins in each election from 2004 on. Donald Trump won the county in 2020 by a margin of nearly 51 points, the widest in the county's electoral history from 1912 on for a candidate of any party. However, Democrats remain active in local politics in Marion County. In the August 2026 county general election, Democrats won the offices of County Mayor, County Trustee, and County Clerk.

United States presidential election results for Marion County, Tennessee
Year	Republican		Democratic		Third party(ies)	
Year	No.	%	No.	%	No.	%
1912	463	25.88%	810	45.28%	516	28.84%
1916	1,432	54.22%	1,155	43.73%	54	2.04%
1920	2,662	58.12%	1,874	40.92%	44	0.96%
1924	1,074	48.55%	1,036	46.84%	102	4.61%
1928	1,659	58.83%	1,161	41.17%	0	0.00%
1932	1,406	38.86%	2,212	61.14%	0	0.00%
1936	1,770	39.92%	2,664	60.08%	0	0.00%
1940	2,158	39.71%	3,242	59.65%	35	0.64%
1944	1,761	38.85%	2,666	58.81%	106	2.34%
1948	1,738	38.91%	2,554	57.17%	175	3.92%
1952	2,227	42.91%	2,938	56.61%	25	0.48%
1956	2,925	50.45%	2,781	47.96%	92	1.59%
1960	2,657	45.30%	3,124	53.27%	84	1.43%
1964	2,728	41.95%	3,775	58.05%	0	0.00%
1968	1,959	30.59%	1,661	25.94%	2,784	43.47%
1972	3,711	63.56%	1,929	33.04%	199	3.41%
1976	2,965	38.80%	4,615	60.39%	62	0.81%
1980	3,902	45.10%	4,623	53.44%	126	1.46%
1984	4,337	52.06%	3,942	47.32%	52	0.62%
1988	4,407	51.14%	4,175	48.45%	36	0.42%
1992	3,262	32.40%	5,589	55.51%	1,217	12.09%
1996	3,166	34.45%	5,194	56.51%	831	9.04%
2000	4,651	45.38%	5,441	53.08%	158	1.54%
2004	5,862	51.01%	5,548	48.28%	82	0.71%
2008	6,746	58.98%	4,506	39.40%	185	1.62%
2012	6,272	60.26%	3,953	37.98%	184	1.77%
2016	7,696	70.85%	2,832	26.07%	334	3.07%
2020	9,911	74.77%	3,177	23.97%	168	1.27%
2024	10,788	77.43%	3,026	21.72%	119	0.85%

== Notable people ==
- Eddie Brown, NFL player
- Jon Coffelt (b. May 16, 1963) Artist who was born in Dunlap, Tennessee, raised in Griffith Creek.
- Leslie Rogers Darr, United States District Judge, Eastern District of Tennessee
- Dragging Canoe, Cherokee leader, lived in the town of Running Water at the mouth of Running Water creek on the Tennessee River.
- Travis Randall McDonough, United States District Judge, Eastern District of Tennessee
- John T. Raulston, Judge who presided over the Scopes Trial in 1925.
- Sequoyah, Cherokee scholar, lived in the Marion County area.
- Peter Turney, Governor of Tennessee and Chief Justice of the Tennessee Supreme Court, was born in Jasper.
- Eric Westmoreland, NFL player
- Jacob Saylors, Professional running back for the Detroit Lions of the National Football League and former member of the St. Louis Battlehawks and East Tennessee State Buccaneers football team

== See also ==
- National Register of Historic Places listings in Marion County, Tennessee
