= Suck Creek, Tennessee =

Unincorporated community in Tennessee, US

Coordinates: 35°10′51″N 85°25′36″W

Suck Creek is an unincorporated community in Hamilton and Marion Counties, in the U.S. state of Tennessee.

== History ==
Suck Creek was named for the conditions in the Tennessee River which posed a hazard to pioneer travelers.
