= Aetna, Marion County, Tennessee =

Unincorporated community in Tennessee, US

Coordinates: 35°00′43″N 85°29′41″W

Aetna is an unincorporated community in Marion County, Tennessee, United States. It lies at an elevation of 1696 feet (517 m). Aetna was named after the Sicilian volcano, Mount Etna.
