= Mineral Springs, Marion County, Tennessee =

Mineral Springs, Tennessee
- Unincorporated community
- Location within Tennessee Location within the United States
- Coordinates: 35°05′25″N 85°32′04″W
- Country: United States
- State: Tennessee
- County: Marion
- Elevation: 679 ft (207 m)
- Time zone: UTC-6 (Central (CST))
  - Summer (DST): UTC-5 (CDT)
- Area code: 423
- GNIS feature ID: 1294038

Mineral Springs is an unincorporated community in Marion County, Tennessee, United States.
