= Mountain View Christian Academy =

Location
- 3665 Alabama Highway 73; Bryant, Alabama 35958; United States; 34°54′20″N 85°37′57″W

Information
- Type: Private
- Religious affiliation: Christian
- Established: 1982 (44 years ago)
- CEEB code: 010547
- Faculty: 14 (on FTE basis) (2021-22)
- Grades: K-4 to 12
- Enrollment: 91 (2021–22)
- Student to teacher ratio: 6.5:1 (2021-22)
- Mascot: Lions
- Nickname: MVCA
- Accreditation: Association of Christian Teachers and Schools
- Website: www.mvcalions.com

Mountain View Christian Academy was a private K-12 Christian school founded in 1982 and located in Bryant, Alabama, USA. The school closed in 2024. The school is accredited through the Association of Christian Teachers and Schools (ACTS) and is also a member of the Association of Christian Schools International.

== Church affiliation ==
Mountain View Christian Academy is a non-denominational ministry of the Mountain View Church of God.
