= Whiteside, Tennessee =

- Unincorporated community
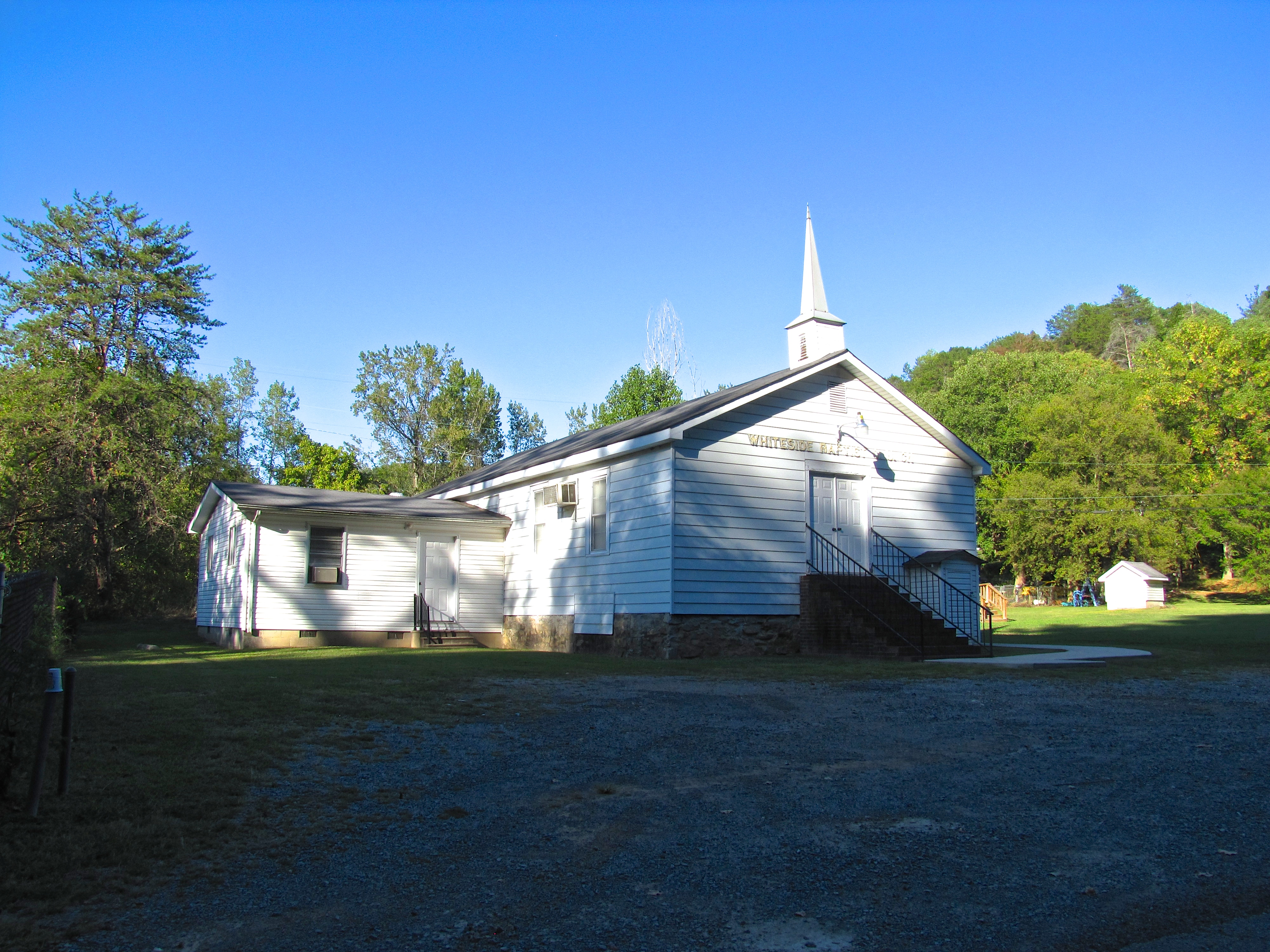
- Whiteside Baptist Church

- Location within Tennessee Location within the United States
- Coordinates: 34°59′14″N 85°29′52″W
- Country: United States
- State: Tennessee
- County: Marion

Area
  - Total: 3.96 sq mi (10.25 km^{2})
  - Land: 3.96 sq mi (10.25 km^{2})
  - Water: 0 sq mi (0.00 km^{2})
- Elevation: 797 ft (243 m)

Population (2020)
  - Total: 274
  - Density: 69.3/sq mi (26.74/km^{2})
- Time zone: UTC-6 (Central (CST))
  - Summer (DST): UTC-5 (CDT)
- ZIP code: 37396
- Area code: 423
- GNIS feature ID: 1314101

Whiteside (formerly Aetna, Etna and Running Water) is an unincorporated community in Marion County, Tennessee. It was originally settled as a Cherokee town in the late eighteenth century.

After Indian Removal, European-American settlers moved in and later named it after James Anderson Whiteside (1803–1861), attorney, Chattanooga railroad promoter and land investor. It lies at an elevation of 807 feet (246 m). Tennessee State Route 134 passes by Whiteside, which is located between Chattanooga and Haletown, just north of the Tennessee-Georgia state line. Interstate 24 also passes through the community.

== Demographics ==
Historical population
Census	Pop.	Note	%±
2020	274		—
U.S. Decennial Census

== History ==
For the decade preceding his death in 1792, Cherokee war chief Dragging Canoe lived at Running Water (Cherokee: ᎠᎼᎦᏳᎾᏱ, romanized: Amogayunayi), a Chickamauga town. He and his Cherokee followers were opposed to European-American settlement in their lands; they moved to more distant areas of the frontier to avoid the Americans.

The community of Whiteside developed later at this site, named for a major railway investor. Shortly before the Civil War, a railway was constructed in this area. The terrain required also the construction of a tunnel and bridge. Colonel James Whiteside was a major stockholder in the East Tennessee and Georgia Railroad. It took over construction of what is known as Whiteside Tunnel in 1858 through Missionary Ridge near Chattanooga when the Chattanooga, Harrison, Georgetown & Charleston Railroad went bankrupt. The tunnel is 986 feet (301 m) long. This railroad was later acquired by the Southern Railway (now the Norfolk-Southern) for its Knoxville-to-Birmingham main route.

The Whiteside bridge was constructed on another part of the route. Confederate troops destroyed it during the Civil War, but Union forces rebuilt the Whiteside trestle in 1863, for what was then known as the Nashville & Chattanooga Railroad. This structure washed away in a flood in 1867. The next bridge, also a single span, lasted to 1924. A double-span bridge was added to this area.

These were considered important strategic structures. After the tunnel was abandoned, because of changes in rail standards and patterns of use, it was donated in 1968 to the Tennessee Valley Railroad Museum. The Whiteside Tunnel was listed on the National Register of Historic Places in 1978, as NRHP 78002595. The Whiteside structures were integral to the passage of freight and passengers through the Tennessee River valley from Chattanooga to points west.

The Tennessee River did not become navigable west of Chattanooga, as an alternate route, until after construction of the Hales Bar Dam and associated locks, which opened in 1913.
