= Hooker, Georgia =

Unincorporated community in Georgia, U.S.

Coordinates: 34°58′44″N 85°26′02″W

Hooker is an unincorporated community in Dade County, in the U.S. state of Georgia.

== History ==
A post office called Hooker was established in 1890, and remained in operation until 1896. The community was named after Joseph Hooker (1814–1879), American Civil War major general.
