= South Pittsburg High School =

Location
- 717 Elm Avenue; South Pittsburg, Tennessee 37380; United States; 35°00′21″N 85°42′35″W

Information
- Type: Public
- Established: 1924
- School district: Marion County Schools
- Faculty: 35 teachers
- Grades: 7–12
- Enrollment: 420 (2023–2024)
- Colors: Orange; Black
- Athletics conference: TSSAA
- Mascot: Pirate
- Website: www.southpittsburghigh.org

South Pittsburg High School (SPHS) is a high school in South Pittsburg, Tennessee, United States. It is part of Marion County Schools. The school was established in 1924.

== Athletics ==
The SPHS Pirates compete in TSSAA's east grand division and 3rd athletic district. The school plays baseball, basketball, football, golf, soccer (Note: Co-op with Marion County High School (Tennessee)), softball, track and field, volleyball, wrestling.

The Pirates claim the following state titles:

- Baseball
  - Champions: 1996
- Football
  - Champions: 2025, 2023, 2021, 2010, 2007, 1999, 1994, 1969
  - Runner-Up: 2024, 2020, 2013, 2011, 2009, 1986, 1985, 1974
- Boys' Track and Field
  - Individual Champions: 2024, 2023
