= Bryant, Alabama =

Unincorporated community in Alabama, United States

- Unincorporated community
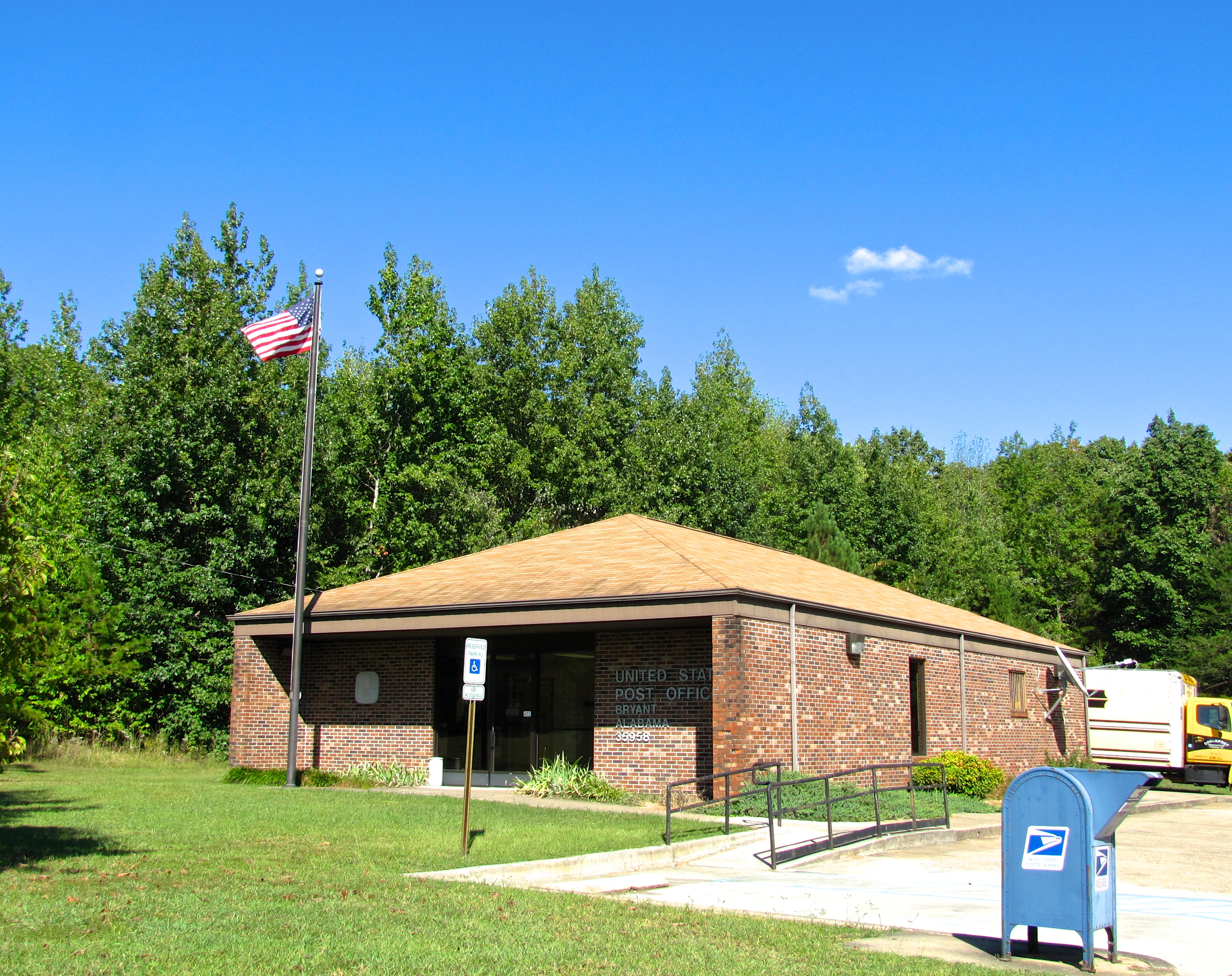
- Bryant post office

- Location within Alabama Location within the United States
- Coordinates: 34°56′37″N 85°37′56″W
- Country: United States
- State: Alabama
- County: Jackson

Area
  - Land: 19.296 sq mi (49.977 km^{2})
  - Water: 0.0015 sq mi (0.004 km^{2})
- Elevation: 1,631 ft (497 m)

Population (2010)
  - Total: 3,582
- Time zone: UTC-6 (Central (CST))
  - Summer (DST): UTC-5 (CDT)
- ZIP code: 35958
- Area code: 256
- GNIS feature ID: 115080

Bryant is an unincorporated community in Jackson County, Alabama, United States. At the 2000 census the population was 3,295.

== Geography ==
Bryant covers a land area of 19.296 square miles (49.98 km^{2}) and a water area of 0.004 square miles (0.010 km^{2}).

== Demographics ==
At the 2010 census, there were 3,582 people. The population density was 65.9 persons per square mile. The racial makeup of the town was 95.6% White, 0.3% Black, 1.5% American Indian and Alaska Native, and 1.9% from two or more races. 1.3% of the population were Hispanic or Latino of any race.

In Bryant the population was spread out, with 23.2% under the age of 18 and 15.6% who were 64 years of age or older. Marriage status: 16.9% never married, 67.1% now married, 5.8% widowed, and 10.2% divorced.

The per capita income for Bryant was $20,113. About 13.7% of the population were below the poverty line.

== Education ==
Bryant is home to Bryant Elementary School, which is part of the Jackson County School System.

Bryant is also home to Mountain View Christian Academy, a private Christian school with Pre-school through 12th grade.
