= New Hope, Tennessee =

- Town
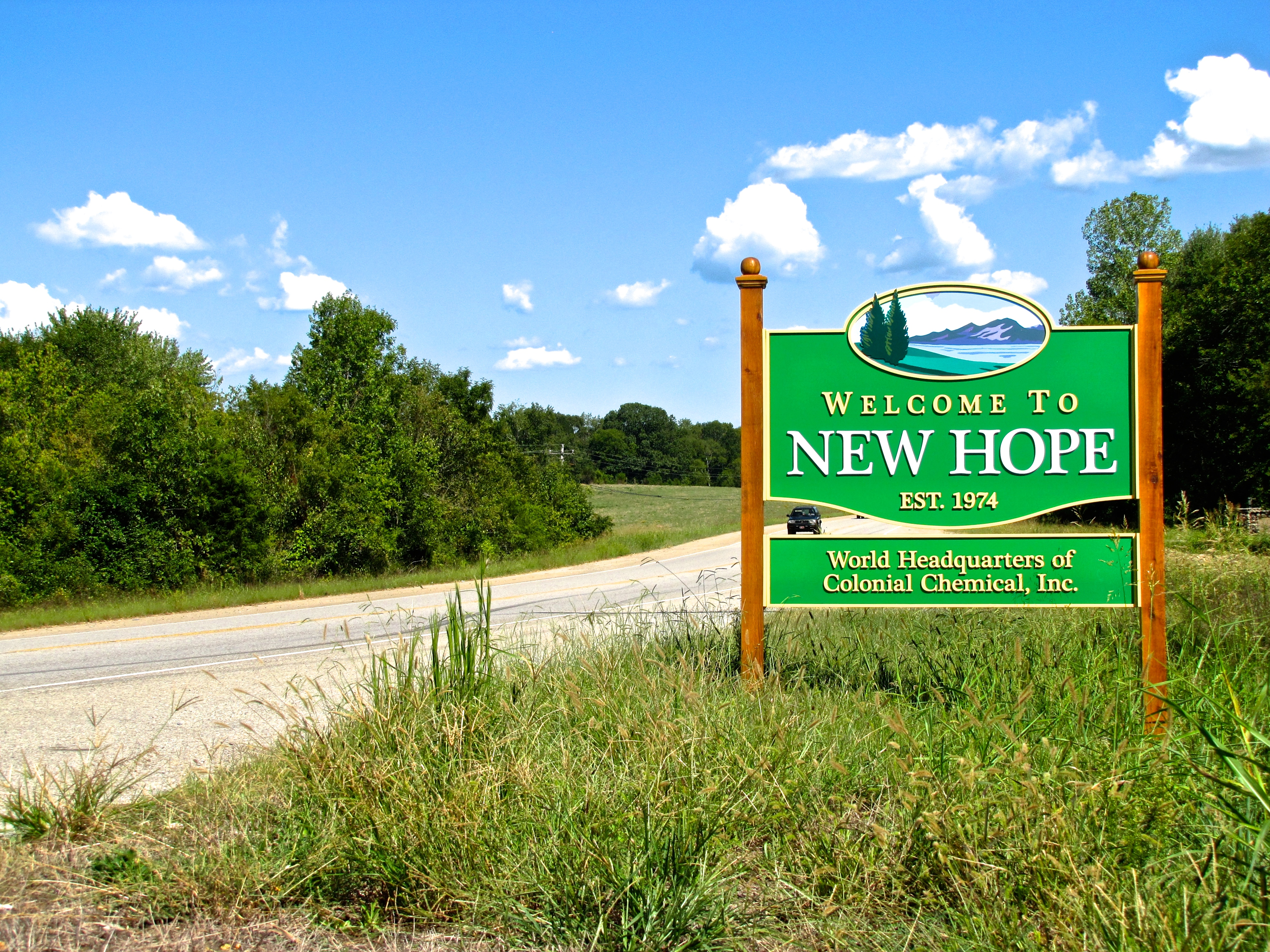

- Location of New Hope in Marion County, Tennessee.
- Coordinates: 35°0′0″N 85°39′12″W
- Country: United States
- State: Tennessee
- County: Marion

Area
  - Total: 10.4 sq mi (26.9 km^{2})
  - Land: 10.3 sq mi (26.7 km^{2})
  - Water: 0.039 sq mi (0.1 km^{2})
- Elevation: 715 ft (218 m)

Population (2020)
  - Total: 987
  - Density: 100/sq mi (39/km^{2})
- Time zone: UTC-6 (Central (CST))
  - Summer (DST): UTC-5 (CDT)
- ZIP code: 37380
- Area code: 423
- FIPS code: 47-52780
- GNIS feature ID: 1310070

New Hope is a town in Marion County, Tennessee, United States. The population is 987. It is part of the Chattanooga, TN–GA Metropolitan Statistical Area.

== History ==
Originally known as Antioch, New Hope incorporated in 1974 to avoid an annexation attempt by South Pittsburg, which most of the new city's residents opposed. The name "New Hope" was taken from a local church and cemetery. It is located on the eastern shore of the Tennessee River at the Alabama/Tennessee state line. Early settlers and travelers reached New Hope from the western shore by the South Pittsburg Ferry (called "Sharon") on the river until the construction of the Shelby Rhinehart Bridge (Blue Bridge) in 1981.

== Geography ==
New Hope is located at 35°0′0″N 85°39′12″W (35.000112, -85.653332). The city occupies the south side of a U-shaped bend of the Tennessee River, mostly downstream from Nickajack Dam. The city's municipal boundary stretches southward to the Tennessee-Alabama state line. South Pittsburg lies across the river to the west, Kimball and Jasper lie across the river to the north, and Nickajack Lake lies to the east. State Route 156 spans New Hope from east-to-west, connecting the city with U.S. Route 72 in South Pittsburg and Interstate 24 near Haletown.

According to the United States Census Bureau, the city has a total area of 10.4 square miles (27 km^{2}), of which 10.3 square miles (27 km^{2}) is land and 0.1 square miles (0.26 km^{2}) (0.58%) is water.

== Demographics ==
Historical population
Census	Pop.	Note	%±
1980	681		—
1990	854		25.4%
2000	1,043		22.1%
2010	1,082		3.7%
2020	987		−8.8%

=== 2020 Census ===
As of the census of 2020, there were 987 people, 403 households, and 213 families residing in the town (59 households with children under 18). The median age of the town was 48.1 years (49.4% male and 50.6% female). 68.1% of the population is over the age of 18.

The median income for a household in New Hope, TN was $46,607, and the median income for a family was $56,736 (for married couples it was $61,875).

Homeownership in New Hope, TN was 90.5% over a wide spectrum of housing values, with 76.4% representing homes of 2-3 bedrooms.

52.1% reported as employed, the largest group in construction (18.1%). Of those employed, 66% work locally. 23.5% of the population were at or below the poverty line. 17.6% of the people in New Hope were reported as disabled.

Ethnic makeup of New Hope, TN in 2020 was 0.2% American Indian, 0.7% Asian, 0.2% Black or African American, 0.2% Hispanic, 6.0 Mixed Race(s), and 92.8% White.

== Government ==
New Hope is governed by an elected body of aldermen and a mayor. As of 2023 Mark Myers was mayor. The City Hall of New Hope is located at 2610 Highway 156. The headquarters for the New Hope Fire Department is located across the highway from the Town Hall, where volunteers may serve in the community. The station is also used as a polling location for Marion County during elections. The New Hope City Park was formerly behind the Fire Station. On October 24, 2022, Charles and Michael King filed a lawsuit against New Hope requesting the removal of encroachments on property deeded by their father to the town for use of a volunteer fire department structure. On July 17, 2023, six of the eight New Hope volunteer firefighters resigned and held a press conference in protest, claiming hostile workplace with old gear. The neighboring South Pittsburg and Kimball Volunteer Fire Departments will cover New Hope under the direction of an appointed Fire Chief and assistant.

== Culture ==
Author William Least Heat-Moon mentions New Hope, Tennessee in Blue Highways: A Journey into America, published in 1982 by Little, Brown and Company, chronicling the author's 12000-mile trip in remote places around the United States. Festival Opera presented Carlisle Floyd’s “Susannah,” July 12 and 14, 2019, at the Lesher Center for the Arts in Walnut Creek, CA. Dubbed as “an American tale of innocence, lust, and social consequence,” the opera centers on the main character, 18-year-old Susannah Polk, a typical teenager entering womanhood in the quiet mountain town of New Hope, Tennessee, when she finds herself bereft of hope as she becomes the target of ruthless and malicious gossip.

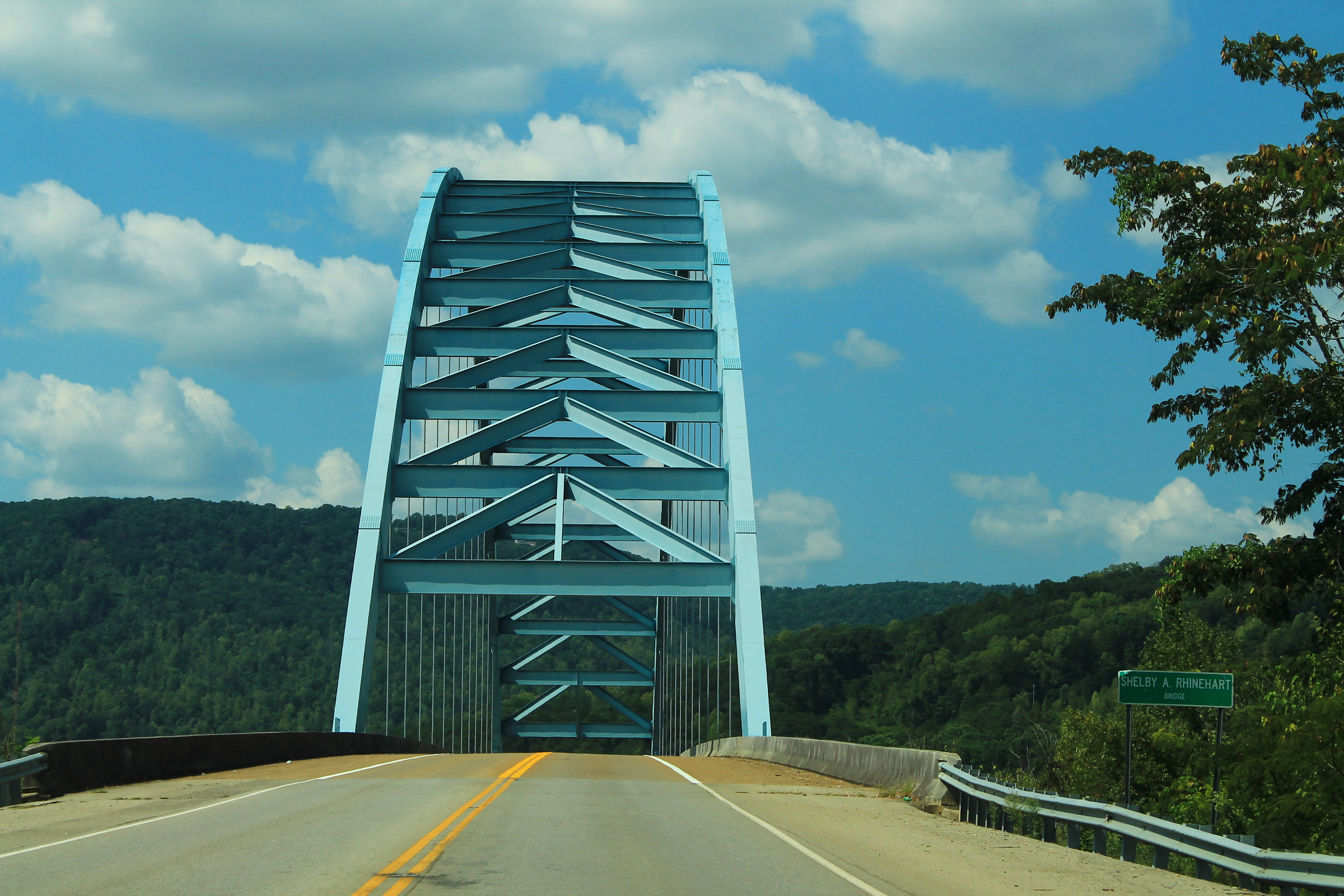
Shelby Rhinehart Bridge over Tennessee River at New Hope

== Points of interest ==
Nickajack Dam, on the eastern edge of New Hope near Hwy 156 on the Tennessee River, is a hydroelectric facility with four generating units and a summer net dependable capacity of 107 megawatts.

New Hope is home to the Maple View Public Use Area, located adjacent to Nickajack Cave Wildlife Refuge and home to federally endangered bats. In one evening in June 2019, representatives from Tennessee Valley Authority and Tennessee Wildlife Resources Agency counted 97,026 bats leaving to feed and returning to the cave. Chattanooga Guided Adventures operates a dusk kayak tour from Maple View to the cave daily between March and October.

== Economy ==
A $500,000 Appalachian Regional Commission grant will assist with the construction of a rail spur to provide rail service into Nickajack Port Industrial Park in New Hope and enable Colonial Chemical Inc. to move forward with its planned expansion. Groundbreaking for this project was held at Colonial Chemical on April 15, 2022.

In March 2023, it was announced that Red Moon Development, an Arizona-based RV park developer, has shown interest in building a 250 to 400 space facility alongside the Tennessee River, north of Highway 156. A petition critical to rezoning this property for commercial use was circulated among New Hope residents to be presented at a future Town Hall meeting. On July 4, 2023, it was announced that the property for the RV park was "back on the market," indicating that the developer's plans to purchase the land have ceased.
