= South Pittsburg, Tennessee =

- City
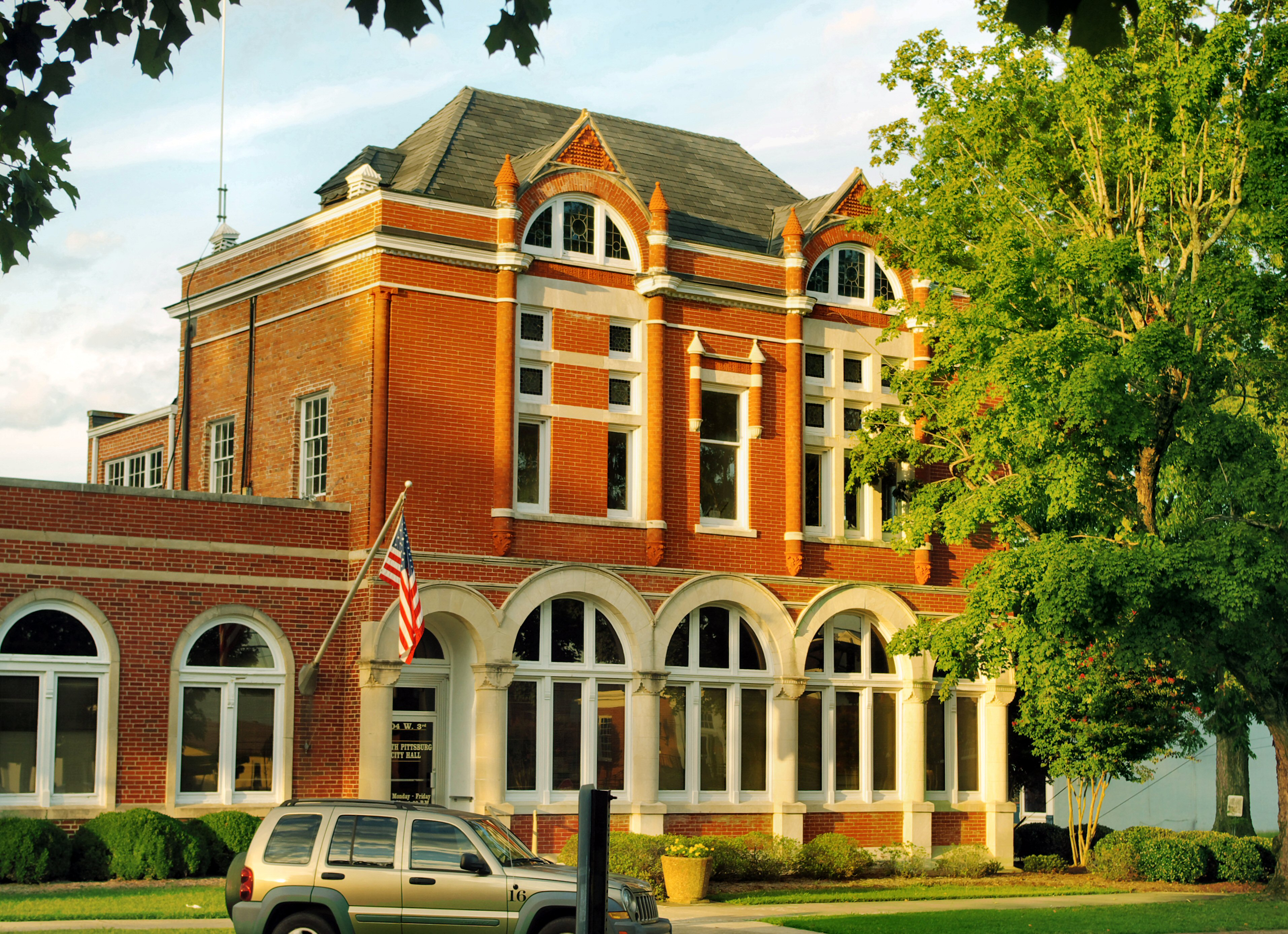
- South Pittsburg City Hall

- Location of South Pittsburg in Marion County, Tennessee.
- Coordinates: 35°0′30″N 85°42′38″W
- Country: United States
- State: Tennessee
- County: Marion

Area
  - Total: 8.22 sq mi (21.29 km^{2})
  - Land: 8.22 sq mi (21.29 km^{2})
  - Water: 0 sq mi (0.00 km^{2})
- Elevation: 633 ft (193 m)

Population (2020)
  - Total: 3,106
  - Density: 377.9/sq mi (145.89/km^{2})
- Time zone: UTC-6 (Central (CST))
  - Summer (DST): UTC-5 (CDT)
- ZIP code: 37380
- Area code: 423
- FIPS code: 47-70060
- GNIS feature ID: 1314091
- Website: southpittsburg-tn.org

South Pittsburg is a city in Marion County, Tennessee, United States. It is part of the Chattanooga, TN–GA Metropolitan Statistical Area. The population was 3,106 at the 2020 census. South Pittsburg is home to the National Cornbread Festival.

== History ==
What is now South Pittsburg remained a primarily agrarian area until the construction of a branch line of the Nashville and Chattanooga Railroad (later the Nashville, Chattanooga and St. Louis Railway) into the Sequatchie Valley in the late 1860s. Small-scale mining operations began during this period. When a post office was opened in 1869, the community was called Battle Creek Mines.

In the mid-1870s, several British investors formed the Southern States Coal, Iron and Land Company, in hopes of establishing a major industrial operation in the Sequatchie Valley. The company dispatched James Bowron to investigate the area for potential town and manufacturing sites. Bowron chose the Whitwell and Victoria areas in northwestern Marion County for the company's coal mining and coke production operations, and the Battle Creek Mines area as the company's iron production center and commercial hub. The latter site was chosen primarily for its immediate access to both the railroad and the Tennessee River. On May 23, 1876, the name of the Battle Creek Mines post office was changed to "South Pittsburg" in hopes that the city would one day grow to become a great iron manufacturing center like Pittsburgh, Pennsylvania.

The death of Bowron in 1877, along with several other key company officials within a short period of time, halted the Southern States operation. In 1882, the company was purchased by the Tennessee Coal, Iron and Railroad Company (TCI), which resumed the development of the mining and iron production facilities. In 1886, the townsite of South Pittsburg was purchased by Nashville banker William Duncan, who helped organize the South Pittsburg City Company in December of that year. The town was platted by F. P. Clute, and incorporated in 1887 with John G. Kelly as its first mayor. This revival of the city's development roughly coincided with the completion of two large blast furnaces and a foundry, allowing large-scale iron production to begin. South Pittsburg experienced rapid growth in the 1890s, but struggled after TCI relocated to Alabama.

In 1906, the Dixie-Portland Cement Company (later Penn-Dixie) established a cement production center in what was then known as the Deptford area, south of South Pittsburg. The company hired New York insurance executive Richard Hardy to oversee the development of a company town, which became known as "Richard City" after Hardy. After becoming president of the company in 1914, Hardy initiated a major expansion project in Richard City. Many of the town's houses, churches, businesses, and even utility poles were constructed using the company's cement. The plant operated until 1980, when Penn-Dixie went out of business. The site was later purchased by Vulcan Materials. Richard City was annexed by South Pittsburg in 1985.

== Geography ==
South Pittsburg is located at 35°0′30″N 85°42′38″W (35.008342, -85.710645). The city is situated in the southwestern Sequatchie Valley between the Cumberland Plateau on the west and the Tennessee River (Guntersville Lake) on the east. Two steep ridges— Whitacre Point on the north and Lodge Point on the south— extend outward from the Plateau to "wall in" the main portion of the city on the north, west, and south. The Richard City area lies opposite Lodge Point to the south, and the Battle Creek area lies opposite Whitacre Point to the north. At an elevation of approximately 630 ft (190 m), South Pittsburg is the lowest incorporated city in the East Tennessee Grand Division.

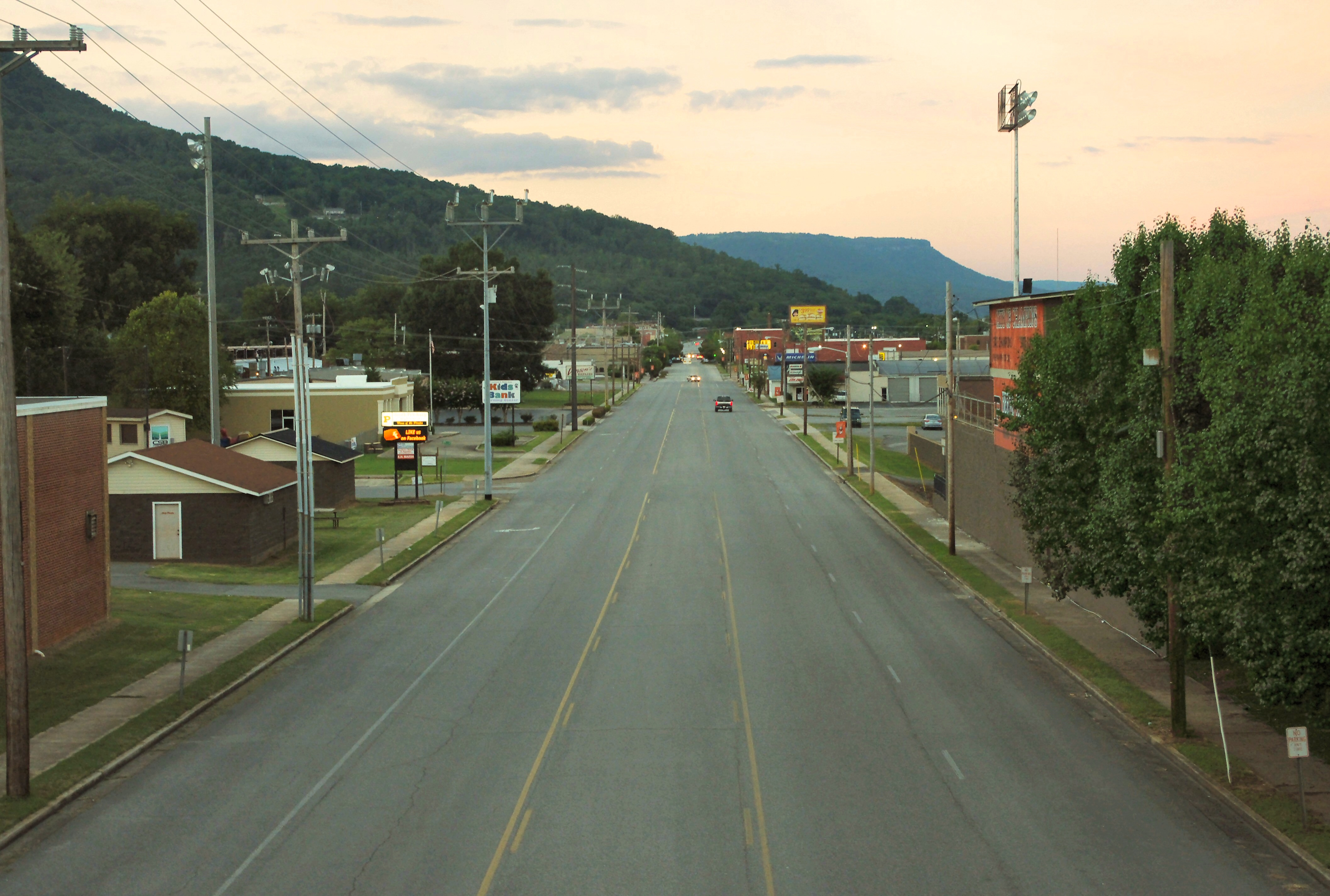
Cedar Avenue (US-72) in South Pittsburg

The city's municipal boundaries stretch southward to the Tennessee-Alabama state line. Kimball borders South Pittsburg to the north, and New Hope lies across the river to the east. Chattanooga is located approximately 25 miles (40 km) to the east.

U.S. Route 72 passes north-to-south through South Pittsburg, connecting the city with Jasper to the north and Bridgeport, Alabama, to the south. Tennessee State Route 156, which crosses the river via the Shelby Reinhart Bridge, connects the city with New Hope and Haletown to the east, and the Sewanee and Monteagle areas atop the Plateau to the west. Interstate 24 passes through Kimball, just north of South Pittsburg.

According to the United States Census Bureau, the city has a total area of 5.9 square miles (15 km^{2}), all land.

== Demographics ==
Historical population
Census	Pop.	Note	%±
1880	1,045		—
1890	1,479		41.5%
1900	1,789		21.0%
1910	2,106		17.7%
1920	2,356		11.9%
1930	2,103		−10.7%
1940	2,285		8.7%
1950	2,573		12.6%
1960	4,130		60.5%
1970	3,613		−12.5%
1980	3,636		0.6%
1990	3,295		−9.4%
2000	3,295		0.0%
2010	2,992		−9.2%
2020	3,106		3.8%

=== 2020 census ===
As of the 2020 census, there were 3,106 people, 1,257 households, and 734 families residing in South Pittsburg. The median age was 41.9 years, with 23.9% of residents under the age of 18 and 19.9% aged 65 or older. For every 100 females there were 84.9 males, and for every 100 females age 18 and over there were 77.8 males.

Of the 1,257 households, 32.2% had children under the age of 18 living in them. Of all households, 34.0% were married-couple households, 17.7% were households with a male householder and no spouse or partner present, and 40.3% were households with a female householder and no spouse or partner present. About 31.6% of all households were made up of individuals and 15.0% had someone living alone who was 65 years of age or older.

There were 1,471 housing units, of which 14.5% were vacant. The homeowner vacancy rate was 1.9% and the rental vacancy rate was 14.0%.

80.4% of residents lived in urban areas, while 19.6% lived in rural areas.

Racial composition as of the 2020 census
Race	Number	Percent
White	2,263	72.9%
Black or African American	574	18.5%
American Indian and Alaska Native	10	0.3%
Asian	37	1.2%
Native Hawaiian and Other Pacific Islander	0	0.0%
Some other race	31	1.0%
Two or more races	191	6.1%
Hispanic or Latino (of any race)	67	2.2%

=== 2000 census ===
As of the census of 2000, there was a population of 3,295, with 1,328 households and 861 families residing in the city. The population density was 556.3 inhabitants per square mile (214.8/km^{2}). There were 1,464 housing units at an average density of 247.2 per square mile (95.4/km^{2}). The racial makeup of the city was 80.64% White, 17.51% African American, 0.12% Native American, 0.27% Asian, 0.27% from other races, and 1.18% from two or more races. Hispanic or Latino of any race were 0.94% of the population.

There were 1,328 households, out of which 28.4% had children under the age of 18 living with them, 43.0% were married couples living together, 17.8% had a female householder with no husband present, and 35.1% were non-families. 32.1% of all households were made up of individuals, and 17.5% had someone living alone who was 65 years of age or older. The average household size was 2.36 and the average family size was 2.97.

In the city, the population was spread out, with 24.0% under the age of 18, 8.1% from 18 to 24, 24.5% from 25 to 44, 23.0% from 45 to 64, and 20.4% who were 65 years of age or older. The median age was 40 years. For every 100 females, there were 84.2 males. For every 100 females age 18 and over, there were 78.8 males.

The median income for a household in the city was $26,000, and the median income for a family was $31,809. Males had a median income of $30,813 versus $20,948 for females. The per capita income for the city was $15,021. About 18.4% of families and 20.9% of the population were below the poverty line, including 30.5% of those under age 18 and 14.6% of those age 65 or over.

== Politics ==
The city government, in 2014, passed a law stating that any persons who work in or associate with the city government in an official capacity are not permitted to make negative comments about the city while using social media. This includes contractors and volunteers. The city commission approved it 4–1.

== Education ==
Marion County Schools includes South Pittsburg High School.

== Notable people ==
- Chris Jones - Former Head Coach, Edmonton Elks, Canadian Football League
- James M. Lewis - pharmacist and Tennessee state senator
- Eddie Moore - NFL linebacker
- Jobyna Ralston - silent film actress

== See also ==
- Lodge (company)
