= Interstate 24 in Tennessee =

Interstate Highway in Tennessee and Georgia, United States

Interstate 24

Route information
- Length: 180.16 mi (Note: The Federal Highway Administration lists the length of I-24 in Tennessee as 180.16 miles (289.94 km), and the combined length in Tennessee and Georgia as 184.26 miles (296.54 km). The Tennessee Department of Transportation considers the combined length in both states to be approximately 185.30 miles (298.21 km).) (289.94 km)
- Existed: August 14, 1957–present
- History: Completed January 5, 1978
- NHS: Entire route

Major junctions
- West end: I-24 at the Kentucky state line near Clarksville
- US 79 in Clarksville; I-65 in Nashville; I-40 in Nashville; I-440 in Nashville; SR 155 in Nashville; I-840 in Murfreesboro; US 64 in Pelham; US 72 in Kimball; I-59 near Wildwood, Georgia; US 27 / I-124 in Chattanooga
- East end: I-75 in Chattanooga

Location
- Country: United States
- States: Tennessee; Georgia

Highway system
- Interstate Highway System; Main; Auxiliary; Suffixed; Business; Future
- Tennessee State Routes; Interstate; US; State
- Georgia State Highway System; Interstate; US; State; Special
← SR 23	TN	→ SR 24
← SR 23	GA	→ SR 24
← SR 408	GA SR 409	→ SR 410

Interstate 24 (I-24) is part of the Interstate Highway System that runs 316.36 miles (509.13 km) in the Southeastern and Midwestern United States. In Tennessee, the Interstate enters the state in Clarksville, the state's fifth-largest city; passes through Nashville, the state capital and largest city; and reaches its eastern terminus in Chattanooga, the fourth-largest city. I-24 also passes through Murfreesboro, the sixth-largest city and largest suburb in Tennessee, and anchors the most populous urbanized corridor in the state. I-24 serves two major military installations: Fort Campbell in Clarksville and Arnold Air Force Base near Tullahoma. At 180.16 miles (289.94 km), more of I-24 is in Tennessee than the other three states combined. The Tennessee segment is also divided by a 4.10-mile-long (6.60 km) section west of Chattanooga that dips into Georgia. Through Georgia, I-24 carries an unsigned State Route 409 (SR 409) designation for Georgia Department of Transportation (GDOT) internal departmental purposes.

While officially an east-west Interstate, I-24 runs in a northwest–to–southeast alignment. It has one auxiliary route, I-124 in Chattanooga, which is unsigned. It crosses several of Tennessee's physiographic regions—the Highland Rim and Nashville Basin in Middle Tennessee, and the Cumberland Plateau and Ridge-and-Valley Appalachians in East Tennessee. Much of I-24's route in Tennessee is mountainous and hilly. The section through the Cumberland Plateau includes Monteagle Mountain, which has some of the steepest grades on any Interstate Highway, and a deep mountain gorge with sharp curves. Steep grades are also in the northwestern part. I-24 roughly follows the older U.S. Route 41 (US 41) corridor, which evolved from the Dixie Highway and earlier trails.

When the Interstate Highway System was established in 1956, the road that became I-24 was authorized between Nashville and Chattanooga. Proposals for a western extension arose shortly thereafter to improve connectivity between the Southeast and St. Louis. After many years of debate, an agreement was reached for the alignment in 1963, which was approved the following year. The original portion of I-24 through Tennessee was completed in 1971, and the extension was finished in 1978. Since then, rapid urban growth has necessitated various improvement projects. I-24 between Nashville and Chattanooga is also a major trucking corridor, owing to Tennessee's central location. Heavy truck traffic, combined with the terrain, exacerbates congestion on much of the route. Stretches in Nashville and Chattanooga routinely experience severe congestion, with the section between Nashville and Murfreesboro widely considered the most gridlocked highway in the state. The I-24 Southeast Choice Lanes, the first express toll lanes in Tennessee, are planned on this section. Despite improvements, congestion problems persist elsewhere on I-24, and the state has been accused of neglecting some of them.

== Route description ==
I-24 is maintained by the Tennessee Department of Transportation (TDOT), along with all Interstate, U.S., and state routes. In 2025, annual average daily traffic counts ranged from 33,037 vehicles between SR 2 in rural Marion County and US 72 in Kimball to 188,694 vehicles on the concurrency with I-65 in Nashville, which was the highest traffic volume on any road in Tennessee. The stretch of I-24 in Tennessee accounts for about 57% of the freeway's total length, and is the state's second-longest Interstate Highway behind I-40. Much of I-24 in Tennessee is a major freight corridor, particularly between Nashville and Chattanooga. Most of the urban parts of I-24, including from downtown Nashville to near Smyrna, and through Chattanooga, experience severe congestion during rush hour. Several points consistently rank among the worst bottlenecks in the country, particularly for truck traffic. Many of the rural and suburban segments, particularly between Clarksville and Nashville, are also widely considered to be well over capacity and suffer from periodic congestion and a high crash rate. I-24 is often cited as the most hated or loathed road in Tennessee.

=== Clarksville and Western Highland Rim ===
I-24 in Clarksville near the Kentucky state line.

I-24 crosses into Tennessee from Kentucky, traveling in a southeast-to-northwest path into Montgomery County and serving as a major means of access to St. Louis and Chicago to the northwest. Immediately within the eastern outskirts of Clarksville, the fifth-largest city in Tennessee, the Interstate reaches an interchange with State Route 48 (SR 48), less than one mile (1.6 km) later, which provides access to Trenton in Kentucky to the north. About three miles (4.8 km) later, the Interstate reaches US 79, which also provides access to Guthrie and Russellville in Kentucky to the northeast, and traffic begins to rapidly increase. Bypassing Clarksville to the east, the Interstate next reaches SR 237. The highway then begins a steep descent, with the westbound lanes utilizing a truck climbing lane to ascend the grade from the east. It then crosses the Red River before reaching SR 76.

Leaving Clarksville, the highway enters a long straight section with several steep grades and crosses into Robertson County a short distance later. Several miles later, the Interstate reaches an interchange with SR 49 near Pleasant View and Coopertown, which provides access to Springfield to the northeast and Ashland City to the southwest. The route then descends, utilizing another westbound truck lane, before briefly entering Cheatham County. The Interstate then crosses another steep hill over the next several miles, utilizing an eastbound truck lane before crossing into Davidson County. It then has an interchange with US 431 near the Joelton community and begins a gradual descent into the Nashville Basin, containing a westbound truck lane. Passing over the next few miles through dense woodlands, the highway reaches SR 45 (Old Hickory Boulevard) about five miles (8.0 km) later. Over the next three miles (4.8 km) beyond this point, the Interstate crosses over another steep hill, utilizing truck lanes on both the eastbound and westbound ascents before reaching Nashville at SR 155 (Briley Parkway).

=== Nashville metropolitan area ===
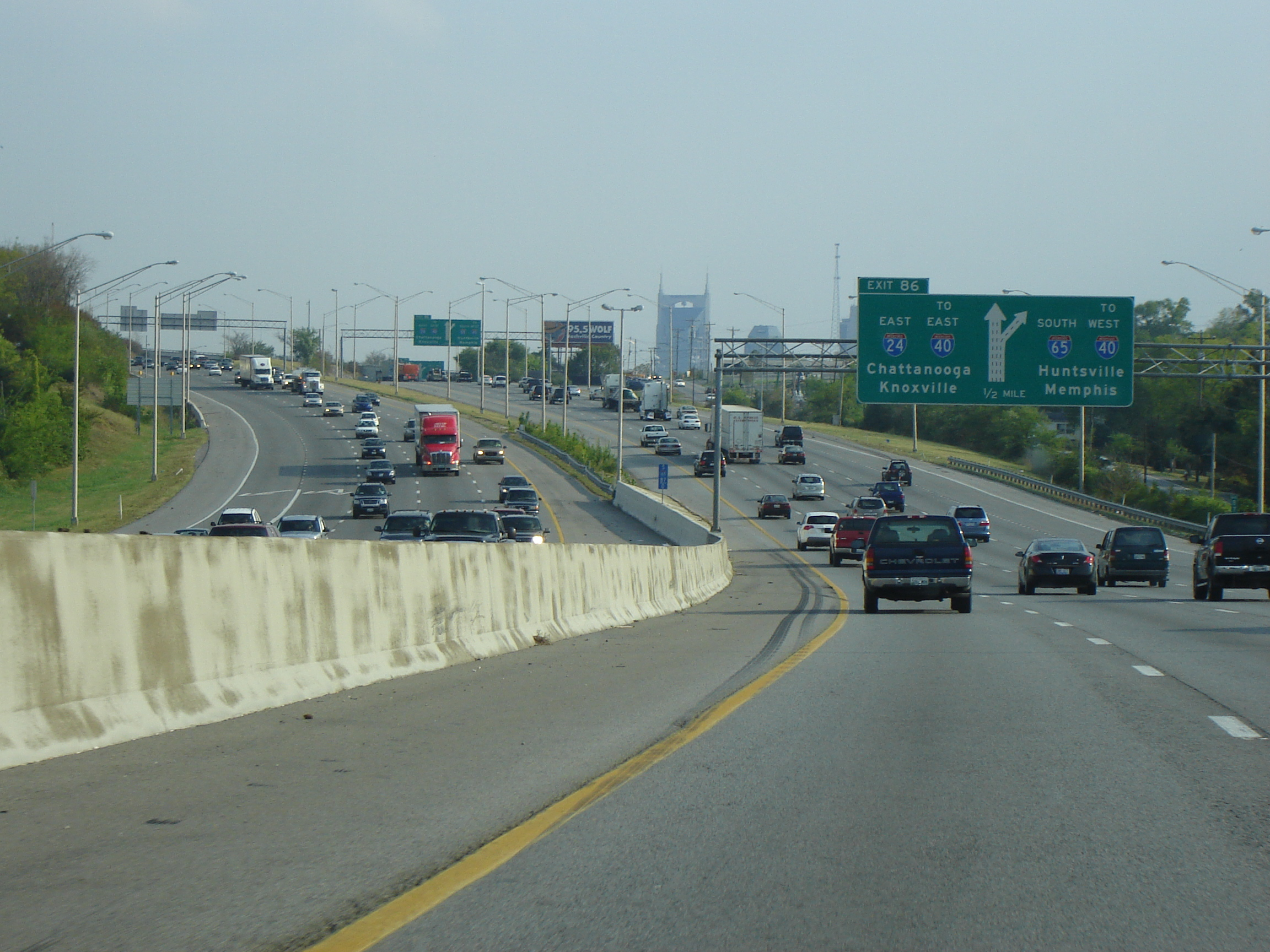
I-24 eastbound in Nashville concurrent with I-65

Entering Nashville, I-24 has a cloverleaf interchange with SR 155 (Briley Parkway), a northern controlled-access beltway around Nashville. Less than one mile (1.6 km) later, the Interstate joins a concurrency with I-65, where the combined routes carry eight throughlanes and travel due south. About one mile (1.6 km) later is an interchange with US 41A/US 431 (Trinity Lane). About one mile (1.6 km) beyond this point, I-65 splits off and I-24 passes along the east side of downtown Nashville, where it reduces to six lanes and has interchanges with US 41, US 431, and US 31E, and passes near Nissan Stadium. The interstate then crosses the Cumberland River on the Silliman Evans Bridge and joins in a concurrency with I-40, traveling southeast-to-northwest with eight throughlanes. Two miles (3.2 km) later, I-40 splits off eastwardly, heading toward Knoxville. Located at this interchange is also a partial interchange with US 41/US 70S (Murfreesboro Road).

Less than one mile (1.6 km) later is an interchange with the eastern terminus of I-440, which is also accessible from I-40 nearby. Between I-40 and I-440, I-24's eastbound lanes are split into two barrier-separated carriageways to prevent weaving of traffic destined from I-40 to I-440. A short distance later is once again an interchange with SR 155 (Briley Parkway/Thompson Lane) near Nashville International Airport. Beginning at the next exit, SR 255 (Harding Place), the left lanes operate as high-occupancy vehicle (HOV) lanes during rush hour. Over the next few miles, I-24 passes through the Antioch neighborhood, where it has interchanges with Haywood Lane and SR 254 (Bell Road), and crosses Mill Creek. I-24 then continues through southeast Nashville, reaching interchanges with Hickory Hollow Parkway and SR 171 (Old Hickory Boulevard).

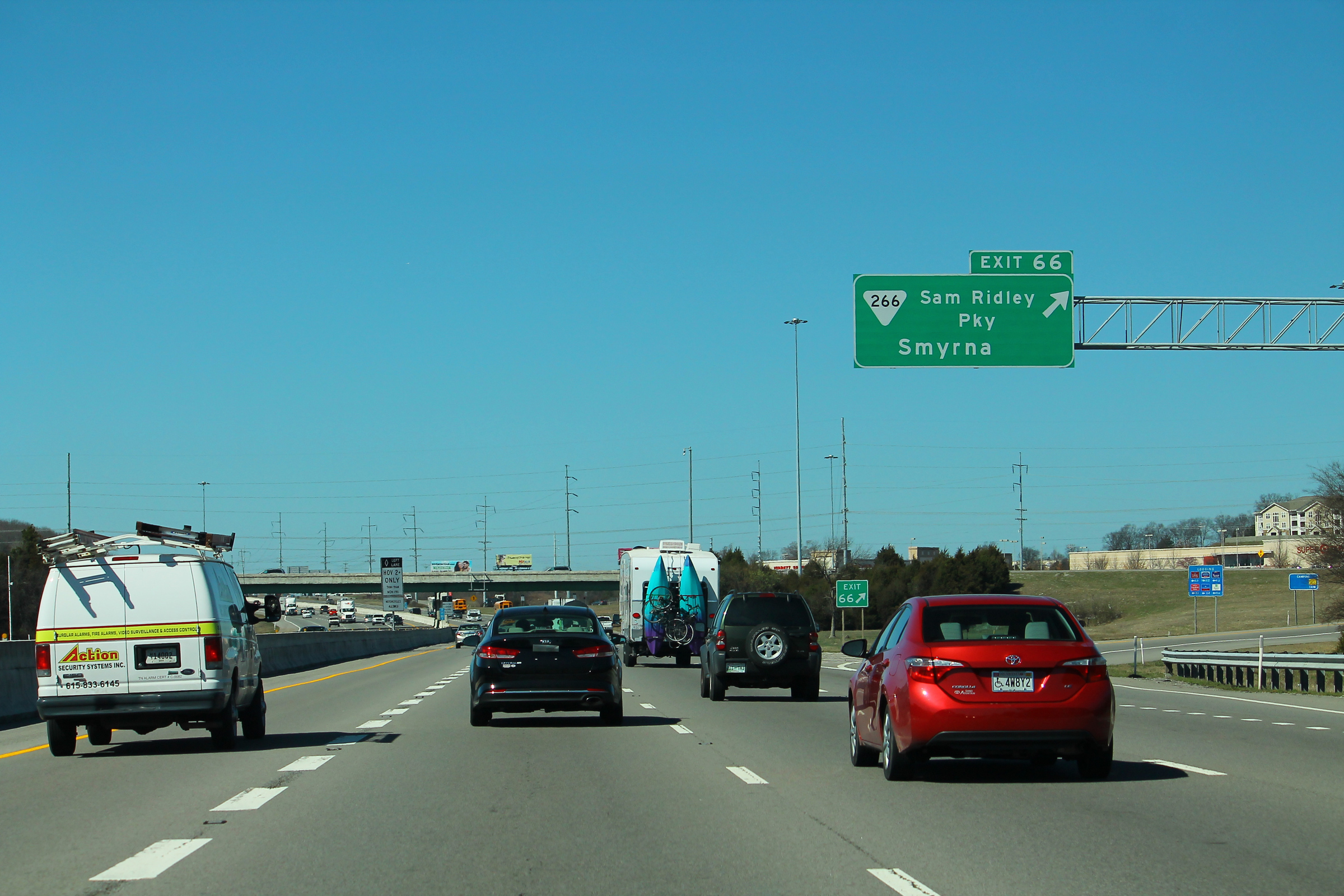
I-24 westbound in Smyrna, a suburb of Nashville

Continuing through the southeastern suburbs of Nashville, I-24 crosses into Rutherford County about two miles (3.2 km) beyond. Immediately within the city of La Vergne, the Interstate has an exit with a connector road to that city. It then enters Smyrna where it first has an interchange with SR 266 (Sam Ridley Pkwy.). The Interstate then enters a long straightaway and reaches an interchange with SR 102 (Almaville Road), which also serves Smyrna and the Nissan Smyrna Assembly Plant. Leaving Smyrna, the route enters an unincorporated urban area before reaching a three-level interchange with I-840, the outer southern beltway around Nashville. I-24 then enters Murfreesboro, the largest suburb of Nashville and sixth-largest city in Tennessee. The Interstate first has an interchange with a local thoroughfare (Medical Center Parkway/Fortress Blvd), before reaching SR 96, which also connects to Franklin. A short distance later, the Interstate crosses the west fork of the Stones River and reaches SR 99 (New Salem Highway). A short distance later, the highway reaches US 231, which also connects to Lebanon and Shelbyville. Here, the HOV lane restriction terminates, and the Interstate reduces from eight to four lanes. Leaving Murfreesboro, the Interstate has an interchange three miles (4.8 km) later with the Joe B. Jackson Parkway, which serves as an outer beltway around southeast Murfreesboro.

=== Eastern Nashville Basin and Eastern Highland Rim ===
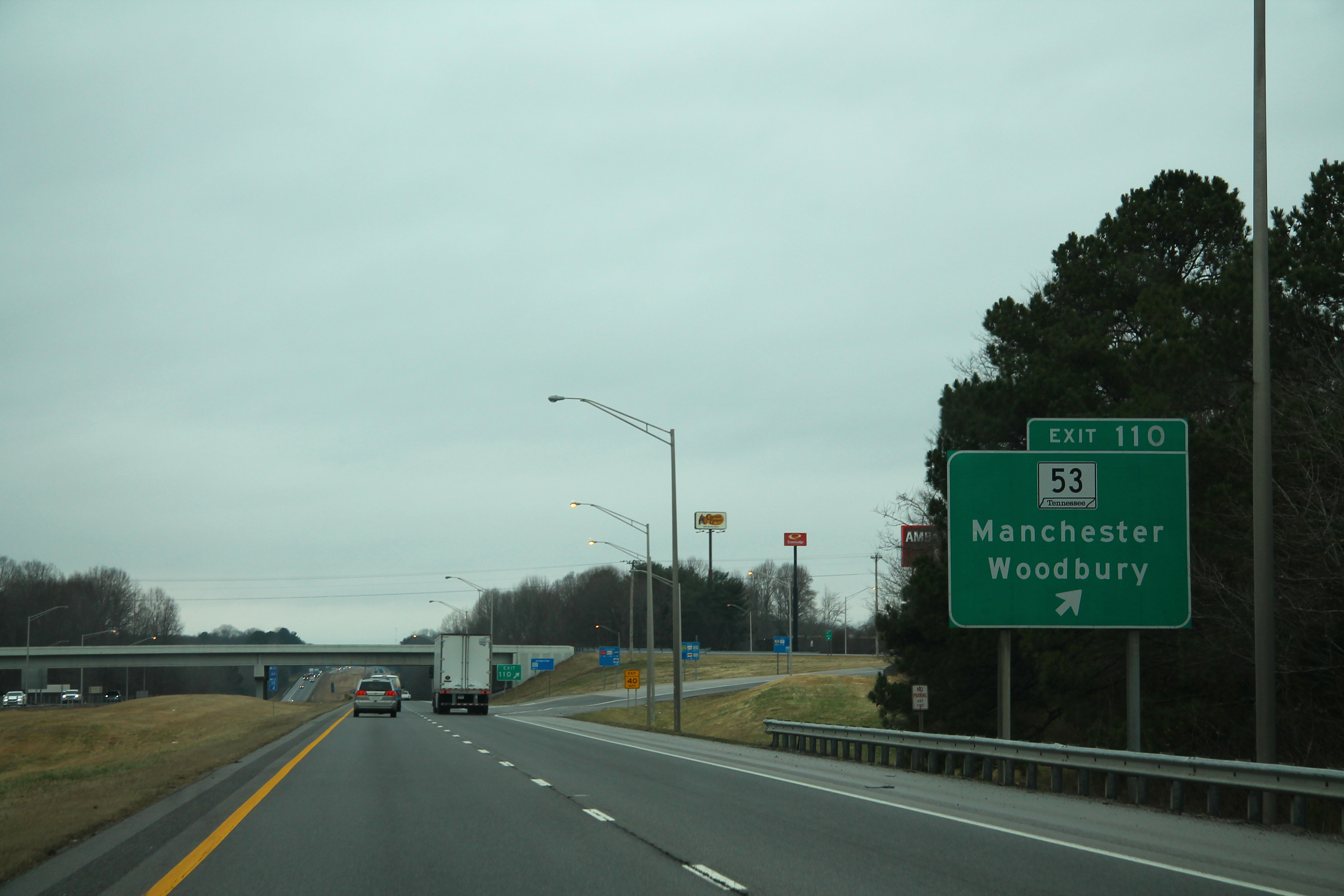
I-24 westbound in Manchester

Upon leaving Murfreesboro, I-24 enters a rural area, passing through a mix of farmland and woodlands and maintaining a straight alignment. Several miles later, the Interstate begins a gradual, largely unnoticeable, ascent out of the Nashville Basin onto the eastern Highland Rim. A few miles later, the Interstate briefly enters Bedford County and then has an interchange with SR 64, which connects to Shelbyville, near the Bedford–Coffee county line. I-24 then briefly descends, curves to the south, then the east, before once again resuming its gradual ascent, where it surpasses an elevation of 1,000 feet (300 m) for the first time in Tennessee. Upon reaching the top of the rim several miles later, the interstate has an interchange with US 41. Five miles (8.0 km) later, the highway enters Manchester, where it crosses the Little Duck River and then has interchanges with SR 53 and SR 55 in short proximity. A short distance later, the highway reaches an interchange with US 41 once again. Leaving Manchester, the Interstate maintains its relatively straight trajectory and passes through the northeastern corner of Arnold Air Force Base over a distance of about three miles (4.8 km). The Interstate then travels over the next 10 miles (16 km) through a wide swath of mostly farmland, before entering Grundy County and reaching an interchange with US 64 and SR 50 near the town of Pelham, where it begins a concurrency with the former route that is largely unsigned. A short distance later, I-24 crosses the Elk River, before reaching the base of the Cumberland Plateau.

=== Monteagle Mountain and Cumberland Plateau gorge ===
I-24 westbound ascending the Cumberland Plateau near Monteagle.

One of the most hazardous stretches of Interstate Highway in the US is located where I-24 crosses the Cumberland Plateau on steep grades near the town of Monteagle, commonly known as "Monteagle Mountain" or "Monteagle". While all motorists are advised to exercise caution along this stretch, truckers are particularly vexed by Monteagle, and many have died in accidents along this stretch. Throughout the entire stretch across the plateau, the speed limit reduces to a maximum of 55 mph (89 km/h) and 45 mph (72 km/h) for trucks on both downgrades; truckers are advised to slow to between 35 and 25 miles per hour (56 and 40 km/h) on the descents depending on their weight. The western grade ascends 778 feet (237 m) over 4.5 miles (7.2 km), with a 5% grade. While not considered as hazardous as the eastbound descent, the westbound descent contains many curves, including one "c-shaped" curve, protracted over a distance of almost one mile (1.6 km). The eastbound and westbound lanes are also located very close together, and crossover crashes and collisions with Jersey barriers in the median in some places are common on this stretch. This segment also features off-ramp approach-style lane dividers to slow traffic. At the top of the plateau, the Interstate reaches 1,905 feet (581 m) in elevation, has interchanges with US 41A and US 41, respectively, and crosses into East Tennessee at the Grundy–Marion county line. I-24 then begins its steep descent down the plateau, with the eastbound and westbound lanes diverging and following separate natural valleys along the escarpment.

The eastbound grade is even more hazardous. On this stretch, I-24 is three lanes in each direction, with the extra westbound lane serving as a truck-climbing lane, and the third eastbound lane acting as an extra lane to pass slow trucks. A truck inspection station is located at the top of this descent in the eastbound lanes. The eastbound lanes contain a 6% grade over a length of about 4.5 miles (7.2 km), which is one of the steepest slopes on the Interstate system. Along this section, the elevation drops 1,161 feet (354 m), and two runaway truck ramps, are provided, which are on the left due to the terrain. The speed limit reduces to 55 miles per hour (89 km/h) and 45 miles per hour (72 km/h) for trucks in the eastbound lanes. The westbound lanes contain several sharp curves and are located in deep rock cuts prone to rockfall. The median on the eastern Monteagle grade is also more than one mile (1.6 km) wide at one point, making it one of the widest medians of any Interstate Highway. The dangerous eastbound Monteagle descent was the inspiration for a song in the 1977 film Smokey and the Bandit, and a 1986 Johnny Cash song, "Chattanooga City Limit Sign".

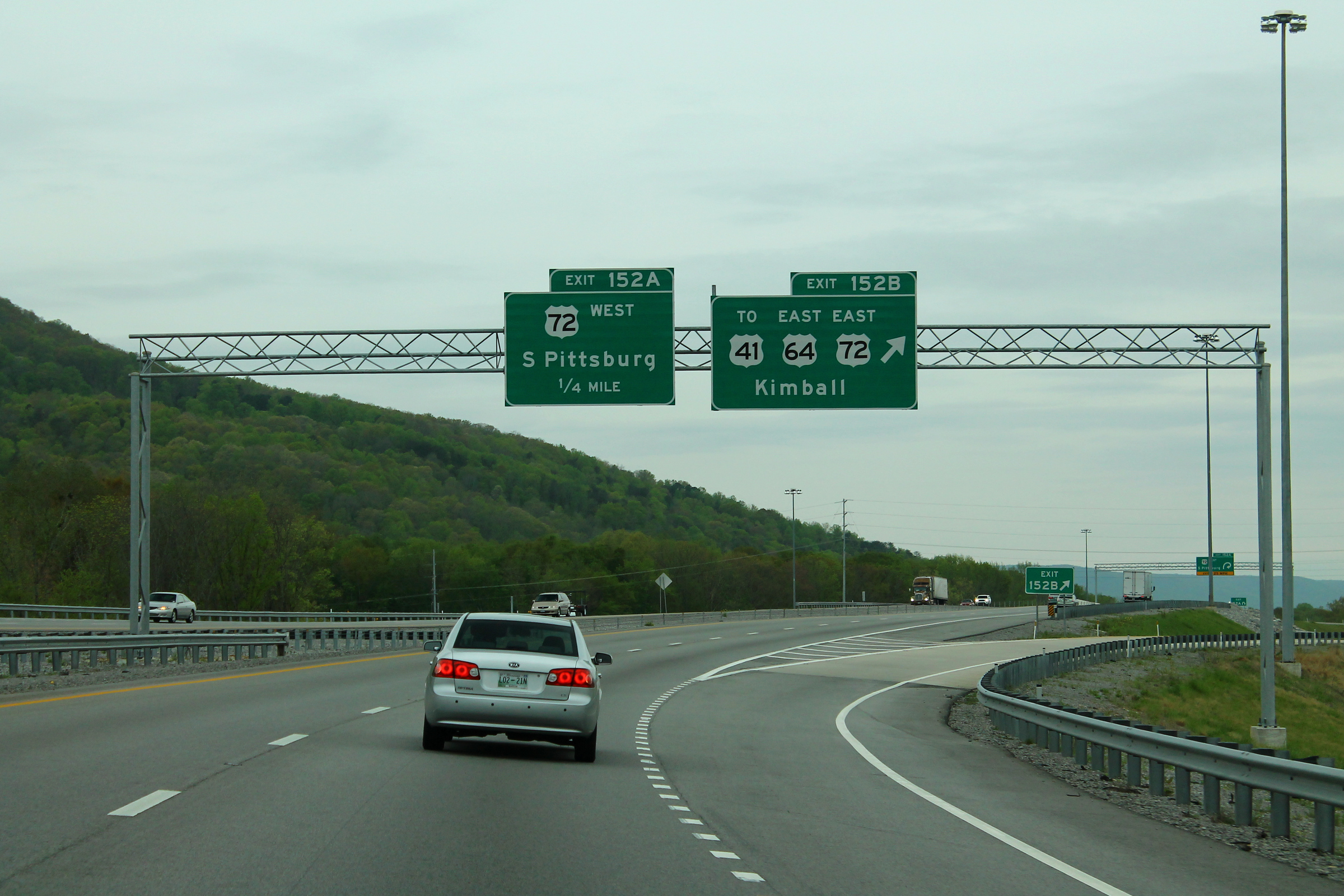
Westbound I-24 at the US 72 interchange in Kimball

After descending Monteagle, I-24 reduces to four lanes and travels for several miles through a vast flat gorge within the plateau characterized by long straightaways and few curves. Along this stretch, it has an interchange with SR 5. Several miles later, it reaches an interchange with US 72 in Kimball and near South Pittsburg, where US 64 splits off. This exit is the primary means of access to Huntsville, Alabama, for motorists in East Tennessee. About three miles (4.8 km) later, the Interstate has an interchange with SR 28 in Jasper and crosses the Sequatchie River. Beyond this point, the east and westbound lanes split more than one-half mile (800 m) apart over a few miles, encompassing farms, homes, and a few businesses in between. The route then crosses a large mountain ridge, has an interchange with SR 27, and, about one mile (1.6 km) later, crosses the Nickajack Lake impoundment of the Tennessee River on the Holman J. Walker Bridge. Beyond this point, the highway meanders through a narrow gorge over several miles, crossing Running Water Creek and traveling under its namesake trestle. This stretch is extremely crooked and can experience strong crosswinds. The Interstate then enters Hamilton County, also transitioning from Central Time to Eastern Time Zone, and then crosses into Georgia less than one-quarter mile (400 m) later.

=== Georgia and Chattanooga ===
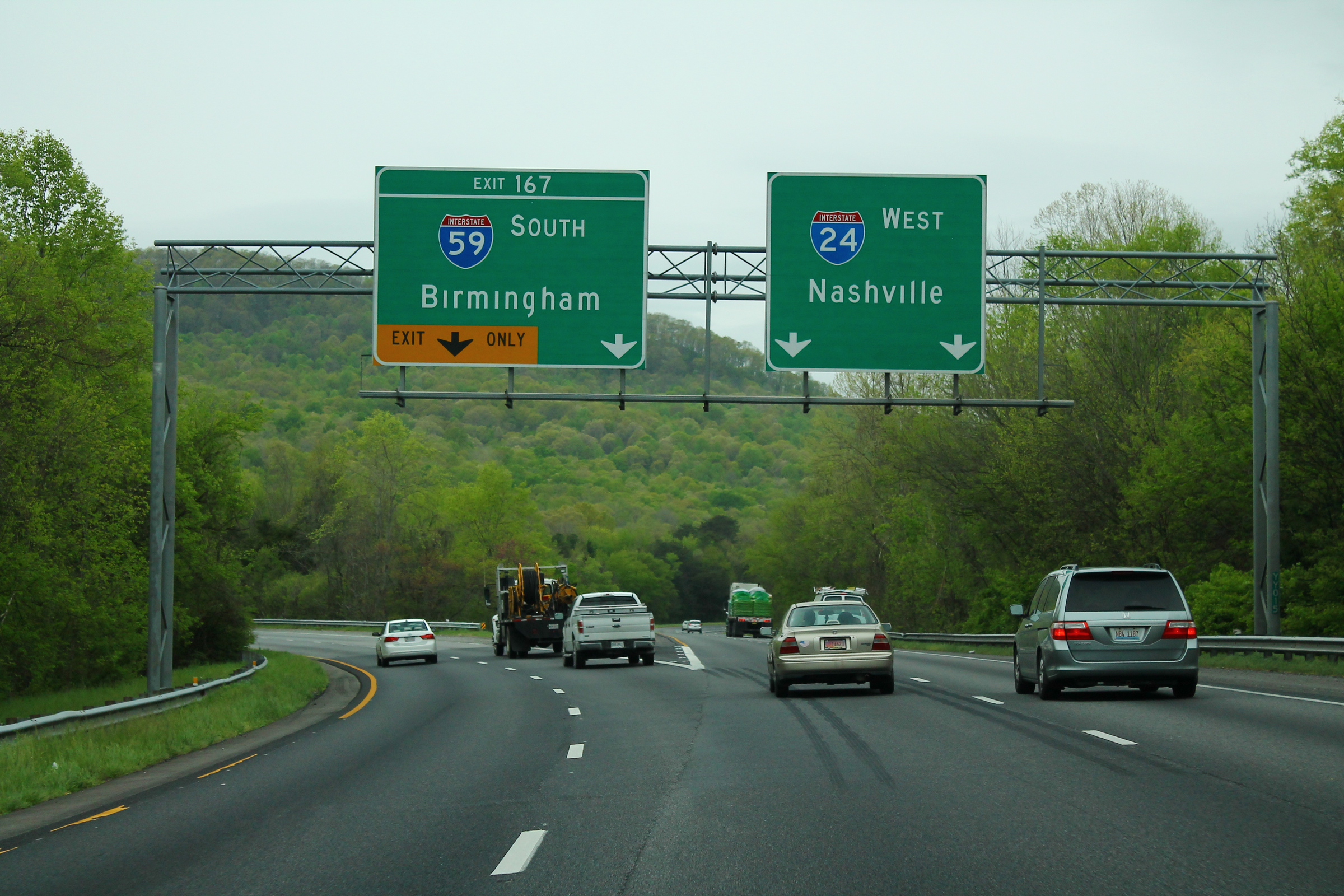
Westbound I-24 in northwest Georgia at the interchange with I-59

In the state of Georgia, I-24 travels in Dade County in the state's northwest corner for 4.1 miles (6.6 km), making it the shortest Interstate Highway in Georgia. It runs along the southern flank of Raccoon Mountain. Along this stretch, exits remain numbered according to the combined Tennessee and Georgia mileage; however, the roadway mileposts are numbered according to Georgia's mileage. Maintained by the Georgia Department of Transportation (GDOT), this segment also carries the unsigned SR 409 designation for internal departmental purposes. About 1.5 miles (2.4 km) after entering the state, the Interstate has a wye interchange with the northern terminus of I-59, which provides access to Birmingham, Alabama, to the southwest. The route then shifts northeast and has an interchange with SR 299 in Wildwood about one mile (1.6 km) later before turning north and reentering Tennessee and Hamilton County about 3/4 mile (1.2 km) later.

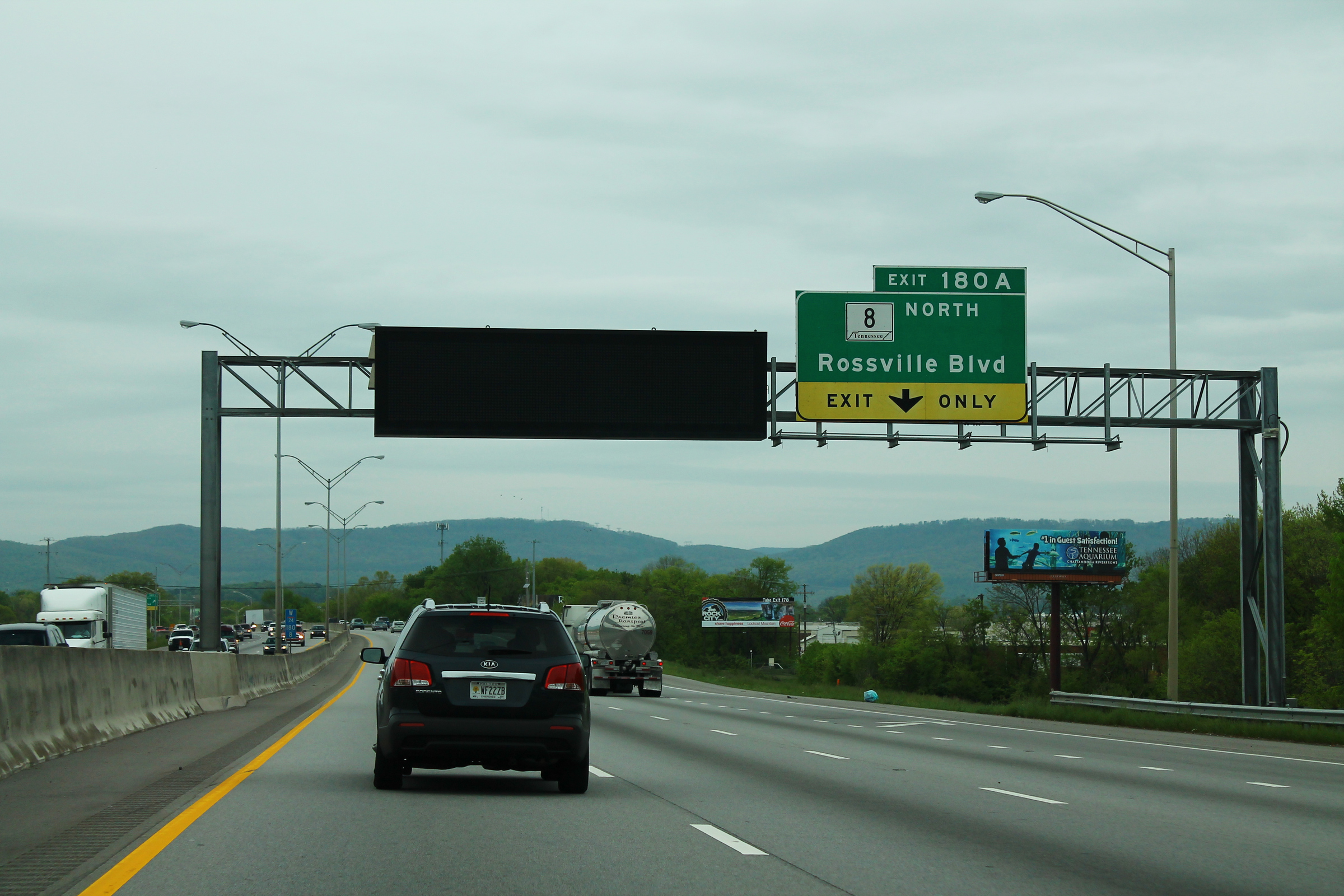
I-24 eastbound in Chattanooga concurrent with US 27

I-24 travels through the Tiftonia neighborhood of Chattanooga and Lookout Valley for several miles and has an interchange with US 41/64 (Cummings Highway) about three miles (4.8 km) later, which provides access to US 11 nearby. About two miles (3.2 km) later, the Interstate curves sharply to the east, traveling on a narrow artificial causeway between the Tennessee River to the north and the northern tip of Lookout Mountain to the south. A short distance later, the Interstate gradually curves 90 degrees to the north, entering downtown Chattanooga. Less than one mile (1.6 km) later is a three-way semi-directional T interchange with US 27 (unsigned I-124 northbound) northbound, which provides access to downtown Chattanooga directly to the north. Forming an unsigned concurrency with US 27, the highways sharply curve 90 degrees to the east and pass through an interchange complex known in the past as the "Big Scramble" that includes partial access to US 11/41/64 (Broad Street), SR 58 (Market Street), and a westbound collector-distributor facility that provides access to US 27. I-24 then widens to eight lanes, and briefly dips to the south, where it has a trumpet interchange with a connector to SR 8. A short distance later, US 27 splits off to the south at a near-cloverleaf interchange as Rossville Boulevard, where the Interstate curves sharply again and reduces to six lanes. It then travels through the south side of Chattanooga before reaching a partial interchange with US 41/US 76. Here, I-24 reaches the "Ridge Cut", a short stretch where the Interstate ascends Missionary Ridge on a steep grade, first curving sharply to the north at the bottom of the ascent and then to the east again at the top. This stretch is especially hazardous to truckers, and motorists are advised to slow to 40 miles per hour (64 km/h) in the eastbound lanes at the bottom curve. At the top of the Ridge Cut, the Interstate enters a straight section and begins a gradual descent over a short distance. Traveling roughly along the boundary between Chattanooga and East Ridge, the Interstate has interchanges with multiple local thoroughfares over the next few miles. It then reaches its eastern terminus with I-75 at a semi-directional T interchange, known locally as the "75/24 Split" or simply "The Split".

== Honorary designations ==
Several sections, bridges, and interchanges on I-24 in Tennessee are named for law enforcement officers killed in the line of duty. The section between Fourth Avenue and Crest Drive in Chattanooga was named "Officer Julie Jacks Memorial Highway" in October 2008 after a Chattanooga Police Department officer killed in 2002. The section in Chattanooga between mile markers 179 and 180 was named "The Impressions Highway" in a dedication ceremony on September 11, 2010, after The Impressions, a music group from Chattanooga. The Silliman Evans Bridge in Nashville is named after a long-time publisher of The Nashville Tennessean.

== History ==
=== Predecessor highways ===
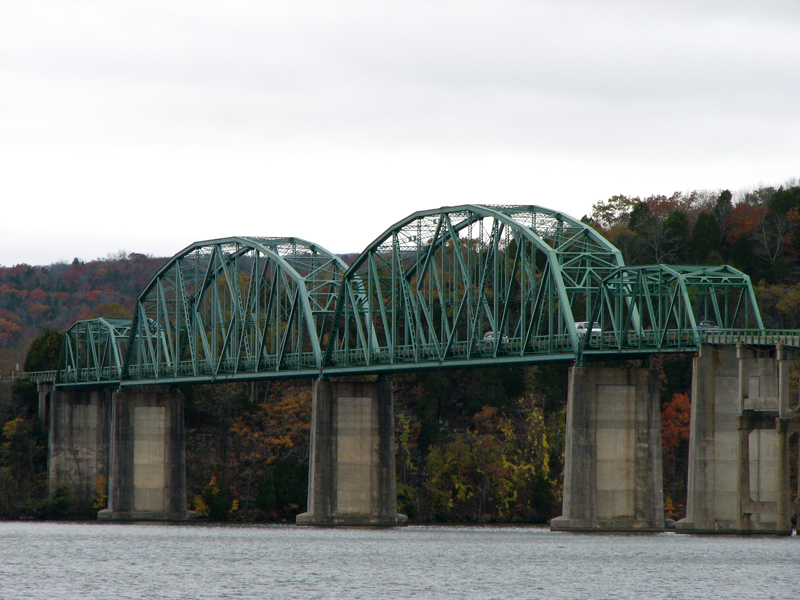
The former Marion Memorial Bridge crossed the Tennessee River on the Dixie Highway, which was once the main road between Nashville and Chattanooga.

Prior to settlement by European Americans, a series of Native American trails existed in the vicinity where I-24 is now located. These were extensively utilized by settlers and traders in the late 18th and earlier 19th centuries, and evolved into a system of turnpikes and stagecoach paths. Several ferries were also established at major river crossings. During the Cherokee removal in 1838, this area was used for part of the Northern Route of the Trail of Tears. This corridor became even more important with the advent of railroads in the mid-19th century. During the American Civil War, the network of trails and railroads between Clarksville and Chattanooga became one of the most important overland supply corridors between the North and South, and was one of the most fought-over regions. Several of the war's largest engagements, including the battles of Fort Henry, Fort Donelson, Stones River, Nashville, and the Tullahoma and Chattanooga campaigns, occurred along this route.

By the early 20th century, the last tolls were removed from paths in Tennessee. In 1915, part of the road network between Nashville and Chattanooga was established as part of the Dixie Highway, a network of auto trails. In the 1920s, Tennessee was known as a "detour state" because of its poor road conditions, particularly in mountainous areas. A new road was built across the Cumberland Plateau at Monteagle Mountain in 1923. A restaurant along this road was used by crime boss Al Capone as his halfway stopover between Chicago and Miami during Prohibition. Also in 1923, Tennessee established its numbered state route system. In 1926, the U.S. Highway System was established, and the road between the Kentucky state line northeast of Clarksville and Chattanooga was designated US 41. Another paralleling route running between Clarksville and Monteagle was designated US 41A in 1944.

=== Planning ===
==== Initial planning ====
The highway that is now I-24 had its origins in the late 1930s, when the federal government began planning for a national "superhighway" system. A 1939 report titled Toll Roads and Free Roads and published by the Bureau of Public Roads (BPR), the predecessor agency to the Federal Highway Administration (FHWA), recommended a controlled-access highway connect Nashville and Chattanooga. This was affirmed by the National Interregional Highway Committee's 1944 report, titled Interregional Highways, and a subsequent 1947 plan produced by the Public Roads Administration of the now-defunct Federal Works Agency. When the Interstate Highway System was created by the Federal-Aid Highway Act of 1956, the freeway between Nashville and Chattanooga was part of 1,047.6 miles (1,685.9 km) of Interstate Highways allocated to Tennessee. The numbering was approved by the American Association of State Highway Officials on August 14, 1957.

The mountainous terrain of the Cumberland Plateau region posed complications to engineers just as it had hindered road-building efforts in the past. At Monteagle Mountain, the old US 41/64 highway on the eastern escarpment would be converted to the eastbound lanes of I-24, and a new road would be built for the westbound lanes along another valley to the north. This resulted in this stretch of I-24 having one of the widest medians of any highway. Initial concepts had the Interstate on a more direct alignment between Nashville and Chattanooga entirely in Tennessee. By January 1957, Tennessee and Georgia highway officials reached an agreement for I-24 to briefly dip into Georgia along a natural valley south of Raccoon Mountain before traversing a deep and curvy creek gorge through the Cumberland Plateau to the west. This decision was made because of the mountainous terrain in the area and geological challenges associated with upgrading the old US 41/64 route through the Tennessee River Gorge, which was prone to landslides.

The stretch through Chattanooga also provided many engineering challenges as well. West of downtown, I-24 was proposed to cross the Tennessee River onto Moccasin Bend, before crossing the river again into Lookout Valley. In 1957, an engineering firm suggested the freeway cross the bend's ankle, and an adjacent canal and system of dams be constructed to divert the river north of the freeway. In April 1958, the BPR rejected this proposal as too expensive. In November 1959, planners made a final decision to instead route the Interstate between the river and the foot of Lookout Mountain, which had been recommended by another firm in 1956. This required an artificial fill on the river's south bank, which would be dredged from the north bank to avoid altering the river's flow. While this option made this section one of the most complex and costly in Tennessee, it was ultimately estimated to be less expensive than bridging the river twice. A tunnel was initially considered for the Missionary Ridge crossing. In October 1960, this was revised in favor of a cut through the ridge measuring 120 feet (37 m) deep and 850 feet (260 m) wide. This faced opposition from area residents and historic preservationists, since it was built through part of the site of the Battle of Missionary Ridge. In response, engineers included two bridges spanning the cut to connect the divided neighborhoods.

==== Western extension ====
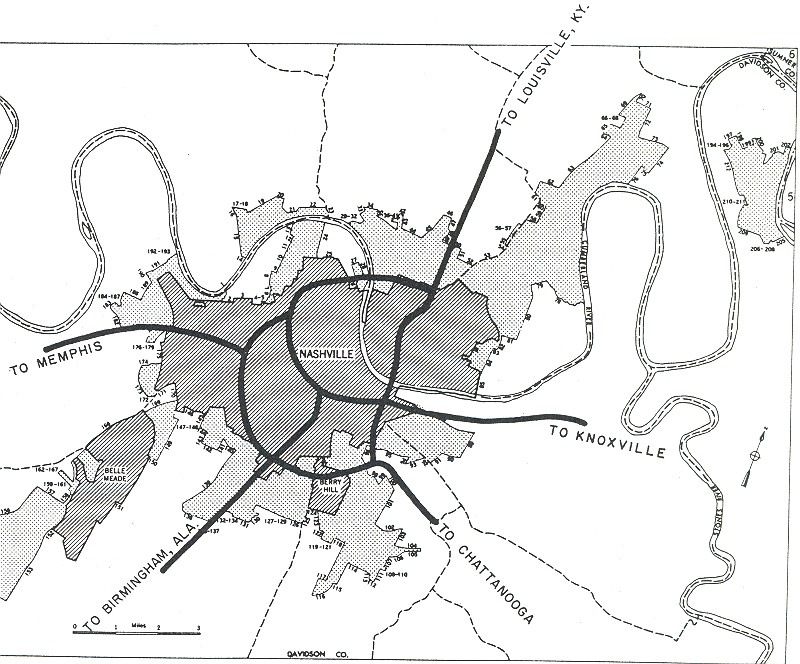
1955 Bureau of Public Roads highway plan for Nashville, showing the highway that became I-24 terminating there

While I-24 was initially slated to terminate in Nashville, the states of Tennessee, Kentucky, Missouri, and Illinois sought to improve connectivity between St. Louis and Nashville, as well as between the larger Upper Mississippi area and the Southeast. In 1957, they began exploring the possibility of extending I-24 to St. Louis. The first major proposal, which was included in a list of potential additions to the Interstate Highway System on October 18, 1957, would extend I-24 to I-57 in Cairo, Illinois, but wasn't approved since an alignment hadn't been determined yet. In December 1957, the highway departments of Tennessee, Kentucky, and Illinois met for the first time regarding the matter. They developed a concept for I-24 to run concurrently with I-40 for approximately 40 miles (64 km) west of Nashville, before splitting off to the northwest near Dickson, crossing the Kentucky Lake reservoir of the Tennessee River near Paris Landing State Park, and entering Kentucky a short distance beyond. On December 20, 1957, they transmitted a letter to the Kentucky District Engineer at the BPR, detailing their proposal for an extension of I-24 between Dickson and near Marion, Illinois, which generally followed this route, and crossed the Ohio River near Paducah, Kentucky. Next, they submitted a request to the BPR for approval on January 15, 1958. However, the BPR did not act on this request, and still favored the Cairo terminus. Nevertheless, this proposal was endorsed by Governor Buford Ellington in 1959 and initially supported by officials in western Kentucky.

In late 1958, a proposal to the east arose in Kentucky that would connect Clarksville to Nashville. This "straight-line" route would connect Nashville directly to St. Louis, and was proposed by a delegation of representatives from cities along the route, who argued that it would be more cost effective and provide access to Fort Campbell. In February 1960, Tennessee withdrew from the 1958 agreement with Kentucky and Illinois to study additional routes, although this wasn't made public until June 1961. At an AASHO meeting in Detroit on November 14, 1960, Tennessee highway officials revealed that they now favored an alignment near Clarksville and Fort Campbell, and sentiment also began to shift towards such a route amongst Kentucky and BPR officials around this time. The federal government began to support an eastern alignment because of its proximity to Fort Campbell, and still favored an Ohio River crossing near Cairo, Illinois. Disagreements disagreements over the final route between the four states and BPR officials delayed its adoption and approval. In addition to controversies over the Tennessee, Kentucky, and Illinois segments, there were also debates about whether I-24 should continue to St. Louis or provide access to St. Louis by means of an existing Interstate. Further stymieing consensus was another proposed Interstate Highway, which was at one point unofficially dubbed I-24W, between I-55 near Hayti, Missouri, and I-40 in Jackson, Tennessee. This would incorporate a Mississippi River bridge between the two states near Caruthersville, Missouri, proposed since the 1930s. By 1963, two major alignments in Tennessee incorporating previous proposals were under consideration: the western alignment from 1957 and the Nashville-to-Clarksville alignment from 1960.

A map produced by The Nashville Tennessean in 1963 showing some of the proposed routes for the extension.

On September 17, 1963, the governors of the four states, in a meeting with President John F. Kennedy, U.S. Secretary of Commerce Luther H. Hodges, and BPR Administrator Rex Marion Whitton, reached a compromise on the alignment for I-24's extension. Under this agreement, I-24 would run between Nashville and Clarksville. In addition, it would not continue all the way to St. Louis, instead terminating with I-57 in Pulleys Mill, Illinois, as was proposed in the 1957 agreement. Missouri Governor John M. Dalton pledged not to support this alignment if the BPR would not agree to the Caruthersville Bridge, however. This alignment also remained controversial in Kentucky. On August 18, 1964, the BPR approved the extension between Nashville and Pulleys Mill, establishing I-24 west of Nashville for the first time. They also authorized the westernmost portion of the other Interstate Highway between Missouri and Tennessee, which they designated I-155, but did not approve the entire route to Jackson. On November 22, 1966, the state forwarded a request by the city of Springfield to the BPR to shift the alignment closer to the city, but this was denied two months later.

=== Construction ===
The first section of I-24 to be completed was the section in Chattanooga between SR 58 (Market Street) and east of the railyard overpass, which was let to contract on September 18, 1957, and dedicated and opened by Chattanooga mayor P. R. Olgiati on December 23, 1958. This was the first section of freeway in Chattanooga and the first section of Interstate in East Tennessee constructed under the Interstate Highway System. The interchange with I-75, along with the segment of I-75 extending to the Georgia state line, was let to contract on July 26, 1959, and dedicated on May 31, 1961. The first major section to be completed was the western ascent of Monteagle Mountain, which stretched from SR 50 (now also US 64) near Pelham to US 41 (then also US 64) in Monteagle and eliminated a stretch of US 41 with several hazardous hairpin curves. Work began in September 1958, and the stretch opened to traffic on February 6, 1962. The short segment in Chattanooga between Belvoir Avenue and I-75 opened in late October 1962. This was followed by the short stretch between east of the railyard and Fourth Avenue on January 3, 1963.

In Nashville, a short segment of the concurrent segment with I-40, located between Fesslers Lane and the eastern interchange with that route, was declared complete on January 11, 1965. The section between the western interchange with I-40 (then also I-65) and Fesslers Lane was partially opened in late December 1963, and fully opened on April 19, 1965. The Silliman Evans Bridge, along with the stretch extending between US 41 (First Street) and I-40 was dedicated by Nashville mayor Beverly Briley on January 14, 1964. On July 27, 1965, the short section between US 431 (Trinity Lane) and US 41 (First Street) was opened. This section included provisions for the southern interchange with I-65 (then I-265), which had not been built yet. The section between the eastern I-40 interchange and SR 171 was opened around September 1965. The Ridge Cut section in Chattanooga, which spanned between Fourth Avenue and Germantown Road, let to contract in October 1963, and dedicated by Governor Buford Ellington and opened on December 1, 1965. On December 20, 1965, a 7.8-mile (12.6 km) stretching from near the foot of Monteagle Mountain to US 64/72 in Kimball was declared complete. To construct the segment at the foot of Lookout Mountain west of downtown Chattanooga, engineers shifted the river channel to the north to avoid impeding the flow. This was accomplished by dredging out the north bank and filling in along the south bank with approximately 250,000 short tons (220,000 long tons) of rock from a nearby quarry. The first contract for this stretch of I-24, which spanned from US 41 in Lookout Valley to 23rd Street near downtown Chattanooga, was awarded in June 1964, and was the most expensive individual highway contract in state history at the time. The section was dedicated and opened to traffic by Governor Frank G. Clement on December 16, 1966. It cost approximately $15 million (equivalent to $114 million in 2025), making it one of the most expensive highway projects, per mile, at the time.

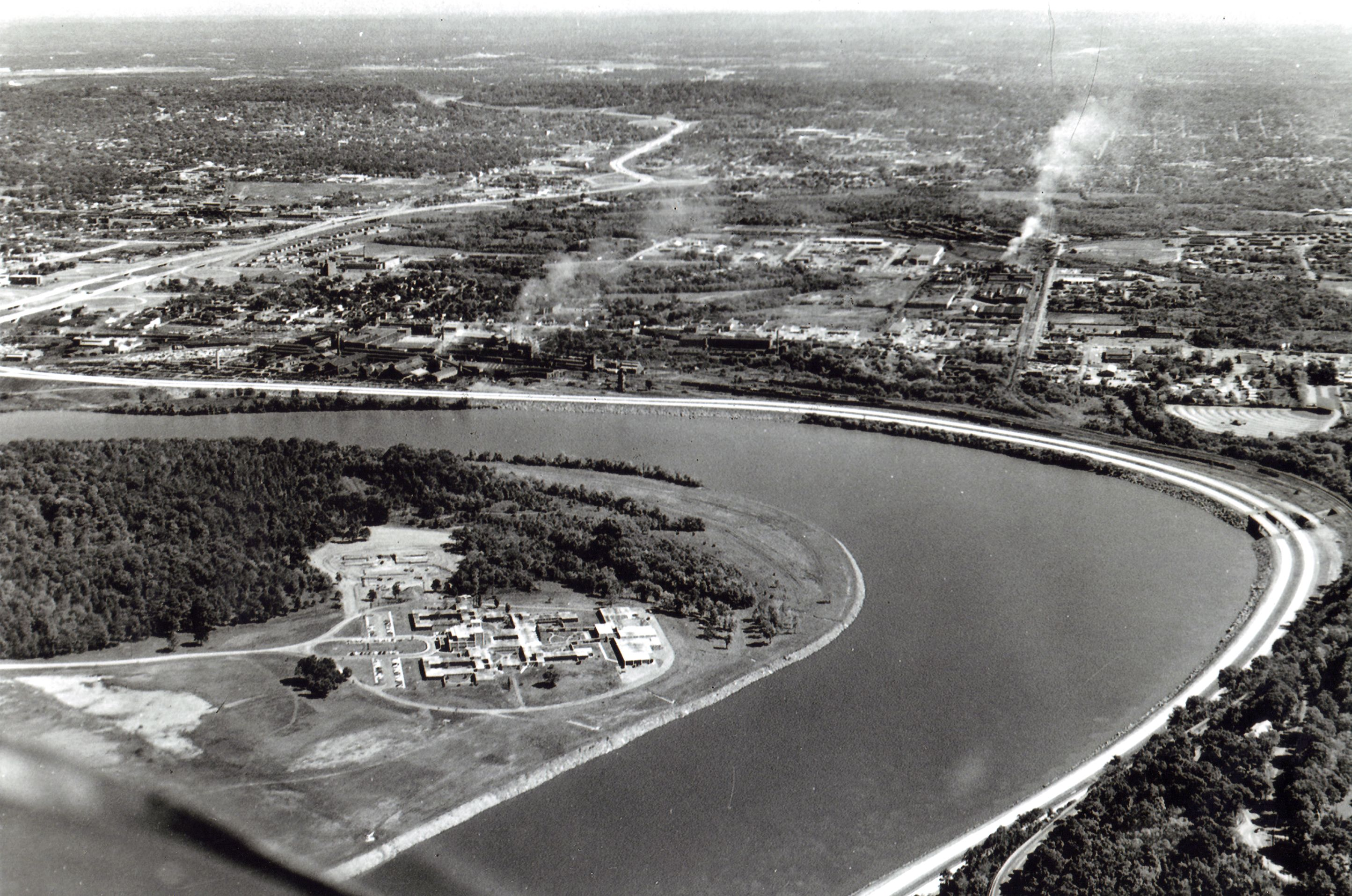
I-24 nearing completion in Chattanooga between Lookout Mountain and the Tennessee River along Moccasin Bend in 1966.

I-24 was opened between US 41 in Manchester and the western foot of Monteagle Mountain near Pelham on July 27, 1967. The short segment between SR 27 and SR 156 in Marion County, including the bridge over Nickajack Lake, opened on December 18, 1967. The stretch between US 41/64 in Lookout Valley and the interchange with I-59 in Dade County, Georgia, was jointly opened to traffic by both states on September 10, 1968, along with the eight-northernmost-miles (13 km) of I-59. This was followed by the adjacent section extending west to SR 156 in early November 1968. In Nashville, the short section between US 431 and the northern interchange with I-65, along with a short stretch of I-65 north of this section, opened to traffic on December 23, 1968. The section between US 41 in northwestern Coffee County and US 41 in Manchester opened on December 3, 1969. On December 9, 1970, I-24 opened between US 231 in Murfreesboro and SR 64 near Beechgrove. The adjacent section between SR 171 in Nashville and US 231 in Murfreesboro was partially opened on December 31, 1970, with part of it restricted to two lanes; all four lanes opened on August 5, 1971. The westbound lanes of the eastern Monteagle ascent were opened to traffic on September 29, 1971. The original US 41/64 highway on the eastern ascent was then converted into the eastbound lanes of I-24. The last segment of I-24 between Nashville and Chattanooga, the segment located between SR 64 near Beechgrove and US 41 northwest of Manchester, was let to contract on January 31, 1969, and opened and dedicated by Governor Winfield Dunn on December 16, 1971.

Construction began on I-24 between the Kentucky line and SR 48 in Clarksville on April 12, 1971. In February 1972, the FHWA announced that it was redistributing funds that had been budgeted for Interstate construction in Tennessee to other states which were further behind on their Interstates. I-24 between Nashville and Kentucky was one of the sections affected by this cutback, which threatened to delay completion. In response, the state legislature authorized issuing $100 million (equivalent to $583 million in 2025) in bonds to finance the completion of I-24. This allowed TDOT to let contracts for the remaining sections between Nashville and Clarksville from September to November 1972. Once construction on the remainder of I-24 between Clarksville and Nashville was underway, the route was projected to be completed in late 1974 or early 1975, but would experience further delays as a result of geological problems. Construction on this approximately 44-mile (71 km) segment, the last segment of mainline Interstate Highway completed in Tennessee, proved to be difficult due to the rugged and hilly terrain. The approximately 32-mile (51 km) segment between US 68 in Hopkinsville, Kentucky, and US 79 in Clarksville, Tennessee, was jointly opened to traffic by both states on September 12, 1975. The 15-mile (24 km) section between US 79 and SR 49 in Robertson County was opened on October 1, 1976. The last segment of I-24 in Tennessee, between SR 49 and I-65 in Nashville, was opened to traffic on January 5, 1978, more than two years behind schedule.

=== Expansion and improvement projects ===
==== Earlier projects ====
Even before I-24 was completed, portions of the route were already outdated and over capacity, and the first improvement projects were initiated. The Silliman Evans Bridge was widened from six to eight lanes in a project that completely closed the northbound span between January 20, 1974, and April 6, 1975, and the southbound span from April 6, 1975, to November 16, 1975. This project also added shoulders to the bridge and removed railings that had been deemed unsafe and were believed to have played a role in multiple fatal accidents on the bridge. In November 1977, the Tennessee Department of Transportation (TDOT) installed a system to detect tailgating vehicles in the westbound lanes of the concurrent segment with I-40, which consisted of sensors embedded in the roadway connected to overhead warning signs with flashing lights and horns. The system was the first of its kind in the country but experienced technical problems and was criticized as ineffective, leading to its decommission in July 1980. This segment was widened from six to eight lanes between July 1979 and January 1980 by removing the right shoulders, narrowing the lanes by one foot (0.30 m), and shifting traffic slightly to the left.

In Chattanooga, the stretch between the bottom of the Ridge Cut and east of the Big Scramble was widened in the mid-to-later 1980s by adding auxiliary lanes. Between May 1989 and November 1991, the Big Scramble was modified in a project that eliminated left-hand entrance and exit ramps, widened parts of the main carriageway, and converted the westbound lanes of I-24 into the ramp carrying I-24 westbound traffic to US 27 northbound. The 4.7-mile (7.6 km) stretch in Nashville between near SR 255 (Harding Place) and near SR 254 (Bell Road) was widened to six lanes between April 1989 and November 1990. Between November 1994 and November 1995, TDOT made safety modifications to I-24 through the eastern terminus with I-440 and the nearby split with I-40, which reconfigured the routes to provide direct access to I-440 westbound from I-40 westbound, splitting I-24's eastbound lanes into two barrier-separated carriageways. In Georgia, the interchange was modified in a project between February 2002 and August 2004 that replaced the bridges and extended the auxiliary lanes to reduce merging hazards.

I-24 in southeast Nashville.

The approximately 9.3-mile (15.0 km) segment between Haywood Lane in Nashville and SR 266 in Smyrna was widened from four to eight lanes between June 1997 and December 1998, installing the first HOV lanes on I-24. Between September 1997 and December 1998, the concurrent section with I-65 through the US 431 was widened from six to eight lanes in a project that also converted this interchange from a cloverleaf into a partial cloverleaf interchange. The 8.2-mile (13.2 km) portion between SR 266 and I-840 was widened from four to eight lanes between August 1998 and November 2000. The four-mile (6.4 km) segment between I-440 and Haywood Lane was widened from three to four lanes in each direction between March 2000 and May 2002 in a project that also improved the interchanges on this segment. Widening of the segment between I-840 and SR 96 began in early 2004 and was completed in the summer of 2005. This project added a new interchange at Medical Center Parkway. A project that widened I-24 from four to eight lanes between SR 96 and US 231, and also added a new interchange with SR 99, began in April 2006 and was completed on January 28, 2008. In Nashville, the short concurrent stretch with I-65 between US 431 and the northern split with this route was reconstructed and widened from four to five lanes in each direction between October 2012 and May 2016, along with a short segment of I-65 continuing to the north. This was the last of three phases of a larger expansion project on I-65.

==== Monteagle Mountain reconstruction ====
A project began in April 1985 that extensively straightened and rebuilt the eastbound lanes of I-24 on the eastern downgrade of Monteagle Mountain and reduced the grade. The project also added left shoulders and an additional runaway truck ramp, the latter of which was not originally planned. This work was completed in 1989, and the lanes were reopened on July 11 of that year in a ceremony officiated by Governor Ned McWherter. The project experienced many setbacks including geological problems, which caused extensive delays. Originally targeted for completion in December 1987 at a cost of $17 million (equivalent to $41.3 million in 2025), the final cost was $29.5 million (equivalent to $66.6 million in 2025). During this project, both directions of traffic were routed to the westbound lanes of I-24, which were separated by a Jersey barrier, and a temporary runaway truck ramp for eastbound traffic was also provided along this alignment. A truck station to allow for the adjustment of brakes opened in January 1992. After the safety improvements were completed, accidents in the eastbound lanes of this stretch dropped from 54 in 1983 to three in 1991.

==== 75/24 Split reconstruction ====
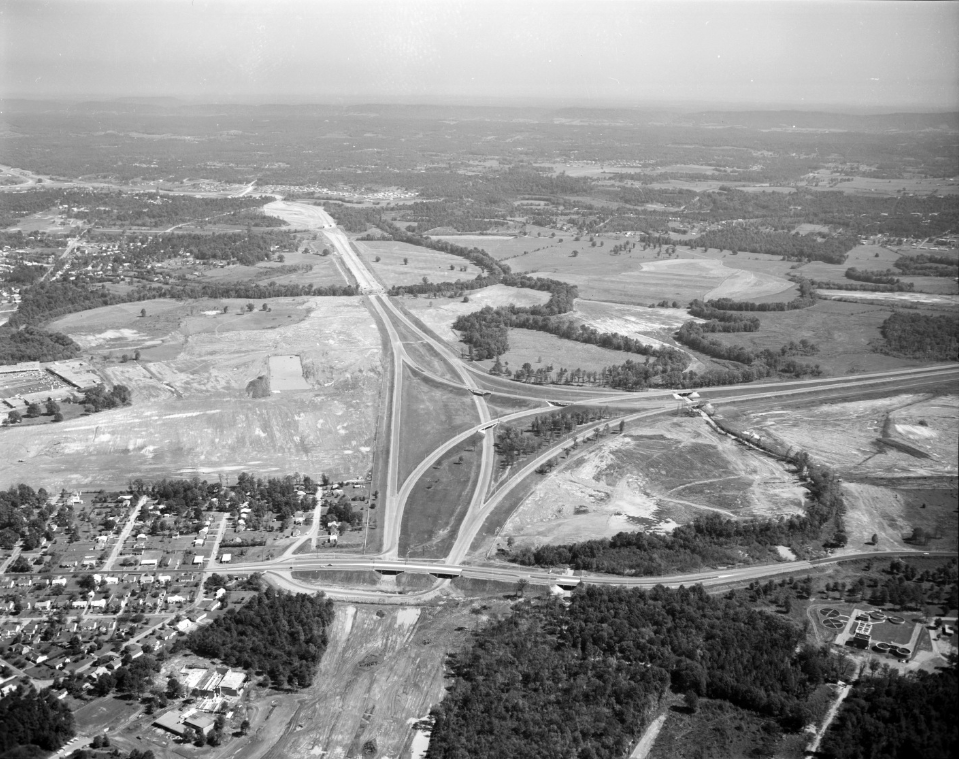
Original configuration of the 75/24 Split in the early 1960s.

The original interchange with I-75, which was a simple directional-T design, had repeatedly been ranked as one of the top 10 worst freight bottlenecks in the US by the American Transportation Research Institute and contained several sharp curves and other safety hazards. In December 2018, a contract was awarded to rebuild the interchange, with preliminary work beginning in May 2019. The project consisted of eliminating left-hand entrance and exit ramps from I-75 onto I-24, straightening curves, widening I-75 to six lanes through the interchange, widening two ramps from I-75 to I-24 to three lanes, replacing two overpass bridges, and construction of a collector–distributor facility that carries traffic directly from US 41 and the Tennessee Welcome Center along I-75 northbound, providing direct access to both I-75 northbound and I-24 westbound. Additional space was also provided to widen the remaining ramps between I-75 and I-24 to three lanes, which will be done in the second phase. The project was completed on August 19, 2021, for $133.5 million, making it the second-most expensive individual contract in state history at the time.

In preparation for the second phase, the Belvoir Avenue overpass and Germantown Road underpass were replaced between May 2020 and August 2021; the latter replacement utilized accelerated bridge construction by shifting I-24 traffic onto the Germantown Road entrance and exit ramp and adjacent frontage roads. Construction on the second phase began on July 13, 2023. This project consisted of widening the section of I-24 between the split and Germantown Road, realignment of the ramps between the Germantown Road and Belvoir Avenue/Moore Road exits, extending the auxiliary lanes along I-75 to SR 320, replacing the bridge over the CSX railroad on I-75 between these two interchanges with a higher bridge, and expanding the ramps in the interchange into their final alignments. The project was originally slated for completion in late summer 2025, and the portion on I-24 and through the split was largely completed on time. However, in April 2025, TDOT officials announced that the section of I-75 around the railroad crossing and the SR 320 interchange was behind schedule, and the project would continue past its original deadline. In July 2025, further delays were reported, and the projected completion date was revised to spring 2026. The delays were reported to have been caused by coordination problems with CSX over the replacement of the railroad bridge, which pushed the start of that portion of the project to early 2024. The final phase was completed and dedicated in a ceremony on April 24, 2026.

==== Moccasin Bend widening project ====
TDOT and GDOT have jointly planned to widen the 10-mile (16 km) stretch of I-24 from I-59 to US 27 in Chattanooga to six lanes for many years. This stretch of I-24 has long been over capacity, suffering from congestion and a high crash rate. Part of the stretch is located on a narrow artificial fill between Lookout Mountain and the Tennessee River across from Moccasin Bend and has a narrower median than usual, further complicating the project. An engineering study was first completed for this project in August 2018, and environmental studies under the National Environmental Policy Act were underway in August 2021. The latter was required due to the project's location in two states.

Due to its complexity, the project is planned to be split into three phases and delivered through the nontraditional Construction Manager/General Contractor method. Public hearings were held in July 2025. The first two phases, located between US 27 and Browns Ferry Road, and from there to the Georgia state line, are expected to begin in 2027.

==== I-24 SMART Corridor and I-24 MOTION ====
The 28-mile (45 km) stretch of I-24 between I-440 (exit 53) in Nashville and US 231 (exit 81) in Murfreesboro was developed into the "I-24 SMART Corridor" in an effort to address congestion and mobility issues. In recent years, this stretch of I-24 has become the most congested highway corridor in the state, due to the rapid growth of the region. The project pairs this stretch with the adjacent paralleling stretch of US 41/US 70S (Murfreesboro Road) and all connecting roads in between. The first phase, which ran from October 2018 to December 2021, included the construction of emergency pull-offs, improvements to multiple entrance and exit ramps, the erection of additional roadside dynamic-message signs (DMSs), and upgrades to traffic signals along the corridor. The second phase, which began in March 2022, includes the erection of 67 overhead gantries with signs between mileposts 53 and 70 that will display recommended variable speed limits and variable lane control signs for each lane. The final phase, which is a long-term priority, will include the installation of ramp meters on certain onramps and additional closed-circuit television (CCTV) cameras and DMS boards and Americans with Disabilities Act of 1990 (ADA) improvements along connecting arterials.

In conjunction with the smart corridor project, TDOT initiated an experimental research project called the I-24 Mobility Technology Interstate Observation Network (I-24 MOTION) in 2022. It was funded by the FHWA's Congestion Mitigation and Air Quality (CMAQ) Improvement Program. The project installed over 300 4k resolution cameras along a six-mile (9.7 km) stretch between SR 254 and Waldron Road, mounted on 110-foot-tall (34 m) poles spaced every 500 to 600 feet (150 to 180 m) apart. These cameras convert images into a digital model showing how every vehicle behaves with unparalleled detail, using artificial intelligence software developed at Vanderbilt University. Researchers use this data to study traffic flow patterns and propose new solutions to reduce traffic congestion. Information collected from I-24 MOTION was first used by the CIRCLES project, a multi-university and multi-agency collaboration between the U.S. Department of Energy and the Institute of Transportation Studies at the University of California, Berkeley.

==== I-24 Southeast Choice Lanes ====
In 2023, the Tennessee General Assembly passed the Transportation Modernization Act, which authorized TDOT to construct express toll lanes, which they call Choice Lanes, through public-private partnerships for the first time. In December 2023, they announced the first such facility, called the I-24 Southeast Choice Lanes, would be built on I-24 between the western I-40 split near downtown Nashville and I-840 near Murfreesboro. This corridor was chosen because of its consistent traffic congestion that is more prolonged throughout the day relative to other corridors. The project includes a total of 26 miles (42 km) of new toll lanes, including two toll lanes in each direction on I-24, and short connecting branch lanes on I-40, I-440, and SR 155. Public hearings began in 2024, and on August 19, 2026, the state announced they had selected a private-sector partner to finance, build, and operate the lanes. The project is expected to cost $9.2 billion, making it one of the most expensive highway projects in the country's history.

==== Clarksville to Nashville ====
The rapid growth of Middle Tennessee has resulted in congestion and hazards on the four-lane section of I-24 between Clarksville and Nashville. By the 2020s, portions of this section were carrying an annual average daily traffic count of more than 80,000 vehicles per day, one of the highest traffic counts on any highway with two lanes in each direction in the country. While TDOT has had plans to widen the 11-mile (18 km) stretch between the Kentucky line since at least 2017, they have no plans to widen the 33-mile (53 km) section between SR 76 and I-65 in northern Nashville. This has received extensive criticism, and since 2021, the local governments in Clarksville have passed resolutions asking TDOT to widen this section. Federal officials, including U.S. Senator Marsha Blackburn, have also expressed support for the project. Since 2023, the state legislature has provided additional funding to TDOT to accelerate road projects. Despite this, TDOT has planned the widening of I-24 through Clarksville as one of its last projects, tentatively planning to begin construction in 2034. They also dropped a plan to widen the five-mile (8.0 km) section between SR 45 and I-65, despite additional funding. These actions have drawn further ire from locals, who have continued to ask TDOT to accelerate the timeline for the section through Clarksville, as well as widen the entire stretch between Clarksville and Nashville.

=== Major incidents ===
On July 27, 1973, a station wagon traveling on the northbound span of the Silliman Evans Bridge in Nashville crashed through the bridge's guardrails, exited the roadway, and landed on the ground about 100 feet (30 m) below, killing eight of the nine occupants and injuring the other. The accident was investigated by the National Transportation Safety Board (NTSB), which named several unsafe design features of the bridge as contributors to the crash. The report also concluded that the state had been aware of the safety hazards of the bridge's rails prior to the accident, which had played a role in previous fatal accidents on the bridge. This accident was cited as the primary event that led to the widening project on the bridge months later.

On May 1, 2010, the first major flash flood of the 2010 Tennessee floods submerged I-24 in the Antioch area of Nashville when Mill Creek spilled over its banks. One person in a car on the Interstate was killed. A TDOT camera captured the waters overflow rapidly onto the road's surface and flood cars, followed by a portable classroom from a nearby school float down the Interstate and disintegrate. On May 18, 2010, a sinkhole opened in the eastbound lanes of I-24 near the US 64/SR 50 exit (exit 127) in Grundy County. TDOT officials stated that the hole was growing and diverted traffic onto the westbound lanes. Following emergency repairs, the highway reopened four days later.

== Exit list ==
State	County	Location	mi	km	Exit	Destinations	Notes
Tennessee	Montgomery	Clarksville	0.00	0.00		I-24 west – Paducah, St. Louis	Continuation into Kentucky
Tennessee	Montgomery	Clarksville	1.61	2.59	1	SR 48 – Clarksville, Trenton	
Tennessee	Montgomery	Clarksville	4.51	7.26	4	US 79 (LG Highway / Wilma Rudolph Boulevard) – Clarksville, Guthrie	Access to Austin Peay State University and Tennessee College of Applied Technology at Clarksville
Tennessee	Montgomery	Clarksville	7.95	12.79	8	SR 237 (Hankook Road / Rossview Road)	Access to Dunbar Cave State Park
Tennessee	Montgomery	Clarksville	10.61	17.08	11	SR 76 (Dr. Martin Luther King Jr. Parkway) – Clarksville, Adams	Access to Port Royal State Park
Tennessee	Robertson		19.17	30.85	19	SR 256 (Maxey Road) – Adams	
Tennessee	Robertson	Pleasant View–Coopertown line	24.41	39.28	24	SR 49 – Springfield, Ashland City	
Tennessee	Cheatham		31.02	49.92	31	SR 249 (New Hope Road)	
Tennessee	Davidson	Nashville	35.16	56.58	35	US 431 – Springfield, Joelton	
Tennessee	Davidson	Nashville	40.70	65.50	40	SR 45 (Old Hickory Boulevard)	
Tennessee	Davidson	Nashville	43.40	69.85	43	SR 155 (Briley Parkway)	SR 155 exits 18A-B; access to Nashville International Airport
Tennessee	Davidson	Nashville	44.17– 44.81	71.08– 72.11	44	I-65 – Louisville, Nashville	Western end of I-65 concurrency; signed as exits 44A (south) and exit 44B (north) eastbound; I-65 exit 88
Tennessee	Davidson	Nashville	45.79	73.69	87	US 431 (Trinity Lane)	
Tennessee	Davidson	Nashville	46.42– 47.05	74.71– 75.72	46B	I-65 south to I-40 west – Memphis, Huntsville	Southern end of I-65 concurrency; I-65 exit 86 southbound; signed as exits 46A (I-24 west/I-65 north) and 46B (I-65 south) westbound
Tennessee	Davidson	Nashville	47.63– 47.93	76.65– 77.14	47	North First Street / Jefferson Street	
Tennessee	Davidson	Nashville	47.93	77.14	47A	US 31E (Ellington Parkway) / Spring Street	
Tennessee	Davidson	Nashville	48.43– 48.51	77.94– 78.07	48	James Robertson Parkway (US 31 / US 41 / US 431) – State Capitol	
Tennessee	Davidson	Nashville	48.90	78.70	49	Korean Vets Boulevard / Shelby Avenue – Nissan Stadium	
Tennessee	Davidson	Nashville	49.33– 49.93	79.39– 80.35	Silliman Evans Bridge over the Cumberland River		
Tennessee	Davidson	Nashville	49.74– 50.06	80.05– 80.56	50	I-40 west to I-65 south – Memphis, Huntsville	Western end of I-40 concurrency; signed as I-40 exit 211 westbound; signed as exits 50A (I-40 east/I-24 east) and 50B (I-40 west to I-65 south) eastbound
Tennessee	Davidson	Nashville	50.42	81.14	212	Hermitage Avenue (US 70)	Westbound exit; exit number follows I-40
Tennessee	Davidson	Nashville	50.97	82.03	212	Fesslers Lane	Eastbound exit
Tennessee	Davidson	Nashville	51.44– 51.85	82.78– 83.44	52B	I-40 east – Knoxville	Eastern end of I-40 concurrency; I-40 exit 213A; access to Nashville International Airport
Tennessee	Davidson	Nashville	51.85	83.44	52	US 41 / US 70S (Murfreesboro Road)	
Tennessee	Davidson	Nashville	52.19– 53.04	83.99– 85.36	53	I-440 west – Memphis	Eastern terminus of I-440
Tennessee	Davidson	Nashville	53.70	86.42	54	SR 155 (Briley Parkway)	SR 155 exits 3A-B
Tennessee	Davidson	Nashville	55.71	89.66	56	SR 255 (Harding Place)	Access to Nashville International Airport
Tennessee	Davidson	Nashville	57.02	91.76	57	Haywood Lane – Antioch	Signed as exits 57A (west) and 57B (east) eastbound
Tennessee	Davidson	Nashville	59.40	95.60	59	SR 254 (Bell Road)	
Tennessee	Davidson	Nashville	60.08	96.69	60	Hickory Hollow Parkway / William Turner Parkway	
Tennessee	Davidson	Nashville	62.54	100.65	62	SR 171 (Old Hickory Boulevard)	
Tennessee	Rutherford	La Vergne	64.55	103.88	64	Waldron Road – La Vergne	
Tennessee	Rutherford	Smyrna	66.30	106.70	66	SR 266 east (Sam Ridley Parkway) – Smyrna	Signed as exits 66A (west) and 66B (east) eastbound
Tennessee	Rutherford	Smyrna	69.90	112.49	70	SR 102 (Nissan Drive / Lee Victory Parkway / Almaville Road) – Smyrna	
Tennessee	Rutherford		74.12– 75.11	119.28– 120.88	74	I-840 – Memphis, Franklin, Knoxville, Lebanon	Signed as exits 74A (west) and 74B (east); I-840 exits 53A-B; former SR 840
Tennessee	Rutherford	Murfreesboro	76.21	122.65	76	Fortress Boulevard / Medical Center Parkway	
Tennessee	Rutherford	Murfreesboro	77.98	125.50	78	SR 96 – Franklin, Murfreesboro	Signed as exits 78A (west) and 78B (east)
Tennessee	Rutherford	Murfreesboro	79.80	128.43	80	SR 99 – Murfreesboro	
Tennessee	Rutherford	Murfreesboro	81.23	130.73	81	US 231 – Shelbyville, Murfreesboro	Signed as exits 81A (south) and 81B (north) eastbound
Tennessee	Rutherford	Murfreesboro	83.58	134.51	84	Joe B. Jackson Parkway	Signed as exits 84A (south) and 84B (north) eastbound
Tennessee	Rutherford		88.79	142.89	89	Buchanan – Epps Mill Road	
Tennessee	Coffee–Bedford county line		96.85	155.86	97	SR 64 (Beechgrove Road) – Shelbyville	
Tennessee	Coffee		105.23	169.35	105	US 41	
Tennessee	Coffee	Manchester	110.22	177.38	110	SR 53 – Manchester, Woodbury	
Tennessee	Coffee	Manchester	111.23	179.01	111	SR 55 – Manchester, Tullahoma, McMinnville	Signed as exits 111A (south) and 111B (north) eastbound
Tennessee	Coffee	Manchester	113.77	183.10	114	US 41 – Manchester	
Tennessee	Coffee	Arnold AFB	117.20	188.62	117	Arnold Air Force Base – Tullahoma	
Tennessee	Grundy	Pelham	127.54	205.26	127	US 64 west / SR 50 – Pelham, Winchester	West end of US 64 concurrency
Tennessee	Grundy	Monteagle			Rest area		
Tennessee	Marion–Grundy county line	Monteagle	134.33	216.18	134	US 41A – Monteagle, Sewanee	
Tennessee	Marion	Monteagle	135.48	218.03	135	To US 41 north – Monteagle, Tracy City	Western end of SR 2 concurrency
Tennessee	Marion		142.94	230.04	143	SR 2 (Martin Springs Road)	Eastern end of SR 2 concurrency; SR 2 is only signed on I-24 eastbound one mile (1.6 km) before interchange
Tennessee	Marion	Kimball	151.93	244.51	152	US 64 east / US 72 to US 41 – Kimball, South Pittsburg	Eastern end of US 64 concurrency; western end of SR 27 concurrency
Tennessee	Marion	Jasper	155.62	250.45	155	SR 28 – Jasper, Dunlap	
Tennessee	Marion		158.68	255.37	158	SR 27 east – Nickajack Dam, Powells Crossroads	Eastern end of SR 27 concurrency
Tennessee	Marion		160.34– 160.94	258.04– 259.01	Holman J. Walker Bridge over Nickajack Lake on the Tennessee River		
Tennessee	Marion	Haletown	161.33	259.64	161	SR 156 – Haletown, New Hope	
Tennessee	Hamilton	No major junctions					
			166.9 0.00	268.6 0.00	Tennessee–Georgia state line; western end of unsigned SR 409 concurrency		
Georgia	Dade		0.85– 1.63	1.37– 2.62	167	I-59 south (Korean War Veterans Memorial Highway south / SR 406 south) – Birmingham	Left exit and entrance westbound; exit numbers continue from Tennessee numbering; northern terminus of I-59
Georgia	Dade		3.55	5.71	169	SR 299 to US 11 – Wildwood	
			4.13 171.0	6.65 275.2	Georgia–Tennessee state line; eastern end of unsigned SR 409 concurrency		
Tennessee	Hamilton	Chattanooga	173.95	279.95	174	US 41 / US 64 to US 11 – Lookout Valley, Lookout Mountain	
Tennessee	Hamilton	Chattanooga	175.24	282.02	175	Browns Ferry Road – Lookout Mountain	
Tennessee	Hamilton	Chattanooga	178.29– 179.46	286.93– 288.81	178	US 27 north – Downtown Chattanooga	Western end of US 27 concurrency; southern terminus of unsigned I-124; signed as Exit 178A eastbound; westbound access via collector-distributor facility
Tennessee	Hamilton	Chattanooga	178.29– 179.46	286.93– 288.81	178B	US 11 / US 41 / US 64 (Broad Street) – Lookout Mountain Williams Street SR 58 (Market Street) – Downtown Chattanooga, Lookout Mountain	Eastbound access between US 11/41/64, Williams Street, and SR 58 via frontage road; no access to US 11/41/64 and Williams Street from I-24 westbound; westbound access to SR 58/Long Street via collector distributor ramp between I-24 westbound and US 27 northbound; westbound interchange is unnumbered
Tennessee	Hamilton	Chattanooga	179.76– 180.27	289.30– 290.12	180	US 27 south (Rossville Boulevard) to SR 8 north / Central Avenue	Eastern end of US 27 concurrency; signed as exits 180A (north) and 180B (south); eastbound access to Central Avenue (180A) and Rossville Boulevard (180B)
Tennessee	Hamilton	Chattanooga	181.04	291.36	181	Fourth Avenue	
Tennessee	Hamilton	Chattanooga	181.50	292.10	181A	US 41 south – East Ridge	Eastbound exit and westbound entrance
Tennessee	Hamilton	Chattanooga	182.00– 182.50	292.90– 293.71	Missionary Ridge crossing		
Tennessee	Hamilton	Chattanooga–East Ridge line	183.06– 183.57	294.61– 295.43	183A	Belvoir Avenue / Germantown Road	Signed as exit 183 eastbound; access between Belvoir Avenue and Germantown Road via Frontage Roads
Tennessee	Hamilton	East Ridge	184.33	296.65	184	Moore Road	Access via Frontage Roads; ramps overlap with Exit 183
Tennessee	Hamilton	East Ridge	185.30	298.21	185	I-75 (US 74 east) – Atlanta, Knoxville	Eastern terminus; signed as exits 185A (south) and 185B (north); exit 2 on I-75
Tennessee	Hamilton	1.000 mi = 1.609 km; 1.000 km = 0.621 mi: Concurrency terminus; Incomplete access					

== Notes ==
Interstate 24
Previous state: Kentucky	Tennessee, Georgia	Next state: Terminus
