= Ches =

Ches may refer to:

- Assata Shakur (married name Joanne Chesimard), nickname
- CHES (buffer)
- Ches Crist (1882–1957), American baseball player
- Ches Crosbie (born 1953), Canadian lawyer and politician
- Ches McCartney (1901–1998), American itinerant wanderer
- Ches Smith, American musician
- William Cheswick ("Ches") a computer security and networking researcher

== See also ==
- Chés Cabotans, marionette show from Amiens, France
- Chez (disambiguation)
- Chess
