= Monteagle Mountain =

Mountain and stretch of Interstate 24 in Tennessee

Highest point
- Elevation: 1,933 ft (589 m)
- Coordinates: 35°14′N 85°52′W

Geography
- Location: Grundy and Marion counties, Tennessee, U.S.
- Parent range: Appalachian Mountains, Appalachian Plateau, Cumberland Plateau
- Topo map: USGS Monteagle Mountain

Climbing
- First ascent: Unknown
- Easiest route: Drive via Interstate 24

Monteagle Mountain is the local name given to a portion of the Cumberland Plateau and a stretch of Interstate 24 (I-24) near Monteagle, Tennessee. Being part of the plateau, it is not technically a mountain, but appears that way to motorists crossing over it. The Interstate across the plateau here, with gradients of 6%, is frequently referenced as one of the most treacherous stretches of highway in the United States, especially in inclement weather. It rises to an elevation of around 1,933 feet (589 m). This is the highest point on both I-24 and U.S. Route 41.

== Description ==
Monteagle Mountain is a part of the Cumberland Plateau, which is in turn part of the larger Appalachian Plateau of the Appalachian Mountains. East of the mountain is a deep stream gorge, or gulf, that runs for several miles. The west side of the mountain is effectively the western escarpment of the plateau, with the Highland Rim below. This part of the plateau reaches an elevation of 1,933 feet (589 m) and is one of its narrowest parts. The mountain is situated in the southeastern part of the U.S. state of Tennessee in Grundy County on the west side, Marion County on the east, and a sliver of Franklin County on the southwest. The mountain is also on the border of Middle and East Tennessee, two of the Grand Divisions of Tennessee defined in state law. The town of Monteagle, where the mountain gets its name, is situated stop the plateau on this part. Sewanee is a few miles to the southwest.

U.S. Route 41 (US 41) crosses the mountain in a crooked alignment, and US 41A ascends the western escarpment and reaches its terminus with US 41 in Monteagle. I-24 parallels US 41 and crosses the mountain, providing two interchanges and a rest area near the top. US 64 also runs concurrently with I-24 on this stretch. US 41 once followed what is now the eastbound lanes of I-24 descending the plateau on the east side; it was moved onto its present route to the north of here after the Interstate was completed. US 64 also once ran concurrently with US 41A to Monteagle. It was moved onto a concurrency with I-24 on the western escarpment of the plateau in the 1990s after a section of that road west of the plateau was upgraded. Monteagle Mountain is the highest elevation on both I-24 and US 41.

I-24 westbound ascending Monteagle Mountain

The section of I-24 and US 64, which is also known tautologically as "Monteagle Mountain" or "Monteagle", consists of a 12-to-13-mile-long (19 to 21 km) segment in Grundy and Marion counties. Monteagle Mountain is best known for its eastern descent, but its western descent is also one of the most hazardous stretches of Interstate Highway as well. Compared to grades elsewhere, Monteagle's 4–6% grade over a period of several miles does not come close to the steepest. The route has six lanes over the eastern escarpment, with an extra westbound lane serving as a truck climbing lane and an extra eastbound lane for slowed trucks. The western escarpment has four lanes. The Tennessee Department of Transportation (TDOT) has yet to construct a truck lane on the western ascent.

On the eastern descent of the plateau, the eastbound lanes contain a 6% grade over a length of about 4.1 miles (6.6 km) where the elevation drops 1,161 feet (354 m), and is particularly hazardous to truckers. The steepest grade here reaches 6.9%. At the top of this downgrade is a truck inspection station, and further down it contains two runaway truck ramps, which are on the left due to the terrain. The speed limit in the eastbound lanes reduces to 55 miles per hour (89 km/h) and 45 miles per hour (72 km/h) for trucks, with some trucks encouraged to slow to 25 to 35 miles per hour (40 to 56 km/h) depending on their weight. The speed limit in the westbound lanes is 55 miles per hour (89 km/h), with no separate restrictions for trucks.

The eastern downgrade of Monteagle Mountain is also unique in that it contains the third-widest median of any Interstate Highway; the others are I-8 through the In-Ko-Pah grade in California and I-84 through the Cabbage Hill grade east of Pendleton, Oregon.. The east and westbound lanes follow two separate natural valleys in the plateau separated by a ridge, and there is more than one mile (1.6 km) between the eastbound and westbound lanes at one point. The westbound ascent is approximately 1.2 miles (1.9 km) longer than the eastbound descent, making the westbound side slightly out of line with mileage signing.

The western downgrade of Monteagle Mountain on I-24 drops 778 feet (237 m) over four miles (6.4 km), with a 5% grade. While not considered as hazardous as the eastbound descent, the westbound descent contains many curves, including one "c-shaped" curve, protracted over a distance of almost one mile (1.6 km). The eastbound and westbound lanes are also positioned very close together, and crossover crashes and crashes with Jersey barriers located in the median in some places are another hazard. This segment also features off-ramp approach-style lane dividers, in order to slow both motorists and truckers. The speed limit on the downhill westbound lanes of this stretch is 55 miles per hour (89 km/h) and 45 miles per hour (72 km/h) for trucks, while on the uphill eastbound lanes it is 55 miles per hour (89 km/h), with no separate truck restrictions.

While the approximately two-mile (3.2 km) section atop the mountain between the grades is not hazardous, the 55-mile-per-hour (89 km/h) speed limit is maintained. East of the grade, the route passes through the deep plateau valley alongside Battle Creek, with slight banked curves as it enters Kimball and South Pittsburg. West of the grade, the route enters the relatively flat terrain of the Eastern Highland Rim, passing through Pelham.

== History ==
The mountain was part of the Cherokee homeland until 1817. The mountain was named "Eagle Mountain" by the Cherokee because of the great number of golden eagles that roosted and nested along its ridge line. In fact, in honor of those birds, for many years a golden eagle sat in the park in Monteagle until it was stolen as a school prank. It now sits in display at Tennessee Technological University in Cookeville.

The mountain has long been a popular crossing spot for travelers because of its location on one of the narrowest sections of the plateau. After the Cherokee were removed, the area was opened for European American settlement. One of the last detachments of Cherokees on the Trail of Tears crossed the mountain in late October 1838. During the American Civil War, the trails and railroads passing through the area were some of the most important supply routes, and consequently, among the most fought over. The area was renamed "Moffit's Station" in May 1870 by John Moffat, a native of Glasgow, Scotland, with his wife and children. It would later become "Moffat Station" and still later, the city of Monteagle.

In the early 20th century, the trail across the mountain became part of the Dixie Highway, an auto trail and network of roads between Chicago and Miami. The first road for automobiles was constructed across the mountain in 1923, and that year this road was designated as part of State Route 2 (SR 2) with the establishment of the Tennessee State Route System. This road became part of US 41 and US 64 when the U.S. Highway System was established in 1926. During the 1920s, American crime boss Al Capone reportedly used RyeMabee, a hotel along this road in Monteagle, as his halfway stopover point between Chicago and Miami. US 41A was established in 1944. All of these early roads crossing Monteagle were hazardous with steep grades, and some contained hairpin curves. US 41 was later upgraded to a two-lane road with additional truck climbing lanes on both of the downgrades for a total of three lanes.

=== Interstate Highway era ===
I-24 was constructed across the mountain by grandfathering in and improving the original segment of US 41/US 64 on the east side. The route on the western downgrade of the mountain, which stretched from SR 50 (now also US 64) near Pelham to US 41 in Monteagle, constructed am entirely new roadway south of the old road, which had several hazardous hairpin turns. Work began in September 1958, and the stretch opened to traffic on February 6, 1962. Construction on the westbound lanes on the eastern grade, which were also on an entirely new footprint, was completed on September 29, 1971, and the three original lanes of US 41/64 were converted to the eastbound lanes of I-24.

Early in its history, the eastbound descent of Monteagle Mountain developed a high rate of crashes, particularly for truckers whose brakes had failed. In 1984, seven people were killed in crashes on this stretch alone. Beginning in April 1985, the eastbound lanes of I-24 on the eastern downgrade of Monteagle Mountain were extensively straightened and rebuilt, and the grades reduced. The project also added left shoulders and an additional runaway truck ramp. This work was completed in 1989, and the lanes were reopened on July 11 of that year in a ceremony officiated by Governor Ned McWherter. The project experienced many setbacks including geological problems, which delayed the project, and the inspection station and additional runaway truck ramp were also not initially planned. Originally targeted for completion in December 1987 at a cost of $17 million, the final cost was $29.5 million. During this time both directions of traffic were routed to the westbound lanes of I-24, and a temporary runaway truck ramp was built on this section. After the project was completed, eastbound I-24 was reopened. A truck station to allow for inspection and adjustment of brakes opened in January 1992.

After the safety improvements were completed, accidents in the eastbound lanes of this stretch dropped from 54 in 1983 to three in 1991.

== In popular culture ==
- The song "The Legend", written by Jerry Reed as the title song for the film Smokey and the Bandit, describes the Bandit in a harrowing journey down the Monteagle Grade in 1963.
- "Chattanooga City Limit Sign", a song sang by Johnny Cash
- "Monteagle Mountain", a song sang by Johnny Cash written by Thomas Richard McGibony for his 1990 album Boom Chicka Boom. The song is told from the point of view of a truck driver who nearly has an accident descending the eastern grade of the mountain.
