= Ches McCartney =

American itinerant wanderer (1901–1998)

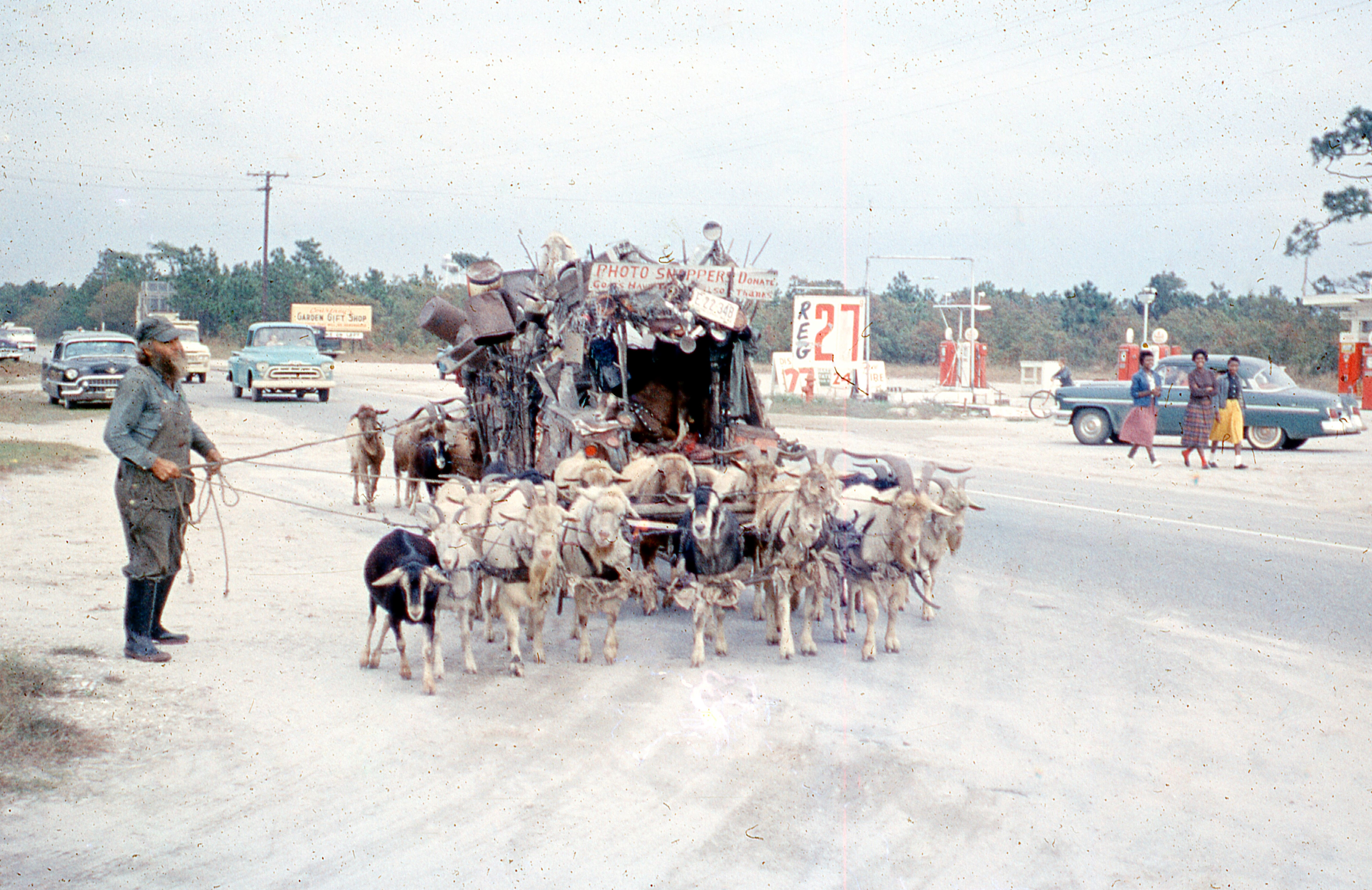
Charles "Ches" McCartney on Highway 19 in southern Georgia (October 1958).

Charles "Ches" McCartney (1901–1998), also known as the Goat Man, was an American itinerant wanderer who traveled up and down the eastern United States from 1930 to 1987 in a ramshackle wagon pulled by a team of goats. He claimed to have covered more than 100,000 miles and visited all states except Hawaii: His goats couldn't swim that far, he said, and if they could, "they'd just end up eating the grass skirts off the hula dancers anyway". He was a familiar sight to many travelers and vacationers during those years, and one difficult to not notice or remember.

The main sources for biographical information about McCartney are McCartney himself and his son, and some of the often-colorful details vary. McCartney was the subject of numerous newspaper articles over the years, many of which are collected in the book America's Goat Man (Mr. Ches McCartney).

== Early years ==
Born around the turn of the twentieth century (the exact year is unknown), McCartney ran away from his family's Iowa farm home at age 14.

In New York he met and married a Spanish knife thrower ten years his senior and became part of her act, serving as near-miss target. When she became pregnant they tried to make a living as farmers, but were wiped out at the start of the Great Depression. She left one day before dawn. McCartney married at least two more times.

At some point, while working for the WPA cutting timber, an injury from a falling tree left McCartney's left arm twisted. He was initially thought to have died in the accident, but he awakened on a mortician's table as the undertaker inserted an embalming needle in his arm.

McCartney had always been fond of goats since his days on the family farm, and he came up with the idea of using a goat cart to travel with his family and work as an itinerant preacher. His wife did not like the idea, and left. One account says that McCartney traded his wife to another farmer for an unspecified amount of goats.

== Inspirations ==
McCartney was taken with the book Robinson Crusoe, and carried a copy of it, along with a Bible, throughout his travels—the only two books he carried. Robinson Crusoe inspired him to dress himself and his son Albert in goat skins. It also possibly inspired or validated his independent lifestyle, in which he lived off the land, the contributions of strangers, and his goats.

== Travel rig ==
McCartney's iron-wheeled wagon was large, rickety, and garishly decorated with a clutter of objects he found and collected along the road. It contained a bed, a potbellied stove, lanterns, and lots of trash, and was pulled by a team of around nine goats, with a few trailing behind to occasionally push and serve as brakes on downhill stretches of road. His traveling goat herd sometimes numbered up to thirty. The goats were surprisingly sturdy and effective draft animals and McCartney managed to make five to ten miles a day, even pushing up Tennessee's Monteagle Mountain during a winter storm that stalled all other vehicle traffic. He claimed to have survived that cold night by pulling a couple of extra goats into the wagon with him.

Kids and doe goats rode in the wagon while bucks did the draft and push work. McCartney kept and cared for his sick and injured goats, including one which had no front legs and had learned to hop on its back legs like a kangaroo. He named all his goats, and one of his favorites, Billy Blue Horns, supposedly lived three decades.

The Goat Man usually kept his herd and rig to the sides of the roads he traveled, so while he may have slowed vehicle traffic, he rarely stopped it.

== Life on the road ==
McCartney's diet consisted mainly of goat milk, supplemented by food given to him or bought with money he made selling scrap metal he collected, postcards of himself, or from posing for pictures. He also accepted donations for his "Free Thinking Christian Mission" based in Georgia.

McCartney had no difficulty attracting attention and visitors as he was friendly, chatty, and quick to share an inspirational sermon. By most accounts he smelled very bad, as did his goats.

Each night he camped on some tolerant landowner's property or farmer's field. He milked and fed his goats and built a large campfire that he always topped off with an automobile tire. This added acridity to the fragrance of the bivouac, but McCartney claimed the smoke effectively kept the bugs away.

There were rumors that he was rich, and legends about how it was bad luck to harm him. These didn't protect him from being mugged with increasing frequency in later years on the road.

== Later years ==
After retiring from the road, McCartney and his son Albert Gene McCartney lived in a rusted old school bus in Twiggs County near Jeffersonville, Georgia, after the wooden shack they had been living in burned. Also on the property were an outhouse and a concrete "tomb" that supposedly housed the bodies of his father and stepmother. There was no running water or electricity.

McCartney became infatuated with the actress Morgan Fairchild and returned to the road in 1984 to hitchhike to California, ostensibly to woo her. He was mugged soon after arriving in Los Angeles, and that ended his road adventures.

Cormac McCarthy's 1979 novel Suttree, set in Knoxville, Tennessee, features a character based on McCartney.

Beginning in 1987 Ches McCartney lived out his late years in a nursing home in Macon, Georgia. In June 1998, he was given tragic news that his son (a character study in his own right) had been found shot to death on the Twiggs County property. McCartney requested that his son be buried in the tomb there, but it was found to be in disrepair. The city of Jeffersonville donated a cemetery plot to the McCartneys, and Albert Gene was buried there. The murder remains unsolved.

Less than six months after his son's death, Ches McCartney died. He was believed to be in his late nineties, but he had claimed to be 106.
