= Silliman Evans Bridge =

Highway bridge in Nashville, Tennessee, United States

Silliman Evans Sr. Memorial Bridges
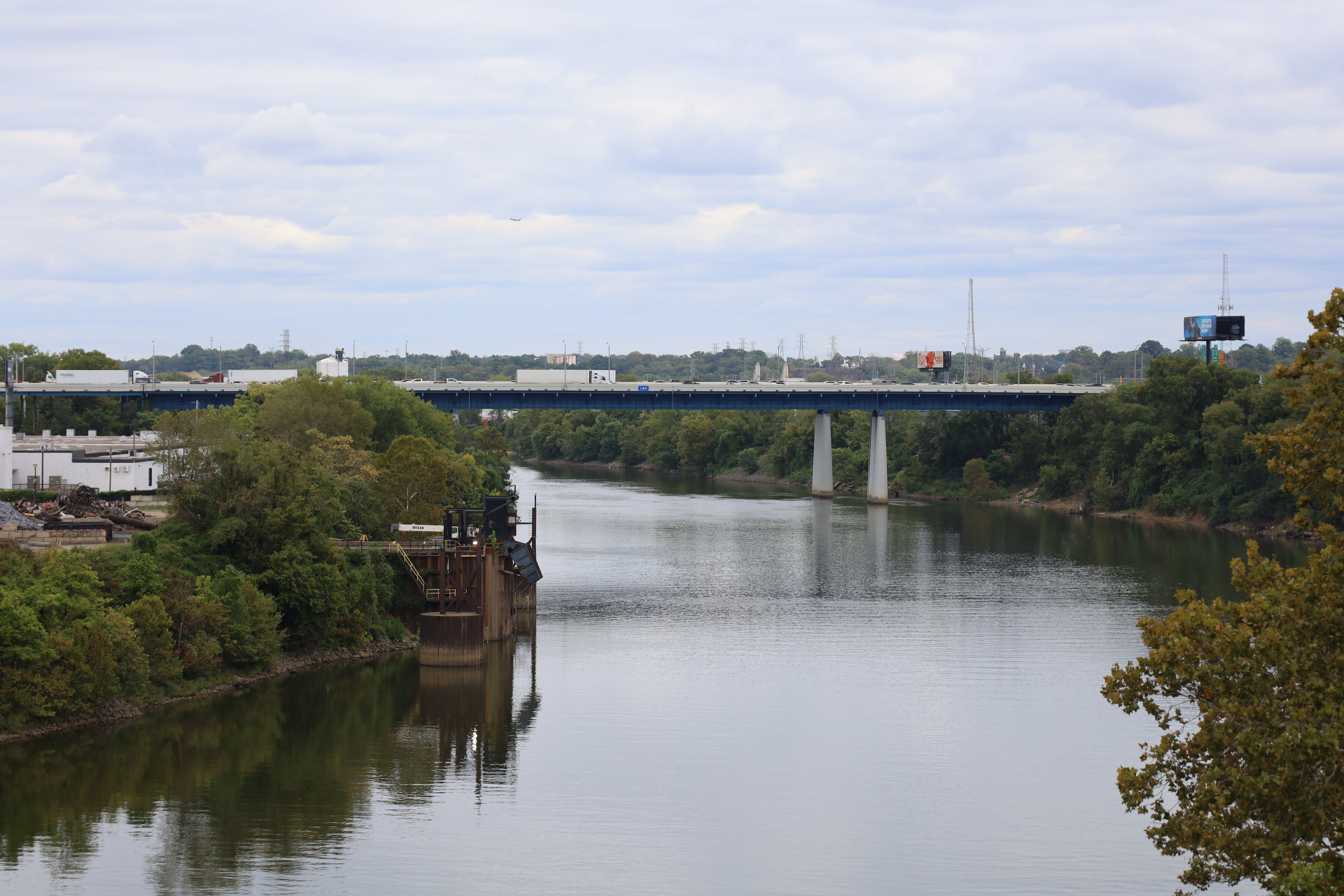
- The bridge in 2024
- Coordinates: 36.1590°N 86.7602°W
- Carries: 8 lanes of I-24
- Crosses: Cumberland River
- Locale: Nashville, Tennessee

Characteristics
- Design: Plate girder bridge
- Total length: 2,362 ft (720 m)

History
- Construction start: April 1960
- Construction end: January 14, 1964

Statistics
- Daily traffic: 146,579 (2025)

Location
- Interactive map of Silliman Evans Sr. Memorial Bridges

The Silliman Evans Sr. Memorial Bridges, most commonly referred to as the Silliman Evans Bridge, are a set of steel plate girder bridges which carry Interstate 24 across the Cumberland River in downtown Nashville, Tennessee. Until 2000, the bridges also carried Interstate 65. The bridges consist of two separate spans, which diverge into four separate spans at their southern end.

== Description ==
The Silliman Evans Bridge borders downtown Nashville directly to the southeast and is part of the loop of Interstate Highways that completely encircle downtown Nashville, known locally as the Downtown Loop. The southern portion of the bridges consists of four separate two-lane ramps that are part of an interchange between I-24 and I-40. One of these spans, the ramp carrying I-40 eastbound traffic to I-24 westbound, crosses over the span carrying I-24 eastbound traffic to I-24 and I-40 eastbound. These four ramps quickly converge into two separate spans, each carrying four lanes, which, over the course of the length, gradually merge closer. At the northern end of the bridges, the lanes become separated by a jersey barrier. While I-24 runs east to west, the Silliman Evans Bridge is aligned in almost an exact north-south direction. Directly southeast of the bridge, I-24 and I-40 begin a brief concurrency; southwest of the bridge, I-40 continues as part of the Downtown Loop. The bridges also cross US 70 (Hermitage Avenue) and a railroad at its south end, and two surface streets at its northern end.

== History ==
The Silliman Evans Bridge was the first major link in the Downtown Loop around Nashville to be constructed. It was originally planned to carry only I-65 until an extension of I-24 west of Nashville was approved in 1964. The bridge was named for an owner and publisher of The Nashville Tennessean, now The Tennessean, who held that position from 1937 until his death in 1955. Originally referred to as the "Wharf Avenue Bridge", work began in late April 1960, and the entire project cost approximately $7 million (equivalent to $54 million in 2024). The legislation naming the bridge was approved by the Tennessee General Assembly on March 16, 1961. In late December 1963, the eastern span opened, with east and westbound traffic routed together. On January 14, 1964, the western span opened in a ribbon-cutting ceremony attended by governor Frank G. Clement, Nashville mayor Beverly Briley, and Evans' widow. The approximately 3.2 miles (5.1 km) segment of I-24 between the bridge and the split with I-65 (then I-265) was also fully opened and dedicated in that ceremony.

For many years, the segment of I-24 and I-65 containing the Silliman Evans Bridge was the only complete portion of the Interstates encircling downtown Nashville. The portion of the loop northwest of downtown, where I-65 would eventually be rerouted, was not completed until March 15, 1971, and I-40 directly southwest of the Silliman Evans Bridge was not completed until March 3, 1972.

One of the worst traffic accidents in the state's history occurred on the Silliman Evans Bridge on the morning of July 27, 1973, when a sedan on the northbound span crashed through the bridge's guardrails, exited the roadway, and crashed into the ground about 100 feet (30 m) below, killing eight occupants and injuring one. The accident was investigated by the National Transportation Safety Board (NTSB), which named a number of unsafe design features of the bridge as contributors to the crash, and concluded that the state had been aware of the safety hazards of the bridge's rails prior to the accident.

TDOT widened both spans of the bridge from three to four lanes and added shoulders in a $10.6 million (equivalent to $47.8 million in 2024) project that completely closed the northbound span between January 20, 1974, and April 6, 1975, and the southbound span from April 6, 1975, to November 16, 1975.

In May 2000, I-65 was rerouted off of the Silliman Evans Bridge and onto the western loop around downtown Nashville, forming a new concurrency with I-40 and replacing a segment of freeway designated as I-265. This was done in an effort to reduce congestion on the bridge and along the east side of Nashville.
