= Chez =

Chez may refer to:

- Anthony Chez (1872–1937), American football, basketball, and baseball coach and college athletics administrator.
- Chez Reavie (born 1981), American golfer.
- CHEZ-FM, a Canadian radio station.
- Chez Melange, American restaurant.
- Chez Scheme, an implementation of the Scheme programming language.

== See also ==
- Ches (disambiguation)
- Shez (disambiguation)
- Cheese (disambiguation)
