= Shez (disambiguation) =

Shez is an Israeli writer, poet and playwright.

Shez may also refer to:

- She'z, a South Korean girl group
- Shez (son of Shez), a person from the Book of Mormon
- Shez, default name for the player's avatar in Fire Emblem Warriors: Three Hopes

== See also ==
- Chez (disambiguation)
- Shaz (disambiguation)
