= Shaz =

Shaz may refer to:

== Personal name ==
- Shaz Bennett, American writer, filmmaker, performance artist and film programmer.
- Shaz Khan, American Pakistani actor
- Rashid Shaz, Indian Islamic scholar, Writer, Activist and Professor of English
- Matthew Scharenberg, Australian rules football player
- Shaz, English musician, past member of Aeon Zen
- An alternate spelling of Shez, Israeli poet

== Fictional characters ==
- Shaz Granger, a fictional character in BBC One's Ashes to Ashes
- Shaz Wylie, a character in the television series Bad Girls

== Other ==
- A demon in the grimoire Ars Goetia
- Shaz Turkic, a taxon in some classifications of the Turkic languages

== See also ==
- Shez (disambiguation)
