= Pelham, Tennessee =

- Census-designated place
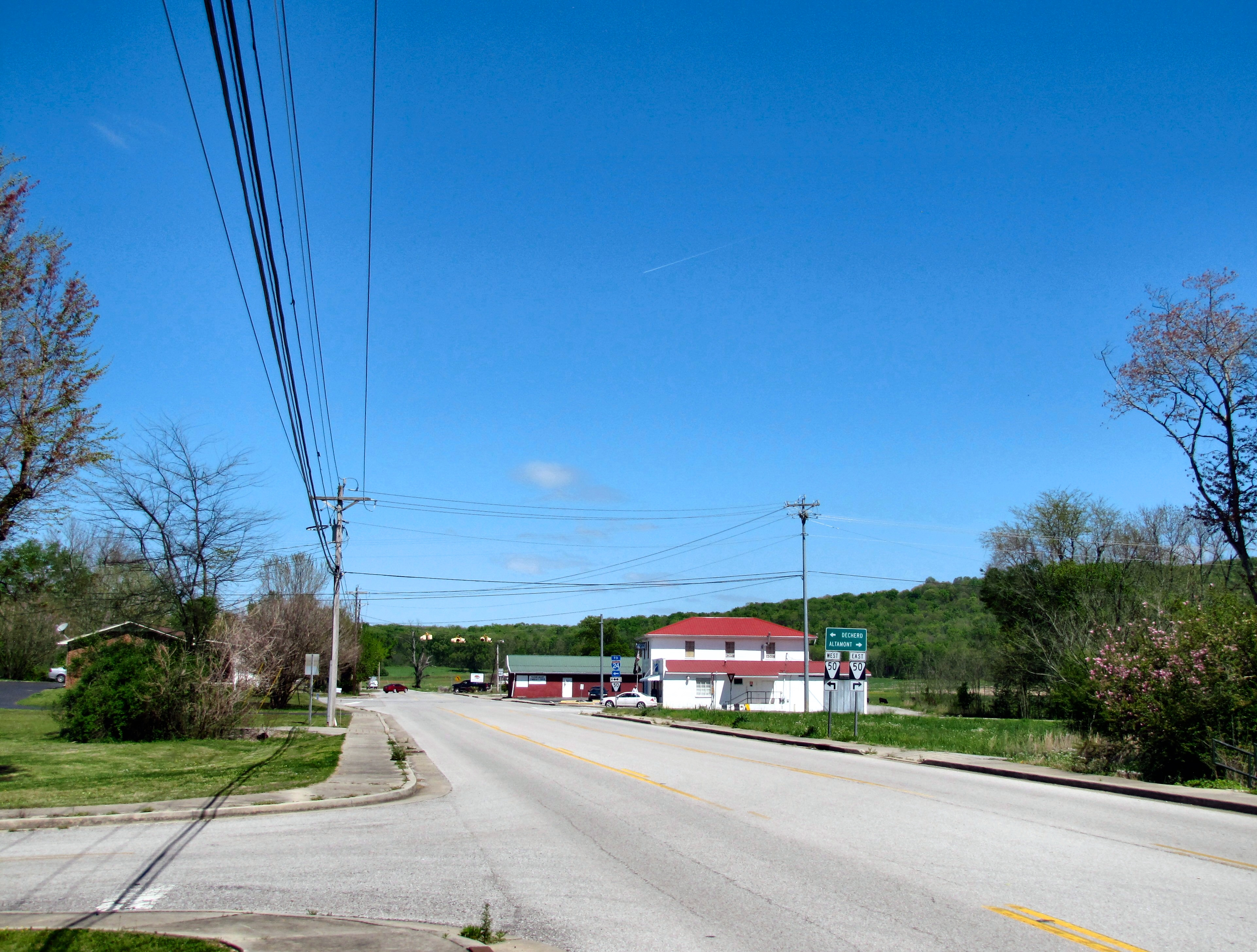

- Location within Tennessee Location within the United States
- Coordinates: 35°18′36″N 85°52′51″W
- Country: United States
- State: Tennessee
- County: Grundy

Area
  - Total: 16.64 sq mi (43.10 km^{2})
  - Land: 16.64 sq mi (43.10 km^{2})
  - Water: 0 sq mi (0.00 km^{2})
- Elevation: 1,024 ft (312 m)

Population (2020)
  - Total: 371
  - Density: 22.3/sq mi (8.61/km^{2})
- Time zone: UTC-6 (Central (CST))
  - Summer (DST): UTC-5 (CDT)
- ZIP code: 37366
- Area code: 931
- GNIS feature ID: 1297123

Pelham is an unincorporated community and census-designated place (CDP) in Grundy County, Tennessee, United States. As of the 2010 census, its population was 403. Pelham is located at the junction of U.S. Route 41, State Route 2, and State Route 50 near the base of the Cumberland Plateau, 5.35 miles (8.61 km) north-northwest of Monteagle. Pelham has a post office with ZIP code 37366, which opened on April 4, 1832.

The community is believed to have been named for a family of early settlers. There is a school in Pelham. It is Pelham Elementary school.

== Demographics ==
Historical population
Census	Pop.	Note	%±
2020	371		—
U.S. Decennial Census
