= Kimball, Tennessee =

- Town
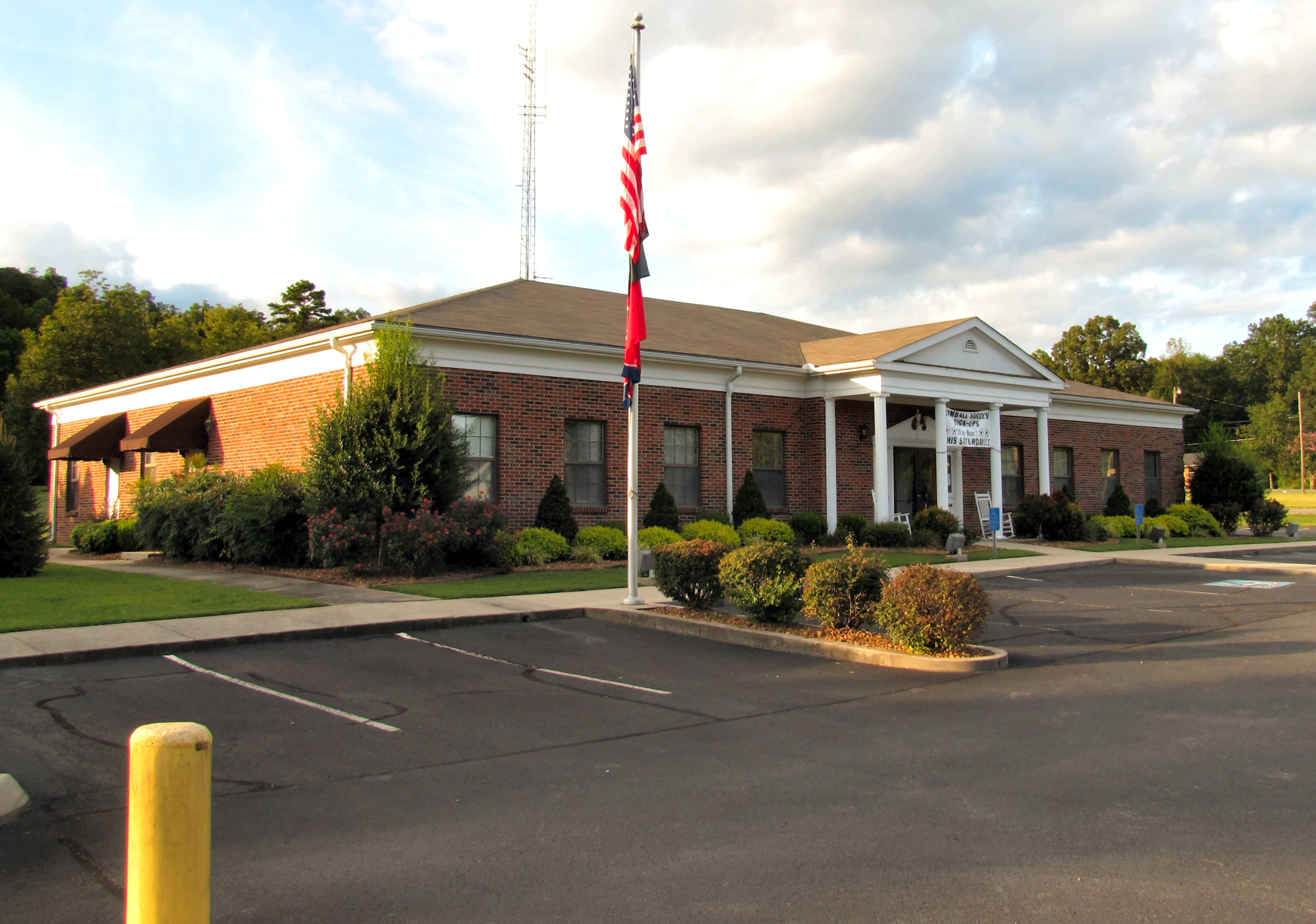
- Kimball Town Hall

- Location of Kimball in Marion County, Tennessee.
- Coordinates: 35°2′49″N 85°40′28″W
- Country: United States
- State: Tennessee
- County: Marion

Area
  - Total: 5.31 sq mi (13.76 km^{2})
  - Land: 5.31 sq mi (13.76 km^{2})
  - Water: 0 sq mi (0.00 km^{2})
- Elevation: 676 ft (206 m)

Population (2020)
  - Total: 1,545
  - Density: 290.9/sq mi (112.32/km^{2})
- Time zone: UTC-6 (Central (CST))
  - Summer (DST): UTC-5 (CDT)
- ZIP code: 37347
- Area code: 423
- FIPS code: 47-39400
- GNIS feature ID: 1314134
- Website: www.townofkimball.com

Kimball is a town in Marion County, Tennessee, United States. The population was 1,545 at the 2020 census and 1,395 in 2010. It is part of the Chattanooga, TN–GA Metropolitan Statistical Area.

== History ==
Kimball was founded in 1890 as a model industrial city by Hannibal Kimball, with support of the British Anglo-American Company, Limited. The location was chosen to be similar to another planned city, Colorado Springs. It was backed by mountains, with three miles of frontage on the Tennessee River and rail connections on the Nashville, Chattanooga and St. Louis Railway.

The town suffered damage after it was struck by an EF 2 tornado on November 14, 2007. The storm left nine injured, along a damage path of approximately two miles in length.

== Geography ==
Kimball is located at 35°2′49″N 85°40′28″W (35.046956, -85.674476).

According to the United States Census Bureau, the town has a total area of 4.9 square miles (13 km^{2}), all land.

== Demographics ==
Historical population
Census	Pop.	Note	%±
1970	807		—
1980	1,220		51.2%
1990	1,243		1.9%
2000	1,312		5.6%
2010	1,395		6.3%
2020	1,545		10.8%

=== 2020 census ===
Kimball racial composition
Race	Number	Percentage
White (non-Hispanic)	1,382	89.45%
Black or African American (non-Hispanic)	23	1.49%
Native American	2	0.13%
Asian	23	1.49%
Pacific Islander	1	0.06%
Other/Mixed	55	3.56%
Hispanic or Latino	59	3.82%

As of the 2020 United States census, there were 1,545 people, 683 households, and 526 families residing in the town.

=== 2000 census ===
As of the census of 2000, there were 1,312 people, 563 households, and 389 families residing in the town. The population density was 265.6 inhabitants per square mile (102.5/km^{2}). There were 607 housing units at an average density of 122.9 per square mile (47.5/km^{2}). The racial makeup of the town was 97.48% White, 0.99% African American, 0.53% Native American, and 0.99% from two or more races. Hispanic or Latino of any race were 0.08% of the population.

There were 563 households, out of which 30.0% had children under the age of 18 living with them, 54.7% were married couples living together, 10.8% had a female householder with no husband present, and 30.9% were non-families. 29.1% of all households were made up of individuals, and 11.4% had someone living alone who was 65 years of age or older. The average household size was 2.33 and the average family size was 2.85.

The town's population was spread out, with 22.8% under the age of 18, 7.0% from 18 to 24, 29.0% from 25 to 44, 28.6% from 45 to 64, and 12.6% who were 65 years of age or older. The median age was 40 years. For every 100 females, there were 92.1 males. For every 100 females age 18 and over, there were 86.6 males.

The median income for a household in the town was $33,359, and the median income for a family was $41,094. Males had a median income of $31,141 versus $21,382 for females. The per capita income for the town was $17,454. About 7.9% of families and 9.0% of the population were below the poverty line, including 10.0% of those under age 18 and 8.4% of those age 65 or over.

== Education ==
Kimball is home to a satellite campus of Chattanooga State Community College.
