= Tennessee House of Representatives 22nd district =

State legislative district in Tennessee

Tennessee's 22nd State House of Representatives district
- Map of Tennessee House districts with the 22nd District shaded in red
Representative
Dan Howell; R–Cleveland
since 2013
- Demographics: 90.2% White; 1.4% Black; 2.6% Hispanic; 0.4% Asian; 5% Multiracial
- Population (2024): 71,484

The Tennessee House of Representatives 22nd district is one of the 99 legislative districts in the lower house of the Tennessee General Assembly. The district is located in East Tennessee and covers Meigs, Polk, and part of Bradley counties. The district includes Decatur, Charleston, Benton, Ducktown, and Copperhill. The rest of the district is unincorporated and mostly rural. Dan Howell has represented the district since 2013.

== Demographics ==
The Tennessee Comptroller estimates the population as of 2024 at 71,484.

- 90.2% of the district is White
- 2.6% of the district is Hispanic
- 1.4% of the district is Black
- 0.4% of the district is Asian
- 5% of the district is Two or more races

Detailed demographic information is also available through Census Reporter.

== History ==
The 88th Tennessee General Assembly was the first in which all districts were numbered. At this time, the 22nd district was in McMinn, Monroe and Polk counties. From the 94th-97th GAs, it was composed of Monroe, Bradley, and Polk counties. During the 98th GA, it was composed of Bradley, Meigs, and Polk counties. From the 99th-100th GAs, it was in Polk County. Since the 101st General Assembly it has been composed of Meigs, Polk, and part of Bradley counties.

== List of Representatives ==
Representative	Party	Years of Service	General Assembly	Hometown
Dan Howell	Republican	2013-present	108th-114th	Cleveland
Eric Watson	Republican	2005-2012	104th-107th	Cleveland
J. Chris Newton	Republican	1995-2004	99th-103rd	Cleveland
Richard A. Fisher	Democratic	1993-1994	98th	Cleveland
Bob E. Harrill	Republican	1979-1992	91st-97th	Madisonville
William C. Watson	Democratic	1969-1978	86th-90th	Madisonville
