= Benton Springs =

Benton Springs may refer to:

- Benton Springs, Tennessee, an unincorporated community
- Benton Springs Fault, a geological fault in Nevada

== See also ==
- Benton Hot Springs, California
