= National Register of Historic Places listings in Polk County, Tennessee =

Location of Polk County in Tennessee

This is a list of the National Register of Historic Places listings in Polk County, Tennessee.

This is intended to be a complete list of the properties and districts on the National Register of Historic Places in Polk County, Tennessee, United States. Latitude and longitude coordinates are provided for many National Register properties and districts; these locations may be seen together in a map.

There are 18 properties and districts listed on the National Register in the county.

Contents: Counties in Tennessee
Anderson – Bedford – Benton – Bledsoe – Blount – Bradley – Campbell – Cannon – Carroll – Carter – Cheatham – Chester – Claiborne – Clay – Cocke – Coffee – Crockett – Cumberland – Davidson – Decatur – DeKalb – Dickson – Dyer – Fayette – Fentress – Franklin – Gibson – Giles – Grainger – Greene – Grundy – Hamblen – Hamilton – Hancock – Hardeman – Hardin – Hawkins – Haywood – Henderson – Henry – Hickman – Houston – Humphreys – Jackson – Jefferson – Johnson – Knox – Lake – Lauderdale – Lawrence – Lewis – Lincoln – Loudon – Macon – Madison – Marion – Marshall – Maury – McMinn – McNairy – Meigs – Monroe – Montgomery – Moore – Morgan – Obion – Overton – Perry – Pickett – Polk – Putnam – Rhea – Roane – Robertson – Rutherford – Scott – Sequatchie – Sevier – Shelby – Smith – Stewart – Sullivan – Sumner – Tipton – Trousdale – Unicoi – Union – Van Buren – Warren – Washington – Wayne – Weakley – White – Williamson – Wilson

This National Park Service list is complete through NPS recent listings posted January 23, 2026.

== Current listings ==
	Name on the Register	Image	Date listed	Location	City or town	Description
1	Burra Burra Mine Historic District	Burra Burra Mine Historic District	March 17, 1983 (#83003059)	State Route 68 and Burra St. 35°02′07″N 84°22′46″W	Ducktown	
2	Buzzard's Roost Historic District	Buzzard's Roost Historic District	May 15, 1992 (#92000451)	301-400 College, 420-430 Ell and 129-186 Main Sts., 400-415 School House Rd., and 211 and 215 State Route 68; 35°01′59″N 84°23′04″W	Ducktown	
3	Center & Abernathy Store Building	Center & Abernathy Store Building	September 2, 1992 (#92001071)	23-33 Ocoee St. 34°59′18″N 84°22′16″W	Copperhill	
4	Central Headframe		September 2, 1992 (#92001073)	State Route 68 south of its junction with U.S. Routes 64/74; 35°01′16″N 84°22′55″W	Ducktown	
5	Copeland House	Copeland House	April 5, 1984 (#84003674)	Cookson Creek Rd. 35°05′04″N 84°40′10″W	Parksville	
6	Copperhill Historic District	Copperhill Historic District	May 15, 1992 (#92000449)	Roughly bounded by Hill, Prospect, Main, and Riverview Sts. Boundary increase (listed July 16, 2008, refnum 08000688): Roughly bounded by Depaul St., Depot St., and Main St. 34°59′22″N 84°22′10″W	Copperhill	
7	Ducktown Historic District	Ducktown Historic District	May 15, 1992 (#92000450)	Roughly bounded by State Route 68 and an alley 2 blocks northwest of Main St. 35°02′13″N 84°22′55″W	Ducktown	
8	Isabella Managers' Row		May 15, 1992 (#92000448)	Ducktown-Isabella Rd. north of U.S. Route 64; 35°01′28″N 84°21′37″W	Isabella	
9	Kimsey Junior College	Kimsey Junior College	September 2, 1992 (#92001072)	244 State Route 68; 35°03′02″N 84°23′20″W	Ducktown	
10	Knoxville Southern Railroad Historic District	Knoxville Southern Railroad Historic District	March 21, 2007 (#07000187)	Former Knoxville Southern railroad line from near Reliance to near Farner; 35°10′29″N 84°23′53″W	Reliance vicinity	
11	Newtown Historic District	Newtown Historic District	May 15, 1992 (#92000452)	510-521 1st, 538-730 2nd, and 580-730 3rd Sts. 34°59′36″N 84°22′15″W	Copperhill	
12	Ocoee No. 1 Hydroelectric Station	Ocoee No. 1 Hydroelectric Station	July 5, 1990 (#90001003)	Junction of U.S. Route 64 and the Ocoee River; 35°05′40″N 84°38′52″W	Parksville	
13	Ocoee Hydroelectric Plant No. 2	Ocoee Hydroelectric Plant No. 2	October 31, 1979 (#79002453)	U.S. Route 64; 35°04′58″N 84°29′28″W	Ocoee vicinity	
14	Ocoee No. 3 Hydroelectric Project	Ocoee No. 3 Hydroelectric Project	August 14, 2017 (#100001473)	1988 US 64; 35°02′26″N 84°28′00″W	Benton vicinity	
15	Polk County Courthouse	Polk County Courthouse	June 24, 1993 (#93000562)	Bounded by U.S. Route 411 and Ward, Commerce, and Main Sts. 35°10′24″N 84°39′12″W	Benton	
16	Reliance Historic District	Reliance Historic District	March 13, 1986 (#86000350)	Roughly bounded by New Reliance and Power House Rds., State Route 30, and the Hiwassee River; 35°11′23″N 84°30′08″W	Reliance	
17	Nancy Ward Tomb	Nancy Ward Tomb	April 11, 1973 (#73001815)	South of Benton on U.S. Route 411; 35°09′51″N 84°40′50″W	Benton vicinity	
18	William Wiggins House	William Wiggins House	December 2, 1993 (#93001355)	Northeastern corner of the junction of Main and Ward Sts. 35°10′26″N 84°39′12″W	Benton	

== See also ==
- List of National Historic Landmarks in Tennessee
- National Register of Historic Places listings in Tennessee
