= Chilhowee =

Chilhowee has a number of meanings:

- Chilhowee (Cherokee town), an ancient Cherokee village in Blount County and Monroe County, Tennessee
- Chilhowee Dam, a reservoir and dam development project in Tennessee
- Chilhowee Gliderport, privately owned public-use airport
- Chilhowee Group, a rock formation
- Chilhowee Mountain
- Chilhowee, Missouri, a town
- Chilhowee Park, a park in Knoxville, Tennessee
- Chilhowee Park (neighborhood), a neighborhood in Knoxville, Tennessee
- Chilhowie, Virginia, a town
