= Polk County =

Polk County is the name of twelve counties in the United States, all except two named after president of the United States James Knox Polk:

- Polk County, Arkansas
- Polk County, Florida
- Polk County, Georgia
- Polk County, Iowa, containing Des Moines, the state capital.
- Polk County, Minnesota
- Polk County, Missouri, named after Col. Ezekiel Polk who fought in the American Revolutionary War (grandfather of James K. Polk)
- Polk County, Nebraska
- Polk County, North Carolina, named after Col. William Polk who fought in the American Revolutionary War (first cousin once-removed of James K. Polk)
- Polk County, Oregon
- Polk County, Tennessee
- Polk County, Texas
- Polk County, Wisconsin

== Other uses ==
- Polk County, a play by Zora Neale Hurston

== See also ==
- Polk County Courthouse (disambiguation)
