= Polk County Courthouse (Tennessee) =

- U.S. National Register of Historic Places
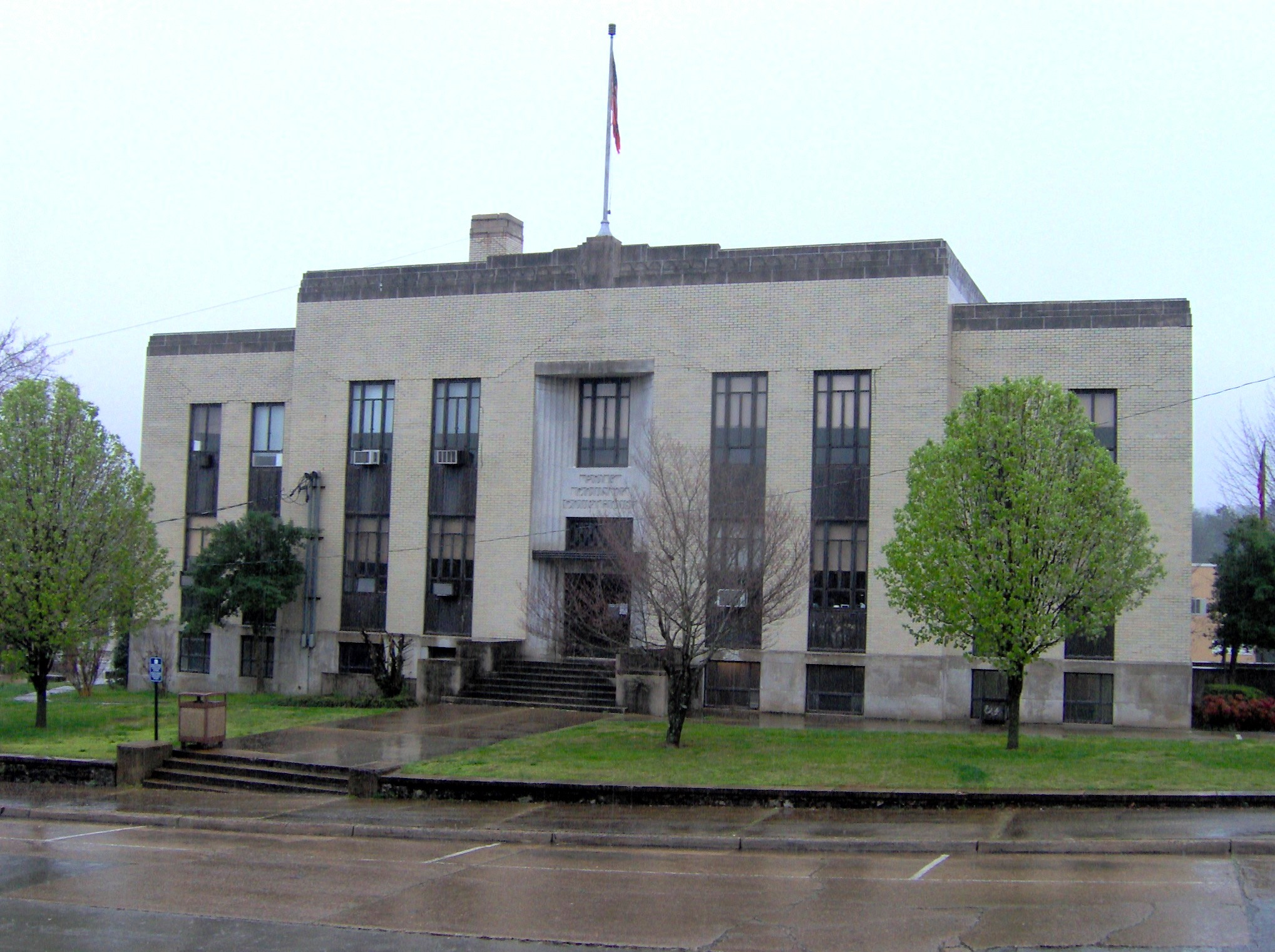

- Location within Tennessee Location within the United States
- Interactive map showing the location of Polk County Courthouse
- Location: Bounded by US 411 and Ward, Commerce and Main Streets, Benton, Tennessee
- Coordinates: 35°10′24″N 84°39′12″W
- Area: less than one acre
- Built: 1937
- Architect: R. H. Hunt & Co.
- Architectural style: Art Deco
- NRHP reference No.: 93000562
- Added to NRHP: June 24, 1993

The Polk County Courthouse is a historic building in Benton, Tennessee. It serves as the courthouse for Polk County, Tennessee.

Three courthouses were built for Polk County before this one. The first one was built in 1840, the second one in 1851, the third one in 1897. The fourth and current courthouse was built in 1937.

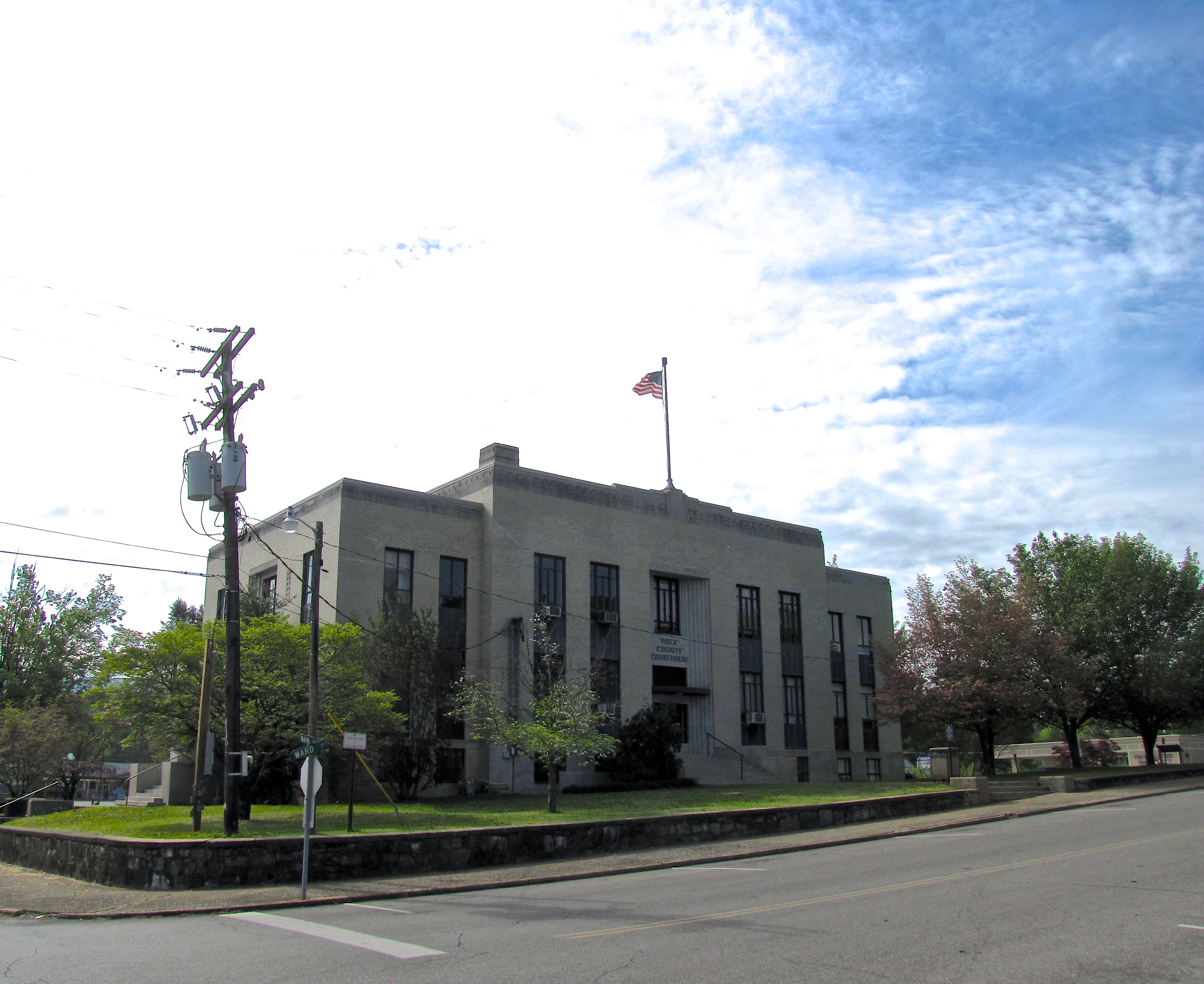
Polk County Courthouse in Benton

The building was designed in the Art Deco architectural style by R. H. Hunt & Co. It has been listed on the National Register of Historic Places since June 24, 1993.
