= Eric Watson (politician) =

American politician (born 1973)

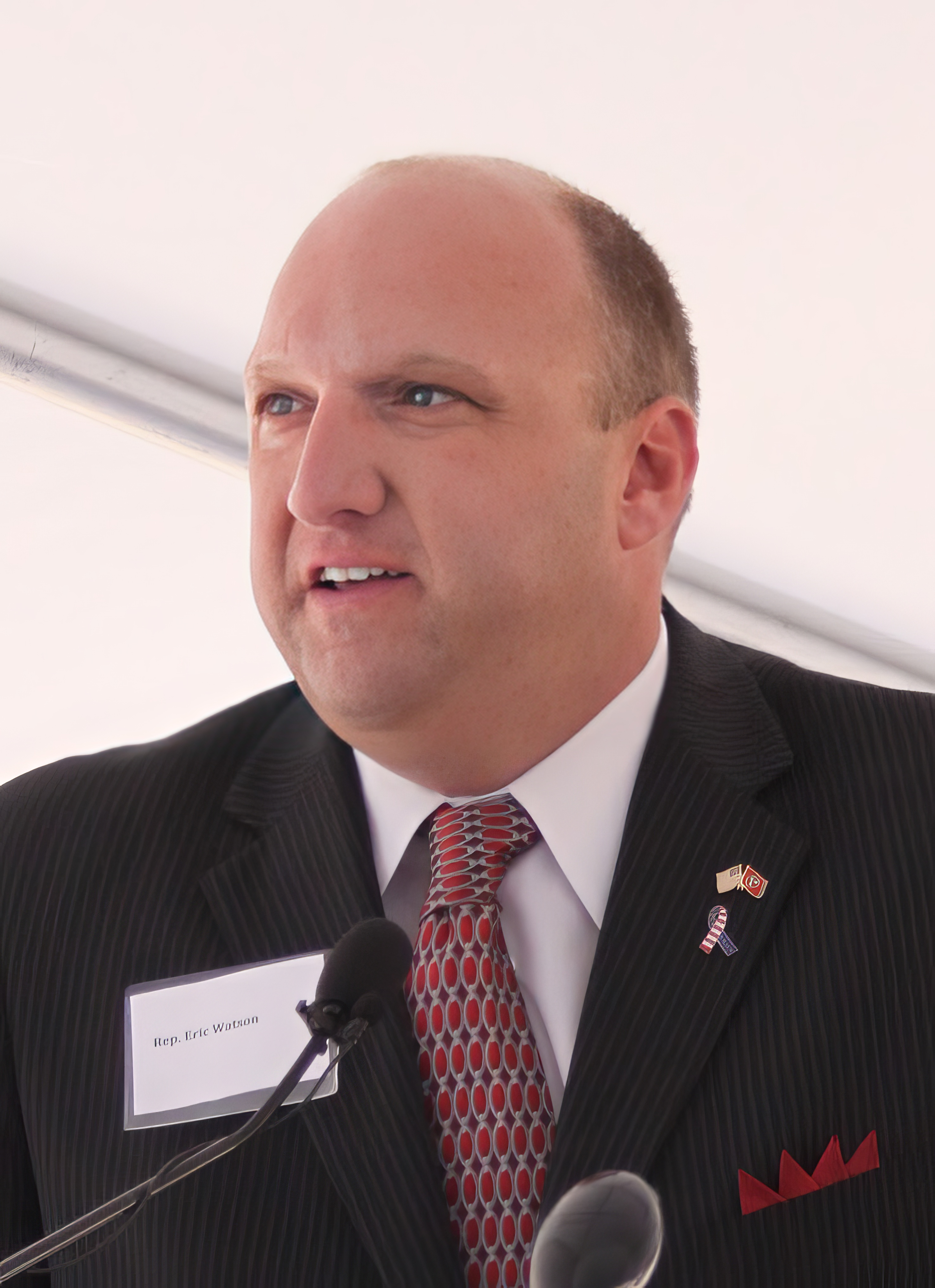

Member of the Tennessee House of Representatives from the 22nd district
- In office January 2006 – August 2014
- Preceded by: J. Chris Newton
- Succeeded by: Dan Howell

Sheriff of Bradley County
- In office September 2014 – September 2018
- Preceded by: Jim Ruth
- Succeeded by: Steve Lawson

Personal details
- Born: September 14, 1973 (age 53) Cleveland, Tennessee
- Party: Republican
- Education: Tennessee Law Enforcement Training Academy; University of Tennessee at Martin; Andersonville Theological Seminary (B.A.), (M.A.)
- Profession: Police officer

Thomas Eric Watson (born September 14, 1973) is an American politician and police officer from Cleveland, Tennessee. From 2006 to 2014, he was a Republican member of the Tennessee House of Representatives for the 22nd district, encompassing Cleveland, Meigs County, Polk County, and parts of Bradley County. Watson served one term as sheriff of Bradley County from September 2014 to September 2018.

== Biography ==
Eric Watson was born on September 14, 1973. He graduated from the Tennessee Law Enforcement Training Academy, and received a B.A. and M.A. from Andersonville Theological Seminary in Camilla, Georgia. He also studied at the University of Tennessee at Martin.

Watson worked as a deputy sheriff for the Marion County Sheriff's Office from 1995 to 1998. He joined the Bradley County Sheriff's Office in 1999 as a deputy. He resigned in October 2011 after concerns were raised over inappropriate use of his time, according to a spokesperson for the department. However, a day prior, Watson expressed in a press release that he was resigning to help with his family business due to his father being in a serious accident. He also worked as an officer for the Tennessee Wildlife Resources Agency from 2000 to 2005 and as a reserve volunteer detective for the Benton Police Department.

Watson was first elected to the Tennessee House of Representatives in special election in January 2006 to replace Chris Newton, who resigned as part of Operation Tennessee Waltz. He was re-elected four times. He was an at-large representative at the 2008 Republican National Convention. In 2010, he received the Legislator of the Year by the County Officials Association of Tennessee. In November 2011, Speaker Beth Harwell appointed him to the Tennessee Criminal Justice Coordinating Council. On October 5, 2013, he announced his intentions to run for sheriff of Bradley County. He was elected in 2014, defeating incumbent Jim Ruth, and resigned from the Tennessee House the following August, upon taking office. In 2018, he ran for reelection, and lost to challenger Steve Lawson by 1,175 votes. He was succeeded by Lawson in September 2018.

== Controversy ==
During a rally on June 8, 2006 at the Hamilton County Courthouse promoting the Tennessee Marriage Protection Amendment, which banned same sex marriage, Watson said "It’ll be a sad day when queers and lesbians are allowed to get married... and kiss in front of the courthouse." After receiving much criticism and condemnation for his use of the word "queer," Watson refused to apologize, claiming that he believed that "queer" was an appropriate and commonly used term for homosexuals.

In June 2016, Bradley County Commissioner Dan Rawls handed over allegations and evidence of alleged improper and deceptive practices by Watson to the 10th Judicial District Attorney General Steve Crump's office, the Tennessee Bureau of Investigation (TBI), the FBI, and the U.S. Attorney's Office. Allegations of misconduct included the selling of a county owned surveillance van to a Nashville bail bondsman underpriced, using his patrol vehicle to transport his wife to the county jail to write bonds for prisoners, assigning deputies to investigate the activities of his wife's bail bonding coworkers, and abuse of county credit cards and funds.

In late 2016, the Tennessee Department of Revenue began investigating claims that Watson's side used car sales exceeded the legal limit. In Tennessee, a dealer's license is required to sell more than five motor vehicles per year, and Watson had a salesman's license. In July 2017, Watson was arrested and charged with six felony counts of altering and falsifying the titles of six vehicles. His charges were dismissed in January 2018.

== Personal life ==
Watson is a member of Fraternal Order of Police, National Rifle Association, Southern Gospel Music Association, Cleveland/Bradley Co. Economic Development Council, and Keep America Beautiful Council.
