= Tennessee State Route 123 =

Highway in Tennessee

State Route 123
- Saw Mill Road
- SR 123 highlighted in red

Route information
- Maintained by TDOT
- Length: 1.3 mi (2.1 km)

Major junctions
- West end: SR 68 near Turtletown
- East end: NC 294 at the NC state line near Turtletown

Location
- Country: United States
- State: Tennessee
- Counties: Polk

Highway system
- Tennessee State Routes; Interstate; US; State
← SR 122	→ I-124

State Route 123 (SR 123) is a short state route in the U.S. state of Tennessee. It serves to link SR 68 with NC 294, at the Tennessee/North Carolina state line.

== Route description ==
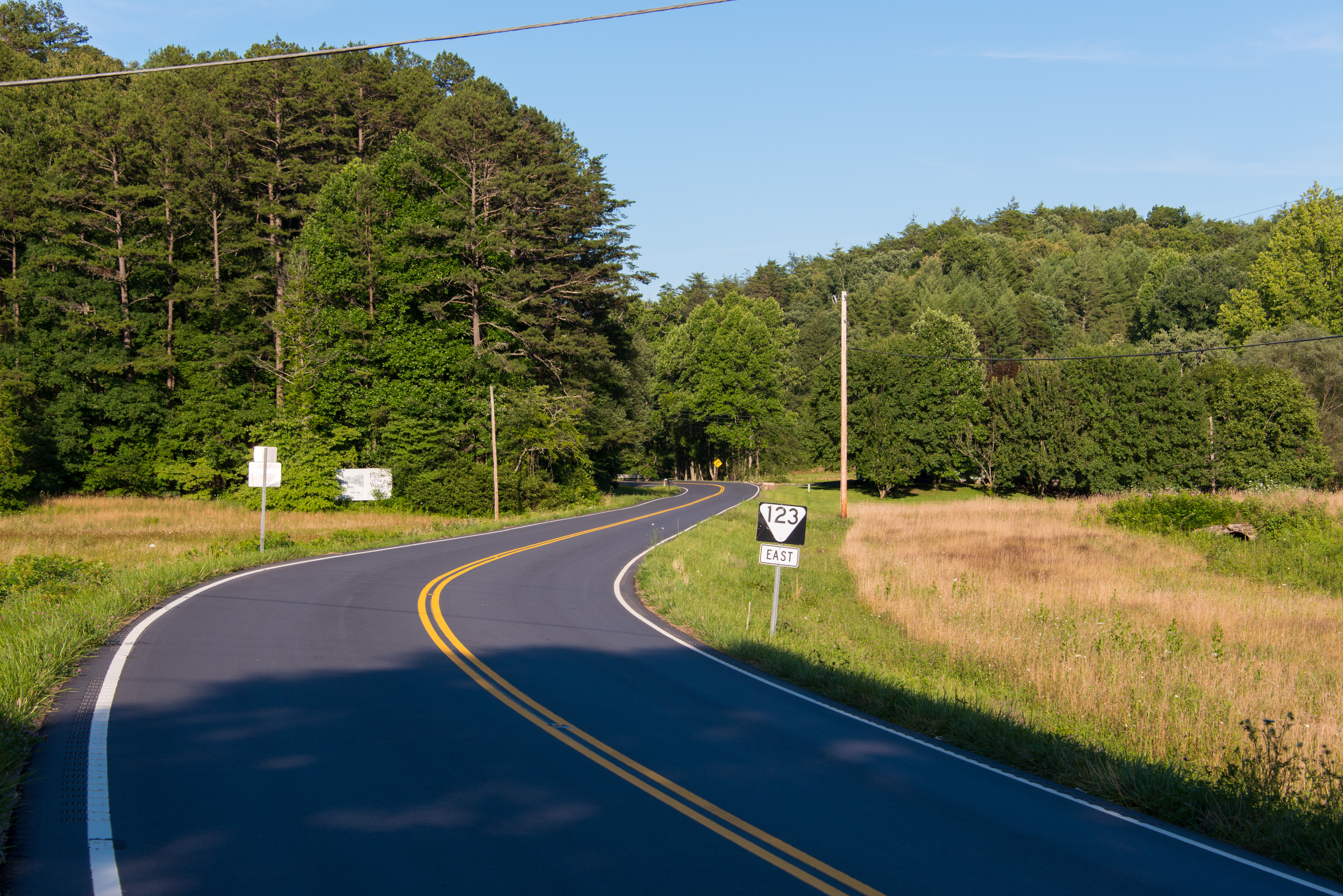
SR 123 towards North Carolina

SR 123 is a short 1.3-mile (2.1 km) highway entirely in Polk County and Cherokee National Forest. As a two-lane road throughout and no shoulders, it serves primarily as a link, with NC 294, to connect travelers from Turtletown and Farner, in Tennessee, to Murphy and the Hiwassee Dam, in North Carolina.

== History ==
SR 123 was known for many years as the shortest state route in the entire state of Tennessee until 2007, when it was surpassed by SR 448 (North Parkway), at 0.6 miles (0.97 km) in Sevierville.

== Junction list ==
The entire route is in Polk County.

Location	mi	km	Destinations	Notes
	0.0	0.0	SR 68 – Ducktown, Farner, Tellico Plains	
	1.3	2.1	NC 294 east – Hiwassee Dam	Continuation beyond North Carolina state line
1.000 mi = 1.609 km; 1.000 km = 0.621 mi
