= Copeland House (Parksville, Tennessee) =

- U.S. National Register of Historic Places
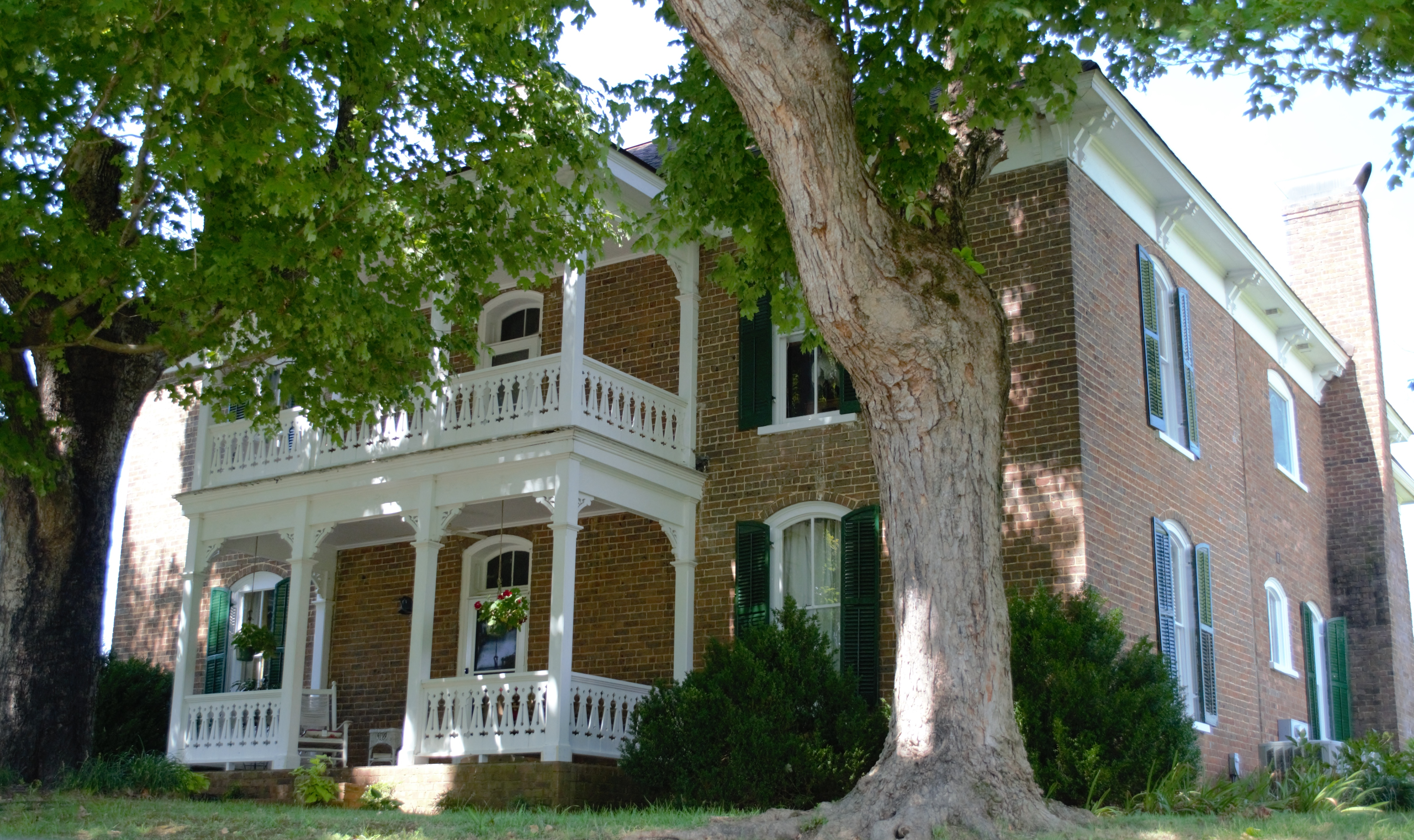

- Location within Tennessee Location within the United States
- Nearest city: Parksville, Tennessee
- Coordinates: 35°05′04″N 84°40′10″W
- Area: 1 acre (0.40 ha)
- Built: 1869
- Architectural style: Italianate
- NRHP reference No.: 84003674
- Added to NRHP: April 5, 1984

The Copeland House, also known as the Winston Cloud House, is a historic house in Polk County, Tennessee near Parksville.

== History ==
The house was built in 1869 for Dr. Warren Jones Copeland, his wife Onie McClary Pendergrass, the widow of Dr. N. Pendergrass, and their children. Copeland was a physician and Master Mason who served in the Tennessee General Assembly in 1865. It remained in the Copeland family until 1936 when his son, Flint Da Costa Copeland, sold it to Winston Cloud, a farmer.

As of 1983, the house and its setting, on the edge of the Great Smoky Mountains, were much as they were one hundred years before. It was deemed to be "an excellent example of an old homestead from the post-[Civil-]war period."

== Architectural significance ==
The house was designed in the Italianate architectural style. It has been listed on the National Register of Historic Places since April 5, 1984.
