= Martin Campbell Field =

Airport in Tennessee, United States

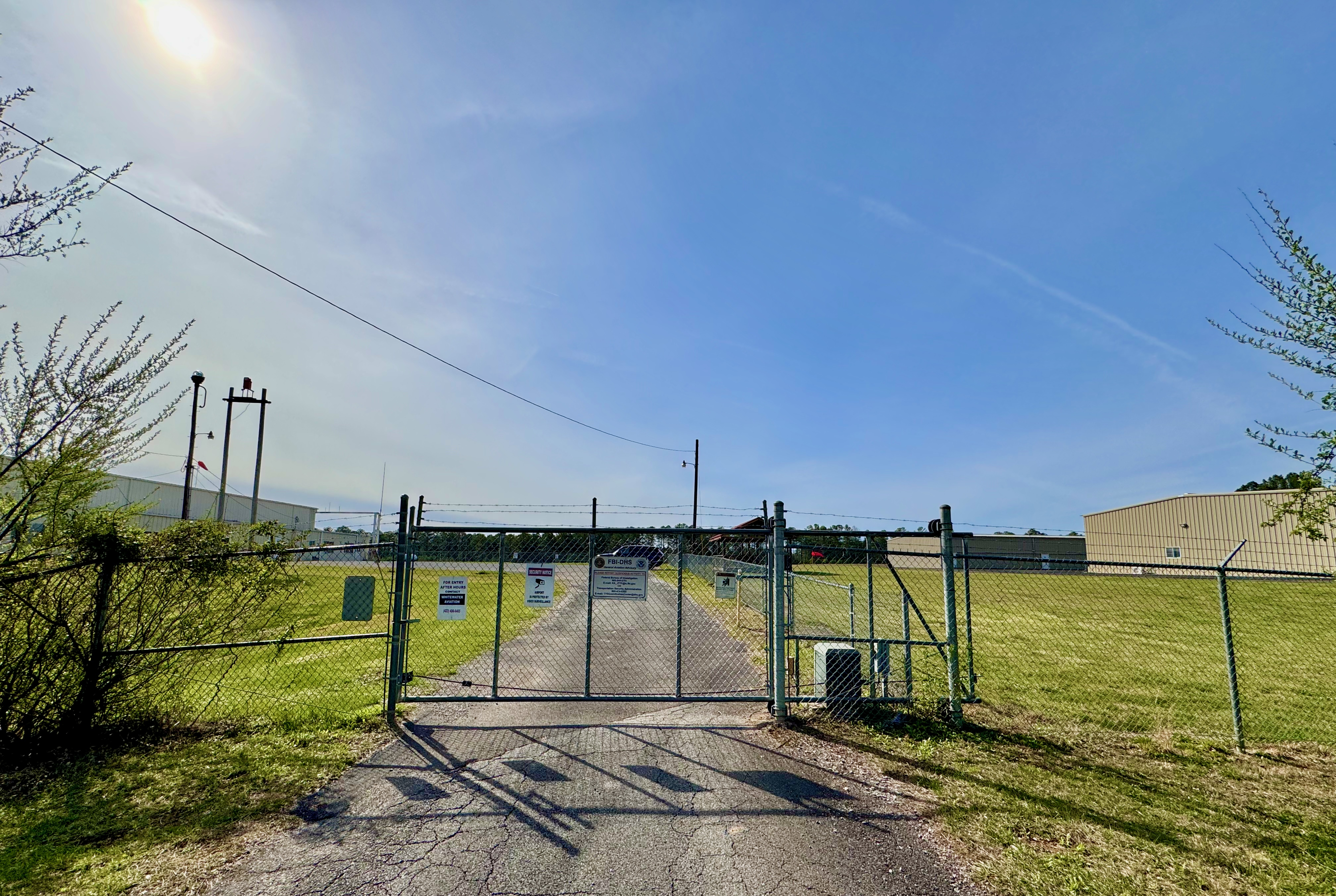
- IATA: none; ICAO: none; FAA LID: 1A3

Summary
- Owner: Polk County, Tennessee
- Serves: Copperhill, Tennessee, Ducktown, Tennessee
- Location: 971 Airport Road; Copperhill, Tennessee 37317
- Opened: December 1946
- Time zone: Eastern ()
- Elevation AMSL: 545 m / 1,789 ft
- Coordinates: 35°00′56″N 84°20′49″W

Map
- Location of airport in Tennessee 1A3 (the United States)

Runways
Direction	Length		Surface
Direction	m	ft	Surface
2/20	1,066.8	3,500	Asphalt
- Statistics:Martin Campbell Field

Martin Campbell Field is a general aviation airport located near Copperhill, Tennessee. It serves the Copper Basin region in which it is located, as well as the entirety of Polk County and surrounding areas.

== Facilities and aircraft ==
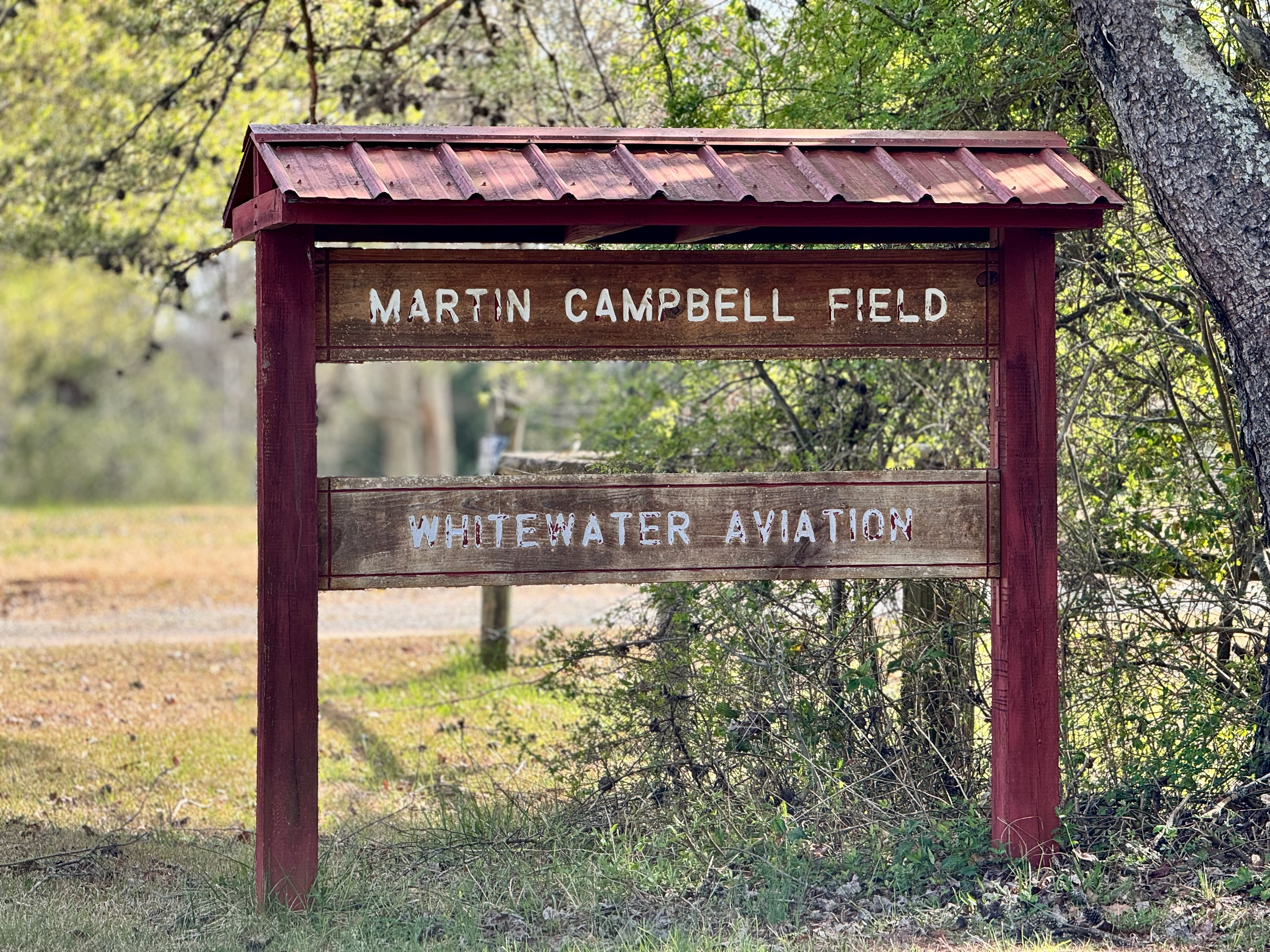
Martin Campbell Field airport

Martin Campbell Field consists of a 3,500 ft x 75 ft asphalt runway. The airport is located of a total of 59 acres of land approximately 3 miles (4.8 km) northeast of Copperhill, and is also located near Ducktown. Martin Campbell Field was established in December 1946.

== See also ==
- List of airports in Tennessee
- Chilhowee Gliderport
