= William Wiggins House =

- U.S. National Register of Historic Places
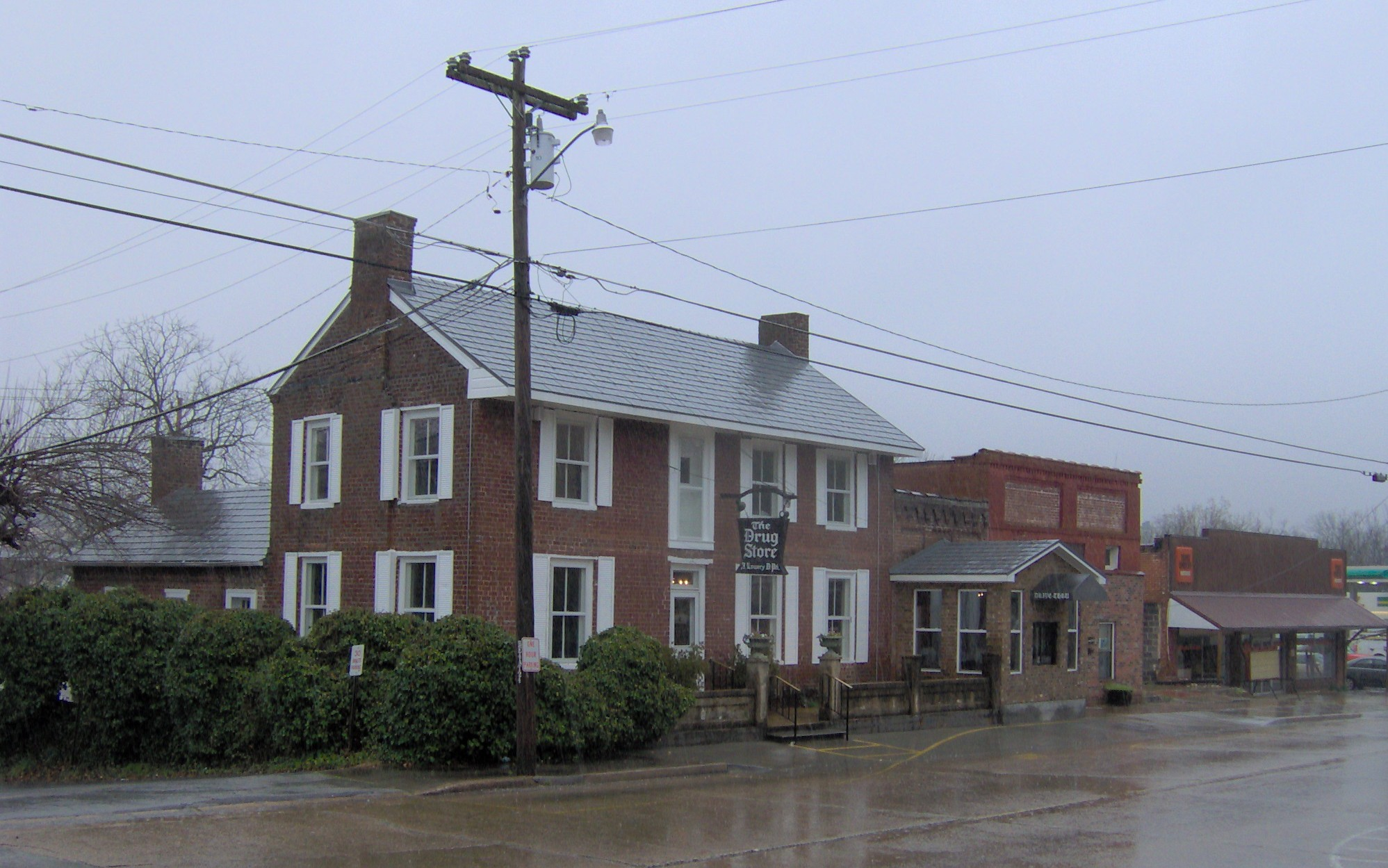

- Location within Tennessee Location within the United States
- Location: Junction of Main and Ward Streets, NE corner, Benton, Tennessee
- Coordinates: 35°10′26″N 84°39′12″W
- Area: less than one acre
- Built: 1840
- NRHP reference No.: 93001355
- Added to NRHP: December 2, 1993

The William Wiggins House, also known as the Dr. J. D. Nichols House, is a historic house in Benton, Tennessee, U.S.. It was built in the 1840s for William Wiggins, a justice of the peace. It was one of the few houses in the county built with bricks as opposed to timber at the time. It was owned by Dr. J. D. Nichols from 1905 to 1930. It has been listed on the National Register of Historic Places since December 2, 1993.
