= Polk County Courthouse =

Polk County Courthouse may refer to:

- Polk County Courthouse (Arkansas), Mena, Arkansas
- Old Polk County Courthouse (Florida), Bartow, Florida
- Polk County Courthouse (Iowa), Des Moines, Iowa
- Polk County Courthouse (Nebraska), Osceola, Nebraska
- Polk County Courthouse (North Carolina), Columbus, North Carolina
- Polk County Courthouse (Tennessee), Benton, Tennessee
- Polk County Courthouse and 1905 Courthouse Annex, Livingston, Texas
- Polk County Courthouse (Wisconsin), Balsam Lake, Wisconsin
- Geiger Building (Osceola, Wisconsin), also known as the Old Polk County Courthouse, listed on the National Register of Historic Places

== See also ==
- Polk County (disambiguation)
