= Dan Howell (politician) =

American politician

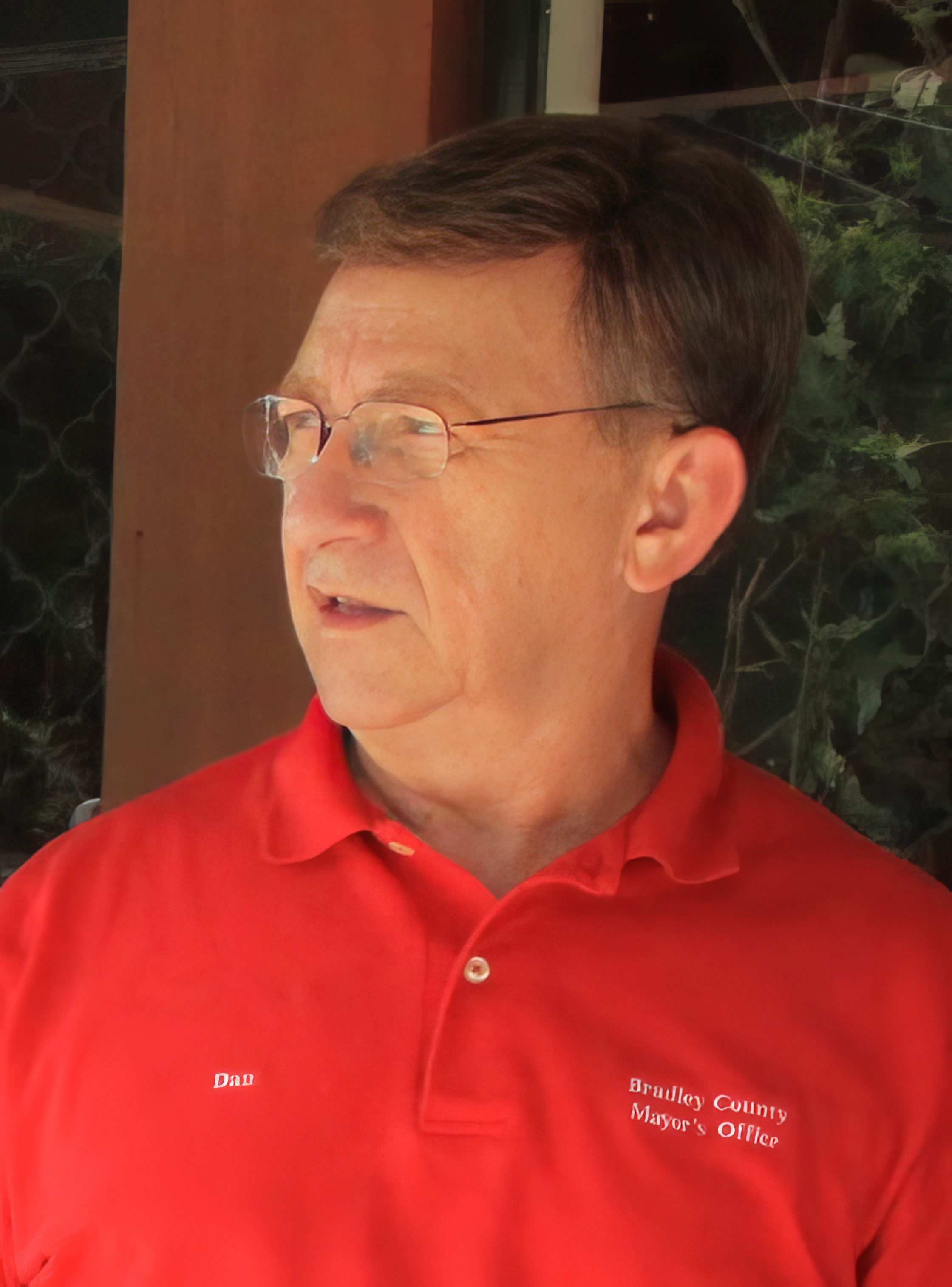

Member of the Tennessee House of Representatives from the 22nd district
- Incumbent
- Assumed office September 2013
- Preceded by: Eric Watson

Personal details
- Born: Gilmore, Arkansas, U.S.
- Party: Republican
- Spouse: Married
- Children: 3
- Website: http://www.capitol.tn.gov/house/members/h22.html

Dan Howell is an American politician from Cleveland, Tennessee. Since 2013, he has served as a member of the Tennessee House of Representatives for the 22nd district. He is a member of the Republican Party.

== Biography ==
Howell first moved to Cleveland in 1971, a while after graduating from Radio Engineering Institute in Kansas City, Missouri. He briefly attended Lee University. Prior to his political career, he was an anchor for WDEF-TV and a senior anchor and managing editor for WDSI-TV in Chattanooga, Tennessee.

Howell's professional experience includes working as the Executive Assistant to the Mayor of Bradley County, serving on the Bradley County Chamber of Commerce Board, the board for the Cleveland/Bradley County Greenway, the Storm Water Advisory Board, and the Salvation Army of Cleveland advisory board. He also served on the Tennessee Republican Party State Executive Committee.

Howell first announced his campaign for the house in November 2013. Howell won the August 2014 Republican Primary against J. Adam Lowe by 13 percentage points after incumbent Representative Eric Watson decided to run for Bradley County Sheriff. Howell was first elected to the Tennessee House of Representatives District 22, running unopposed in the November 2014 general election. Howell was re-elected in 2016, 2018, & 2020. District 22 encompasses Meigs, Polk, and part of Bradley Counties. He was preceded by Eric Watson, who was elected Sheriff of Bradley County in 2014. Since his election he has served as the chair of the Joint Government Operations Judiciary and Government Subcommittee, vice-chair of the House Local Government Committee, and as a member of the House Government Operations Committee, House Local Government Subcommittee, and the Joint Government Operations Committee. He is currently Chairman of the House Full Transportation Committee.

Howell was married to Carol Ann Howell from approximately 1963 until her death in February 2008. They had three children, Randall, Richard, and Rod. He has been married to Beverlee since mid 2012. He also has two step-children and seven grandchildren and step-grandchildren. He attends First Baptist Church in Cleveland and is a member of the National Rifle Association of America (NRA). He has been described as conservative, and supports smaller government, lower taxes Second Amendment rights, is anti-abortion, and has worked to reduce government regulations.

In 2023, Howell supported a resolution to expel Democratic lawmakers from the legislature for violating decorum rules. The expulsion was widely characterized as unprecedented.
