= Benton Springs, Tennessee =

Unincorporated community in Tennessee, US

Coordinates: 35°08′48″N 84°37′17″W

Benton Springs is an unincorporated community in Polk County, in the U.S. state of Tennessee.

The community was named for Thomas Hart Benton, a Missouri politician. Nearby Benton Station and Benton were also named for him as well.
