= Belltown, Polk County, Tennessee =

Unincorporated community in Tennessee, US

Coordinates: 35°00′17″N 84°21′23″W

Belltown is an unincorporated community in Polk County, in the U.S. state of Tennessee.

A large share of Belltown's original inhabitants had the surname Bell, hence the name.
