= North Carolina Highway 294 =

State highway in Cherokee County, North Carolina, US

North Carolina Highway 294

Route information
- Maintained by NCDOT
- Length: 13.3 mi (21.4 km)
- Existed: 1931–present

Major junctions
- West end: SR 123 at the Tennessee state line in Liberty
- East end: US 64 / US 74 in Ranger

Location
- Country: United States
- State: North Carolina
- Counties: Cherokee

Highway system
- North Carolina Highway System; Interstate; US; State; Scenic
← I-285	→ I-295

North Carolina Highway 294 (NC 294) is a primary state highway in the U.S. state of North Carolina. The highway serves to connect communities along the southern banks of the Hiwassee River.

== Route description ==
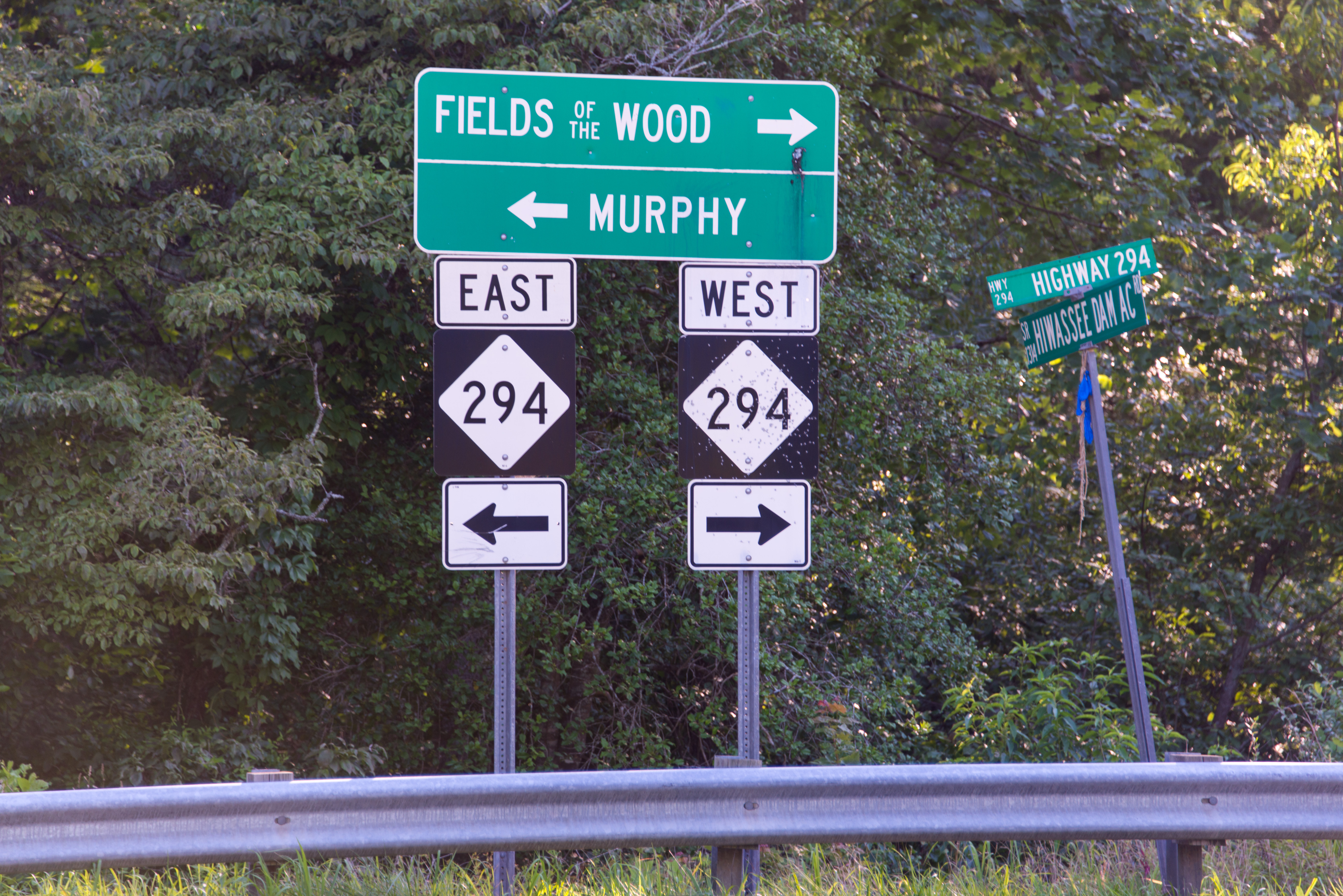
NC 294 signage at Hiwassee Dam Access Road

NC 294 is a two-lane mountain rural highway that is wholly in the Nantahala National Forest. From its western terminus at the Tennessee state line, it connects the communities of Liberty, Suit and Letitia to its eastern terminus at U.S. Route 64 (US 64) and US 74. It also goes by Fields of the Wood, a bible park, and access to the Hiwassee Dam.

== History ==
Established in 1931 as a new primary routing, NC 294 traveled from NC 28 (today US 64/US 74), through Postell, to the Tennessee state line. In 1932, it was extended east by overlapping with US 64/NC 28 then southwest on new primary routing to the Georgia state line, towards Blue Ridge. In 1934, NC 294 eastern terminus was truncated back to its original and current location; its newer segment renumbered to NC 60. In 1942, NC 294 was rerouted north onto upgraded existing and new construction, bypassing Postell on Candy Mountain Road (SR 1150).

== Junction list ==
The entire route is in Cherokee County.

Location	mi	km	Destinations	Notes
	0.0	0.0	SR 123 west – Ducktown	
Ranger	13.3	21.4	US 64 / US 74 – Murphy, Chattanooga	
1.000 mi = 1.609 km; 1.000 km = 0.621 mi
