= Harbuck, Tennessee =

- Unincorporated community
- Location within Tennessee Location within the United States
- Coordinates: 35°05′32″N 84°22′19″W
- Country: United States
- State: Tennessee
- County: Polk
- Elevation: 1,644 ft (501 m)
- Time zone: UTC-5 (Eastern (EST))
  - Summer (DST): UTC-4 (EDT)
- Area code: 423
- GNIS feature ID: 1328386

Harbuck is an unincorporated community in Polk County, Tennessee, United States. Harbuck is located on Tennessee State Route 68 and a Tennessee Overhill Heritage association Railroad line 4 miles (6.4 km) north of Ducktown.
