= Ball Play, Polk County, Tennessee =

Unincorporated community in Tennessee, US

Coordinates: 35°01′45″N 84°42′08″W

Ball Play is an unincorporated community in Polk County, Tennessee, in the United States.

== History ==
Ball Play was named from the Indigenous North American stickball played at an Indian settlement near the town site.
