= Tantur Ecumenical Institute =

International ecumenical institute

- Former name: Jerusalem Ecumenical Institute for Advanced Theological Research at Tantur
- Motto: Phôs Christou phinei Pâsin
- Motto in English: "The Light of Christ shines for all"
- Type: Advanced research institute
- Established: 1972
- Affiliations: University of Notre Dame, Pontifical Council for Promoting Christian Unity
- Religious affiliation: Christian ecumenism
- Rector: John Paul, S.J.
- Location: Jerusalem; 31.729167°N 35.203179°E
- Colors: gold, blue, Jerusalem Sandstone
- Website: tantur.org

Tantur Ecumenical Institute is an international ecumenical institute for theological research and pastoral formation in Jerusalem, on a hilltop beside the road between Jerusalem and Bethlehem. Founded at the initiative of Pope Paul VI, it opened in September 1972 and is administered by the University of Notre Dame on land owned by the Holy See.

== Goals and objectives ==
"No one climbs up to Tantur except to follow a vocation, the same vocation that led on the pioneers of ecumenism. That is the climate in which the research here must develop." (Albert Outler, Tantur, 1972)

The mission of the Tantur Ecumenical Institute is to:

- To work toward the unity of Christians (ecumenism);
- To contribute to positive relations between peoples of the Abrahamic faiths (interreligious dialogue);
- To be an agent for the reconciliation of peoples in conflict (peacebuilding, especially with respect to the Arab-Israeli Conflict/Israeli-Palestinian Conflict).

While the ecumenical mission of Christian unity is the central and core mission of Tantur, its location between Jerusalem and Bethlehem provides a natural context for the second-tier mission areas of interreligious dialogue and peacebuilding. Tantur serves as a place and resource for global ecumenical research, as well as for local initiatives in these areas.

In anticipation of the 50th anniversary of the lease and groundbreaking for the institute (1967), the international advisory board developed a new strategic plan for Tantur, which identified the following strategic goals:

- To once again become an internationally recognized galvanizing force for scholarship and dialogue on themes related to Christian unity.
- Embed Tantur more deeply into the academic and scholarly enterprise of the University of Notre Dame.
- Cultivate a commitment to spiritual ecumenism and a culture of encounter among pastoral leaders.

== History ==
=== The site before 1964 ===
The hilltop lies beside the ancient route between Jerusalem and Bethlehem, near Rachel's Tomb and the ruins of the Byzantine Church of the Kathisma. According to Notre Dame, the Sovereign Military Order of Malta held the land from the 12th century and used it chiefly as a hospital for sick pilgrims. In 1869 the Austrian diplomat and knight Count Bernhard Caboga-Cerva took possession of the property and established a hospice there, which Crown Prince Rudolf of Austria described in his Travels in the East (1884). The turreted gateway, in which Caboga is buried, is the only structure from that period to survive.

In July 2019 Notre Dame students, working with the Israel Antiquities Authority and Tel Aviv University, conducted the first formal archaeological survey of the grounds. Finds included pottery dated to the 8th century BC and mosaic fragments of a type common in Byzantine churches.

=== Founding ===
Anglican, Protestant and Orthodox observers at the Second Vatican Council proposed to Pope Paul VI an institute where Christian scholars of different traditions could share a life of prayer, study and dialogue. In April 1963 the pope asked Theodore Hesburgh, president of the University of Notre Dame, to create such an institute; a contemporary account dates the request to April 1964. His meeting with Patriarch Athenagoras I in Jerusalem in January 1964 settled the choice of location.

In September 1964 Paul VI received Hesburgh, then head of the International Federation of Catholic Universities, in audience. Over the following months the project was entrusted to Notre Dame and a committee of international ecumenical advisors, including Yves Congar, Oscar Cullmann, Jean-Jacques von Allmen, Georges Florovsky, J. N. D. Kelly, Raimon Panikkar and Karekin Sarkissian. Its Academic Council first met in 1965 at the Rockefeller Foundation's Villa Serbelloni in Bellagio, Italy, and chose the history of salvation as the institute's common theme of study. The American Methodist theologian Albert Outler was among its most active members; in 1966 Hesburgh described him as the council member most influential in bringing the project to completion. Its founding statement rejected "reunion by return" as a model of Christian unity.

Hesburgh and Pierre Duprey, a White Father, chose the site at Tantur, then in Jordanian territory, where a small community of Salesians was living. In December 1964 the Vatican bought the land from the Knights of Malta, who kept a smaller portion (today the Tantur Hills Hotel). The Vatican leased the remaining 36 acres to Notre Dame for 50 years at a symbolic one dollar a year. Hesburgh secured a donation for construction from I. A. and Mrs. O'Shaughnessy of St. Paul, Minnesota, and Notre Dame architecture professor Frank Montana designed the building.

Groundbreaking took place on 4 June 1967. The Six-Day War broke out the next day, and within a week the site was under Israeli control. Construction was delayed, but Tantur officially opened in September 1972 with an inaugural community of thirty scholars and their families, six Benedictine monks from Montserrat and five international staff, representing ten nationalities and thirteen religious identities. Yves Congar was one of the first senior scholars to reside at Tantur.

=== Choice of Jerusalem ===
The American Presbyterian theologian Robert McAfee Brown, a Protestant observer at the Second Vatican Council, set out the case for Jerusalem. The city holds many of the holiest sites of Christianity, Judaism and Islam, while the Church of the Holy Sepulchre is a vivid reminder of Christian division. It is also the scene of some of the deepest conflict among the world's religions, and it stands at a crossroads between the industrialised West and the developing world, where poverty, war, racism and hunger are all present.

Jean-Jacques von Allmen, one of the institute's early rectors, identified further benefits. Because the living tradition of the local church is that of the Eastern churches, Catholic and Orthodox, the setting would help Catholics move beyond Roman-centrism and the tendency towards Latinisation. It would challenge a latent Docetism among Protestants by tying the history of salvation to its geography. It would oblige theology to take account of the mystery of Israel and of Islam's place in God's design. And it was the city from which the Gospel went out and to which it must return, joining evangelism and eschatology.

=== Crisis and reorientation (1980s–1990s) ===
The founders had envisaged a resident community of senior and junior scholars, but the resident scholarly community never exceeded about 15–20 at a time. Reasons included limited funding for scholars, security concerns, and suspicion among some Eastern churches that ecumenism might be used for proselytism. By the mid-1980s annual operating costs approached US$1 million. Notre Dame was contributing a further $300,000–400,000 a year, and Hesburgh offered the building back to the Vatican, which declined.

The institute responded by broadening its mission. The founding monastic community from Montserrat left in 1984, and in 1985 Tantur introduced an undergraduate semester for Notre Dame students, a peace academy, and a renewal program for missionaries and pastors. Sabbatical and continuing-education programs for clergy and pastoral workers, retreats and conferences followed. The student program was suspended for two years during the First Intifada and the Gulf War.The Pontifical Mission for Palestine funded library maintenance and a scholarship fund for teachers from Africa, Asia, Latin America and Eastern Europe. Under rector Thomas Stransky, Tantur also became a meeting place for Israelis and Palestinians. From 1993 it held an annual Tantur Conference on Religion and Culture, and in 1994 it hosted 39 conferences and groups.

=== Since 2000 ===
The Second Intifada (2000–2005) brought international travel to Jerusalem to a halt. In 2008, after a nine-year hiatus, Notre Dame revived its undergraduate study-abroad program at Tantur. Notre Dame's academic centre on the campus, known from 2018 as part of the University of Notre Dame at Tantur and formerly as the Jerusalem Global Gateway, was renamed Notre Dame Jerusalem in 2024.

Following the Hamas-led attack on Israel of 7 October 2023 and the ensuing Gaza war, students and continuing-education participants at Tantur spent time in shelters, and only a few staff remained on site. By August 2024 the institute had cancelled its programs for lack of participants. A pilgrimage the British Trust for Tantur had planned to host at the institute in April 2024 was cancelled, and the Trust's accounts describe Tantur's income as severely disrupted.

In 2026 Notre Dame opened a search for a new rector, with an anticipated start in early summer 2027.

== Scholarly research and community ==
The core of Tantur’s mission and program is a community of doctoral and post-doctoral researchers working in areas related to its mission of promoting Christian unity (ecumenism). This particularly includes scripture studies, ecclesiology, patristics, and sacramental theology. Other scholars focus on the aspects of interreligious dialogue and peacebuilding.

Tantur was built to house up to a hundred individuals, including scholars and their families. Historically, the resident scholarly community has rarely exceeded 15–20 people at a time.

Additional community members are drawn from participants in the sabbatical and continuing education programs, graduate and undergraduate students from the University of Notre Dame, ecumenical pilgrim groups, volunteers from church organizations, and participants in local programs and conferences.

All community members are invited to participate in a community evening on Sundays, including ecumenical evening prayer and dinner. Except for some of the study-abroad programs, most are offered full board and participate in daily common ecumenical prayer.

By 1989 more than 2,500 Anglican, Catholic, Orthodox and Protestant scholars and participants had taken part in Tantur's programs; the institute now gives the figure as more than 5,000.

=== Continuing education programs ===
Several different sabbatical, continuing education, and accredited courses are offered to serve those seeking to deepen their understanding of the Land, its history, culture, and the faiths of the people here. They are primarily designed for Christian pastoral leaders (ordained or lay) from all communions and denominations, or academics and educators in a field of theology related to the mission of Tantur.

All of the programs take advantage of the experience of the Holy Land as the "fifth gospel", weaving classroom instruction with on-site excursions. Hebrew and Christian Scriptures, Biblical Geography and Archaeology, History of the Middle East, Christian Spirituality, Peace-building., and encounters with Judaism, Islam, and local Christian communities are integrated with visits to Christian holy sites and those important to the history of the Land. Programs often include visits around Jerusalem and Bethlehem, the Galilee, the Dead Sea, and the Negev. Longer programs include visits to the Western Wall and the Dome of the Rock; experience at a synagogue and Shabbat meal with a Jewish family; experience at a local Arabic Christian liturgy and meals with families, and the like.

A three-month sabbatical program is offered in the fall, and usually draws clergy, lay pastoral workers, and educators.

A three-week Easter Encounter program is organized around the Western Holy Week in Jerusalem, and includes liturgies or meetings at Catholic, Anglican, and Lutheran churches during that time. When the Gregorian and Julian dates for Easter coincide, Orthodox liturgies are included. One-month programs are offered during the summer months, usually in June and July.

An intensive four-week course in the summer is offered in Modern Hebrew specifically for academics who have already a knowledge of Biblical Hebrew.

=== Study-abroad programs ===
During the spring semester, undergraduate students of the University of Notre Dame are invited to come on a study abroad program at Tantur, with courses offered in Anthropology, Art History, Political History, International Peace Studies, Philosophy, Theology, and language studies in Hebrew or Arabic.

A three-week theology seminar is offered for undergraduates from any U.S. college or university, entitled, "Three Faiths, Two Peoples: Jews, Christians, and Muslims in the Holy Land."

=== Ecumenical pilgrims ===
Tantur is also a destination for university groups, ecumenical pilgrimage groups, retreats and academic conferences.

== Campus and facilities ==
Tantur has 100,000 square feet in building space, on a campus of 36 acres. The architect, Francesco "Frank" Montana, was dedicated to using only local Jerusalem sandstone and local labor. He describes the effect,

"The pattern of the stones is irregular, with uneven contours on which light can play. The idea behind this was that the masonry should lead the eye out to the surrounding landscape of the desert of Judea, because there you have before you a complete geography of salvation, from the Old Testament to Jesus Christ. I planned many terraces on which people can meet and from which they can look towards Jerusalem, Bethlehem, and Beit Jala. On the terraces, you can watch the galloping clouds coming up from the sea, bringing a life-giving benediction to the far deserts, or you can feel the east wind scorching your face like the fire of the burning bush."

=== Library ===
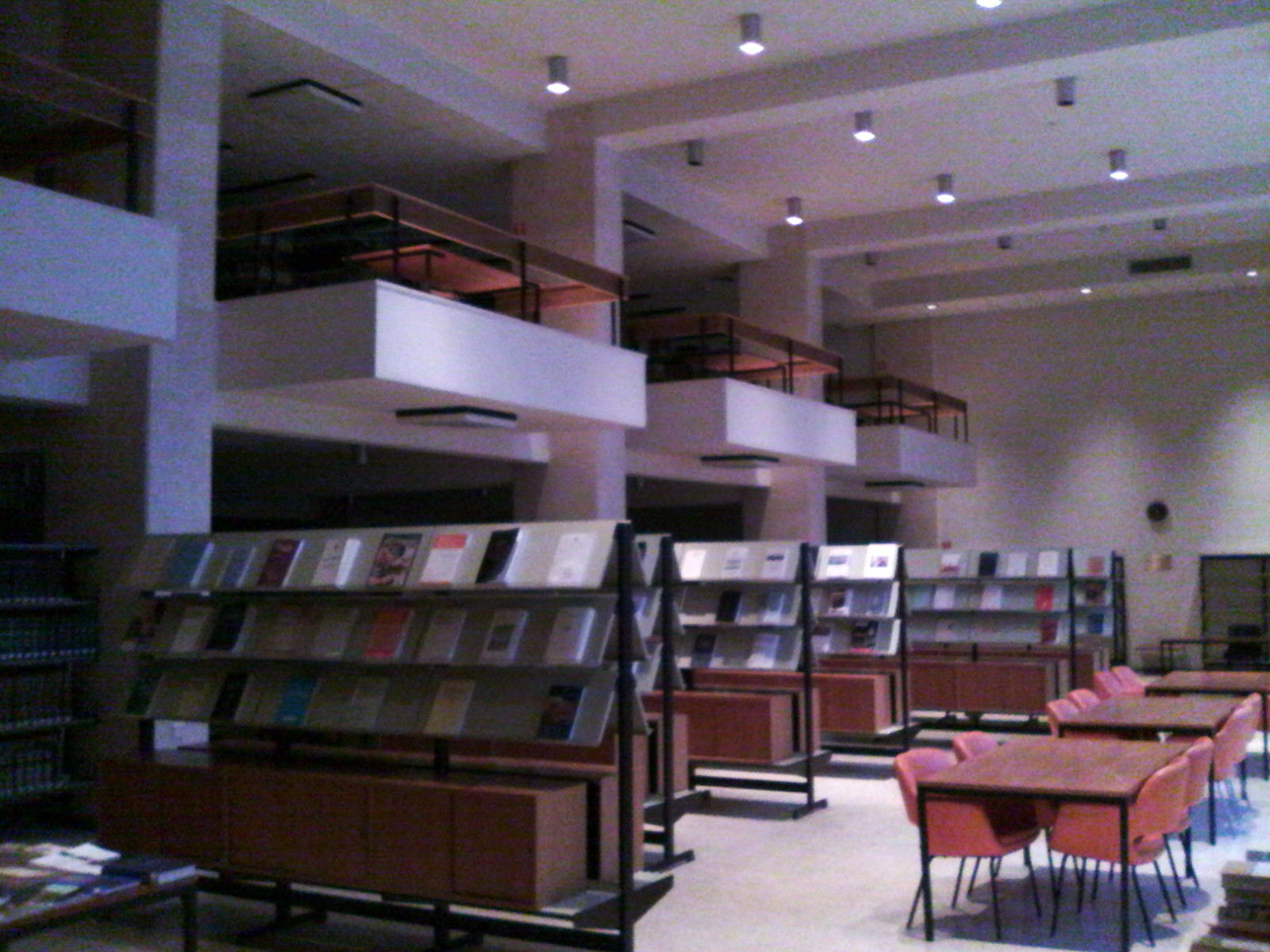
Research Library at Tantur Ecumenical Institute, Jerusalem

The Tantur Ecumenical Research Library is one of the largest Christian theological libraries in the Holy Land and the Middle East, and one of the largest ecumenical libraries worldwide.

The library holds about 65,000 volumes, with room for another 40,000; in 1995 the collection numbered about 56,000 volumes. Its periodicals collection includes 400 journals, though a smaller number of these are current. The primary collection is in ecumenism and patristics, but there are strong collections in religions and interreligious dialogue (especially with Judaism and Islam), biblical studies, church history, and international peace studies, with an emphasis on Arab-Israeli and Israel-Palestine questions. The library houses the collection of the Israel/Palestine Center for Research and Information (IPCRI), the periodicals of the Ecumenical Fraternity, and personal collections of former resident scholars such as Oscar Cullmann and Thomas Stransky.

The majority of texts are in English, French, and German, but with a number of titles in Spanish, Italian, Greek, Arabic, and Hebrew.

=== Chapels and prayer spaces ===
There are four primary places of community prayer at Tantur, though prayer and the practice of spiritual ecumenism is encouraged in all places at all hours:

- A large ecumenical chapel
- A medium interfaith meditation room
- A small oratory with the Blessed Sacrament reserved
- An outdoor shrine with an Icon of Christ Pantocrator and the New Jerusalem, written by Ian Knowles of the Bethlehem Icon School.
- Olive groves accros the grounds

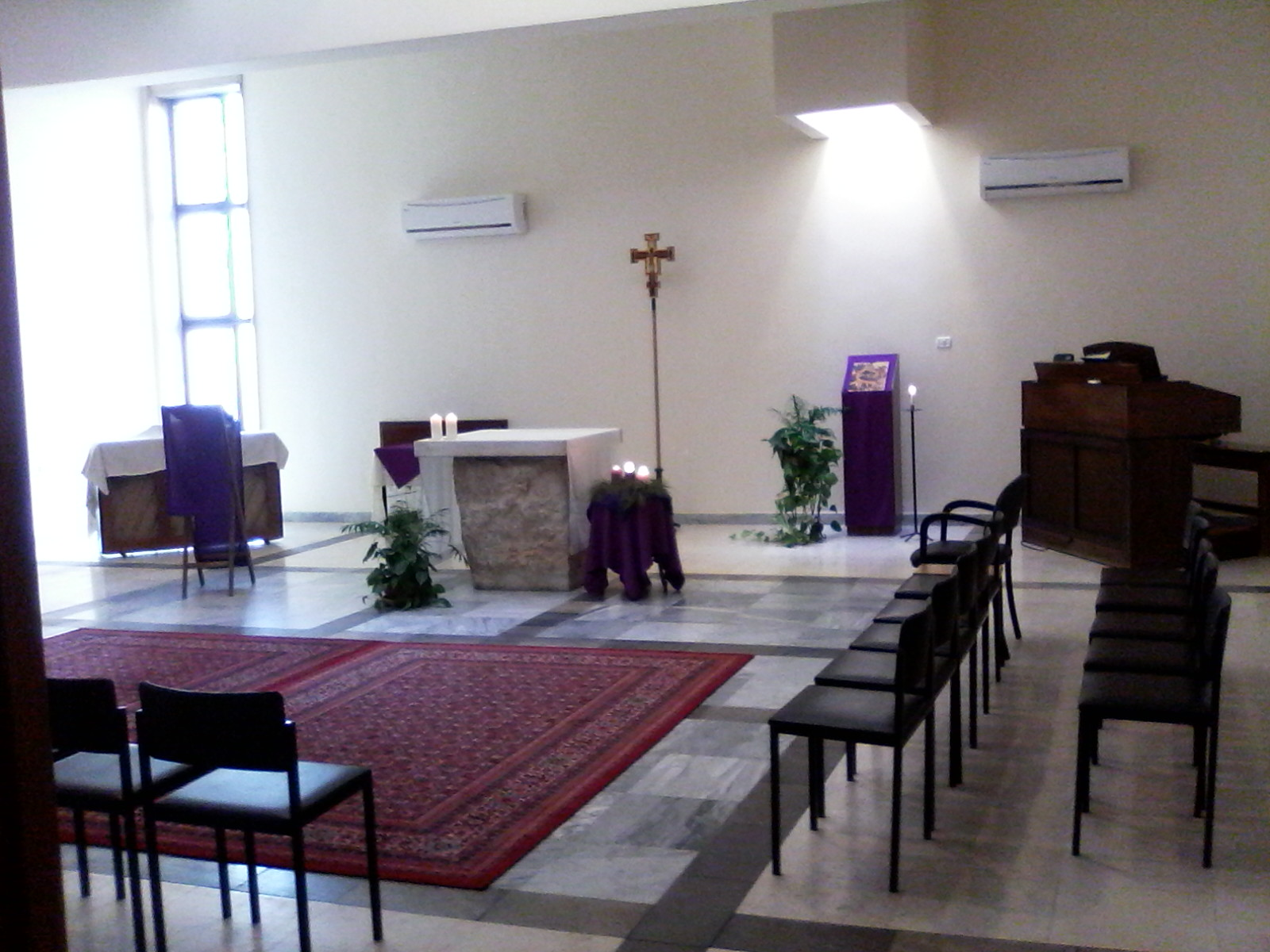
Ecumenical Chapel at Tantur Ecumenical Institute, Jerusalem

=== Classrooms and meeting spaces ===
When built, the Tantur Auditorium was the largest of its kind in Jerusalem, with a capacity of 120 people.

Seminar rooms include the Bethlehem Room and Chapel Seminar Room, each with broad vistas and terraces of the surrounding villages, and a capacity for about thirty people. Small seminar rooms include the Notre Dame Room and Library Seminar Room, each ideal for about a dozen people. The Jerusalem Global Gateway building houses the Notre Dame study abroad classes, just southwest of the main facility.

=== Flora and fauna ===
Tantur’s hill is covered with about 500 olive trees, and is a home or oasis for a variety of local fauna: snakes, scorpions, bats, parrots, quail, lizards, geckos, feral cats and dogs, foxes, and a jackal.

== Leadership ==
The rector resides at Tantur, is an employee of the University of Notre Dame, and reports to the Executive Director of the university's Office of Mission Engagement and Church Affairs (OMECA). The rector works alongside the Director of Notre Dame Jerusalem, who stewards the campus and is the legal signatory, and the Senior Ecumenical Fellow, a Notre Dame faculty member who leads the institute's scholarly activities.

=== Current staff ===
- Rev. John M. Paul, S.J., Rector (since 1 July 2020)
- Mr. Nizar Halloun, Program Director
- Sr. Marie-Farouza Maximos, Chemin Neuf Community

=== Senior Ecumenical Fellows ===
The post was created in 2016.

- Rev. Brian E. Daley, S.J. (2016–c. 2021)
- Rev. Khaled Anatolios (by 2021–present)

=== Rectors ===
Rector	Term	Notes
Rev. Prof. Paul S. Minear	1971–1972	Pro-Rector; Congregational minister; professor of biblical theology, Yale Divinity School
Mgr. Charles Moeller	1972–1973	Belgian Catholic priest; professor, Université catholique de Louvain; peritus at the Second Vatican Council; later Secretary of the Secretariat for Promoting Christian Unity
Rev. Prof. Jean-Jacques von Allmen	1973–1974	Pastor of the Reformed Church of Neuchâtel; professor of practical theology, University of Neuchâtel. The Historical Dictionary of Switzerland dates his rectorship 1971–1974.
Prof. Walter Wegner	1974–1977	Lutheran Church–Missouri Synod; editorial staff, Concordia Theological Monthly, Concordia Seminary
Prof. Walter J. Harrelson	1977–1979	Baptist; Vanderbilt Divinity School
Prof. Joseph Blenkinsopp	Fall 1978	Interim rector; Catholic; John A. O'Brien Professor of Biblical Studies, University of Notre Dame
Rev. George MacRae, S.J.	1979–1980	Society of Jesus; Charles Chauncey Stillman Professor of Roman Catholic Studies, Harvard Divinity School
Rev. David B. Burrell, C.S.C.	1980–1981	Congregation of Holy Cross; Department of Philosophy, University of Notre Dame
Prof. Donald Nicholl	1981–1985	Historian; seconded from Keele University
Dr. Landrum R. Bolling	1985–c. 1988	Former president of Earlham College, a Quaker-affiliated college (1958–1973)
Rev. Thomas F. Stransky, C.S.P.	c. 1988–1998	Paulist Fathers; original staff member of the Secretariat for Promoting Christian Unity. Writing in October 1989, he described himself as rector for almost two years.
Rev. Michael B. McGarry, C.S.P.	1998–2010	Paulist Fathers; previously pastor of Newman Hall/Holy Spirit Parish, Berkeley; later president of the Paulist Fathers
Very Rev. Timothy S. Lowe	2010–2013	Priest of the Orthodox Church in America
Mr. Anthony Pohlen	2013–2014	Interim Rector
Rev. Russell K. McDougall, C.S.C.	2014–2020	Congregation of Holy Cross; consultor of the Dicastery for Promoting Christian Unity from 2025
Rev. John M. Paul, S.J.	2020–present	Society of Jesus, Midwest Province

=== Vice-rectors ===
Vice-rector	Term	Notes
Rev. Prof. Jean-Jacques von Allmen	1972–1973	Reformed Church of Neuchâtel; University of Neuchâtel
Archim. Chrysostomos (Gerasimos) Zaphiris	1972–1974	
Rev. Pierre Benoit, O.P.	1973–1974	Dominican Order; director of the École Biblique, Jerusalem
Rev. Benedict T. Viviano, O.P.		Dominican Order; École Biblique, Jerusalem; University of Fribourg
Rev. Robert A. O'Donnell, C.S.P.	1988–1991	Paulist Fathers; former president of St. Paul's College, Washington, D.C.
Sr. Shelagh Phillips	1991–1994	
Rev. Prof. Bengt Holmberg	1996–1998	Church of Sweden; professor of New Testament exegesis, Lund University
Prof. Knud Jeppesen	1998–2004	
Sr. Bridget Tighe, F.M.D.M.	2006–2011	Franciscan Missionaries of the Divine Motherhood; later executive director of Caritas Jerusalem in Gaza

== Notable alumni ==
- Kenneth E. Bailey – New Testament scholar; research professor of Middle Eastern New Testament studies at Tantur for ten years
- George J. Brooke – Dead Sea Scrolls scholar; research scholar at Tantur, March–May 1983
- Frans Bouwen, M.Afr. – Belgian Missionary of Africa (White Father) resident in Jerusalem since 1969; long-time director of the journal Proche-Orient Chrétien
- Yves Congar, O.P. – French Dominican ecclesiologist, peritus at the Second Vatican Council and later cardinal; member of the founding advisory committee and one of the first senior scholars in residence
- Oscar Cullmann – Lutheran New Testament scholar (Basel and Strasbourg) and guest observer at Vatican II; instrumental in Tantur's foundation; his personal collection is held in the Tantur library
- Godfrey Diekmann, O.S.B. – Benedictine of Saint John's Abbey, Collegeville; patristics scholar, leader of the liturgical movement and adviser at Vatican II
- Moshe Greenberg – Israeli-American Hebrew Bible scholar at the Hebrew University of Jerusalem
- Bede Griffiths, O.S.B. Cam. – English Benedictine, later Camaldolese, monk; pioneer of Hindu–Christian dialogue at Shantivanam ashram, India
- Judith Lieu – British New Testament scholar; Lady Margaret's Professor of Divinity, University of Cambridge
- George Lindbeck – American Lutheran theologian at Yale; delegated observer at Vatican II and a founder of postliberal theology
- Nikos Nissiotis – Greek Orthodox theologian; director of the Ecumenical Institute of Bossey (World Council of Churches)
- Raimon Panikkar – Spanish-Indian Catholic priest and scholar of interreligious dialogue; member of the founding advisory committee
- James A. Sanders – American Hebrew Bible scholar, pioneer of canonical criticism; founder of the Ancient Biblical Manuscript Center, Claremont
- Charles E. Sheedy, C.S.C. – Holy Cross priest; dean of the College of Arts and Letters, University of Notre Dame
- Kristen Ejner Skydsgaard – Danish Lutheran theologian, University of Copenhagen; Lutheran World Federation observer at Vatican II
- John Howard Yoder – American Mennonite theologian and ethicist, University of Notre Dame; taught in Jerusalem

== Bibliography ==
- Chandran, J. R. "Ecumenical Institute for Advanced Theological Study at Jerusalem". Indian Journal of Theology 22, no. 4: 178–180.
- Cullmann, Oscar. "Un’opera di riconciliazione a Gerusalemme: L’Istituto Ecumenico di Ricerche Teologiche". Aldo Moda, trans. In Studia Patavina: Rivista di Scienze Religiose, Vol. 20, No. 1, 1973: 54-69.
- Cunningham, Lawrence, ed. Ecumenism: Present Realities and Future Prospects. Notre Dame, 1999.
- Daley, Brian E. A Wider History of Salvation? Tantur’s Mission after Fifty Years. Unpublished. Presented in Jerusalem: Tantur, 8 January 2015.
- Guasco, Alberto. L'Istituto ecumenico di Tantur (1963-1978). Appunti e problemi per una storia, "Cristianesimo nella storia", 1 (2017), pp. 221–246
- Guasco, Alberto. "Theodore Hesburgh e l'Istituto ecumenico di Tantur (1963–1978). Un contributo al cammino ecumenico". Mondo Contemporaneo 3 (2021): 43–76. doi:10.3280/MON2021-003002
- Hesburgh, Theodore M., with Jerry Reedy. God, Country, Notre Dame. New York: Doubleday, 1990.
- Jaeger, D.-M. A., ed. Tantur Papers on Christianity in the Holy Land. Studia Oecumenica Hierosolymitana No.1. Jerusalem: Franciscan Printing Press, 1981.
- Lowe, Timothy, ed. Hope of Unity:Living Ecumenism Today. Jerusalem, 2013.
- Mayhead, Dom John. "A Journey of Reconciliation with the Tantur Ecumenical Institute: 11 March-11 April 2008" in One in Christ, Vol. 42, No. 1 (Summer 2008): 187-200. ISSN 0030-252X
- Nicholl, Donald. The Testing of Hearts: A Pilgrim's Journal. London: Lamp Press, 1989.
- Reedy, Jerry. “Higher Learning.” Notre Dame Magazine, Spring 1995.
- Roden, Renée. Tantur: Seeking Christian Unity in a Divided City. Liturgical Press, 2025.
- Stransky, Thomas F. “Tantur: Dialogue on the Road to Jerusalem.” ONE/Catholic Near East Magazine, October 1989.
- Stransky, Thomas F., CSP. "Tantur Ecumenical Institute," in Dictionary of the Ecumenical Movement.
- Witton Davies, C. "Tantur: An Ecumenical Centre in the Holy Land" in The Tablet, 14 June 1975.
