= Turtletown, Tennessee =

- Unincorporated community
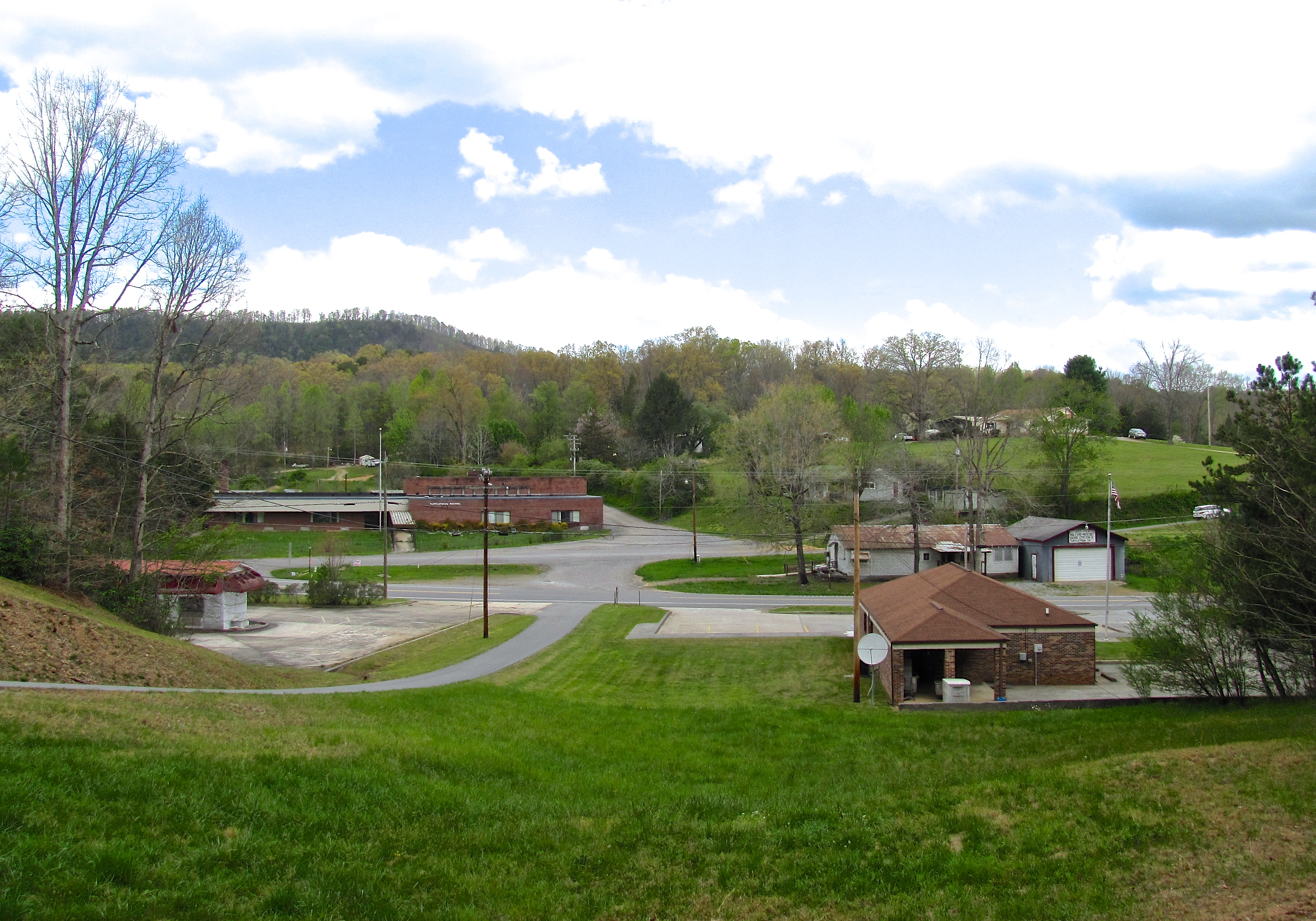
- Turtletown

- Location within Tennessee Location within the United States
- Coordinates: 35°07′37″N 84°21′13″W
- Country: United States
- State: Tennessee
- County: Polk
- Elevation: 1,558 ft (475 m)
- Time zone: UTC-5 (Eastern (EST))
  - Summer (DST): UTC-4 (EDT)
- ZIP code: 37391
- Area code: 423
- GNIS feature ID: 1327270

Turtletown is an unincorporated community in Polk County, Tennessee, United States. Turtletown is located on Tennessee State Route 68 6.5 miles (10.5 km) north-northeast of Ducktown. Turtletown is in a primarily mountainous terrain, covered in forests except for areas cleared by farmers, ponds, or roads. Turtletown has a post office with ZIP code 37391. Turtletown's borders, however, in the eyes of some are disputed. According to one, parts of it are known as Dogtown, which appears on a few local maps. However, to others, it is simply all Turtletown and Dogtown does not exist. The only known map that contains this is the USGS map of the area, and a U.S. Forest Service map. There is an abandoned school, Turtletown School, across the street from the Post Office.

== Population ==
The population, according to the United States Census Bureau, is 1,325, although the estimated population of Polk County is about 16,730 people.

== Geography ==
Turtletown is in a primarily mountainous terrain, covered in forests except for areas cleared by farmers, ponds, or roads. It also has creeks in the area.

== Notable person ==
- J. Chris Newton, member of the Tennessee House of Representatives (1995–2005)
