= Landrum Bolling =

American journalist and diplomat

President and Rector of Tantur Ecumenical Institute
- In office 1985–1988

CEO of Council on Foundations
- In office 1978–1982

President of Lilly Endowment
- In office ?–1978

President of Earlham College
- In office 1958–1973

Personal details
- Born: November 13, 1913 Parksville, Tennessee, US
- Died: January 17, 2018 (aged 104) Arlington, Virginia, US
- Spouse: Frances Morgan (m. 1936, divorced)
- Children: 6
- Education: UT Knoxville; University of Chicago

Landrum Rymer Bolling (November 13, 1913, – January 17, 2018) was an American educator, journalist, diplomat, and a noted pacifist. Despite not specializing in the Middle East, he became considered a leading expert and activist for peaceful resolution of the Israel-Palestine conflict. He worked as a war correspondent during and after World War II and was actively involved in the foreign policies of several presidential administrations, including that of Jimmy Carter. Bolling was also an educator and served as president of Earlham College for 15 years.

== Early life and education ==
Bolling was born in Parksville, Tennessee, the son of Baptists Landrum Austin Bolling and Carrie Mae Rymer. After earning his bachelor's degree at the University of Tennessee at Knoxville in 1933, he went to work for the newly formed Tennessee Valley Authority, then obtained his master's degree in Political Science at the University of Chicago in 1938.

== Career ==
Bolling's work in journalism started with a job as the first editor of the Norris News in Norris, Tennessee. In 1938, he became an instructor of political science at Brown University for two years, then joined the faculty of Beloit College in 1940. In 1941, he purchased the daily Ohio newspaper Yellow Springs News. During World War II, he relinquished his status as a conscientious objector to serve as a war correspondent for a collection of Wisconsin newspapers. He worked abroad in places including the Balkans, Italy, Austria, and Germany, and reported from Sarajevo during its liberation from Nazi occupation. He returned to teaching after the war, but only for a short time. He worked as a foreign correspondent from 1946 to 1948 before returning to the United States and taking a position as professor at Earlham College.

Bolling was promoted to the position of General Secretary of Earlham in 1955, and in 1958 he became president of the college, a position he held for fifteen years. Under his leadership, the college established a Phi Beta Kappa chapter; hired its first African American faculty member, William J. Cousins; expanded off-campus and international programs; and supported building initiatives, including a new library, residence hall, student center, and two academic buildings. After his resignation, Bolling was named an honorary trustee of Earlham College, and the new social sciences building was dedicated to him in 2002. After his term ended in 1973, he became vice president and later president of the Lilly Endowment, a large grant-making foundation based nearby. In 1978, he left Lilly to accept a position as CEO of the Council on Foundations. In 1982 he served as research professor of the Institute for the Study of Diplomacy at the Georgetown University School of Foreign Service for one year. He was also chairman or board member of the Associated Colleges of Indiana, the Indiana Conference on Higher Education, the National Association of Protestant Colleges and Universities, and the Association of American Colleges.

Bolling was an activist for peace and social justice throughout his life, both in the United States and abroad. After working as a journalist, he worked in the government to help improve communications between the U.S. and Palestine for many years and under several presidents. Most notably, during Jimmy Carter's administration, he was a highly trusted unofficial backchannel from the White House to the Palestine Liberation Organization and its leader, Yaser Arafat. He maintained his connections to leaders on all sides of the conflicts in the Middle East throughout his career. He later worked with NGOs, government officials, and religious leaders in Bosnia to promote cooperation between ethnic and religious groups. He also worked extensively with Mercy Corps, an international humanitarian agency, serving first as Director-at-Large and subsequently as a senior advisor, and was president of Pax World Service, a non-profit group affiliated with Mercy Corps. From 1985 to 1988, he was president and rector at the Tantur Ecumenical Institute in Jerusalem. He was also a senior advisor and board member of the Conflict Management Group in Cambridge, Massachusetts, and a senior fellow at the Center for International Policy in Washington, D.C. On the eve of Bolling's centennial birthday, former president Jimmy Carter emailed a tribute to The Palladium-Item, describing him as a "leader in philanthropic, humanitarian, and interfaith efforts, and... a citizen peacemaker." He shared that Bolling had given him advice and assistance while negotiating the Camp David Accords and that he remained an adviser for The Carter Center.

== Publications ==
Bolling wrote or co-wrote several books:

- Search for Peace in the Middle East (American Friends Service Committee, 1970). OCLC 264914454.
- This is Germany (William Sloane Associates, 1950). ISBN 0836924274.
- Private Foreign Aid: U.S. philanthropy for relief and development (Westview Press, 1982). ISBN 0865313938.
- Reporters Under Fire: U.S. Media Coverage of Conflicts in Lebanon and Central America (Westview Press, 1984). ISBN 081337006X.
- Conflict Resolution: Track Two Diplomacy (Foreign Service Institute, 1987).
- Ending the Israeli-Palestinian conflict : Arab-Jewish partnership (Piedmont Press, 2014). ISBN 0984505695.

Bolling also co-wrote the documentary Searching for Peace in the Middle East.

== Honors and awards ==
Bolling received honorary doctorates from over thirty foreign and American colleges and universities, including the University of Tennessee at Knoxville, the University of Notre Dame, Oberlin College, Haverford College, Indiana University, and Waseda University. In 1998, the University of Tennessee at Knoxville awarded him its Founders' Medal. In 2000, the National Peace Foundation honored him with the Peacemaker/Peacebuilder Award. In 2005, he received the James L. Fisher Award for Distinguished Service to Education by the Council for Advancement and Support of Education, and in 2010 he received the lifetime achievement award from the National Council on U.S.-Arab Relations.

== Personal life ==
Bolling married Frances Morgan (1914-2008), daughter of Tennessee Valley Authority chairman Arthur Ernest Morgan, on July 6, 1936. He converted from Baptism to Quakerism, his wife's family's religion. Being a Quaker ultimately informed his pacifism and belief in the importance of understanding the other side's point of view. They had six children, five of whom survived to adulthood.

He died of congestive heart failure in Arlington, Virginia at the home of his daughter on January 17, 2018.
