= Chilhowee Gliderport =

Airport in Tennessee, United States

- IATA: none; ICAO: none; FAA LID: 92A

Summary
- Airport type: Public
- Owner: Chilhowee Soaring Association
- Serves: Benton, Tennessee
- Elevation AMSL: 770 ft (230 m)
- Coordinates: 35°13′35″N 084°35′06″W

Map
- Location of airport in Tennessee 92A (the United States)

Runways
Direction	Length		Surface
Direction	ft	m	Surface
3/21	2,600	792	Turf

Statistics (2008)
- Aircraft operations: 10,820
- Based aircraft: 29
- Source: Federal Aviation Administration

Chilhowee Gliderport (FAA LID: 92A) is a privately owned public-use glider airport located four nautical miles (5 mi, 7 km) northeast of the central business district of Benton, in Polk County, Tennessee, United States.

== Historical ==
In 1973 Michael Reisman and other glider enthusiasts leased some farm property southwest of Benton and developed a gliderport and recreational flying field. Because the land was part of a farm called Chilhowee, the name became permanently attached to the airfield.

== Facilities and aircraft ==
Chilhowee Gliderport has one runway designated 3/21 with a turf surface measuring 2,600 by 200 feet (792 x 61 m).

For the 12-month period ending December 31, 2008, the airport had 10,820 aircraft operations, an average of 29 per day: 98% general aviation and 2% military. At that time there were 29 aircraft based at this airport: 90% glider and 10% single-engine.

Chilhowee Gliderport is nestled against the western foothills of the Great Smoky Mountains. Directly east of the 3,000-foot turf strip is Bean Mountain and Oswald Dome. Ridges along these mountains extend for more than 20 miles, providing near perfect wind currents and lift conditions for gliders.

== See also ==
- List of airports in Tennessee
