= Benton Spring Fault =

Geological fault in western Nevada

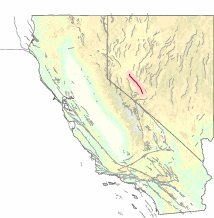
The Benton Spring fault zone in Nevada, United States

The Benton Spring Fault (also known as the Bettles Well fault) is a right lateral-moving (dextral) geologic fault located in western Nevada. It is considered an integral part of the Walker Lane.
