= Benton Station, Tennessee =

Human settlement in United States of America

Coordinates: 35°11′15″N 84°41′00″W

Benton Station is an unincorporated community in Polk County, in the U.S. state of Tennessee. The community is two miles east from the county seat of Benton on Benton Station Road. The community of Benton which is different than Benton Station was named for Thomas Hart Benton, a Missouri politician.

== Notable events ==
Benton Station received attention in 2017 for two notable events. In January, a historic bridge in the area was renamed “Bear Lawson Bridge” by the Polk County Commission in honor of William “Bear” Hinton Lawson. At a ceremony to celebrate the renaming, Polk County Executive Hoyt Firestone credited Lawson for donating land that allowed a railroad to run through the community in the early 1900s.

In June 2017, the Tennessee Historic Commission designated Benton Station as a Historic Landmark. Bluegrass musician Phil Lea performed at the event and announced he had written a song about the Benton Station community.

December 27, 1920. Decie Caldonia Rose, wife of Robert Henley Rose, was killed by an automobile on Benton/Cleveland pike while going for the mail. She was a member of Benton Station Baptist Church. She was reportedly the first woman to be killed by an automobile in the state of Tennessee.
