= Parksville, Tennessee =

- Unincorporated community
- Location within Tennessee Location within the United States
- Coordinates: 35°05′57″N 84°39′03″W
- Country: United States
- State: Tennessee
- County: Polk
- Elevation: 840 ft (260 m)
- Time zone: UTC-6 (Central (CST))
  - Summer (DST): UTC-5 (EST)
- Area code: 423
- GNIS feature ID: 1296859

Parksville is an unincorporated community in Polk County, Tennessee, United States.

Landrum Bolling (1913-2018), American educator and diplomat, was born in Parksville.

== See also ==
- Ocoee Dam No. 1
- Copeland House (Parksville, Tennessee)
