= J. Chris Newton =

American politician (born 1970)

Chris Newton
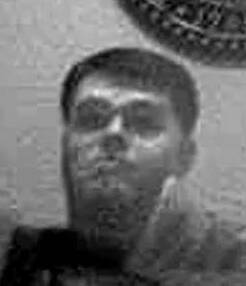
- Newton being filmed unknowingly as part of Operation Tennessee Waltz

Member of the Tennessee House of Representatives from the 22nd district
- In office January 10, 1995 – September 1, 2005
- Preceded by: Richard Fisher
- Succeeded by: Eric Watson

Personal details
- Born: November 9, 1970 (age 56)
- Party: Republican
- Education: University of Tennessee at Chattanooga (BS)
- Website: House website

J. Chris Newton (born November 9, 1970) is an American politician who served as a member of the Tennessee House of Representatives. A Republican, he represented the 22nd district, which includes Meigs, Polk, and parts of Bradley counties. He resigned in 2005 after being charged in Operation Tennessee Waltz.

== Background ==
J. Chris Newton was born on November 9, 1970. He received a Bachelor of Science in political science from the University of Tennessee at Chattanooga. He worked as a sales manager.

Newton was first elected in 1994, taking office the following January as part of the 99th General Assembly. In May 2005, Newton, along with several fellow lawmakers, was arrested and charged with bribery in the Operation Tennessee Waltz scandal.

He announced his resignation on September 1, 2005 under pressure from the state Republican Party, and on February 22, 2006, was sentenced to one year in prison. He served nine months in the minimum security prison camp at the United States Penitentiary in Atlanta. He was the only Republican charged in the operation.

As of 2015, Newton was reported to be working as a businessman in the Cleveland area.

== Personal life ==
Newton was married to Ginger Newton. Newton was also married to Angela Newton. As of August 2019, he is married to Brittany Sorayah (Kubba) Newton He is a Baptist.
