= Polk County, Tennessee =

County in Tennessee, United States

- County
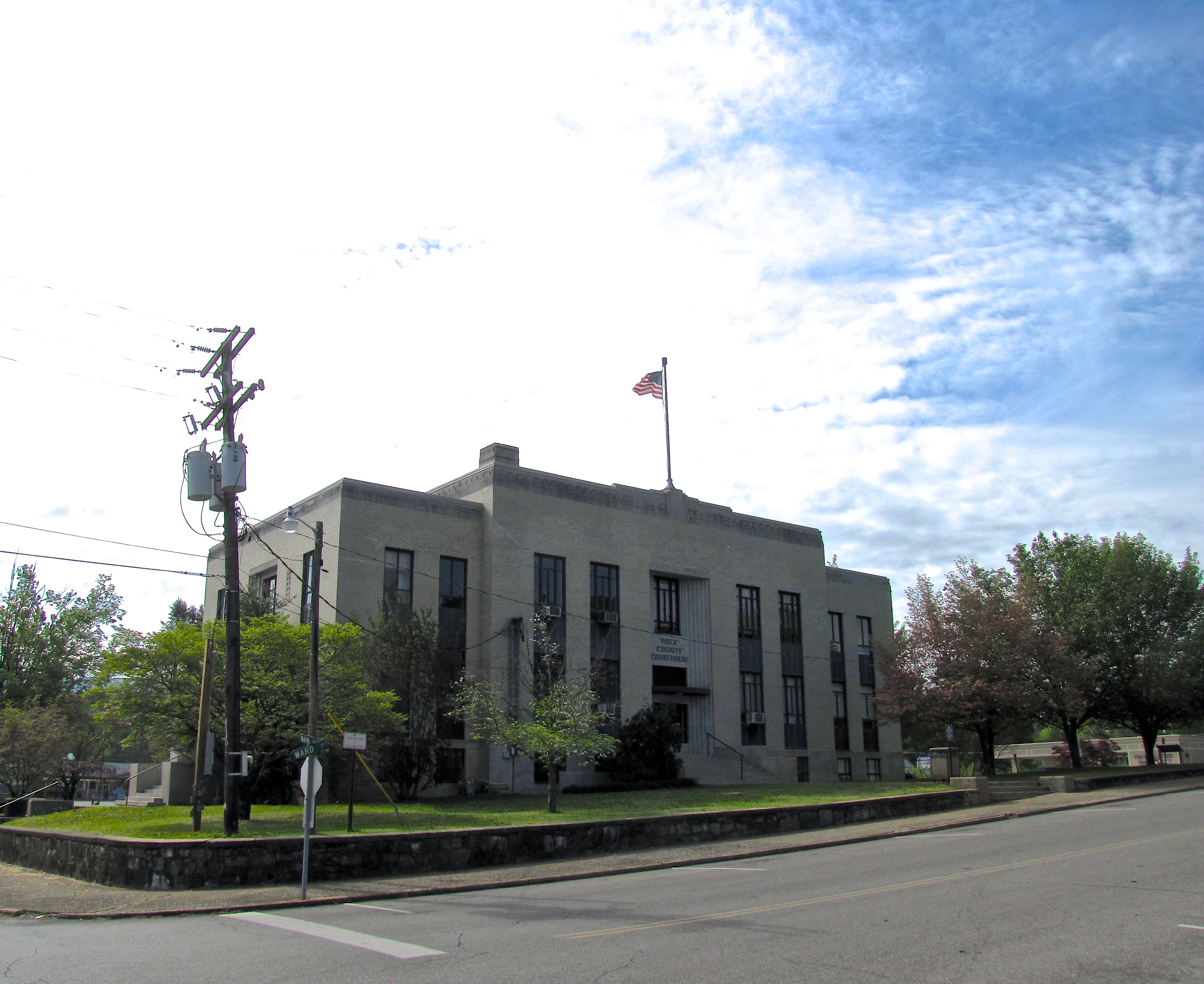
- Polk County Courthouse in Benton

- Seal

- Location within the U.S. state of Tennessee
- Coordinates: 35°08′N 84°31′W
- Country: United States
- State: Tennessee
- Founded: November 28, 1839
- Named for: James K. Polk
- Seat: Benton
- Largest town: Benton

Area
  - Total: 442 sq mi (1,140 km^{2})
  - Land: 435 sq mi (1,130 km^{2})
  - Water: 7.7 sq mi (20 km^{2}) 1.7%

Population (2020)
  - Total: 17,544
  - Estimate (2025): 18,592 ▲
  - Density: 40.33/sq mi (15.57/km^{2})
- Time zone: UTC−5 (Eastern)
  - Summer (DST): UTC−4 (EDT)
- Congressional district: 3rd
- Website: www.polkgovernment.com

Polk County is a county located in the southeastern corner of the U.S. state of Tennessee. As of the 2020 United States census, its population was 17,544. Its county seat is Benton. The county was created on November 28, 1839, from parts of Bradley and McMinn counties, after final removal of most Cherokee from the region that year. The county was named after then-governor (and future president) James K. Polk. Polk County is included in the Cleveland, Tennessee Metropolitan Area Statistical Area, which is also included in the Chattanooga–Cleveland–Dalton, TN–GA–AL Combined Statistical Area.

== History ==
Prior to the settlement of the Europeans, Polk County was inhabited by the Cherokee, and before them, thousands of years of indigenous cultures. The portion of Polk County north of the Hiwassee River was ceded by the Cherokee Nation to the US in the Calhoun Treaty of 1819. The rest of the county was part of the Ocoee District. According to the original border surveying plan, much of the land that would become eastern Polk County, including Copperhill and Ducktown, would have belonged to North Carolina. In 1819, surveyors were instructed to follow the highest ridges to the Georgia line. However, at Unicoi Gap surveyors immediately turned south for 15 miles, reportedly because they ran out of liquor and heard there was a moonshine still at the Georgia line. The Cherokee were forcibly removed from here in 1838–1839 and taken to Indian Territory, in a passage that became known as the Trail of Tears.

Polk County was created by an act of the Tennessee General Assembly on November 23, 1839. The location for the county seat of Benton was chosen by an election held on February 4, 1840.

Copper was discovered in Ducktown in 1843. By the 1850s, a large mining operation was underway in southeastern Polk County; the area became known as the Copper Basin. This operation continued until 1987, when the last mine closed.

During the Civil War, Polk County was one of only six counties in East Tennessee to support the Confederacy, voting in favor of Tennessee's ordinance of secession in June 1861. During the war, the copper mines supplied about 90% of the Confederacy's copper; their capture by Union forces after the Confederate defeat at the Battles for Chattanooga in November 1863 proved a major blow to the Confederacy. On November 29, 1864, a series of raids by Confederate bushwhacker John P. Gatewood in Polk County resulted in at least 16 deaths.

US-64 through the Ocoee Gorge was built around 1926. It was not paved until the 1940s. The East Tennessee Power Company, later the Tennessee Electric Power Company (TEPCO), constructed two hydroelectric dams on the Ocoee River, Ocoee Dams 1 and 2, which were completed in 1911 and 1913, respectively. TEPCO was later purchased by the Tennessee Valley Authority (TVA), founded in 1933. It constructed an additional dam on this river, Ocoee Dam No. 3, completed in 1943, as well as the powerhouse for Apalachia Dam on the Hiwassee River in northern Polk County, which was also completed in 1943.

In 1973, a large music festival known as the "Midwest Monster Peace Jubilee and Music Festival", commonly known as the "Monster Peace Jubilee", was planned by Indiana-based promoter C.F. Manifest Inc. to take place on a 1,300-acre farm north of Benton on Labor Day of that year. The farm was owned by the county executive. (It has been redeveloped as the Chilhowee Gliderport.) Nicknamed "Polkstock" due to its resemblance to 1969's Woodstock in Bethel, New York, the event was expected to attract approximately 500,000 people. Locals strongly opposed it, especially members of the religious communities, who believed the festival would bring much of the perceived rock music culture. The festival was eventually halted by the state circuit court, on the request of the district attorney, who said that the festival would constitute a public nuisance, due to drug, health, and traffic problems.

On May 27, 1983, a massive explosion at a secret illegal fireworks factory killed eleven workers. The operation, located on a bait farm a few miles south of Benton, was unlicensed. It produced M-80 and M-100 fireworks, both illegal, and was the largest illegal fireworks operation in the United States to date.

The Ocoee Whitewater Center was the site of the canoe slalom events for the 1996 Summer Olympics, based in Atlanta, Georgia.

In April 2019, Polk County was the first county in Tennessee to become a "gun sanctuary", or Second Amendment sanctuary.

== Geography ==
According to the U.S. Census Bureau, the county has a total area of 442 square miles (1,140 km^{2}), of which 435 square miles (1,130 km^{2}) is land and 7.7 square miles (20 km^{2}) (1.7%) is water. As the most southeastern county in Tennessee, it is the state's only county to share borders with both Georgia and North Carolina.

Most of the terrain of Polk County is mountainous, constituting part of the southern Blue Ridge Mountains, among the southern Appalachian Mountains. The western edge of the county is part of the Ridge-and-Valley Appalachians, which comprise about one-sixth of the county's land area. The Copper Basin is located in the extreme southeastern part of Polk County. Big Frog Mountain, at an elevation of 4,224 ft (1,287 m), is the county's highest point; west of Big Frog Mountain there is no higher point until the Black Hills of South Dakota or the Guadalupe Mountains of Texas. About 80% of the land area of Polk County is now part of the Cherokee National Forest, covering most of the Blue Ridge portion of the county except for the Copper Basin and other small tracts. Most of the Ridge-and-Valley portion of the county is privately owned.

The Ocoee River, site of whitewater slalom events in the Atlanta 1996 Summer Olympic Games, runs through Polk County and is vital to one of the county's major industries, whitewater rafting. The calmer Hiwassee River, a tributary of the Tennessee River which flows through northern Polk County, is also used for rafting and tubing. The Conasauga River, the only river in Tennessee that is not part of the Mississippi River Basin, is located in southwestern Polk County. Most of the population of Polk County lives in the Ridge-and-Valley western portion of the county and the Copper Basin.

=== Adjacent counties ===
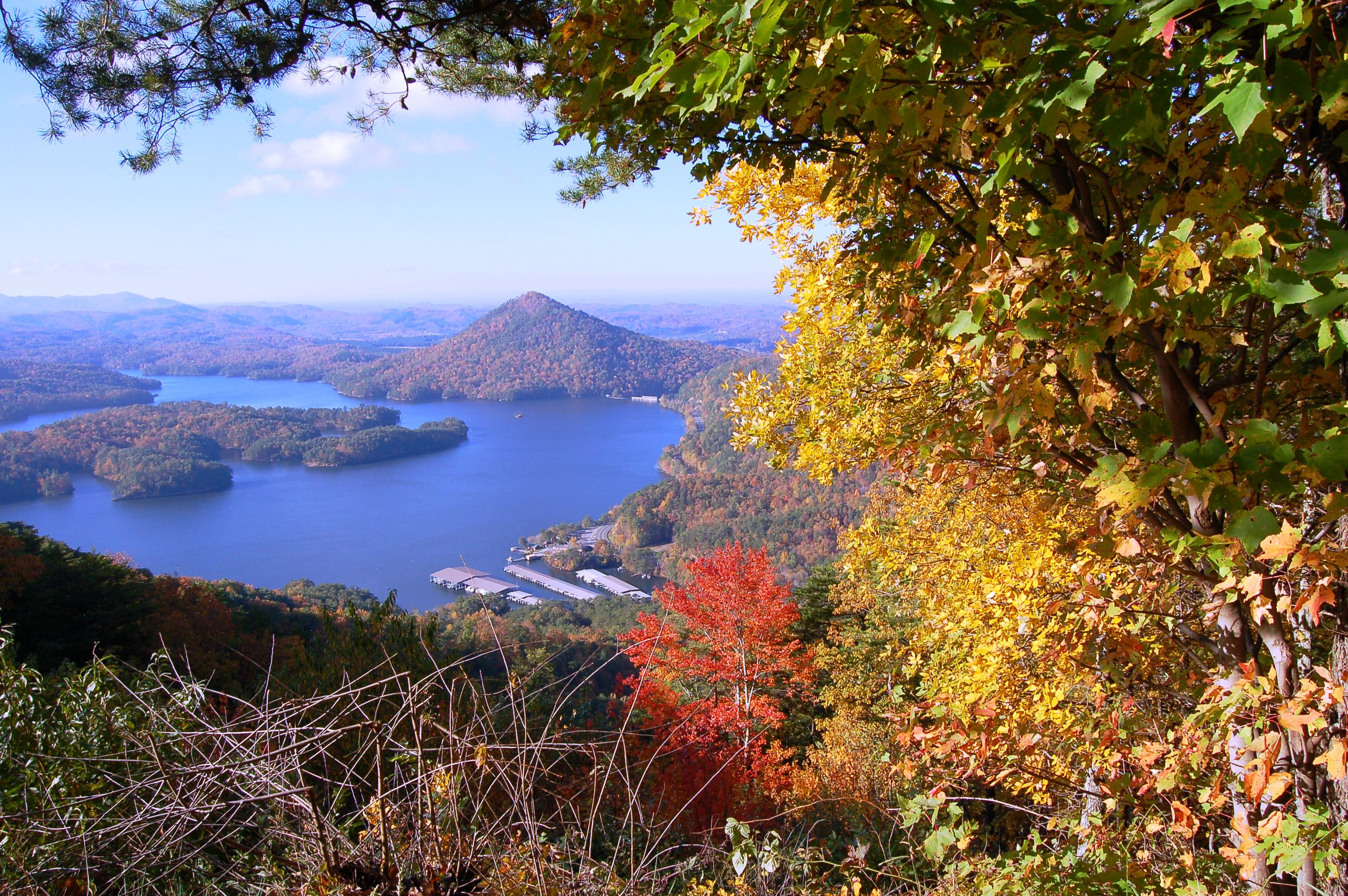
View from the Ocoee Scenic Byway

- Monroe County (northeast)
- Cherokee County, North Carolina (east)
- Fannin County, Georgia (southeast)
- Murray County, Georgia (southwest)
- Bradley County (west)
- McMinn County (northwest)

=== National protected areas ===
- Big Frog Wilderness (part)
- Cherokee National Forest (part)

=== State protected areas ===
- William L. Davenport Refuge
- Ducktown Basin Museum and Burra Burra Mine (state historic site)
- Fourth Fractional Township Wildlife Management Area
- Hiwassee/Ocoee Scenic River State Park

== Demographics ==
Historical population
Census	Pop.	Note	%±
1840	3,570		—
1850	6,338		77.5%
1860	8,726		37.7%
1870	7,369		−15.6%
1880	7,269		−1.4%
1890	8,361		15.0%
1900	11,357		35.8%
1910	14,116		24.3%
1920	14,243		0.9%
1930	15,686		10.1%
1940	15,473		−1.4%
1950	14,074		−9.0%
1960	12,160		−13.6%
1970	11,669		−4.0%
1980	13,602		16.6%
1990	13,643		0.3%
2000	16,050		17.6%
2010	16,825		4.8%
2020	17,544		4.3%
2025 (est.)	18,592	▲	6.0%
U.S. Decennial Census; 1790-1960 1900-1990; 1990-2000 2010-2014

=== Racial and ethnic composition ===
Polk County, Tennessee – Racial and ethnic composition Note: the US Census treats Hispanic/Latino as an ethnic category. This table excludes Latinos from the racial categories and assigns them to a separate category. Hispanics/Latinos may be of any race.
Race / Ethnicity (NH = Non-Hispanic)	Pop 1980	Pop 1990	Pop 2000	Pop 2010	Pop 2020	% 1980	% 1990	% 2000	% 2010	% 2020
White alone (NH)	13,519	13,540	15,689	16,262	16,313	99.39%	99.25%	97.75%	96.65%	92.98%
Black or African American alone (NH)	5	0	22	50	61	0.04%	0.00%	0.14%	0.30%	0.35%
Native American or Alaska Native alone (NH)	13	25	39	57	59	0.10%	0.18%	0.24%	0.34%	0.34%
Asian alone (NH)	10	42	19	23	33	0.07%	0.31%	0.12%	0.14%	0.19%
Native Hawaiian or Pacific Islander alone (NH)	x	x	3	1	10	x	x	0.02%	0.01%	0.06%
Other race alone (NH)	7	0	2	3	23	0.05%	0.00%	0.01%	0.02%	0.13%
Mixed race or Multiracial (NH)	x	x	159	196	748	x	x	0.99%	1.16%	4.26%
Hispanic or Latino (any race)	48	36	117	233	297	0.35%	0.26%	0.73%	1.38%	1.69%
Total	13,602	13,643	16,050	16,825	17,544	100.00%	100.00%	100.00%	100.00%	100.00%

=== 2020 census ===
As of the 2020 census, there were 17,544 people and 5,239 families residing in the county. The median age was 46.8 years; 18.8% of residents were under the age of 18 and 22.0% were 65 years of age or older. For every 100 females there were 99.5 males, and for every 100 females age 18 and over there were 98.9 males age 18 and over.

The racial makeup of the county was 93.7% White, 0.4% Black or African American, 0.4% American Indian and Alaska Native, 0.2% Asian, 0.1% Native Hawaiian and Pacific Islander, 0.7% from some other race, and 4.7% from two or more races. Hispanic or Latino residents of any race comprised 1.7% of the population.

<0.1% of residents lived in urban areas, while 100.0% lived in rural areas.

There were 7,160 households in the county, of which 26.1% had children under the age of 18 living in them. Of all households, 51.9% were married-couple households, 19.0% were households with a male householder and no spouse or partner present, and 23.3% were households with a female householder and no spouse or partner present. About 26.7% of all households were made up of individuals and 12.9% had someone living alone who was 65 years of age or older.

There were 8,561 housing units, of which 16.4% were vacant. Among occupied housing units, 78.8% were owner-occupied and 21.2% were renter-occupied. The homeowner vacancy rate was 1.8% and the rental vacancy rate was 7.5%.

=== 2010 census ===
As of the census of 2010, there were 16,825 people, 6,653 households, and 4,755 families residing in the county. The population density was 38.7 people per square mile (14.9 people/km^{2}). There were 7,991 housing units at an average density of 18.4 per square mile (7.1/km^{2}). The racial makeup of the county was 97.53% White, 0.38% Native American, 0.30% African American, 0.14% Asian, 0.02% Pacific Islander, and 1.21% from two or more races. Those of Hispanic or Latino origins, regardless of race, constituted 1.38% of the population.

There were 6,653 households, out of which 26.10% had children under the age of 18 living with them, 56.60% were married couples living together, 9.00% had a female householder with no husband present, and 26.30% were non-families. 25.0% of all households were made up of individuals, and 11.20% had someone living alone who was 65 years of age or older. The average household size was 2.49 and the average family size was 2.96.

In the county, the population was spread out, with 22.14% under the age of 18, 5.0% from 20 to 24, 10.20% from 25 to 34, 21.60% from 35 to 49, 21.70% from 50 to 64, and 17.10% who were 65 years of age or older. The median age was 42.5 years.

=== 2000 census ===
In 2000, the median income for a household in the county was $29,643, and the median income for a family was $36,370. Males had a median income of $27,703 versus $21,010 for females. The per capita income for the county was $16,025. About 9.70% of families and 13.00% of the population were below the poverty line, including 13.80% of those under age 18 and 18.40% of those age 65 or over.

== Economy ==
For most of its history, the mines in the Copper Basin were the largest source of employment in Polk County. As the copper mining industry began to decline, tourism associated with the Ocoee and Hiwassee Rivers began to overtake the copper mines as the largest industry in the county. The first rafting company on the Hiwassee was established in 1969. The shutdown of Ocoee Dam No. 2 to repair the flume line in September 1976 first made possible the rafting of the river's rapids, and several rafting companies were established during this time up until 1983, when the reconstruction was complete. Before the reconstruction project was complete, a struggle ensued between TVA and the rafting companies over usage of the river, which culminated in a 1984 agreement with TVA to schedule periodic releases of water through the dam at certain times of the year to allow for whitewater rafting. This agreement, set to expire in 2019, was renewed in 2017. During the same time, commercial rafting of the Hiwassee also greatly increased. Today, tourism associated with rafting, kayaking, and canoeing the Hiwassee and Ocoee Rivers is the largest sector of Polk County's economy, drawing more than 250,000 people to the area annually. The Ocoee River is now the most rafted river in the United States, with about 250,000 visitors annually, and more than 100,000 people raft the Hiwaseee River each year. Both rivers are ranked as two of the most visited tourist attractions in Tennessee.

== Education ==
Public schools in Polk County are operated by the Polk County Schools district. High Schools include Copper Basin High School and Polk County High School. The district has one middle school, Chilhowee Middle. The district also has three elementary schools, Benton Elementary, South Polk Elementary and Copper Basin Elementary.

== Communities ==
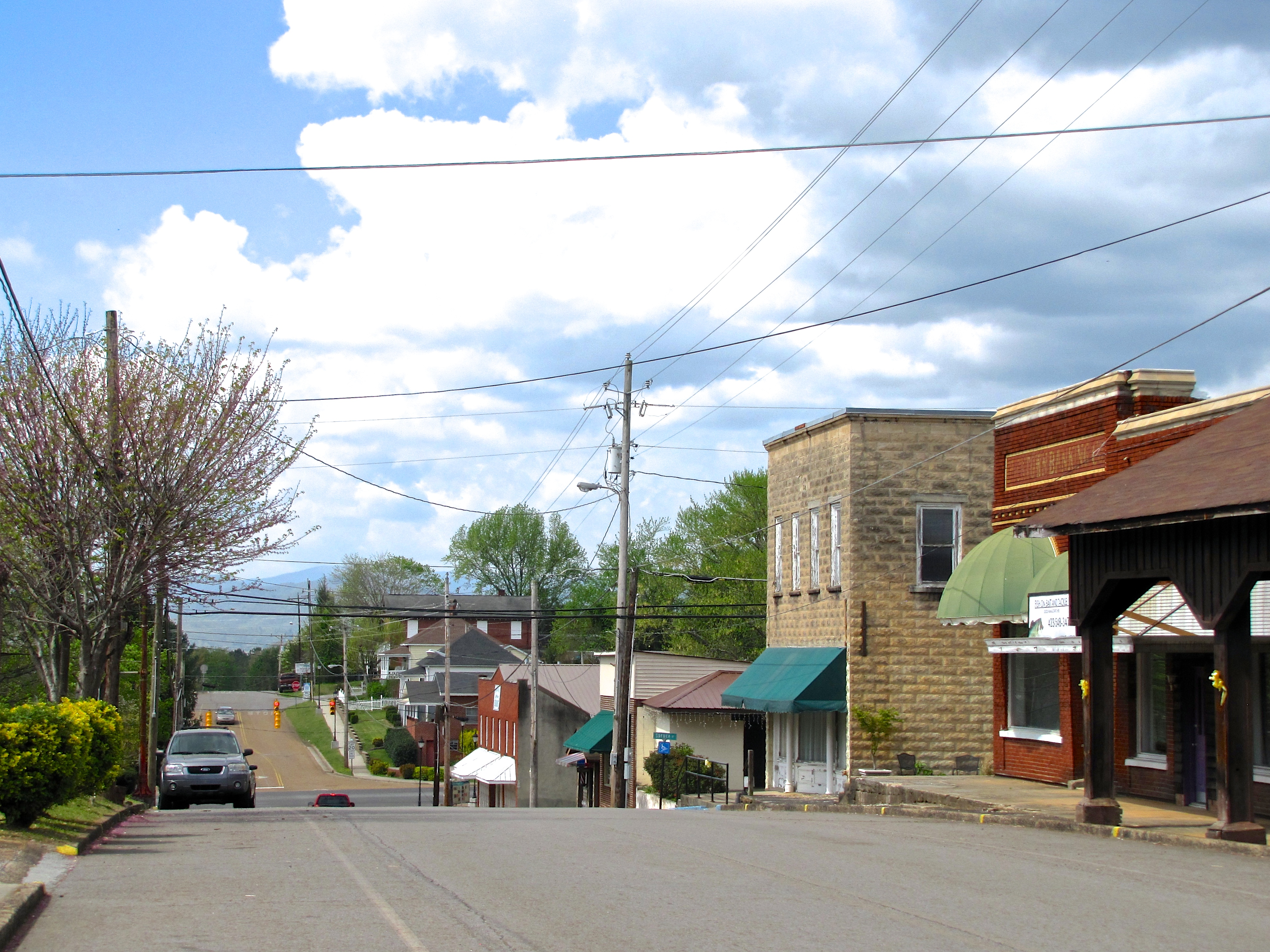
Ducktown

=== Cities ===
- Copperhill
- Ducktown

=== Town ===
- Benton (county seat)

=== Census-designated places ===
- Conasauga
- Delano (shared with McMinn County)
- Farner
- Ocoee

=== Unincorporated communities ===
- Ball Play
- Belltown
- Benton Springs
- Benton Station
- Harbuck
- Oldfort
- Parksville
- Reliance
- Turtletown
- Isabella
- Postelle
- Dogtown
- Cherokee Hills
- Grassy Creek
- Tumbling Creek
- Newtown
- Coletown

== Politics ==
United States presidential election results for Polk County, Tennessee
Year	Republican		Democratic		Third party(ies)	
Year	No.	%	No.	%	No.	%
1912	533	26.24%	867	42.69%	631	31.07%
1916	887	53.08%	767	45.90%	17	1.02%
1920	1,018	56.21%	775	42.79%	18	0.99%
1924	1,247	51.30%	1,150	47.31%	34	1.40%
1928	1,760	63.22%	1,012	36.35%	12	0.43%
1932	1,642	39.26%	2,540	60.74%	0	0.00%
1936	1,755	43.21%	2,283	56.20%	24	0.59%
1940	562	13.47%	3,611	86.53%	0	0.00%
1944	378	7.23%	4,842	92.65%	6	0.11%
1948	1,529	51.14%	1,412	47.22%	49	1.64%
1952	2,283	55.63%	1,821	44.37%	0	0.00%
1956	2,136	58.22%	1,533	41.78%	0	0.00%
1960	2,187	58.30%	1,532	40.84%	32	0.85%
1964	1,685	44.37%	2,113	55.63%	0	0.00%
1968	1,808	45.02%	1,454	36.21%	754	18.77%
1972	2,285	60.58%	1,431	37.94%	56	1.48%
1976	1,835	35.60%	3,284	63.71%	36	0.70%
1980	2,414	48.67%	2,470	49.80%	76	1.53%
1984	2,785	56.15%	2,112	42.58%	63	1.27%
1988	2,297	52.31%	2,073	47.21%	21	0.48%
1992	1,584	34.36%	2,583	56.03%	443	9.61%
1996	1,910	40.04%	2,450	51.36%	410	8.60%
2000	2,907	51.97%	2,574	46.01%	113	2.02%
2004	3,924	58.57%	2,724	40.66%	52	0.78%
2008	4,267	65.64%	2,124	32.67%	110	1.69%
2012	4,108	67.80%	1,856	30.63%	95	1.57%
2016	5,097	78.17%	1,252	19.20%	171	2.62%
2020	6,792	81.24%	1,492	17.85%	76	0.91%
2024	7,302	83.67%	1,356	15.54%	69	0.79%

Like East Tennessee, Polk has always leaned Republican, though to a lesser extent than most counties in the region. However, during the Great Depression and World War II, this changed drastically, with Polk County giving 92.7% of the vote to Franklin D. Roosevelt in 1944 (it swung hard to the GOP between 1944 and 1948). Today, Polk County is very conservative, giving over 80% of its popular vote to Donald Trump in 2024.

== Transportation ==
=== Highways ===
- US-64
- US-74
- US-411
- SR-40
- SR-30
- SR-68
- SR-74
- SR-123
- SR-163
- SR-313
- SR-314
- SR-315

=== Air ===
Polk County is served by Martin Campbell Field, a general aviation airport. The Chilhowee Gliderport is an FAA-licensed gliderport located near Benton.

== Notable people ==
- Stan Beaver, musician.
- Landrum Bolling, journalist.
- Joel Eaves, basketball coach.
- G. Earl Guinn, university president.
- Elizabeth Hamer Kegan, librarian.
- John E. Hutton, U.S. representative.
- J. Chris Newton, politician.

== See also ==
- National Register of Historic Places listings in Polk County, Tennessee
