= Benton, Tennessee =

- Town
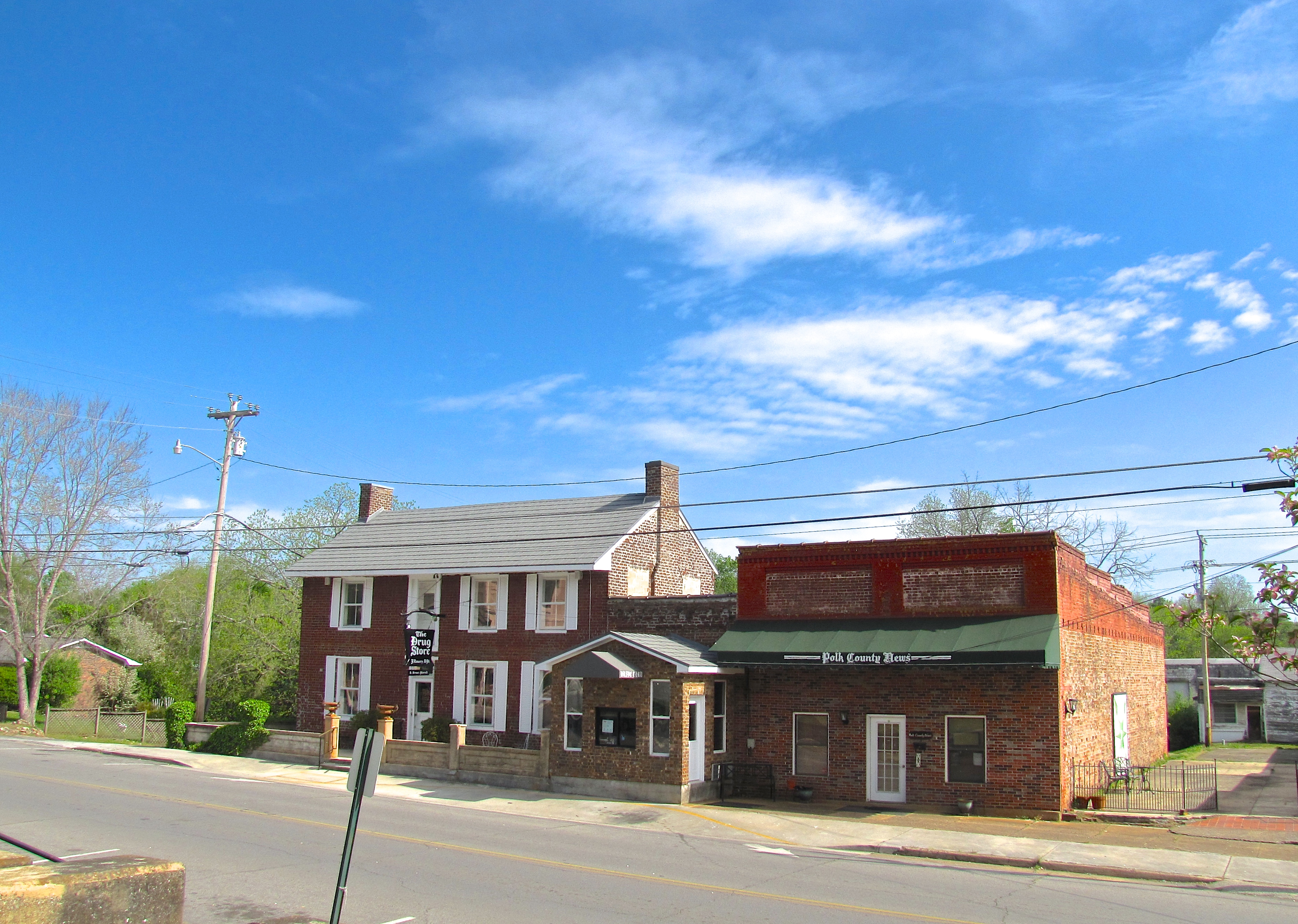
- The Drug Store (left) and Polk County News block in Benton

- Location of Benton in Polk County, Tennessee.
- Coordinates: 35°10′27″N 84°39′13″W
- Country: United States
- State: Tennessee
- County: Polk
- Founded: 1840
- Incorporated: 1915
- Named for: Thomas Hart Benton

Area
  - Total: 3.03 sq mi (7.85 km^{2})
  - Land: 3.03 sq mi (7.85 km^{2})
  - Water: 0 sq mi (0.00 km^{2})
- Elevation: 741 ft (226 m)

Population (2020)
  - Total: 1,523
  - Density: 502/sq mi (193.9/km^{2})
- Time zone: UTC-5 (Eastern (EST))
  - Summer (DST): UTC-4 (EDT)
- ZIP code: 37307
- Area code: 423
- FIPS code: 47-05040
- GNIS feature ID: 1327567

Benton is a town in Polk County, Tennessee, United States. The population was 1,532 at the 2020 census. It is the county seat of Polk County.

Benton is included in the Cleveland, Tennessee Metropolitan Statistical Area.

== History ==
Benton was founded in 1840 as a county seat for Polk County, which had been established the previous year. The town, originally a trading post known as McKamy's stock stand, was named in honor of politician and US Senator from Missouri, Thomas Hart Benton.

Nancy Ward, a Cherokee known as Nanyehi, was a Beloved Woman, a leader among her people. For many years, she participated in negotiations with the British and Americans. After the American Revolution, she had an inn here and was finally buried here. The Nancy Ward Chapter of the DAR, named in her honor, has marked the graves of her and her son Fivekiller.

On May 27, 1983, the Benton fireworks disaster occurred on a farm southeast of the city. An explosion at a secret fireworks operation killed eleven, injured one, and caused damage within a radius of several miles, revealing the illegal business. This was by far the largest and most successful known illegal fireworks operation. The blast was heard more than 20 mi (32 km) away.

== Geography ==
Benton is located at 35°10′27″N 84°39′13″W (35.1742411, -84.6535468). The town is situated just southeast of the confluence of the Ocoee River and the Hiwassee River, roughly 34 miles (55 km) upstream from the latter's mouth along the Chickamauga Lake impoundment of the Tennessee River. The Unicoi Mountains rise prominently to the east of Benton.

Benton is centered on the junction of U.S. Route 411, which connects the town to Etowah to the north and Tennga, Georgia to the south, and Tennessee State Route 314, which connects Benton to Parksville, Cherokee National Forest, and the Ocoee Dam area to the southeast. Benton is located approximately 20 miles (32 km) east of Interstate 75.

According to the United States Census Bureau, the town has a total area of 2.3 square miles (6.0 km^{2}), all land.

One of the scenic areas around Benton is Lake McCamy, where a hiking trail leads to the Benton Falls.

== Demographics ==
Historical population
Census	Pop.	Note	%±
1870	250		—
1880	183		−26.8%
1890	165		−9.8%
1960	638		—
1970	749		17.4%
1980	1,115		48.9%
1990	992		−11.0%
2000	1,138		14.7%
2010	1,385		21.7%
2020	1,523		10.0%

=== 2020 census ===
Benton racial composition
Race	Number	Percentage
White (non-Hispanic)	1,418	93.11%
Black or African American (non-Hispanic)	5	0.33%
Native American	8	0.53%
Asian	1	0.07%
Pacific Islander	1	0.07%
Other/Mixed	61	4.01%
Hispanic or Latino	29	1.9%

As of the 2020 United States census, there were 1,523 people, 645 households, and 438 families residing in the town.

=== 2000 census ===
As of the census of 2000, there were 1,138 people, 468 households, and 301 families residing in the town. The population density was 502.1 inhabitants per square mile (193.9/km^{2}). There were 513 housing units at an average density of 226.3 per square mile (87.4/km^{2}). The racial makeup of the town was 98.86% White, 0.09% African American, 0.18% Native American, 0.09% Pacific Islander, 0.09% from other races, and 0.70% from two or more races. Hispanic or Latino of any race were 0.53% of the population.

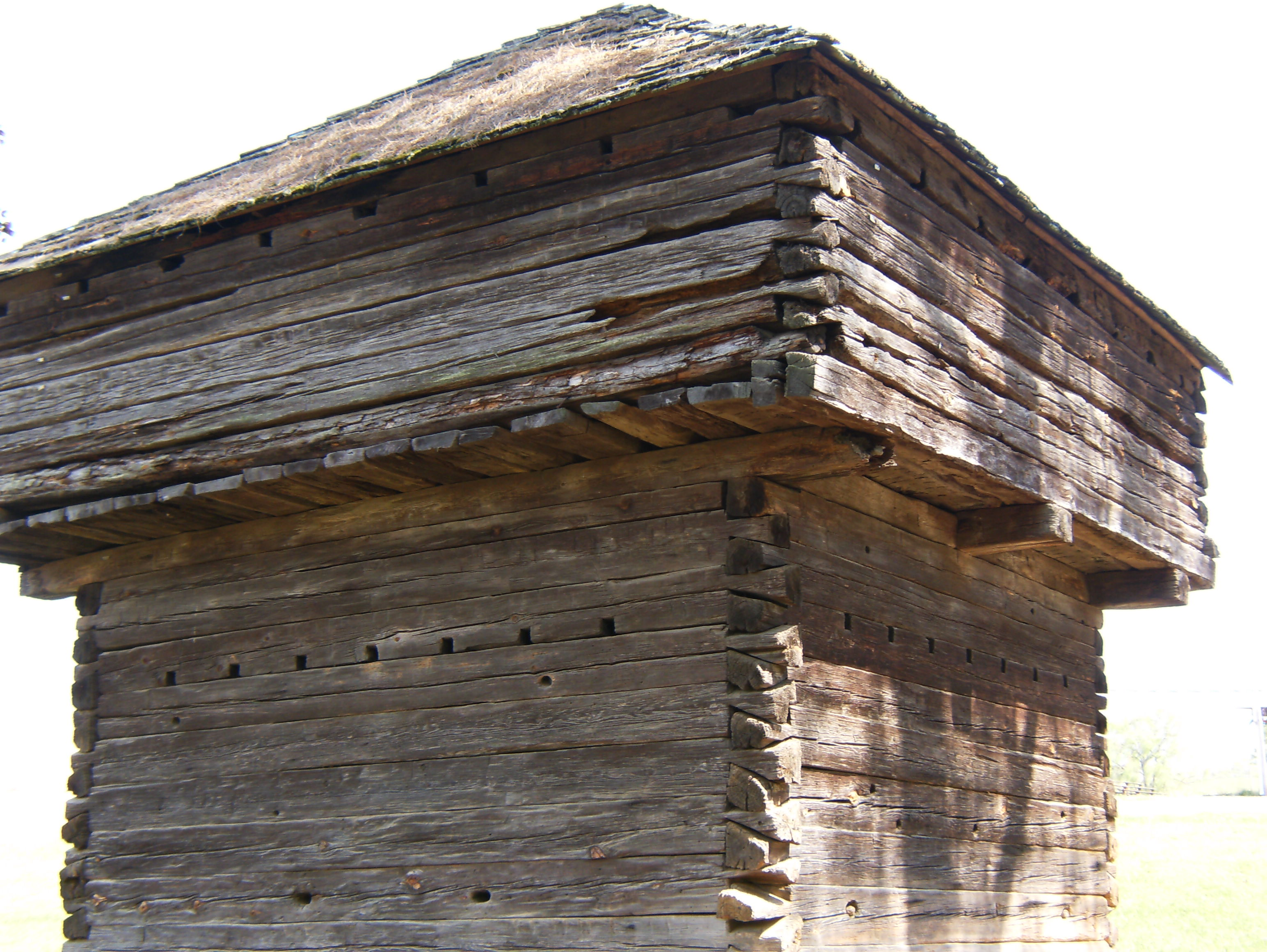
Fort Marr in Benton is the last of 23 stockades used to hold the Cherokee during the months prior to their journey to Indian Territory on the Trail of Tears.

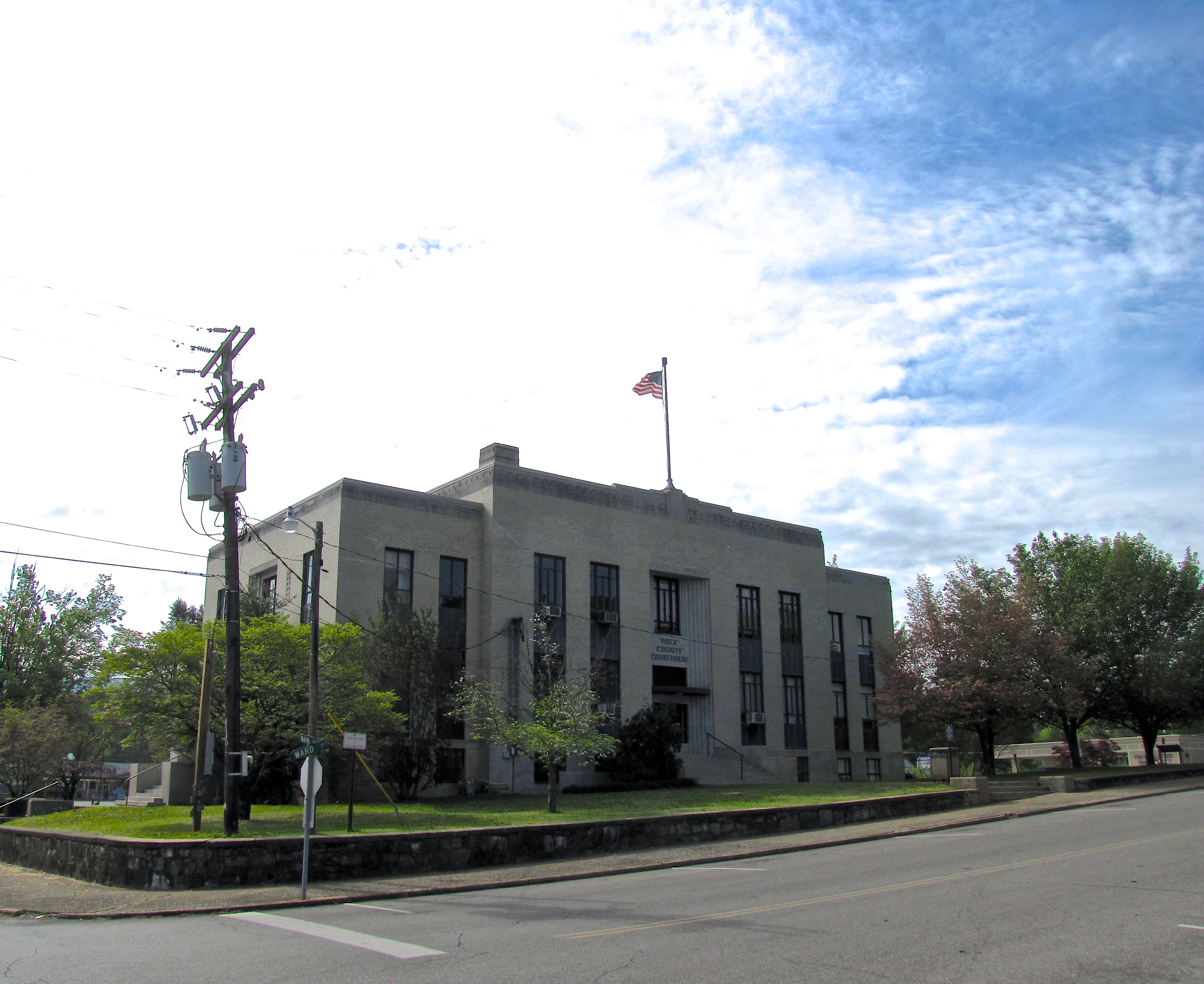
Polk County Courthouse in Benton

There were 468 households, out of which 26.5% had children under the age of 18 living with them, 47.6% were married couples living together, 12.8% had a female householder with no husband present, and 35.5% were non-families. 31.8% of all households were made up of individuals, and 14.5% had someone living alone who was 65 years of age or older. The average household size was 2.34 and the average family size was 2.95.

In the town, the population was spread out, with 22.7% under the age of 18, 11.1% from 18 to 24, 29.4% from 25 to 44, 22.6% from 45 to 64, and 14.2% who were 65 years of age or older. The median age was 37 years. For every 100 females, there were 91.6 males. For every 100 females age 18 and over, there were 92.6 males.

The median income for a household in the town was $22,667, and the median income for a family was $31,146. Males had a median income of $24,667 versus $23,295 for females. The per capita income for the town was $12,580. About 15.1% of families and 20.4% of the population were below the poverty line, including 34.5% of those under age 18 and 20.9% of those age 65 or over.
