= Jo Conn Guild =

American businessman (1887–1969)

Jo Conn Guild, Jr.
- Born: December 15, 1887; Chattanooga, Tennessee, U.S.
- Died: June 26, 1969 (aged 81); Chattanooga, Tennessee
- Occupation(s): Business, engineering
- Spouses: Sarah Lamb Nichols; May Bondurant Young
- Children: 1

Josephus Conn Guild, Jr. (December 15, 1887–June 26, 1969) was an American businessman and engineer from Chattanooga, Tennessee. As president of the Tennessee Electric Power Company (TEPCO), he became one of the staunchest and most outspoken opponents of the newly formed Tennessee Valley Authority (TVA) in the 1930s. With the help of attorney Wendell Willkie, Guild waged a legal battle that questioned the constitutionality of TVA, culminating in a U.S. Supreme Court case dismissal that forced TEPCO to sell its assets to the new federal agency.

Working for his father's Chattanooga and Tennessee River Power Company as a young engineer in the early 1900s, Guild helped build Hales Bar Dam, the first dam on the main channel of the Tennessee River and the first hydroelectric dam on a navigable channel in the United States. After his father's death, he helped the company expand, eventually merging it with several other companies to form TEPCO in 1922. Guild served as vice-president of TEPCO throughout the 1920s, and by the time he was named president in 1933, the company was the state's largest electric power company, controlling plants such as Hales Bar Dam, Ocoee dams No. 1 and No. 2, Blue Ridge Dam, and Great Falls Dam. Although eventually forced to sell TEPCO's power division, Guild continued operating the company's streetcar holdings, eventually transforming these holdings into the Southern Coach bus lines.

== Biography ==
=== Early life ===
Guild was born in Chattanooga in 1887, the son of Josephus Conn Guild, Sr. (1862–1907) and Mary Orr. Guild's grandfather, George Guild, served as mayor of Nashville in the early 1890s, and his namesake great-grandfather Josephus Conn Guild (1802–1883) was a prominent Sumner County judge and author. The name "Conn" was the maiden name of Guild's great-great-grandmother (Judge Guild's mother), Elizabeth Conn. Guild's father, who moved to Chattanooga in 1885, has been described as "the most capable engineer of his day." In the 1890s, he designed the Lookout Mountain Incline Railway, which at the time of its construction was the steepest railway in the world.

Guild attended the Baylor School (his father was a friend of the school's founder) from 1897 to 1905, after which he received technical training at the University of Virginia and studied engineering at Vanderbilt. In 1904, Guild accompanied his father and his father's business partner Charles James to what would eventually be the Hales Bar Dam site, where they met with Nicholas Brady (son of New York financier Anthony N. Brady) and utilities expert Thomas E. Murray to secure funding for the dam's construction. Guild, Sr. and James established the Chattanooga & Tennessee River Power Company that same year to oversee the dam's construction.

=== TEPCO and TVA ===
After receiving his engineering degree in 1909, Guild joined his late father's company and aided in the completion of Hales Bar Dam. The dam went into operation in November 1913, after which the title was turned over to the federal government, with Chattanooga & Tennessee Power retaining rights to the power generation profits for 99 years. In 1915, Guild was named Chattanooga & Tennessee Power's general manager, and in 1922 he helped oversee the merger of several Tennessee power firms to form the Tennessee Electric Power Company (TEPCO). The merger included Chattanooga & Tennessee Power, the Tennessee Power Company (which had built Great Falls Dam on the Caney Fork in 1917), and the E.W. Clark & Co. subsidiaries Chattanooga Railway & Light (which controlled Chattanooga's street lights and street cars) and the East Tennessee Power Company (which had built Ocoee dams 1 and 2 on the Ocoee River). In the 1920s, with Guild as its vice president, TEPCO expanded rapidly, eventually acquiring control of 45 Tennessee power and utilities firms. Blue Ridge Dam, which was advanced enough to require just six employees for its operations, was completed in the early 1930s by a TEPCO subsidiary. In 1933, Guild was selected as TEPCO's president.

As part of President Roosevelt's New Deal initiatives, the federal government created the TVA in 1933. TVA was given oversight of the entire Tennessee River watershed and the power to use eminent domain to seize privately owned dams in the watershed. Guild vehemently opposed the agency's creation. In 1936, after the U.S. Supreme Court ruled in favor of TVA in the Ashwander case, TEPCO and several other private firms sued TVA, challenging the agency's constitutionality. The private utilities were represented by Wendell Willkie (Willkie's Commonwealth & Southern Corporation owned interests in several of the power firms) and Newton D. Baker, while TVA was represented by attorneys James Lawrence Fly and John Lord O'Brian. The federal district court ruled in favor of the private utilities, but the decision was overturned by the Court of Appeals in early 1938. The private utilities appealed to the U.S. Supreme Court, which dismissed the suit in January 1939, claiming the utilities lacked standing. On August 15, 1939, TEPCO sold its assets to TVA for $78 million.

=== Later life ===
Guild retained control of TEPCO's Chattanooga street car division, which he reorganized as Southern Coach Lines in 1941. The company operated street cars until 1946, when it focused on bus travel. Guild retired as company president in 1961. The company was purchased by the Chattanooga Area Regional Transportation Authority in 1973.

Guild owned a large house on Lookout Mountain, and even in his later years, it was not uncommon to see Guild driving down the mountain in one of his custom-made sports cars. Guild also owned a 320-acre (130 ha) cattle and hog farm near Columbia, Tennessee, where he cured hams and sausages using old family recipes. Guild married his first wife, Sarah Nichols, in 1912, and they had one daughter, Virginia (1915–2001). Guild died on June 26, 1969, and is buried in the Forest Hills Cemetery.
