= Tennessee State Route 314 =

Highway in Tennessee

State Route 314
- Parksville Road
- SR 314 highlighted in red

Route information
- Maintained by TDOT
- Length: 6.1 mi (9.8 km)
- Existed: July 1, 1983–present

Major junctions
- South end: US 64 / US 74 in Parksville
- North end: US 411 in Benton

Location
- Country: United States
- State: Tennessee
- Counties: Polk

Highway system
- Tennessee State Routes; Interstate; US; State
← SR 313	→ SR 315

State Route 314 (SR 314), also known as Parksville Road, is a 6.1-mile-long (9.8 km) state highway in Polk County, Tennessee, connecting the town of Benton with the community of Parksville and the Cherokee National Forest.

== Route description ==
SR 314 begins in Parksville at an intersection with US 64/US 74 (Ocoee Scenic Byway/SR 40) just north of Ocoee Dam No. 1 (Parksville Dam). It goes north through farmland along the western edge of the Cherokee National Forest before curving to the west and entering Benton. SR 314 then comes to an end at an intersection with US 411 (SR 33). The entire route of SR 314 is a two-lane Highway.

== Major intersections ==
The entire route is in Polk County.

Location	mi	km	Destinations	Notes
Parksville	0.0	0.0	US 64 / US 74 (Ocoee Scenic Byway/SR 40) – Cleveland, Ocoee, Ducktown	Southern terminus; provides access to Cherokee National Forest and Ocoee Dam No. 1, Ocoee Dam No. 2, and Ocoee Dam No. 3
Benton	6.1	9.8	US 411 (SR 33) – Ocoee, Etowah	Northern terminus
1.000 mi = 1.609 km; 1.000 km = 0.621 mi
