= Blue Ridge Dam =

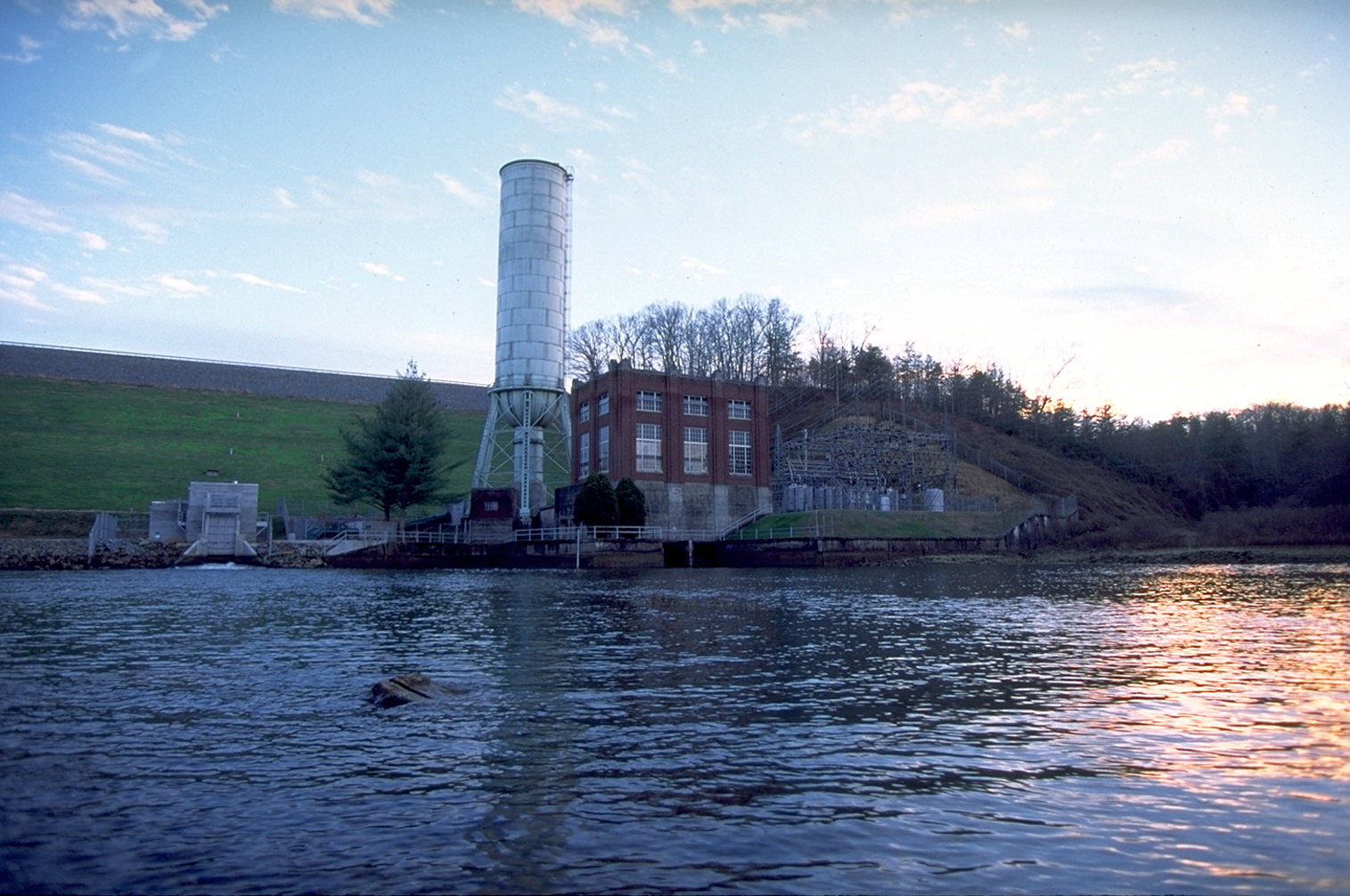
- Official name: Blue Ridge Dam
- Location: Fannin County, Georgia, U.S.
- Coordinates: 34°52′57″N 84°16′48″W
- Construction began: 1925
- Opening date: July 31, 1931
- Operator: Tennessee Valley Authority

Dam and spillways
- Impounds: Toccoa River
- Height: 167 feet (51 m)
- Length: 1,000 feet (300 m)

Reservoir
- Creates: Lake Blue Ridge

Blue Ridge Dam is a hydroelectric dam on the Toccoa River in Fannin County, in the U.S. state of Georgia. It is the uppermost of four dams on the Toccoa/Ocoee River owned and operated by the Tennessee Valley Authority. The dam impounds the 3,300-acre (1,300 ha) Blue Ridge Lake on the southwestern fringe of the Blue Ridge Mountains.

== Location ==
Blue Ridge Dam is located 51 miles (82 km) upstream from the mouth of the Toccoa/Ocoee River, near the point where the states of Georgia, Tennessee, and North Carolina meet. The Toccoa River winds its way northwestward from the dam, crossing into Tennessee (where it becomes the Ocoee River) roughly 10 miles (16 km) downstream en route to the Ocoee dams on the lower part of the river. Blue Ridge Dam is 23 miles (37 km) upstream from Ocoee Dam No. 3. The Chattahoochee National Forest surrounds Blue Ridge Dam and its reservoir, and the city of Blue Ridge, Georgia is located a few miles west of the dam. U.S. Route 76 crosses a bridge just downstream from Blue Ridge Dam.

== Capacity ==
Blue Ridge Dam is a hydraulic earth-fill type dam 167 feet (51 m) high and 1,000 feet (300 m) long, and has a generating capacity of 22 megawatts. The dam's gate-controlled saddle spillway— which is separated from the main dam by a small hill— can discharge up to 55,000 cubic feet (1,600 m^{3}) of water per second. The dam's powerhouse utilizes a 192-foot (59 m) concrete intake tower, and a 14-foot (4.3 m)-diameter steel penstock 1,050 feet (320 m) long that conveys water from the tower to the primary turbine. A 180-foot (55 m) surge tank relieves pressure brought about by rapid gate closures.

Blue Ridge Lake has approximately 60 miles (97 km) of shoreline and a flood storage capacity of 68,550 acre-feet (84,560 dam^{3}). The reservoir's levels fluctuate by about 20 feet (6.1 m) in a typical year. Seasonal releases from the dam create Class I and Class II rapids on the Toccoa River for several miles downstream.

== History ==
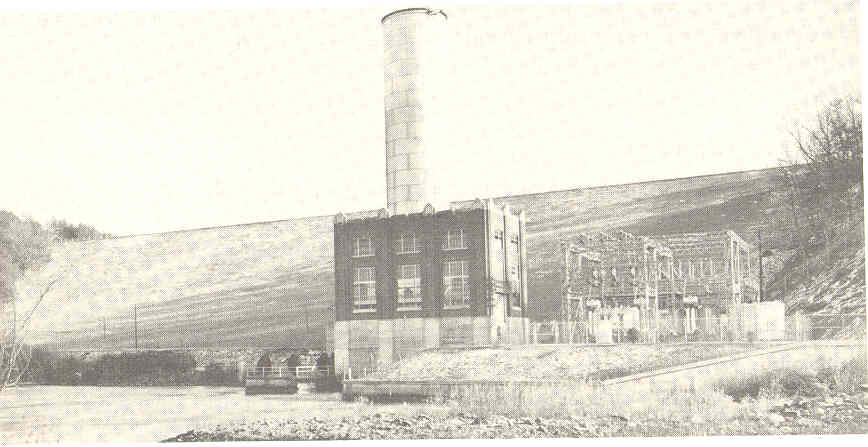
Blue Ridge Dam in the 1940s

Blue Ridge Dam was built by the Toccoa Electric Power Company, a subsidiary of the Tennessee Electric Power Company (TEPCO), which operated several hydroelectric plants in nearby Tennessee, including Ocoee Dam No. 1 and Ocoee Dam No. 2. Construction began in 1925, and the dam went into operation July 1, 1931. At the time of its completion, the dam had a generating capacity of 20 megawatts and was the most modern power dam in the TEPCO system, requiring a staff of just six employees. Subsequent upgrades have increased the dams generating capacity to 22 megawatts.

With the passage of the TVA Act in 1933, the Tennessee Valley Authority was given oversight of the Tennessee River watershed (which included the Toccoa River). TEPCO challenged the constitutionality of the TVA Act in federal court, but the U.S. Supreme Court upheld the law in 1939, and TEPCO was forced to sell its assets to TVA for $78 million in August of that year. This sum included $5 million for Blue Ridge Dam.

Soon after the dam began operations in 1931, its penstock partially collapsed. To prevent this from happening again, TVA has significantly lowered the water level in the reservoir when it conducts periodic dam inspections (approximately once every five years), which require dewatering of the penstock. A project was initiated in 2010 to repair the penstock, stabilize the intake tower base, and repair and stabilize the upstream and downstream faces of the dam, thus eliminating the future need for severe reservoir drawdowns.

In early 2025, a TVA safety report stated that Blue Ridge Dam was built in a way that makes it "vulnerable to a strong earthquake." The report said such an event could cause "significant cracks" leading to an uncontrolled release of water and "significant loss of human life." TVA said it would work to protect the public from such an event.
