= Chattanooga and Lookout Mountain Railway =

Historic railway in Tennessee, US

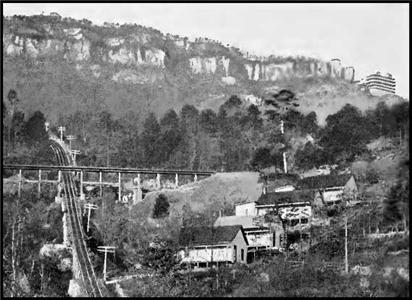
The trestle of the Chattanooga and Lookout Mountain Railway (the "Broad Gauge") passes over the Lookout Mountain Incline Railway on its way up Lookout Mountain, Tennessee.

The Chattanooga and Lookout Mountain Railway was a historic, 4 ft 8 1/2 in (1,435 mm) standard gauge railroad that operated in the southeastern United States.

The company was chartered in 1887 and started operations in 1889, running from Chattanooga, Tennessee, to the Lookout Inn, a hotel at the summit of Lookout Mountain, Tennessee.

The railroad was apparently not a financial success as it was abandoned in 1899. It was subsequently purchased by the Chattanooga Railway and Light Company and rebuilt for electric streetcar operation in 1913. Regular daily services ran on this line until 1920, when services were reduced to operating only on days that the Lookout Mountain Incline Railway was shut down for essential repairs. This substitute service ended in 1924, but the line remained in place until sometime after August 28, 1928, when mountaintop car service was discontinued.

This line should not be confused with the Lookout Mountain Incline Railway, a heritage railroad that opened in 1895 nearby, and is still in operation.
