= 2026 Toccoa/Ocoee River floods =

2026 flood in Tennessee

- Satallite Imagery of the severe storms

Meteorological history
- Date: November 5, 2026

Overall effects
- Fatalities: 0
- Injuries: several
- Missing: unknown

On November 5, 2026, heavy rainfalls in the US state of Tennessee caused the Toccoa/Ocoee River to overflow. Several cities have been flooded out, including Thunder Rock Campground.
