= Stanley Creek =

Stanley Creek may refer to:

- Stanley Creek (Toccoa River tributary), a stream in Georgia
- Stanley Creek (Missouri), a stream in Missouri
