= Chattanooga and Tennessee Electric Power Company =

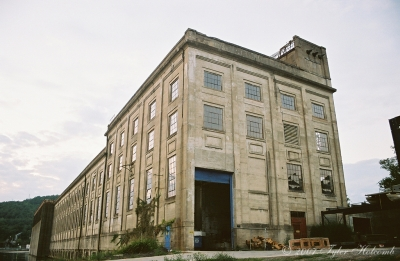
- Hales Bar Dam Powerhouse, now used as dry boat storage for Hales Bar Marina
- Industry: Hydroelectric power
- Founded: 1905
- Founders: Josephus C. Guild, Charles E. James

The Chattanooga and Tennessee Electric Power Company was formed in 1905 by Josephus C. Guild, Charles E. James and Anthony N. Brady to produce hydroelectric power and improve navigation on the Tennessee River.

Josephus Guild, a young engineer from Chattanooga, became interested in a plan drawn by Major Dan C. Kingman, the head of the local office of the Army Corps of Engineers. The plan was originally developed to control the turbulent waters below Chattanooga in the Tennessee River Gorge known as the Suck, the Pot and the Skillet. These river features, long feared by riverboat navigators, impeded trade along the waterway.

Rep. John A. Moon, a Democrat first elected in 1896, introduced a bill in 1904 that enabled the project. The bill said the construction cost would be borne by the recipient of the power franchise to be operated for 99 years and the government would hold title to the Dam.

After the city of Chattanooga failed to exercise its option on the project, Josephus Guild sought financial help from Charles James, a prominent Chattanooga businessman who was always eager to help promote the city's interests. James approached Anthony Brady, a New York financier with large interests in electrical utilities, who agreed to participate in the venture.

The Hales Bar Dam was built after Congressional action, on January 7, 1905, changed the site of the dam from Scott's Point. The cost of the dam was over $10,000,000. Josephus Guild died during the construction of the dam; his son, Jo Conn Guild, took an active role in the project. The dam was completed in 1913.

In the 1920s, the company merged with the Chattanooga Railway and Light Company and Drexel and Company, which had a competing project on the Ocoee River, to form the Tennessee Electric Power Company (TEPCO).

In 1933, Congress established the Tennessee Valley Authority (TVA) to develop the economy by a series of flood control dams on the Tennessee River and to sell the electricity generated from the dams. After the Supreme Court in 1939 dismissed a challenge to the authority of the TVA to sell electricity in the service territory of the company, TEPCO's electric system was purchased for $78,425,095 by the Tennessee Valley Authority and other participating municipal public utilities and electric cooperatives. TEPCO continued to operate as a street car company in Chattanooga and was reorganized in 1941 as Southern Coach Lines. The company operated street cars until 1946, when it focused on bus travel. The company was purchased by the Chattanooga Area Regional Transportation Authority in 1973.

== See also ==
- Electric Power Board of Chattanooga
- Memphis Light, Gas and Water
- Nashville Electric Service

== Sources ==
- Govan, Gilbert F. and Livingood, James W. (1952). The Chattanooga County 1540-1951 From Tomahawks to TVA. New York: E.P. Dutton & Co.
