= Chattanooga Area Regional Transportation Authority =

American mass transit provider in Tennessee

Chattanooga Area Regional Transportation Authority (CARTA)
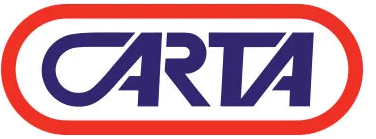

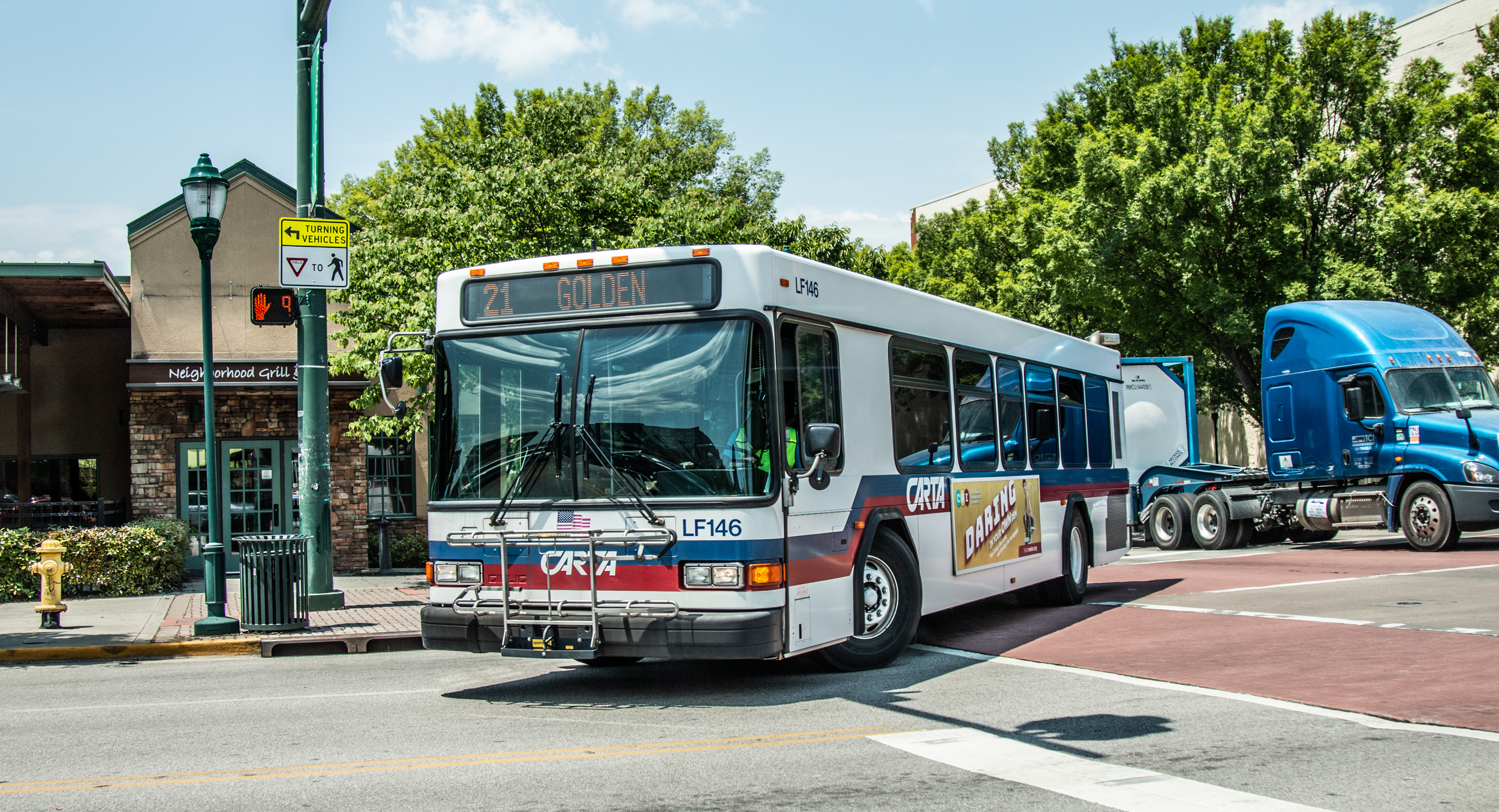
- Founded: 1973; 53 years ago
- Headquarters: Chattanooga, Tennessee
- Locale: City of Chattanooga, Hamilton County and surrounding areas
- Service type: Bus; Microtransit; Paratransit; Funicular railway
- Routes: 15
- Depots: 1617 Wilcox Blvd, Chattanooga, TN; 1362 Market St, Chattanooga, TN
- Fleet: 105
- Annual ridership: approx. 3 million
- Fuel type: Electric; Natural Gas; Diesel; Hybrid
- Chief executive: Charles D. Frazier
- Website: gocarta.org

The Chattanooga Area Regional Transportation Authority (CARTA) is the mass transit provider for Chattanooga, Tennessee and its vicinity. CARTA operates 15 bus routes, paratransit services, and the Lookout Mountain Incline Railway. CARTA also operates the Chattanooga Parking Authority, which manages public parking garages, lots, and on-street parking in the city.

== History ==
Public transportation first appeared on the streets of Chattanooga on September 4, 1875, utilizing horse-drawn trollies. The two main routes followed Market Street and East Ninth Street (now Martin Luther King Boulevard). In 1889, the trolleys were replaced with electric streetcars. With the advent of the internal combustion engine, buses began to appear more frequently. In 1941, Southern Coach Lines took over the public transit operations, and the last streetcar ran in 1946.

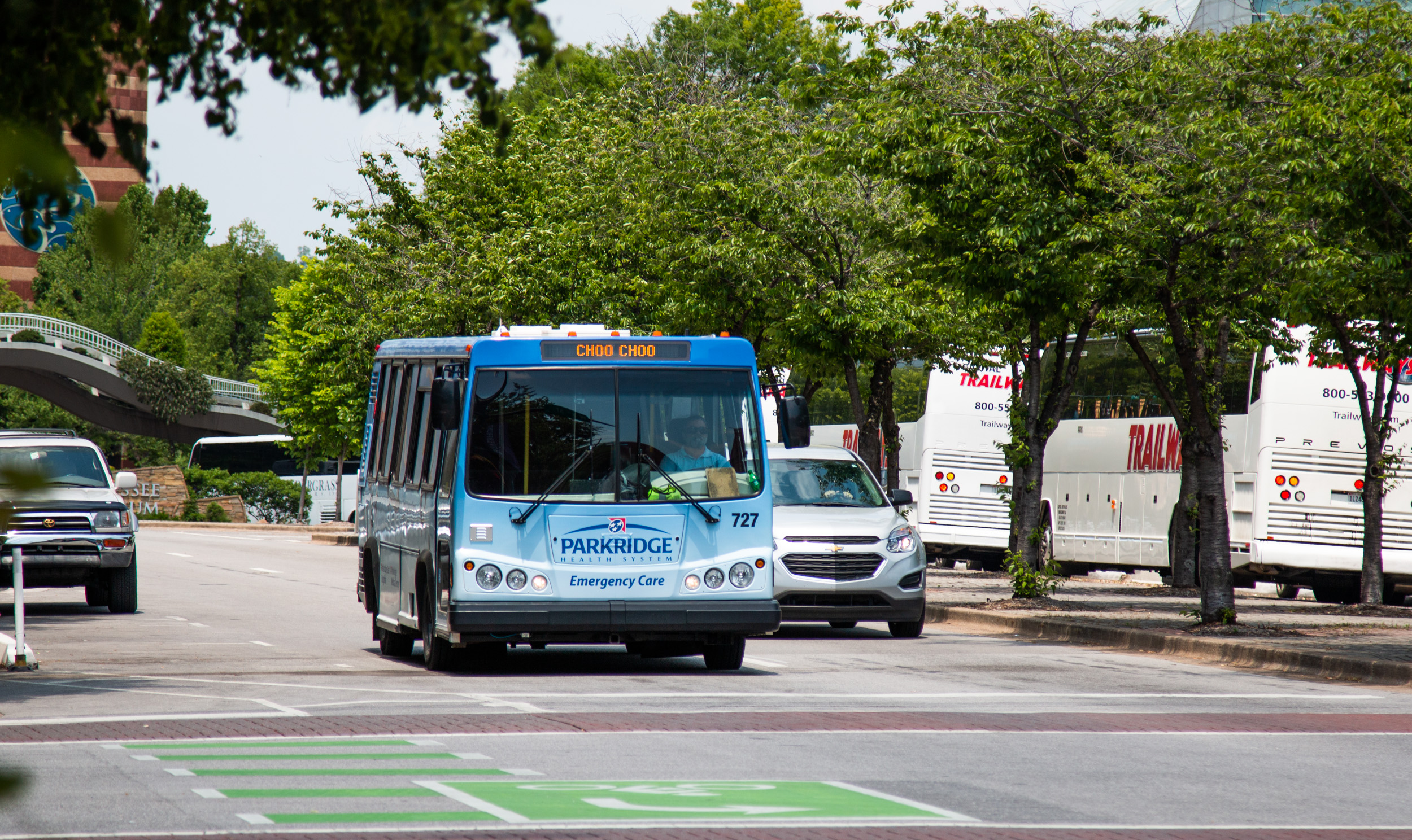
Chattanooga Choo Choo shuttle

In 1973, the City of Chattanooga purchased the assets of the former Southern Coach Lines and formed the Chattanooga Area Regional Transportation Authority. Since 1992, CARTA has operated a free downtown shuttle bus service, utilizing electric buses, which runs between the Chattanooga Choo-Choo (the former Terminal Station) and the Tennessee Aquarium.

== Services ==
=== Bus routes ===
As of May 10, 2026, CARTA operates 15 bus routes, including three classified as shuttles.

1. Alton Park
Chattanooga Choo-Choo, The Villages at Alton Park, Piney Woods, Wheeler Homes, Erlanger Community Health Center (Southside), Alton Park Recreation Center, Howard School of Academics & Technology, and Food City.
2. North Shore Shuttle
North Market Street, North Shore Market, Coolidge Park, Renaissance Park, Spears Avenue, Cherokee Boulevard, CADAS, Johnson Mental Health Center, North Chattanooga Recreation Center
4. Eastgate/Hamilton Place
UT-Chattanooga, UTC Place, Client Services Building/Human Services, Brainerd Road, Eastgate Town Center, Hamilton Place Mall, Walmart, Lee Highway, Parkridge Hospital, Warner Park
9. East Lake
Chattanooga Choo-Choo, Main Street, Dodds Avenue, Goodwill Industries, East Side Community Center, East Lake Courts, East Lake Academy of Fine Arts
10A. East Chattanooga-Avondale
UT-Chattanooga, Avondale, Erlanger Community Health Center (Dodson Ave.), Erlanger Medical Center, Hamilton County Health Department, Hardy Elementary School, Warner Park
10C. East Chattanooga-Campbell St.
UT-Chattanooga, Erlanger Medical Center, Hamilton County Health Department, Campbell Street, Highway 58, Warner Park, Erlanger Community Health Center (Dodson Ave.)
10G. East Chattanooga-Glenwood
UT-Chattanooga, Glenwood, Erlanger Medical Center, Hamilton County Health Department, Memorial Hospital, Parkwood Nursing Home, Parkridge Medical Center, Warner Park
13. Rossville
East Lake Courts, 23rd Street, Chatt Foundation, Senior Neighbors, Whiteside Faith Manor
14. Mocs Express (free shuttle)
UTC Campus, UTC Place, Engel Stadium, Downtown Chattanooga
15. St. Elmo/Incline Shuttle
St. Elmo Ave and Broad Street
16. Northgate
Northgate Mall, Hixson Pike, Riverview, Highland Plaza, Lowe's, Home Depot, Hobby Lobby, Stockdale's
21. Golden Gateway
Boynton Terrace, College Hill Courts, Chattanooga Convention Center, Jaycee Towers Apartments, Overlook Apartments, Finley Stadium
25. Enterprise South/Amnicola Highway
Hamilton County Dept. of Education, Amazon Fulfillment Center, Volkswagen Group of America, Chattanooga State Community College, Chattanooga Area Food Bank, Police Services Center
33. Downtown Shuttle
Tennessee Aquarium, Chattanooga Public Library, Chattanooga Choo-Choo

=== Incline Railway ===
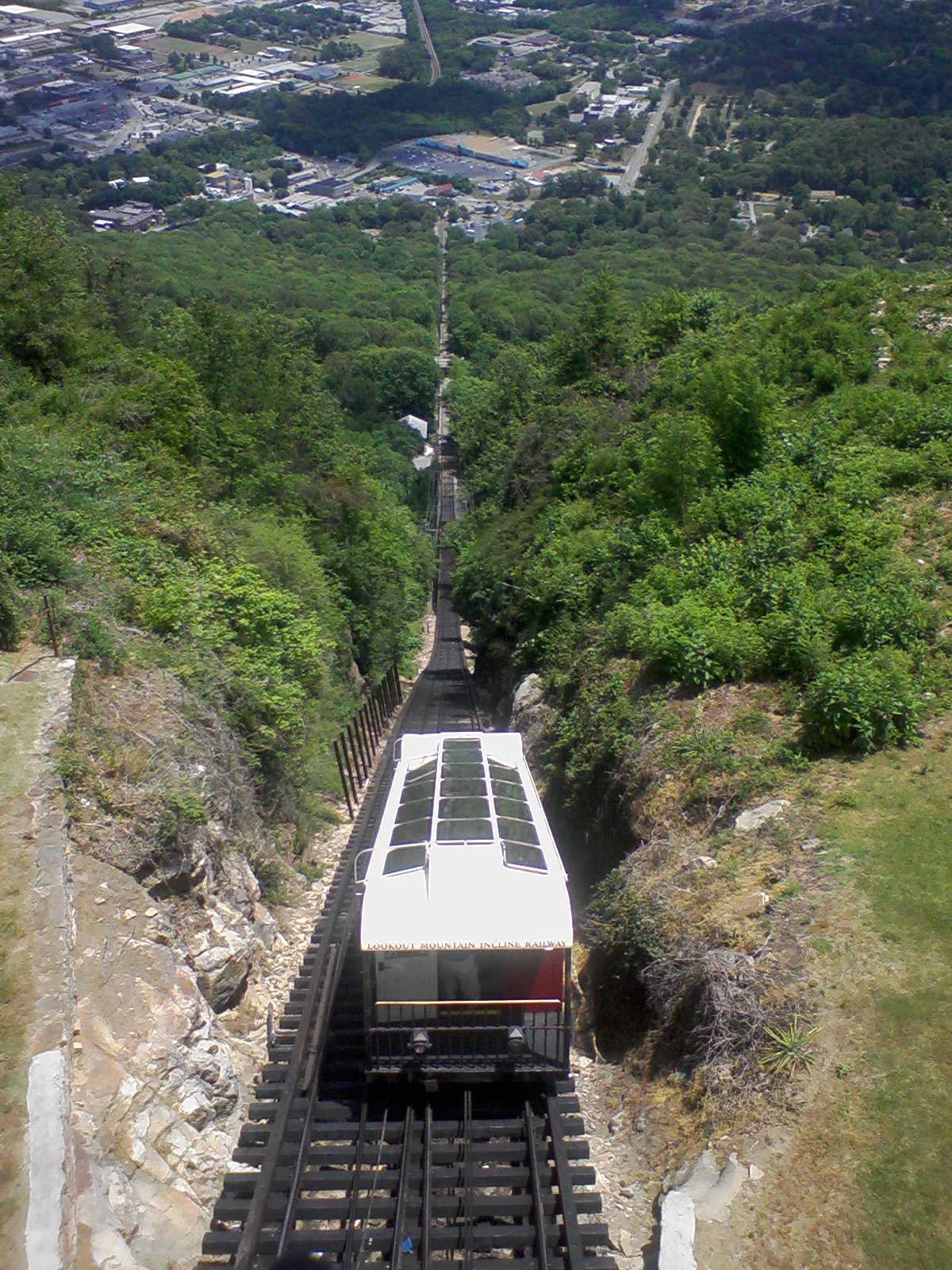
A view from the top of Lookout Mountain

CARTA owns and operates the historic Lookout Mountain Incline Railway, which ascends from the St. Elmo neighborhood to the town of Lookout Mountain, Tennessee.

=== CARTA GO ===
CARTA GO is an on-demand ride service connecting the neighborhoods of Cromwell, East Brainerd, Eastdale, and North Brainerd to the route 4 bus. The service uses software by Via Transportation for booking rides.

== Fares ==
As of 17 April 2025, base fare for fixed route buses is $1.50. Senior citizens, persons with disabilities, and Medicare users get discounted fares with a CARTA ID. Veterans and children under 5 ride for free. CARTA also offers 24-hour, 7-day, and 31-day passes. The CARTA Care-A-Van costs $3.00-$3.50 for a one-way trip. CARTA partnered with the Chattanooga Public Library to launch the Read and Ride program that allows kindergarten to 12th grade students to ride for free. Students can sign up through the library.

In December 2024, CARTA started accepting fare payment from smartphones using the Token Transit app.

CARTA GO fare is $2.00 per trip. Fares can be purchased through the CARTA GO app or with cash when boarding the vehicle.

== See also ==
- List of bus transit systems in the United States
