= Ocoee Dam No. 3 =

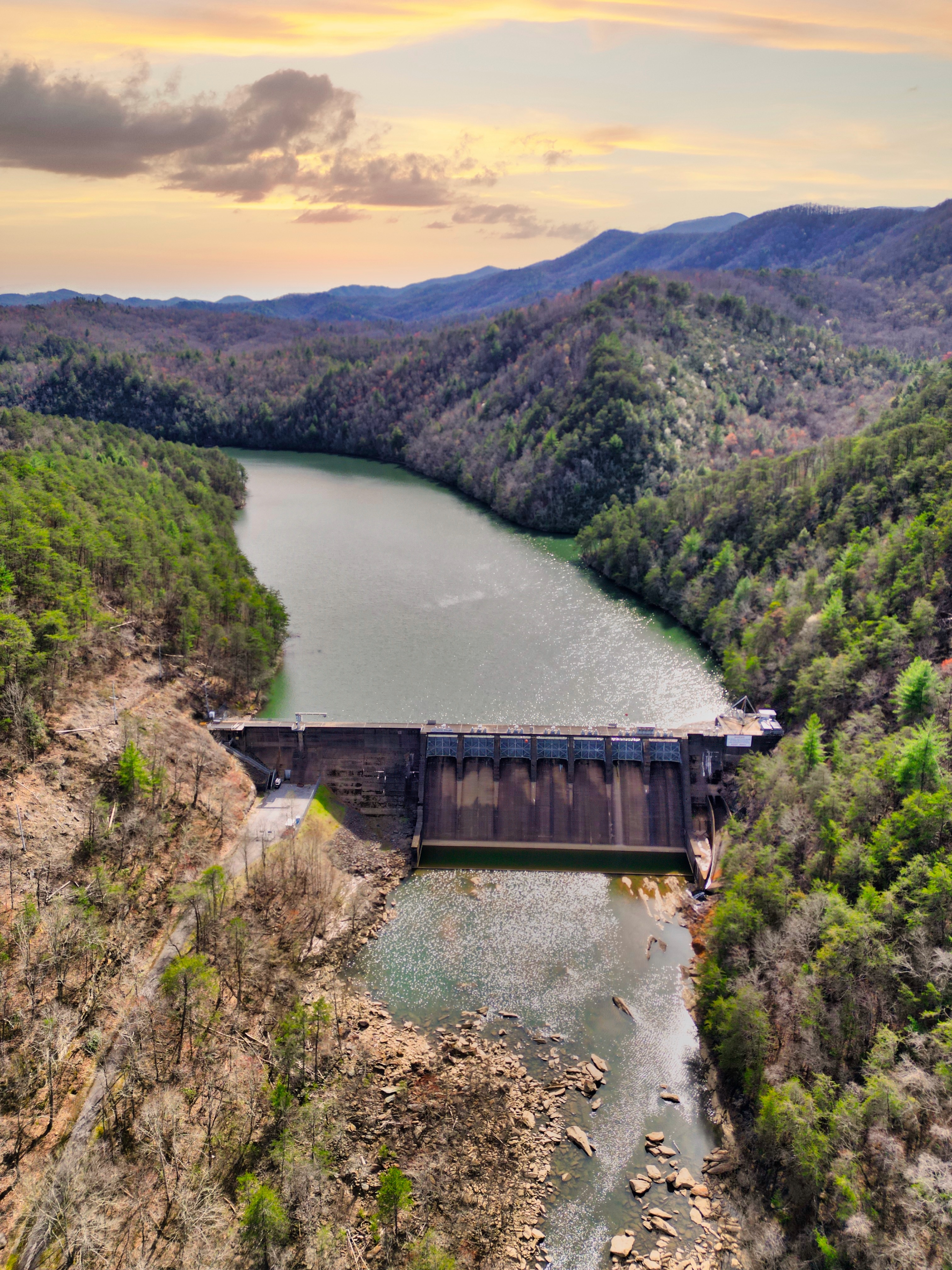
- Ocoee Dam No. 3
- Interactive map of Ocoee Dam No. 3
- Official name: Ocoee Dam Number 3
- Location: Polk County, Tennessee, U.S.
- Coordinates: 35°2′26″N 84°28′0″W
- Construction began: July 17, 1941
- Opening date: April 30, 1943
- Operator: Tennessee Valley Authority

Dam and spillways
- Impounds: Ocoee River
- Height: 110 feet (34 m)
- Length: 612 feet (187 m)

Reservoir
- Creates: Ocoee No. 3 Reservoir

Ocoee Dam No. 3 is a hydroelectric dam on the Ocoee River in Polk County, in the U.S. state of Tennessee. It is one of four dams on the Toccoa/Ocoee River owned and operated by the Tennessee Valley Authority, which built the dam in the early 1940s to meet emergency demands for electricity during World War II. The dam impounds the 360-acre (150 ha) Ocoee No. 3 Reservoir, which stretches 11 miles (18 km) upriver to the Tennessee-Georgia state line. Ocoee No. 3's powerhouse is actually located several miles downstream from the dam, and is fed by a 2.5-mile (4.0 km) conduit that carries water to it from the reservoir.

== Location ==
Ocoee Dam No. 3 is located 29 miles (47 km) above the mouth of the Ocoee River, where the river slices a deep gap between Little Frog Mountain to the north and Big Frog Mountain to the south. Both of these mountains are protected by federal wilderness areas which are adjacent to TVA's Ocoee No. 3 reservation boundary. Ocoee Dam No. 2 is just 5 miles (8.0 km) downstream, and Blue Ridge Dam is 23 miles (37 km) upstream. The Toccoa River, which flows down from its source in the Blue Ridge Mountains of northern Georgia, enters Tennessee (where it becomes the Ocoee River) approximately 11 miles (18 km) upstream from Ocoee Dam No. 3, near the Copperhill area. The Ocoee Scenic Byway— which is part of U.S. Route 64— passes just north of the dam.

== Capacity ==
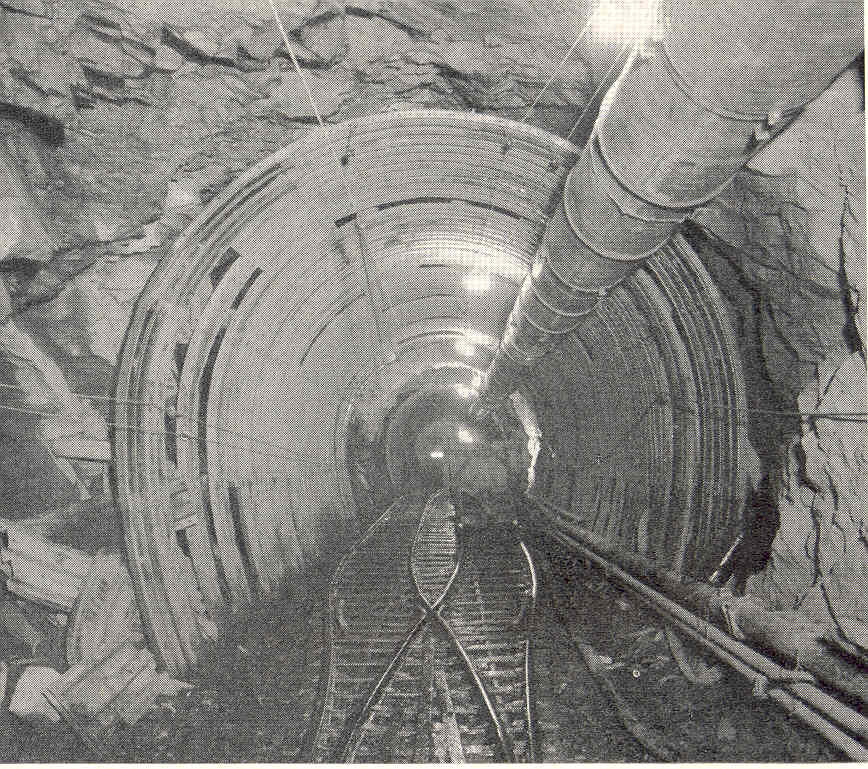
Ocoee No. 3's conduit tunnel

Ocoee Dam No. 3 is a concrete gravity diversion-type dam 110 feet (34 m) high and 612 feet (187 m) long, and has a generating capacity of 28,800 kilowatts. The dam's concrete overfall spillway has a discharge capacity of 95,000 cubic feet per second (2,700 m^{3}/s), 1,560 cubic feet (44 m^{3}) of which is via the dam's two 5-foot (1.5 m) by 7-foot (2.1 m) sluice gates located near the bottom of the dam. Ocoee Reservoir No. 3 has 360 acres (150 ha) of water surface and 24 miles (39 km) of shoreline. Major recreational releases are typically scheduled for weekends during the summer months.

The powerhouse of Ocoee No. 3 was built 4.2 miles (6.8 km) downstream from the dam in order to obtain maximum utilization of the elevation loss along this stretch of the river. A high pressure conduit— most of which flows through a 12-foot (3.7 m) by 12-foot (3.7 m) tunnel carved into the mountainside— carries the water from the reservoir at a relatively steady elevation. The water emerges from the tunnel at a point 2.5 miles (4.0 km) from the reservoir intake and drops 180 feet (55 m) through a steel penstock to the powerhouse's lone turbine.

== Background and construction ==
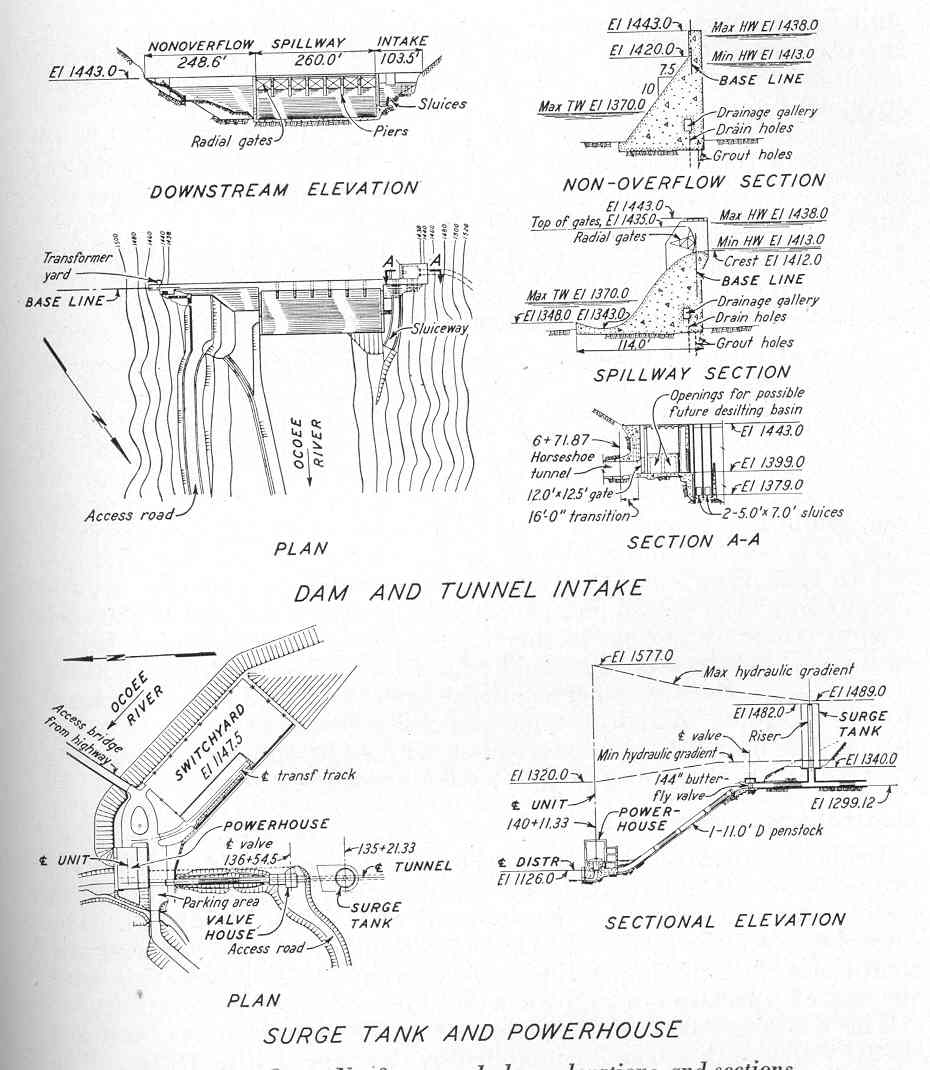
TVA's design plan for Ocoee No. 3, circa 1941

The rapid-flowing Ocoee River's hydroelectric potential has been exploited by private interests, namely the Eastern Tennessee Power Company and its successor, the Tennessee Electric Power Company (TEPCO), since the completion of Ocoee Dam No. 1 in late 1911. While only a 47-mile (76 km) stretch of river remained between Ocoee Dam No. 2 (completed in 1913) and Blue Ridge Dam (completed in 1931), this stretch's average elevation loss of 46 feet (14 m) per mile made a third dam possible. The U.S. Army Corps of Engineers had surveyed the Ocoee No. 3 dam site in the late 1920s, and TEPCO had already purchased the necessary land and water rights for the dam by the 1930s.

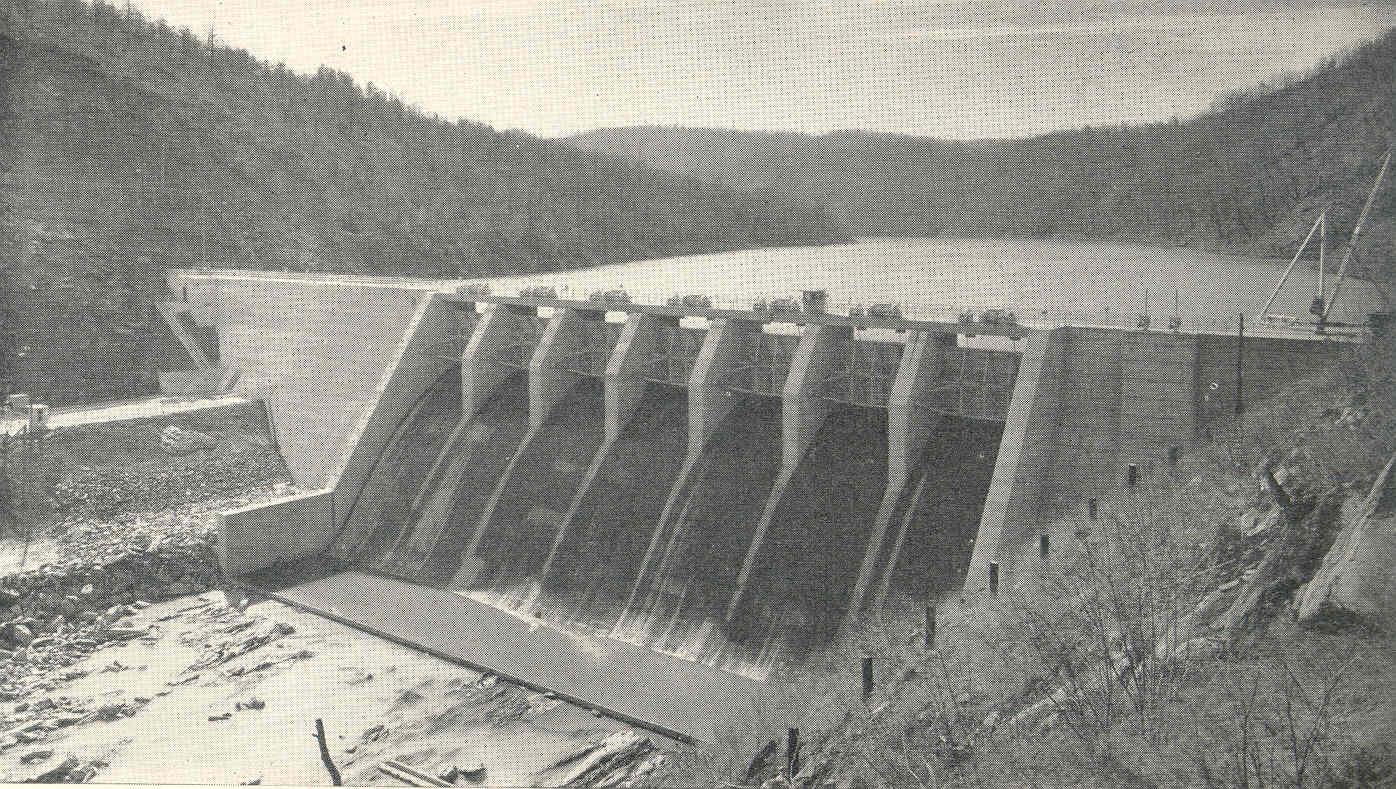
Ocoee Dam No. 3, circa 1945

The TVA Act of 1933 created the Tennessee Valley Authority and gave the Authority oversight of the entire Tennessee River watershed, which includes the Ocoee. In 1939, a U.S. Supreme Court ruling forced TEPCO to sell TVA its assets, which included the tract for Ocoee No. 3. While TVA identified the Ocoee No. 3 site as part of its Hiwassee Valley surveys in 1934, the idea for the dam received little attention until the outbreak of World War II in Europe sparked a need for increased aluminum production at the ALCOA plant in Alcoa, Tennessee, which required large amounts of electricity. The Ocoee No. 3 project, along with several other dam projects in the Hiwassee watershed, was authorized on July 16, 1941. Construction began the following day.

Most of the land necessary for the construction of Ocoee Dam No. 3 and its reservoir had been obtained from TEPCO, and thus no residential or cemetery relocations were necessary. Work progressed at a steady pace, and the dam was completed on August 15, 1942. The diversion tunnel was completed in November of the same year, but budget delays prevented the dam's generator from becoming operational until April 30, 1943.

=== February 2008 sediment analysis ===
On February 11, 2008, a team from Yonsei University tested mud from the bottom of Ocoee Lake No. 3 and found it contained metals like iron, aluminum, manganese, copper, zinc and lead. In a paper published under the title "Metal release from bottom sediments of Ocoee Lake No. 3, a primary catchment area for the Ducktown Mining District ", the researchers discovered that about one-sixth of the mud dissolved quickly in a strong acid solution. When the water above the mud became slightly more acidic—dropping from a pH of 6.4 down to 5.9, such as from light acidic rainfall—a large amount of those metals seep into the water column. At the lowest pH tested by the researchers (2.6), lead levels in the water jumped over two thousand times, copper by 160 times, and zinc by 21 times. The researchers concluded across multiple tests that activities such as stirring up sediment, dredging, removal of the dam, light acid rain, or acid spill has the potential to release these toxic metals into the water in large quantities.

=== January 2009 sludge release ===
On January 4, 2009, TVA released a substantial amount of contaminated sludge-like material from the Ocoee No. 3 Reservoir into the Upper Ocoee immediately downstream, killing an undetermined number of fish and covering the river with a 3.5-foot (1.1 m) layer of "foul-smelling" sludge as far downstream as the Ocoee No. 2 Reservoir. The sludge was filled with contaminants— including copper, iron, and zinc— left over from the mining operations that once denuded the Ducktown Basin, which is adjacent to the Ocoee No. 3 reservoir. The release polluted the Ocoee Whitewater Center, which is two miles (3 km) downstream from Ocoee Dam No. 3.

TVA stated that the release was part of routine maintenance in anticipation of rain showers. The material was released via the dam's sluice gates, which are located at the bottom of the dam and are typically used for low-level and recreational releases. On January 12, 2009, in response to the incident, the Tennessee Department of Environment and Conservation issued a notice of violation that ordered TVA to get state approval before using the dam's sluice gates, restore the affected areas, and submit a management plan for sluicing operations at the dam.
