= Hales Bar Dam =

- Hale's Bar Dam Powerhouse
- U.S. National Register of Historic Places
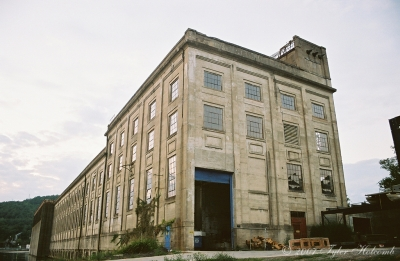
- Hales Bar Dam Powerhouse, now being used as a private event location. It is also open for reservation-only tours.

- Location within Tennessee Location within the United States
- Location: 1265 Hale's Bar Rd., Haletown, Tennessee
- Coordinates: 35°2′48″N 85°32′22″W
- Area: 2 acres (0.81 ha)
- Built: 1905-1913
- Architect: John Bogart
- Architectural style: Classical Revival
- NRHP reference No.: 08001111
- Added to NRHP: November 25, 2008

Hales Bar Dam was a hydroelectric dam once located on the Tennessee River in Marion County, Tennessee, United States. The Chattanooga and Tennessee River Power Company began building the dam on October 17, 1905, and completed it on November 11, 1913, making Hales Bar one of the first major multipurpose dams and one of the first major dams to be built across a navigable channel in the United States. It began operation on November 13, 1913.

On August 15, 1939, the Tennessee Valley Authority, which had been established by the President Franklin D. Roosevelt administration to develop and regulate flood control and hydropower in the Valley, assumed control of Hales Bar Dam after purchasing TEPCO's assets through Eminent Domain. It had conducted a lengthy court battle that went all the way to the US Supreme Court.

The TVA worked for two decades trying to fix a leakage problem that had plagued Hales Bar since its construction. But, after continued leakage and determining that expanding the dam's navigation lock would be too expensive, TVA decided to replace the dam. It built Nickajack Dam 6 miles (9.7 km) downstream. Hales Bar Dam ceased operation on December 14, 1967.

== Location and capacity ==
Hales Bar Dam was located along the Tennessee River at 431 miles (694 km) above the river's mouth, near the southwest end of the Tennessee River Gorge. The dam's reservoir extended up the river through the gorge all the way to Chattanooga, and had 162 miles (261 km) of shoreline. Before the construction of Hales Bar, this was a particularly unpredictable and dangerous section of the river, with numerous navigation obstacles. Downstream from the dam site, the river begins to steady as it enters the hills and flatlands near Guntersville.

Hales Bar Dam was 113 feet (34 m) high and 2,315 feet (706 m) long, and its spillway had a combined discharge capacity of 224,000 cubic feet per second (6,300 m^{3}/s). After improvements by TVA in 1949, the dam had a generating capacity of 99,700 kilowatts. The dam's lock, which went into operation on November 1, 1913, was 60 feet (18 m) by 260 feet (79 m), and its 41-foot (12 m) lift was the highest in the world at that time.

== Construction ==
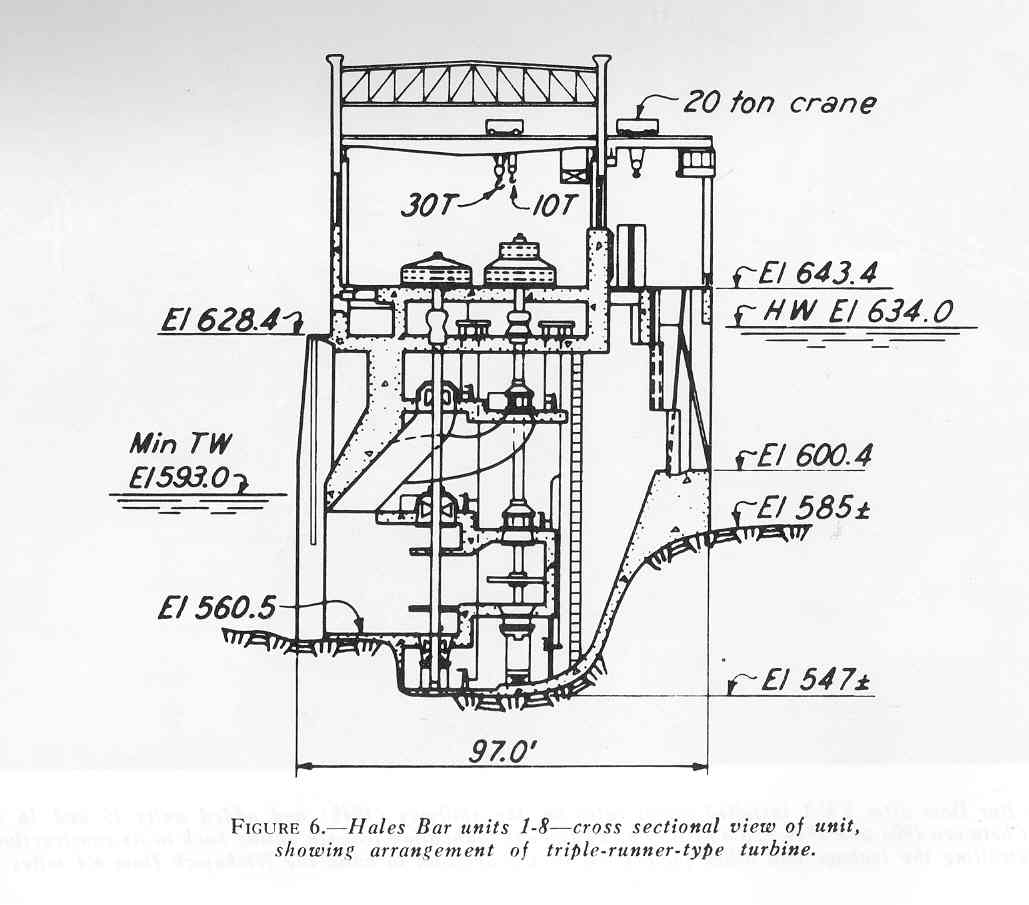
Cross-section of the original turbines used at Hales Bar Dam

Along with Muscle Shoals and the Elk River Shoals further downstream, the Tennessee River Gorge had long been one of the major impediments to river navigation in the upper Tennessee Valley. While various 19th-century canal projects had minor success in extending navigation across the shoals, the Tennessee River Gorge remained largely untamed.

In 1898, several Chattanooga business interests formed the Tennessee River Improvement Association to lobby for efforts to extend year-round navigation to Chattanooga, and around 1900, Major Dan C. Kingman of the U.S. Army Corps of Engineers drafted a design for a dam that would flood the Tennessee River Gorge and remove the swift current and various hazards that had long prevented large-scale navigation through this stretch of the river. In 1904, Kingman's friend, Josephus Conn Guild, offered to build the dam with private funding in exchange for the rights to the dam's hydroelectric power. Congress passed the enabling legislation on April 27, 1904, and with funding from Chattanooga entrepreneur Charles E. James and New York financier Anthony Brady, Guild formed the Chattanooga and Tennessee River Power Company to oversee the project. The project was estimated to cost US$3,000,000 (equivalent to $81.7 million in 2024) but by the time the project was finished, it cost US$10,000,000 (equivalent to $233 million in 2024).

The dam's initial contractor, William J. Oliver and Company, began work on the dam in October 1905. Two self-contained communities, Guild (now Haletown) and Ladds, were built to house the thousands of construction workers needed to build the dam. The dam was originally slated for completion in 1909, but numerous difficulties, primarily related to the soft bedrock upon which the dam was built, continuously stalled construction. By 1910, only the lock and powerhouse had been completed. Engineers began to make progress after employing the use of pressure grouting and concrete caissons— the first use of either in a major dam construction project— and Hales Bar Dam was finished on November 11, 1913.

Leaks began to appear almost immediately after completion, however. In 1919, engineers attempted to minimize the leakage by pumping hot asphalt into the dam's foundation. This was temporarily successful, but by 1931, a study showed the dam was leaking at a rate of 1,000 cubic feet per second (28 m^{3}/s).

== TVA operations ==
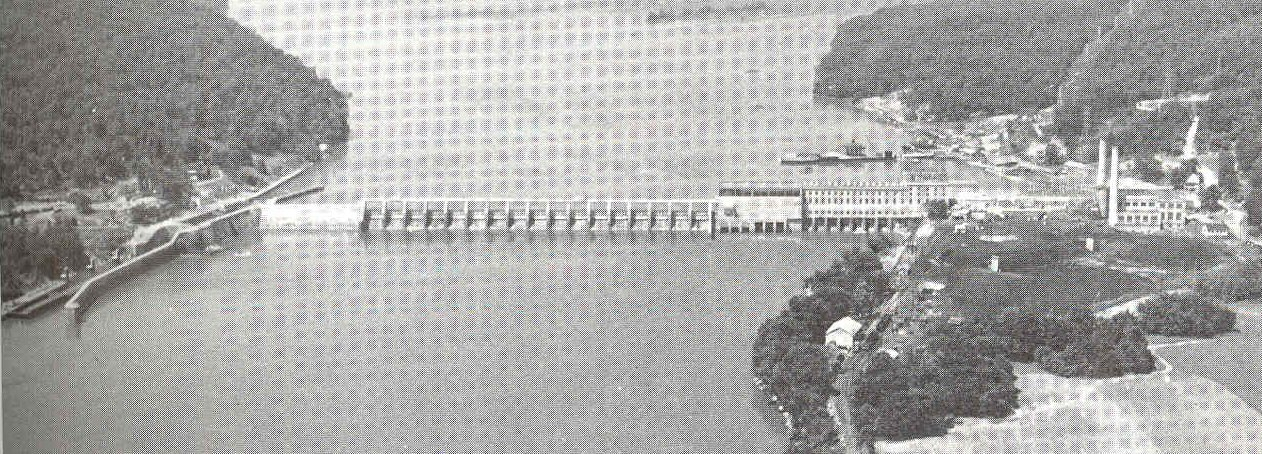
Hales Bar Dam in 1949, after various improvements

The passage of the TVA Act in 1933 created the Tennessee Valley Authority and gave it control of flood control and improvement initiatives in the Tennessee Valley. By this time, Chattanooga and Tennessee River Power had merged with several other companies to form the Tennessee Electric Power Company, or TEPCO. The new company was eventually headed by Guild's son, Jo Conn Guild, who was a fierce opponent of TVA. With the help of attorney Wendell Willkie, TEPCO challenged the constitutionality of the TVA Act in federal court. In 1939, however, the U.S. Supreme Court ruled in Tennessee Electric Power Company v. TVA, upholding the TVA Act. A few months later, TEPCO was forced to sell most of its assets, including Hales Bar Dam, to TVA for $78 million (equivalent to $1.38 billion in 2024).

After gaining control of Hales Bar Dam in 1939, TVA carried out extensive repair work on the dam's foundation; by 1943 this had succeeded in halting the dam's leakage. In 1949, TVA increased the dam's generating capacity and equipped the spillway with radial gates that helped extend the Hales Bar Reservoir's navigation channel to the base of Chickamauga Dam. In the late 1950s, however, boils began to appear in the water below Hales Bar Dam, and an investigation showed the dam was again leaking, this time at an alarming 2,000 cubic feet per second (57 m^{3}/s). Dye tests carried out in 1960 suggested that many of the leakage channels had interconnected, increasing the possibility of a future dam failure.

In the 1960s, TVA began expanding the size of its dam locks to accommodate the increase in river traffic in the Tennessee Valley since the end of World War II. A study in 1963 suggested that expanding the size of the Hales Bar lock would be extremely expensive and, considering the continued expenses involved with leak repair, TVA decided to replace the dam altogether. Nickajack Dam was authorized in January 1963 and construction was completed December 14, 1967. Operations were halted at Hales Bar Dam the following day, and by September 1968, Hales Bar Dam had been dismantled so that it did not threaten navigation on the new Nickajack Lake. Two of Hales Bar's generators and parts of Hales Bar's switchyard were installed at Nickajack.

== Later operations ==
The Hales Bar Dam Powerhouse was listed on the National Register of Historic Places in 2008. Since the dam was closed, it has been operated as a private event space. In addition, tours can be arranged by reservation. A marina has been developed adjacent to this site. The building is currently being used as the home of Dam Whiskey and Moonshine Distillery
