= Noontootla Creek =

River in the United States of America

Coordinates: 34.7114°N 84.2298°W

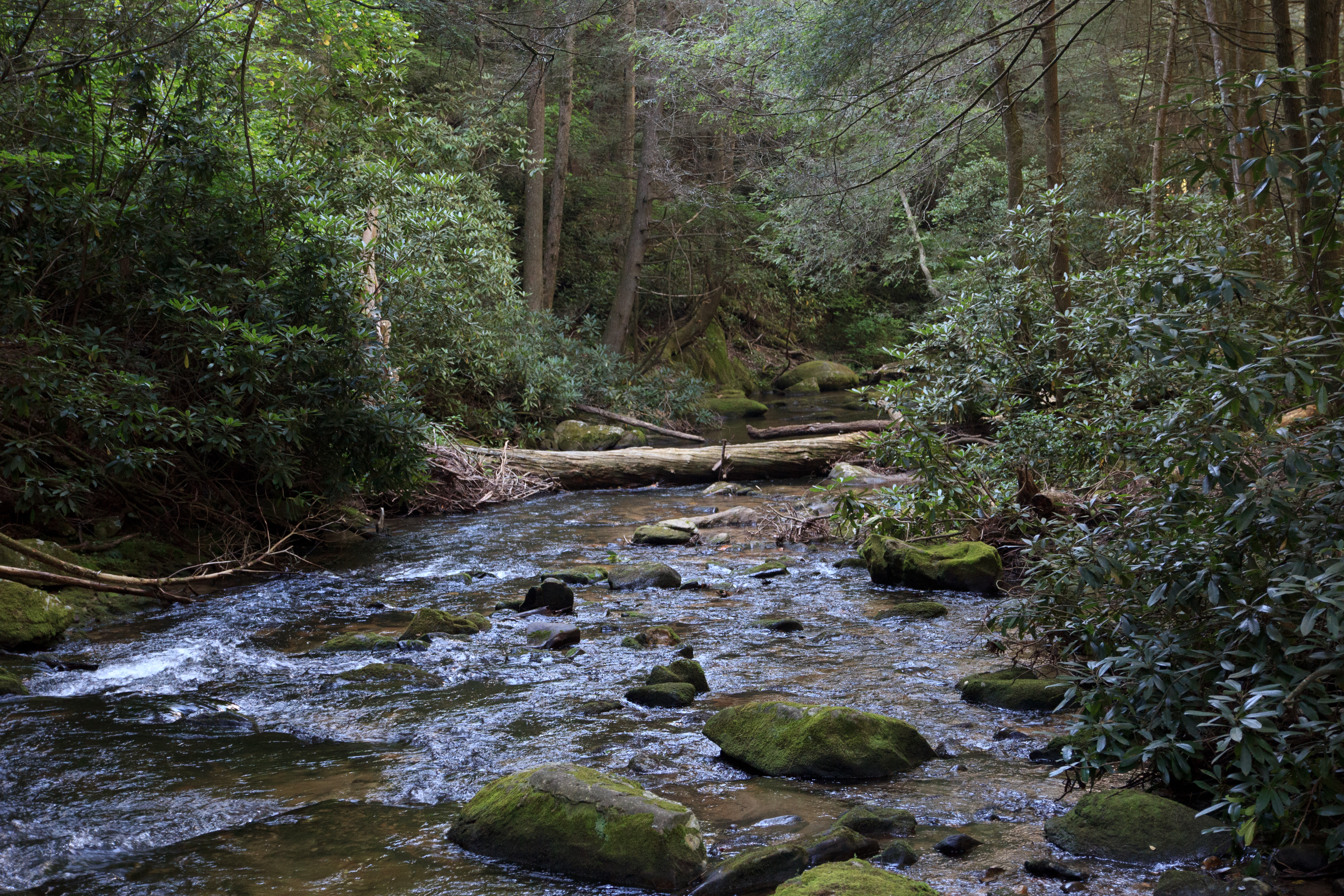
Noontootla Creek in Fannin County, Georgia

Noontootla Creek is a small mountain stream situated in the Chattahoochee–Oconee National Forest in north Georgia. The creek has a healthy population of trout and is managed to imitate a natural stream.

Noontootla Creek begins close to Springer Mountain at an elevation of 3045 feet above sea level. From there it flows northwest for approximately eleven miles where it joins the Toccoa River.

Noontootla is a name derived from the Cherokee language meaning either "land of the shining water" or "middle sun".
