= Stanley Creek (Toccoa River tributary) =

Stream in Georgia, U.S.

Coordinates: 34°47′0.31″N 84°15′51.70″W

Stanley Creek is a stream in the U.S. state of Georgia. It is a tributary to the Toccoa River.

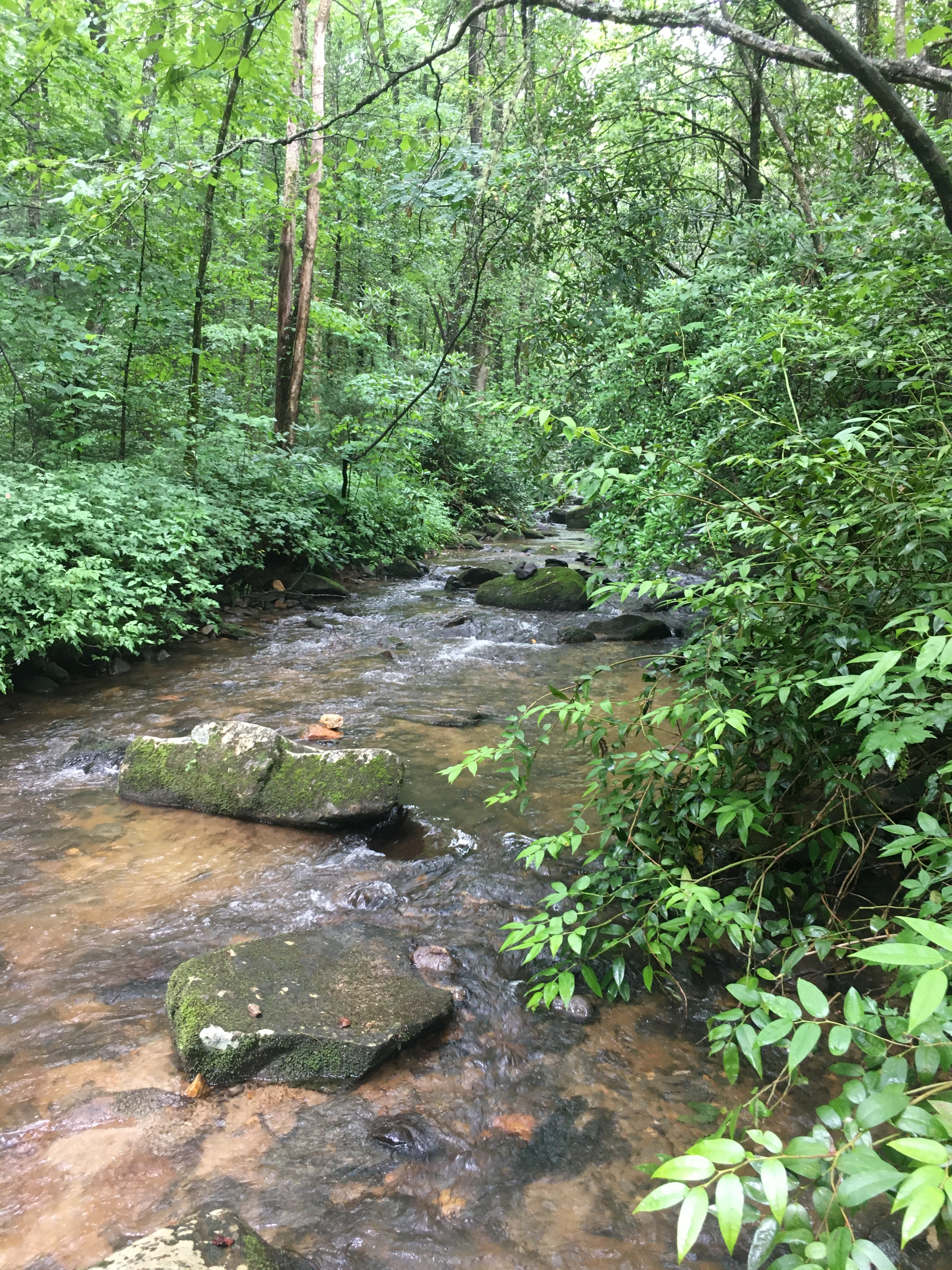
Stanley Creek

Stanley Creek was named after John Stanley, a pioneer citizen.
