= Lake Blue Ridge =

Blue Ridge Lake
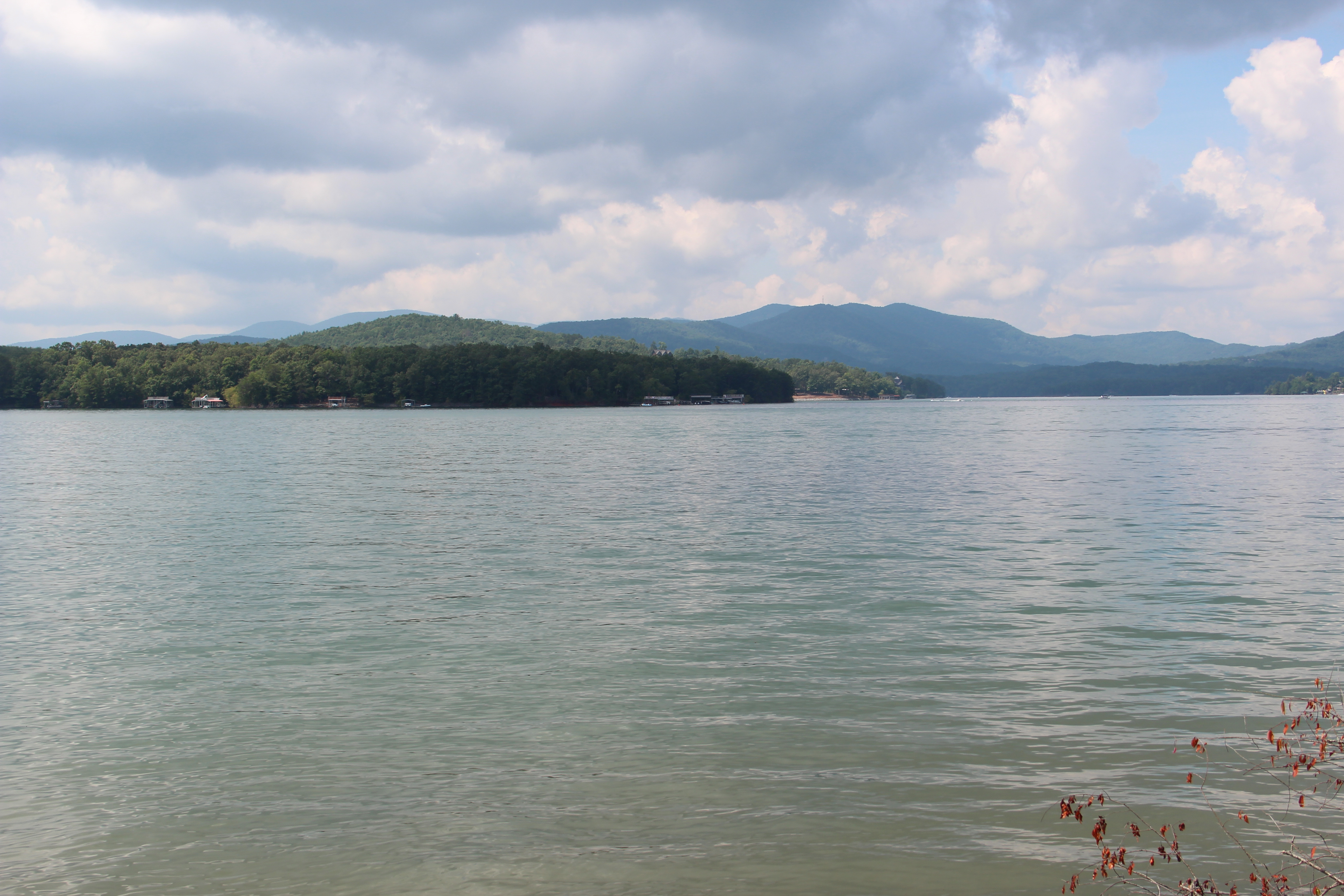
- Blue Ridge Lake viewed from Morganton Point with the Rich Mountains in the background

- Location within Georgia Location within the United States
- Location: Fannin County, Georgia
- Coordinates: 34°52′57″N 84°16′48″W
- Type: reservoir, from 1931
- Primary inflows: Toccoa River
- Primary outflows: Toccoa River
- Basin countries: United States
- Surface area: 3,300 acres (1,300 ha)
- Average depth: 100 ft (30 m)
- Max. depth: 246 ft (75 m)
- Water volume: 68,500 acre⋅ft (84,500 dam^{3}) maximum
- Shore length^{1}: 65 mi (105 km)
- Surface elevation: 1,686 ft (514 m)
- ^{1} Shore length is not a well-defined measure.

Blue Ridge Lake is a reservoir in Fannin County, in the northern portion of the U.S. state of Georgia. The reservoir encompasses 3,300-acre (1,300 ha) of water, and a "full summer pool" of approximately 1,686 feet (514 m) above mean sea level. It is managed by the Tennessee Valley Authority and is primarily fed by the Toccoa River.

Blue Ridge Lake was created by the completion of Blue Ridge Dam and has approximately 60 miles (97 km) of shoreline and a flood storage capacity of 68,500 acre⋅ft (84,500 dam^{3}). The lake's levels fluctuate by about 20 feet (6.1 m) in a typical year. Blue Ridge Dam was completed in 1930. It stands 175 feet (53 m) high and is 1,553 feet (473 m) wide across the Toccoa river. The dam provides up to 13 megawatts of power via a single generator.

== Drawdown 2010 ==
As part of the Blue Ridge Dam Rehabilitation project, the Tennessee Valley Authority began slowly lowering the elevation of Blue Ridge Lake in July 2010. This rehabilitation project aimed to repair the dam penstock and to stabilize both the upstream and downstream faces of the dam. The project reduced the water level in the lake to approximately 1,630 feet (500 m) above sea level around the middle of October 2010 and the portion of work requiring the drawdown was completed in April 2011 when refilling of the lake began. However, TVA decided to hold the lake level at 1,672 feet (510 m) through the summer of 2012 due to unexpected ground movement experienced in March 2012.
