= Ocoee Scenic Byway =

Scenic highway in Tennessee

Ocoee Scenic Byway National Forest Scenic Byway

Route information
- Maintained by TDOT
- Length: 26 mi (42 km)
- Existed: July 22, 1988–present
- Component highways: US 64 / US 74 (Entire length)

Location
- Country: United States
- State: Tennessee
- Counties: Polk

Highway system
- Scenic Byways; National; National Forest; BLM; NPS; Tennessee State Routes; Interstate; US; State

The Ocoee Scenic Byway is a 26-mile (42 km) National Forest Scenic Byway and Tennessee Scenic Byway that traverses through the Cherokee National Forest in East Tennessee. It is part of both U.S. Route 64 and U.S. Route 74 and features the Ocoee Whitewater Center and scenic bluffs along Ocoee River and Gorge. It is also part of Corridor K of the Appalachian Development Highway System.

== Route ==
The scenic byway traverses along 19 miles (31 km) of US 64/US 74, as it routes along the north banks of the Ocoee River. At Oswald Road (Forest Road 77), the 7-mile (11 km) Chilhowee Scenic Spur climbs to the top of the Chilhowee Mountains. Various boating/fishing activities can be done at Parksville Lake; while canoeing, rafting and kayaking can be done at the Ocoee Whitewater Center, venue of the 1996 Olympic Canoe/Kayak Slalom Competition when the Summer Olympics were held in Atlanta. The majority of the route is two lanes, but a short segment west of the whitewater center is four lanes. Part of the four-lane section was narrowed to two lanes before the Olympics to make room for stands, and the original eastbound lanes of that section are now used as parking for the Whitewater Center. The two-lane sections are some of the only sections of US 64 in Tennessee that are still two lanes.

== History ==
The route follows the Old Copper Road, originally a wagon trail dating back to the 1850s for transporting copper from the Copper Basin area to Cleveland and Chattanooga. The Ocoee Scenic Byway was the first National Forest Scenic Byway in the nation, designated on July 22, 1988, by the United States Forest Service. The route is prone to rockslides. The worst rockslide in the route's history occurred on November 10, 2009, near Ocoee Dam No. 2, blocking the route for months.

Due to the increasing rate of commercial traffic, the Tennessee Department of Transportation plans to replace the route with a four-lane highway. Multiple methods are being considered, including a route on the south side over the river and existing route, a route over nearby Little Frog Mountain, and a tunnel.

== Junctions ==
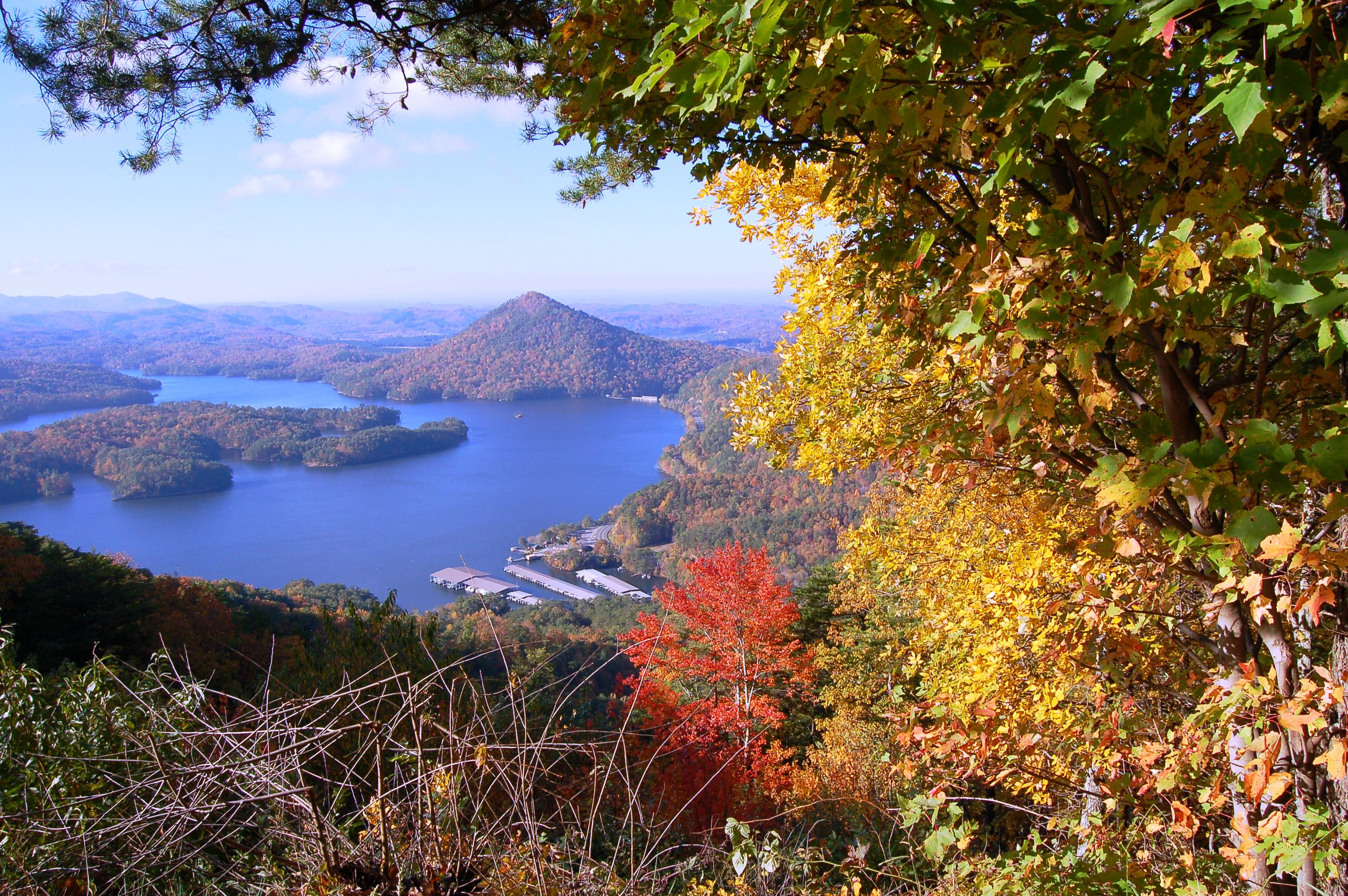
Ocoee Scenic Byway

The entire route is in Polk County.

Location	mi	km	Destinations	Notes
	0.0	0.0	SR 314 north (Parksville Road) – Benton	Continuation as US 64/US 74; southern terminal of SR 314
	3.0	4.8	Oswald Road (Forest Road 77)	7-mile (11 km) Chilhowee scenic spur
	5.1	8.2	SR 30 west – Reliance	Eastern terminus of SR 30
	13.8	22.2	Little Gassaway Road (Forest Road 45)	To Ocoee Dam No. 3
	19.0	30.6	Carrianne Hills Road	Continuation as US 64/US 74
1.000 mi = 1.609 km; 1.000 km = 0.621 mi

== See also ==
- Cherohala Skyway
- Foothills Parkway
- Natchez Trace Parkway
