= Lookout Mountain Incline Railway =

- U.S. National Register of Historic Places
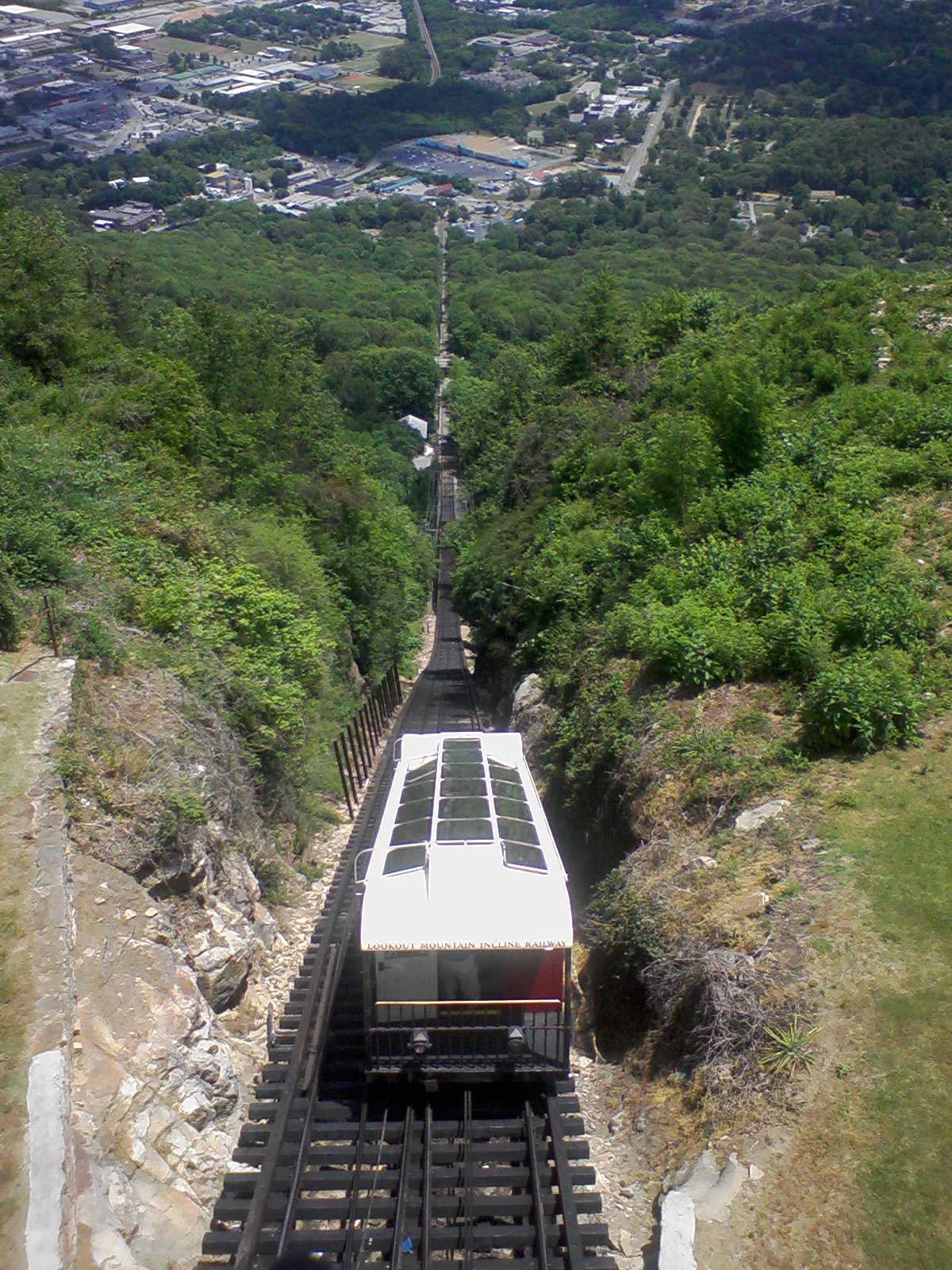
- A view down the 1-mile (1.6 km) length of the railway from the top of Lookout Mountain

- Location within Tennessee Location within the United States
- Location: 3917 St. Elmo Avenue, Chattanooga, Tennessee 37409
- Coordinates: 35°0′28″N 85°20′8″W
- Built: November 16, 1895 (130 years ago)
- Architect: Josephus "Jo" Conn Guild Sr.
- NRHP reference No.: 73001774
- Added to NRHP: April 26, 1973

The Lookout Mountain Incline Railway is a 4 ft 8 1/2 in (1,435 mm) standard gauge inclined plane funicular railway leading to the top of Lookout Mountain from the historic St. Elmo neighborhood of Chattanooga, Tennessee. Passengers are transported from St. Elmo's Station at the base, to Point Park at the mountain summit, which overlooks the city and the Tennessee River. It is just a short drive to three of Chattanooga's main tourist attractions, Ruby Falls, Cavern Castle, and Rock City. It obtained Historic Mechanical Engineering Landmark status in 1991.

The railway is approximately one mile (1.6 km) in length (single-track except for a short two-track passing loop at the midway point, allowing operation of two cars at one time). It has a maximum grade of 72.7%, making it one of the world's steepest passenger railways.

The Incline Railway is a well-known Chattanooga landmark; the railway has been depicted in numerous regional and national publications, including being on TV, most prominently on Larry the Cable Guy's Only in America with Larry the Cable Guy in February 2011. The railway is one of the main tourist attractions in the Chattanooga area, totaling over 100,000 visits annually. The top station features an observation deck and a gift shop.

== History ==
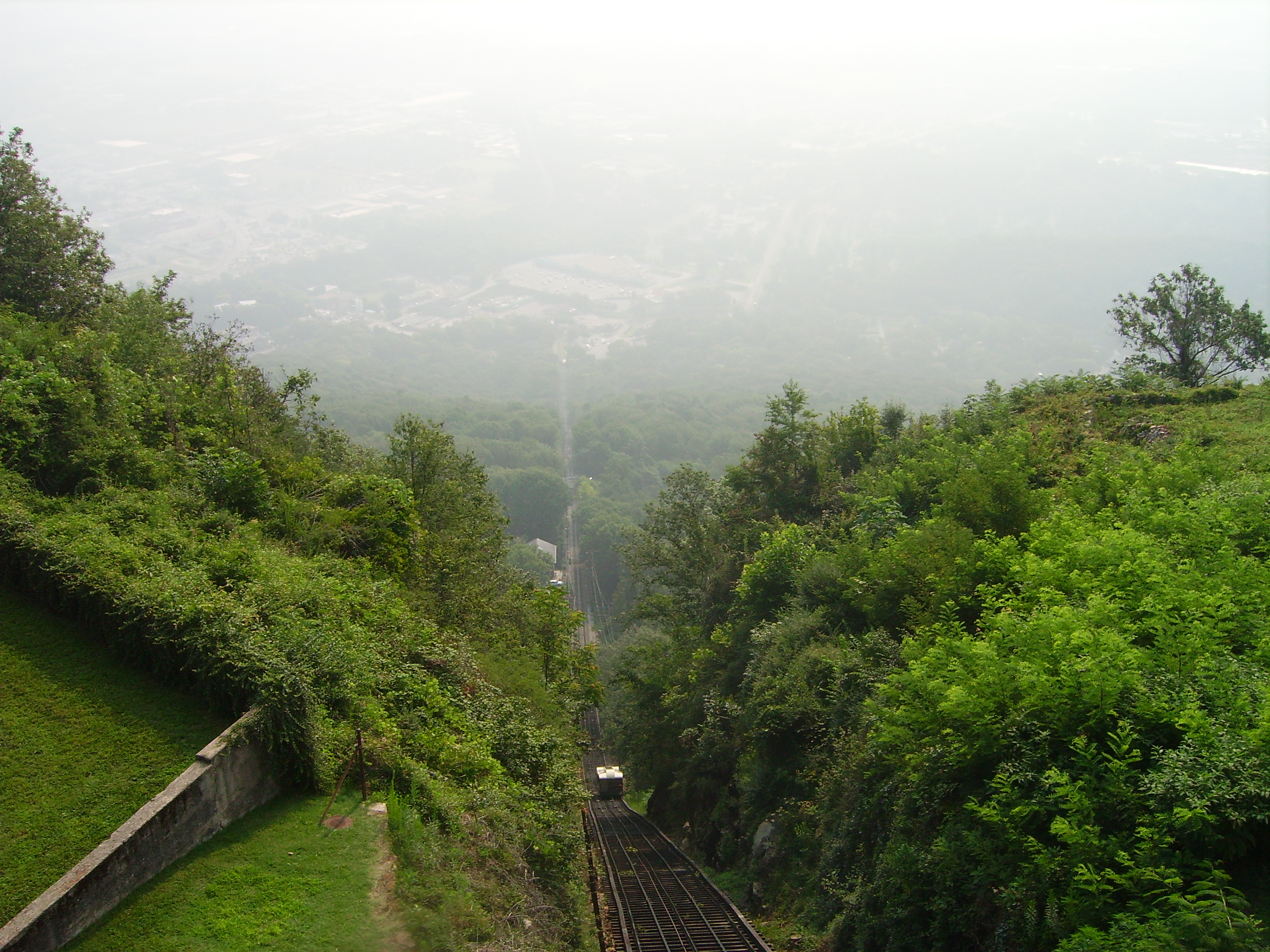
A foggy day on the railway. Chattanooga is barely visible in the background.

The Lookout Mountain Incline Railway (Incline No. 2) was opened on November 16, 1895, by the Chattanooga Incline and Lula Lake Railway and functions as a major mode of transportation to the top of the mountain. It was the second of two inclines constructed on Lookout Mountain; the first was the Chattanooga and Lookout Mountain Railway (Incline No. 1), which operated from 1886 to 1895 and dismantled in 1900. The cable system for the cars was made by the Otis Elevator Company.

=== Early powerhouse fires ===
Service was disrupted twice by fires that destroyed the powerhouse, upper station and cars stored there overnight (the first fire occurring on December 13, 1896, and the second on March 24, 1919). Both fires put the railway temporarily out of service, substitute service being provided by the Chattanooga Railway and Light Company's Lookout Mountain route.

=== Sale to transport authority ===
The railway was sold in the 1940s to Southern Coach Lines and is now operated by the Chattanooga Area Regional Transportation Authority, the area's public transit agency.

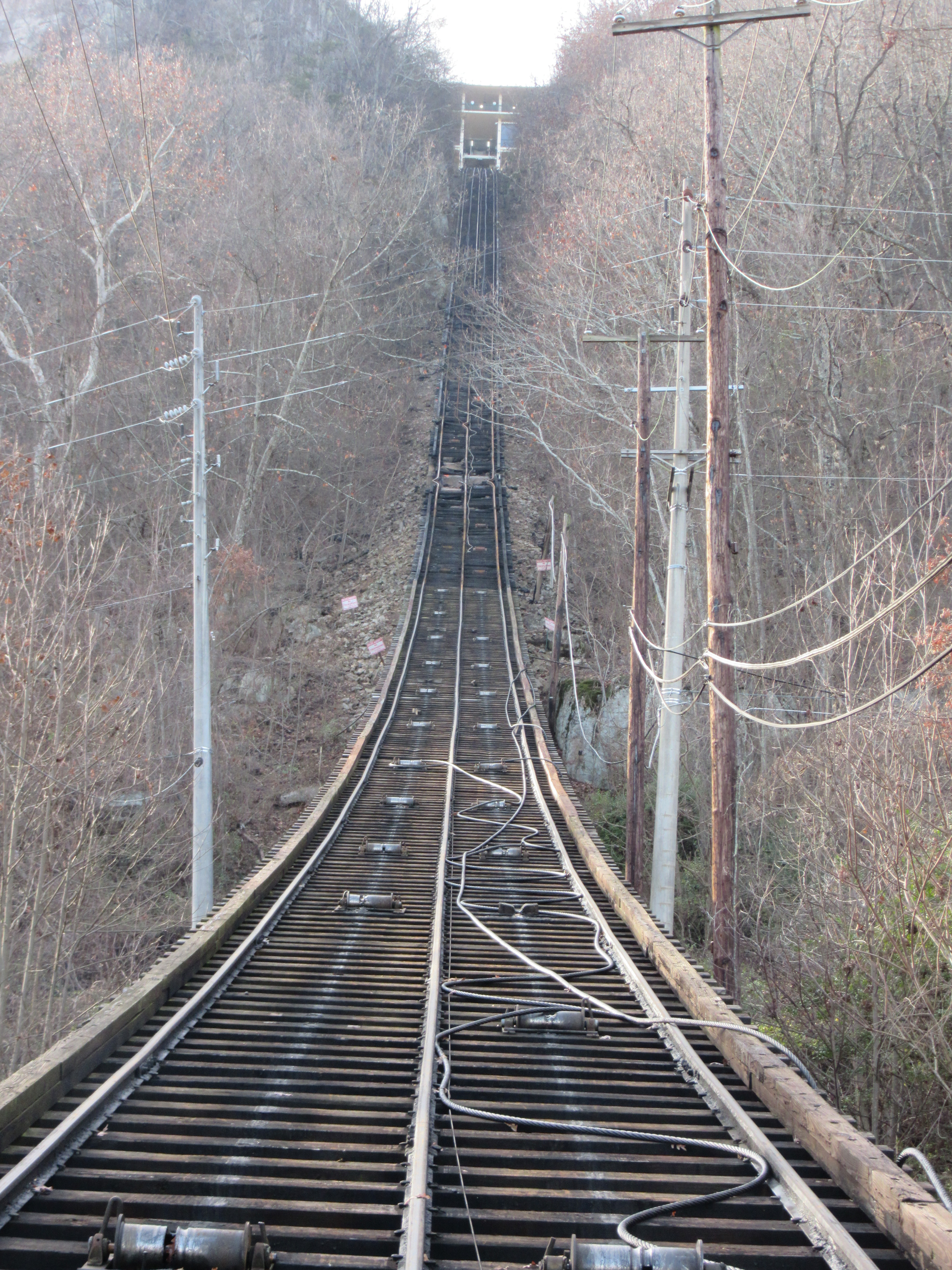
Fire-damaged Lookout Mountain Incline Railway, after the December 7, 2024, wildfire (facing uphill (west) from just below Guild Trail).

=== 2024 rockslide and wildfire ===
On December 7, 2024, a rockslide from the east face of Lookout Mountain (just south of the incline) caused a wildfire, temporarily suspending all funicular traffic. The rail system, cables, and cross timbers were damaged by the fire, leaving the railway out of service for months. The railway reopened on July 14, 2025.

== See also ==
- List of funicular railways
- Otis Elevating Railway
