= Ocoee Dam No. 1 =

Hydroelectric dam in Tennessee

- Ocoee No. 1 Hydroelectric Station
- U.S. National Register of Historic Places
- U.S. Historic district
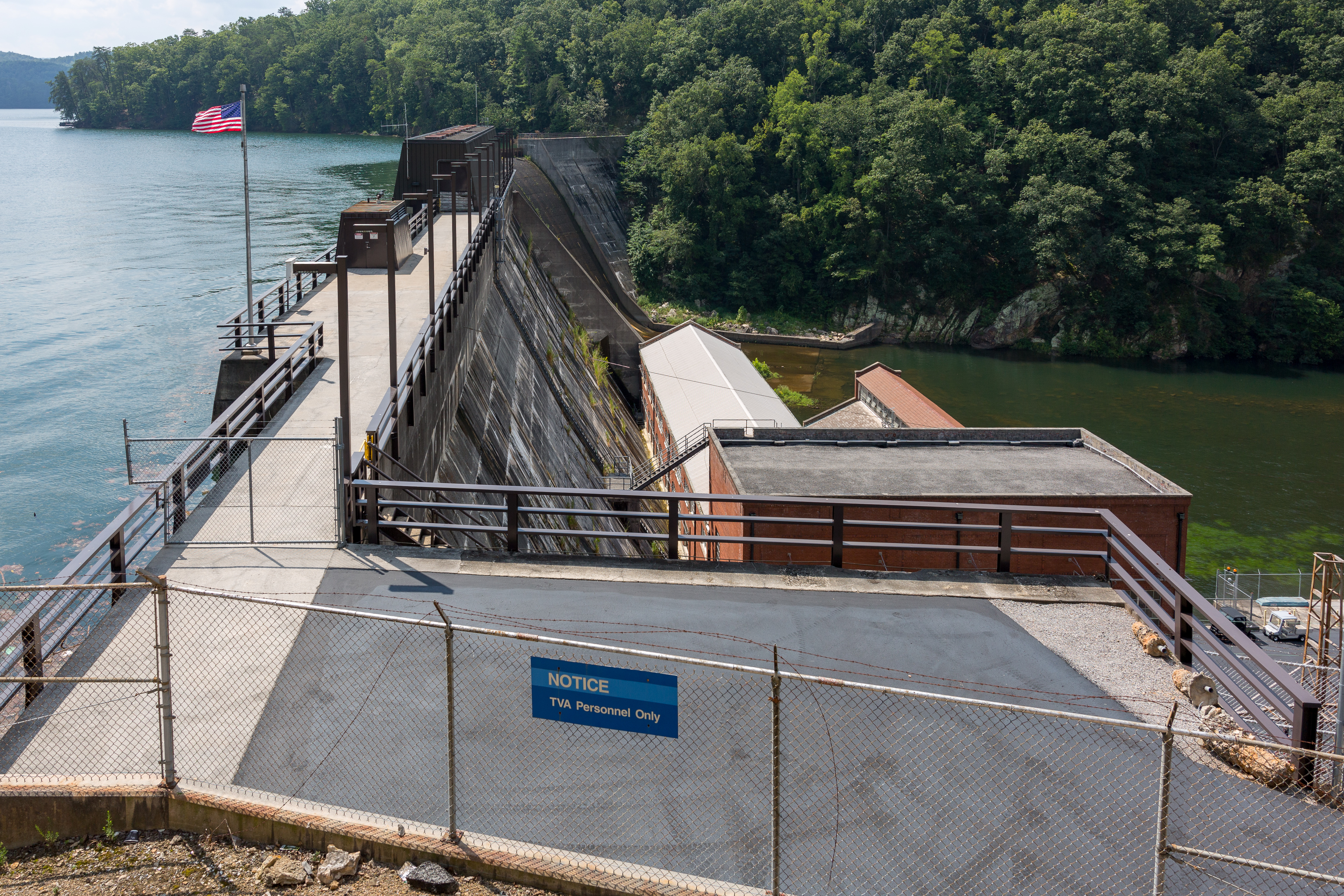
- Ocoee Dam with the TVA Ocoee Hypro Plant

- Location within Tennessee Location within the United States
- Location: Polk County, Tennessee
- Coordinates: 35°5′41″N 84°38′52″W
- Built: 1910-1911
- Architect: J.G. White, W.P. Creager
- NRHP reference No.: 90001003
- Added to NRHP: 1990

Ocoee Dam Number 1 is a hydroelectric dam on the Ocoee River in Polk County in the U.S. state of Tennessee. The dam impounds the 1,930-acre (780 ha) Parksville Reservoir (often called Ocoee Lake or Parksville Lake) and is the farthest downstream of four dams on the Toccoa/Ocoee River owned and operated by the Tennessee Valley Authority. Completed in 1911, Ocoee No. 1 was one of the first hydroelectric projects in Tennessee.

== Location ==
Ocoee No. 1 is located approximately 12 miles (19 km) upstream from the mouth of the Ocoee, in an area where the river emerges from its winding trek through the Appalachian Mountains and enters the Tennessee Valley. The community of Parksville is located on the north side of the dam, and Chattanooga is roughly 30 miles (48 km) to the west. The Ocoee Scenic Byway—part of U.S. Route 64—passes just north of the dam. Parksville Lake extends for several miles eastward up the Ocoee and several miles southward up Baker Creek, which once emptied into the Ocoee just upstream from the dam. Ocoee Dam No. 2 is located just over 12 miles (19 km) upstream from Ocoee No. 1.

== Capacity ==
The dam is 135 feet (41 m) high and 840 feet (260 m) long and has a generating capacity of 24,000 kilowatts, up from an original 19,200 kilowatts after being refurbished in 1989-91. The concrete gravity arched spillway has a maximum discharge of 45,000 cubic feet per second (1,300 m^{3}/s). Parksville Lake has 109 miles (175 km) of shoreline, and the lake's water levels fluctuate by about 9 feet (2.7 m) per year.

== History ==
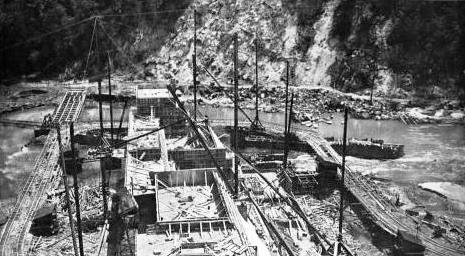
Ocoee Dam No. 1 under construction in 1911

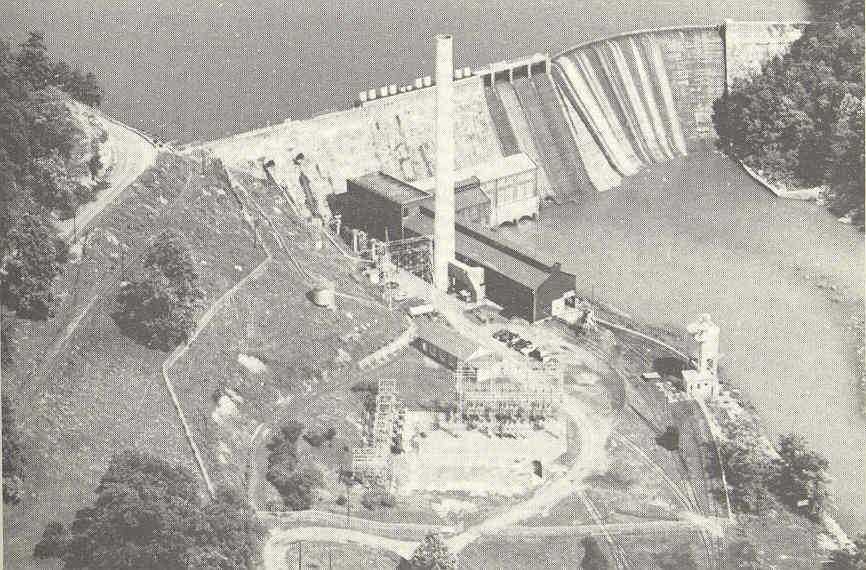
Ocoee Dam No. 1, 1940s

The rapid growth of industry in Chattanooga in the late 19th century and early 20th century brought an increasing demand for electricity, and the rapid-flowing Ocoee River—which passes through a gorge in the mountains 30 miles (48 km) east of the city—was considered a prime candidate for hydroelectric power by the region's early electric companies. In 1910, the C.M. Clark Company, an electrical transportation holding firm, formed the Eastern Tennessee Power Company to build two hydroelectric dams on the Ocoee and market their electricity output primarily to Chattanooga. Work on Ocoee Dam No. 1 began later that year and was completed in late December 1911. On January 27, 1912, the dam's four units began commercial operation. A fifth unit was added in 1914. The five units provided a total capacity of 18 MW. Power was distributed primarily to Chattanooga and also to Knoxville, Nashville, and Rome, Georgia, as well as the aluminum industries in Alcoa. A coal burning station known as the Parksville Steam Plant was built adjacent to the dam in 1916 to provide generation during periods of low water flow. It was last used in 1954.

In 1922, the Eastern Tennessee Power Company and several other entities merged to form the Tennessee Electric Power Company (TEPCO), which overhauled the dam in the 1930s. In 1933, the TVA Act created the Tennessee Valley Authority and gave the Authority oversight of the Tennessee River watershed, which includes the Ocoee River. The head of TEPCO, Jo Conn Guild, was vehemently opposed to the creation of TVA, and with the help of attorney Wendell Willkie challenged the constitutionality of the TVA Act in federal court. The U.S. Supreme Court upheld the TVA Act, however, in its 1939 decision Tennessee Electric Power Company v. TVA. On August 16, 1939, TEPCO was forced to sell its assets to TVA for $78 million (equivalent to $1.38 billion in 2024), which included $2.68 million (equivalent to $47.3 million in 2024) for Ocoee Dam No. 1.
