= Lookout Mountain, Tennessee =

- Town
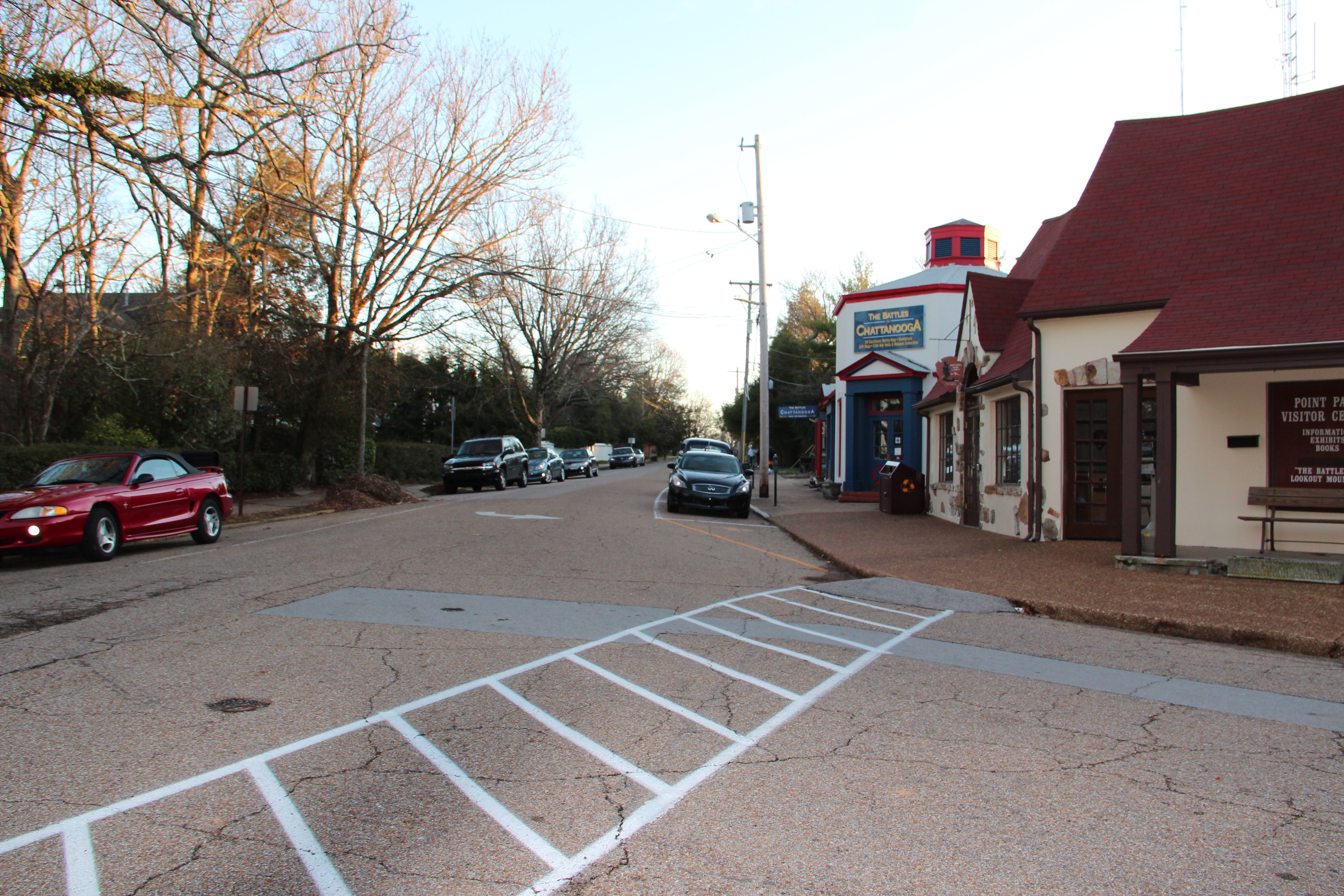
- View of the town outside of Point Park

- Location of Lookout Mountain in Hamilton County, Tennessee.
- Coordinates: 34°59′47″N 85°21′3″W
- Country: United States
- State: Tennessee
- County: Hamilton

Area
  - Total: 1.34 sq mi (3.48 km^{2})
  - Land: 1.34 sq mi (3.48 km^{2})
  - Water: 0 sq mi (0.00 km^{2})
- Elevation: 1,850 ft (560 m)

Population (2020)
  - Total: 2,058
  - Density: 1,532.4/sq mi (591.66/km^{2})
- Time zone: UTC-5 (Eastern (EST))
  - Summer (DST): UTC-4 (EDT)
- ZIP code: 37350
- Area code: 423
- FIPS code: 47-43640
- GNIS feature ID: 1292035
- Website: https://www.lookoutmtn.us/

Lookout Mountain is a town in Hamilton County, Tennessee, United States. The population was 2,058 at the 2020 census. Bordering its sister city of Lookout Mountain, Georgia to the south, Lookout Mountain is part of the Chattanooga, TN–GA Metropolitan Statistical Area.

== Geography ==
Lookout Mountain is located at 34°59′47″N 85°21′3″W (34.996442, -85.350810). According to the United States Census Bureau, the town has a total area of 1.3 square miles (3.3 km^{2}), all of it land.

=== Climate ===
Climate data for Lookout Mountain, Tennessee (Point Park) (1991–2020 normals, extremes 1995–present)
Month	Jan	Feb	Mar	Apr	May	Jun	Jul	Aug	Sep	Oct	Nov	Dec	Year
Record high °F (°C)	71 (22)	76 (24)	82 (28)	84 (29)	87 (31)	100 (38)	99 (37)	98 (37)	93 (34)	93 (34)	81 (27)	73 (23)	100 (38)
Mean maximum °F (°C)	62.8 (17.1)	67.7 (19.8)	75.9 (24.4)	80.7 (27.1)	84.6 (29.2)	89.7 (32.1)	90.5 (32.5)	90.9 (32.7)	87.1 (30.6)	81.4 (27.4)	70.7 (21.5)	63.8 (17.7)	92.8 (33.8)
Mean daily maximum °F (°C)	45.6 (7.6)	49.4 (9.7)	58.3 (14.6)	67.7 (19.8)	74.2 (23.4)	80.5 (26.9)	83.8 (28.8)	82.4 (28.0)	77.6 (25.3)	67.4 (19.7)	56.8 (13.8)	48.5 (9.2)	66.0 (18.9)
Daily mean °F (°C)	37.2 (2.9)	40.4 (4.7)	48.4 (9.1)	57.6 (14.2)	65.5 (18.6)	72.6 (22.6)	75.6 (24.2)	74.5 (23.6)	69.5 (20.8)	59.0 (15.0)	48.3 (9.1)	40.5 (4.7)	57.4 (14.1)
Mean daily minimum °F (°C)	28.7 (−1.8)	31.4 (−0.3)	38.6 (3.7)	47.4 (8.6)	56.8 (13.8)	64.7 (18.2)	67.4 (19.7)	66.6 (19.2)	61.3 (16.3)	50.6 (10.3)	39.8 (4.3)	32.4 (0.2)	48.8 (9.3)
Mean minimum °F (°C)	9.8 (−12.3)	15.2 (−9.3)	23.7 (−4.6)	34.3 (1.3)	43.8 (6.6)	57.5 (14.2)	62.0 (16.7)	61.2 (16.2)	51.0 (10.6)	36.0 (2.2)	25.0 (−3.9)	18.9 (−7.3)	7.9 (−13.4)
Record low °F (°C)	−2 (−19)	−5 (−21)	6 (−14)	26 (−3)	38 (3)	48 (9)	57 (14)	53 (12)	44 (7)	28 (−2)	15 (−9)	−6 (−21)	−6 (−21)
Average precipitation inches (mm)	5.53 (140)	5.99 (152)	5.59 (142)	5.52 (140)	4.31 (109)	4.21 (107)	4.78 (121)	3.98 (101)	4.92 (125)	3.78 (96)	4.62 (117)	5.37 (136)	58.60 (1,488)
Average precipitation days (≥ 0.01 in)	11.8	11.2	11.1	10.6	11.0	10.9	11.2	10.0	8.2	8.1	9.2	10.9	124.2
Source: NOAA (mean maxima/minima 2006–2020)

== Demographics ==
Historical population
Census	Pop.	Note	%±
1900	452		—
1910	631		39.6%
1920	623		−1.3%
1930	1,031		65.5%
1940	1,545		49.9%
1950	1,675		8.4%
1960	1,817		8.5%
1970	1,741		−4.2%
1980	1,886		8.3%
1990	1,901		0.8%
2000	2,000		5.2%
2010	1,832		−8.4%
2020	2,058		12.3%

=== 2020 census ===
Lookout Mountain racial composition
Race	Number	Percentage
White (non-Hispanic)	1,945	94.51%
Black or African American (non-Hispanic)	13	0.63%
Asian	19	0.92%
Other/Mixed	54	2.62%
Hispanic or Latino	27	1.31%

As of the 2020 United States census, there were 2,058 people, 737 households, and 557 families residing in the town.

=== 2000 census ===
As of the census of 2000, there were 2,000 people, 791 households, and 586 families residing in the town. The population density was 1,587.6 inhabitants per square mile (613.0/km^{2}). There were 836 housing units at an average density of 663.6 per square mile (256.2/km^{2}). The racial makeup of the town was 96.90% White, 2.10% African American, 0.05% Native American, 0.50% Asian, 0.10% Pacific Islander, 0.05% from other races, and 0.30% from two or more races. Hispanic or Latino of any race were 0.40% of the population.

There were 791 households, out of which 35.3% had children under the age of 18 living with them, 66.9% were married couples living together, 6.3% had a female householder with no husband present, and 25.9% were non-families. 24.5% of all households were made up of individuals, and 13.3% had someone living alone who was 65 years of age or older. The average household size was 2.53 and the average family size was 3.03.

In the town, the population was spread out, with 28.1% under the age of 18, 4.3% from 18 to 24, 21.1% from 25 to 44, 27.6% from 45 to 64, and 19.0% who were 65 years of age or older. The median age was 43 years. For every 100 females, there were 90.8 males. For every 100 females age 18 and over, there were 85.8 males.

The median income for a household in the town was $100,782, and the median income for a family was $121,037. Males had a median income of $94,501 versus $37,917 for females. The per capita income for the town was $60,938, the third highest in the state. About 4.3% of families and 4.2% of the population were below the poverty line, including 1.6% of those under age 18 and 2.1% of those age 65 or over.

== Points of interest ==
- Lookout Mountain Incline Railway
- Point Park and Lookout Mountain Battlefield

=== In popular culture ===
Lookout Mountain is referenced in the 1986 The Transformers: The Movie as an area where Daniel Witwicky and the Autobot Hot Rod were fishing when they noticed Decepticons aboard an incoming shuttle attempting to infiltrate Autobot City.

There are several Lookout Mountains within the continental United States. Which, if any, of these is the "Lookout Mountain" that appeared in The Movie is unclear. The pop-up commentary on the 20th Anniversary DVD states that this "Lookout Mountain" is in Chattanooga, Tennessee. In actuality, that Lookout Mountain is a plateau, with the northernmost point (as well as most of the tourist attractions and the city of Lookout Mountain, GA) just outside Chattanooga, with the majority being located in Georgia and Alabama.
