= Ocoee Dam No. 2 =

Hydroelectric dam in Tennessee

- Ocoee Hydroelectric Plant No. 2
- U.S. National Register of Historic Places
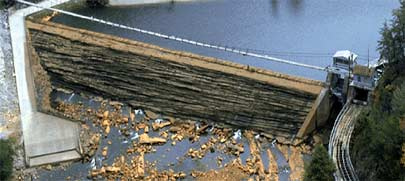
- Location: Polk County, Tennessee
- Coordinates: 35°4′58″N 84°29′28″W
- Built: 1912-1913
- Architect: J.G. White
- NRHP reference No.: 79002453
- Added to NRHP: 1979

Ocoee Dam Number 2 is a hydroelectric dam on the Ocoee River in Polk County in the U.S. state of Tennessee. The dam impounds the Ocoee No. 2 Reservoir and is one of four dams on the Toccoa/Ocoee River owned and operated by the Tennessee Valley Authority. It was completed in 1913.

Ocoee Dam No. 2 utilizes a wooden flume that carries water from the reservoir down the side of the Ocoee Gorge to the dam's powerhouse 5 miles (8.0 km) downstream. It is situated at the center of one of the nation's top whitewater rafting locations, and the dam's releases help to maintain consistent rapids on the river during warmer months.

== Location ==
Ocoee Dam No. 2 is located 24 miles (39 km) above the mouth of the Ocoee River, near the center of the Ocoee Gorge, a steep-sided valley sliced as the Ocoee winds its way westward through the Appalachian Mountains. Ocoee No. 2 is 12 miles (19 km) upstream from Ocoee Dam No. 1 and 5 miles (8.0 km) downstream from Ocoee Dam No. 3. The flume connecting Ocoee Dam No. 2 to its powerhouse winds its way along the cliffs overlooking the south side of the gorge before dropping the water to the powerhouse 5 miles (8.0 km) downstream from the dam. The dam and reservoir are surrounded by the Cherokee National Forest, and the only major road access is provided via the Ocoee Scenic Byway, a section of U.S. Route 64.

== Capacity ==
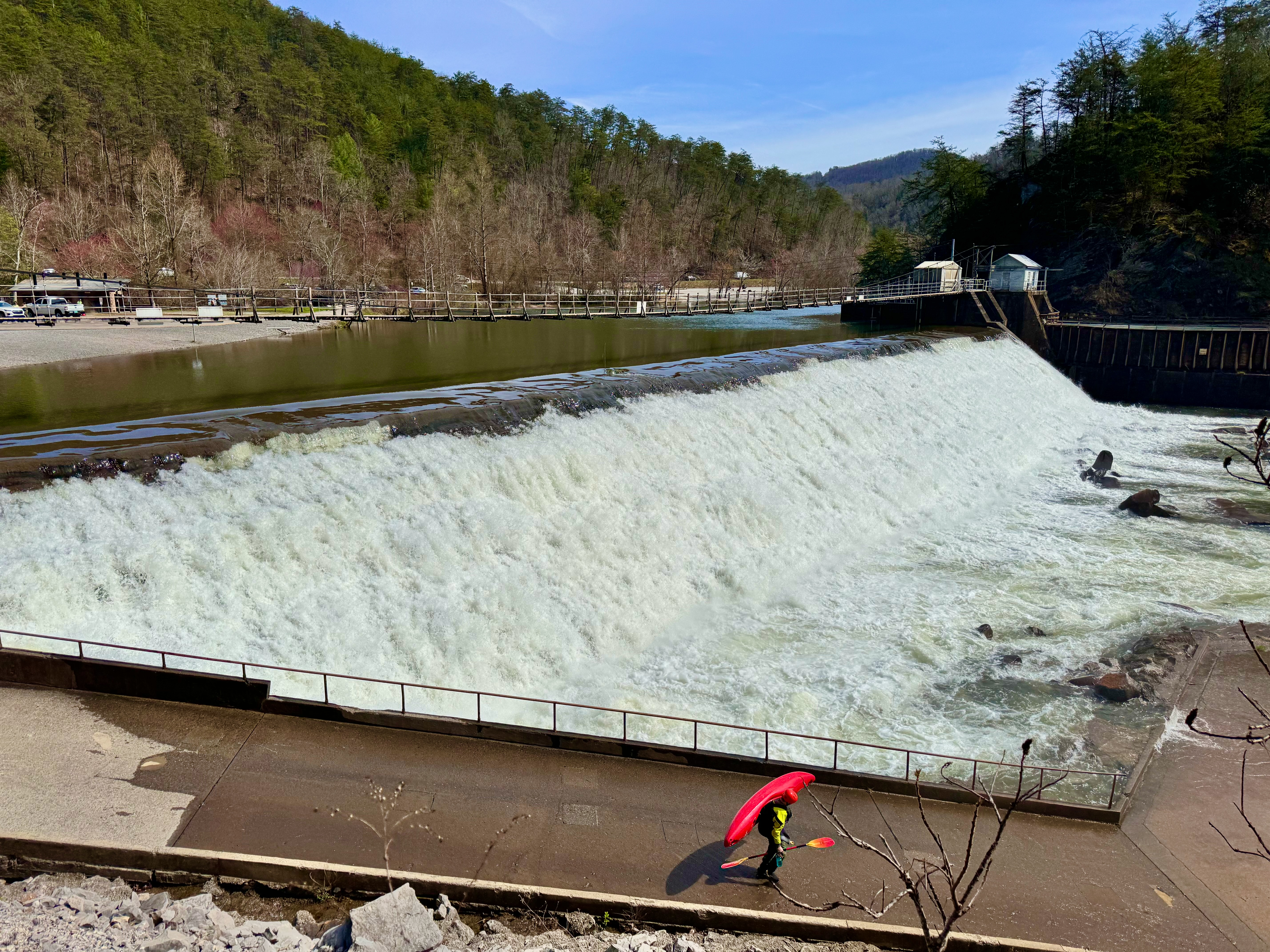
Water runs over Ocoee Dam No. 2

The dam is a rock-filled crib-type dam 30 feet (9.1 m) high and 450 feet (140 m) long. The two units at the powerhouse downstream from the dam have a generating capacity of 23,100 kilowatts. The dam typically schedules major recreational releases on weekends in spring and fall and five days per week in summer months.

The dam's flume consists of a wooden trough situated upon a shelf carved out of the cliffside. The trough carries the water to a point just above the powerhouse where it drops the water 250 feet (76 m) through two large steel pipes to the powerhouse below. Without this flume system, the dam (at just 30 feet high) would be practically useless as a power plant. There is a funicular railway at the powerhouse site that is used for transport from the powerhouse to the flume.

== History ==
The growth of industry in Chattanooga some 30 miles (48 km) west of the Ocoee River in the latter part of the 19th and early 20th centuries required large amounts of electric power. Several private entities attempted to meet this demand by building dams that could produce hydroelectricity. In 1910, a group of financiers formed the Eastern Tennessee Power Company to use the Ocoee's hydro-power potential. The company completed Ocoee Dam No. 1 in late 1911, and work began on Ocoee Dam No. 2 the following year.

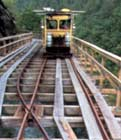
Train tracks carry service vehicles to maintain TVA's 14 feet (4.3 m) wide, 11 feet (3.4 m) deep flume.

To build the dam, a wooden "crib" was constructed of 10-foot (3.0 m) by 10-foot (3.0 m) timbers, and the crib was filled with stone. Engineers realized that if the dam were built at the ideal powerhouse site, it would be unable to utilize the potential energy from the five-mile stretch immediately upstream in which the river drops 250 feet (76 m) in elevation. Engineers solved this dilemma by constructing the 5-mile (8.0 km) flume on the cliffs above the river gorge, which allows just a 19-foot (5.8 m) drop in the water level from the point at which it exits the reservoir to the point at which it spills through the pipes into the powerhouse below. At 14 feet (4.3 m) by 11 feet (3.4 m), the flume was unusually large for its day. The dam was completed in 1913.

In 1922, Eastern Tennessee Power merged with several other entities to form the Tennessee Electric Power Company (TEPCO). TEPCO maintained Ocoee Dam No. 2 until 1939, when a U.S. Supreme Court decision forced the company to sell its assets to the Tennessee Valley Authority, which had been established to oversee flood control and development in the Tennessee Valley. The $78 million (equivalent to $1.38 billion in 2024) TVA paid for TEPCO included $2.59 million (equivalent to $45.7 million in 2024) for Ocoee Dam No. 2.

TVA made several improvements to the dam in the 1940s which increased the dam's generating capacity by 15%. The dam's basic diversion design was used by TVA in the construction of Ocoee Dam No. 3 several miles upstream in 1942.

An explosion rocked the Ocoee No. 2 powerhouse in 1949, ripping a massive hole in the side and roof of the brick building. A failed governor caused a generator to go uncontrolled and it exploded, injuring several workers. The building was repaired and returned to operation in 1951. By 1976, Ocoee No. 2's flume had deteriorated, and TVA decided to shut it down. To prevent it from being dismantled, several preservationist groups had the dam and flume placed on the National Register of Historic Places in 1979. TVA renovated the flume with treated wood and placed it back in operation in 1983.
