= Toccoa/Ocoee River =

River in Georgia and Tennessee in the United States

Coordinates: 35.2061°N 84.6578°W

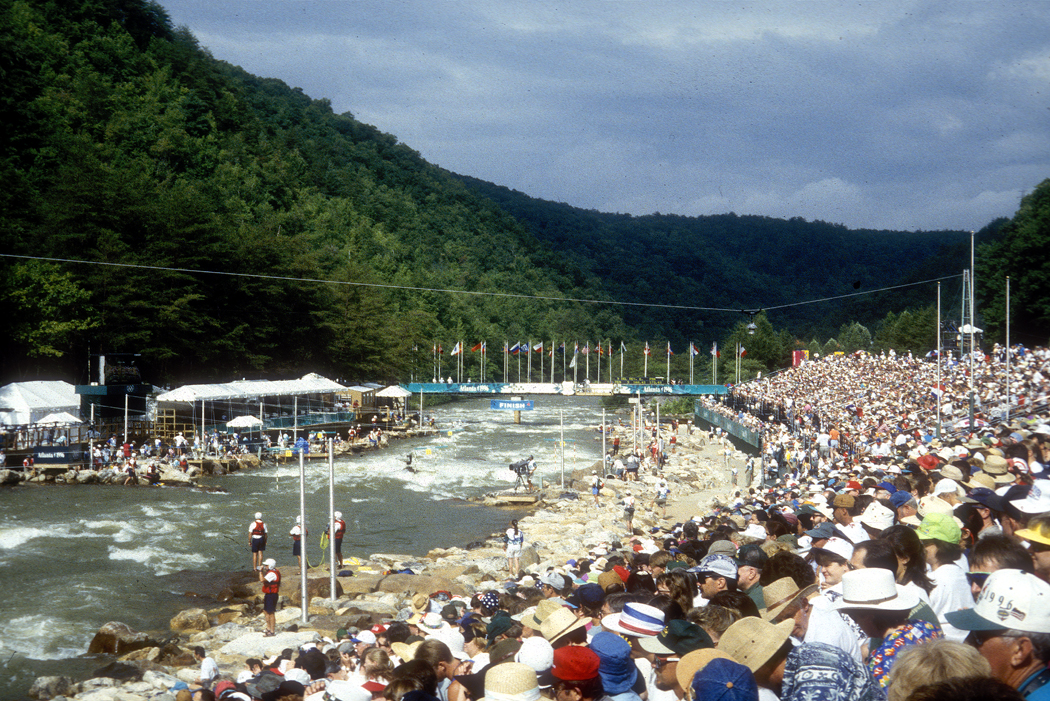
- The whitewater rapids of the Upper Ocoee during the 1996 Summer Olympics.

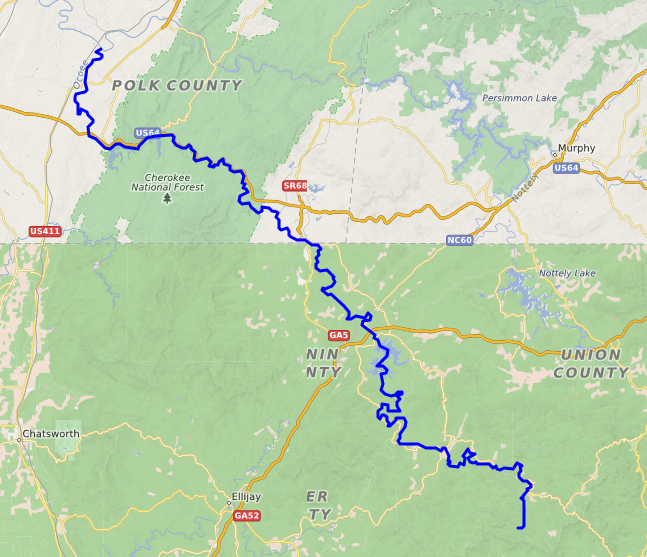

Physical characteristics
- Source
  - location: Confluence of Canada and Mauldin Creeks in Union County, Georgia
  - elevation: ~ 2,120 ft (650 m)
- Mouth
  - location: Hiwassee River in Polk County, Tennessee
  - elevation: ~ 750 ft (230 m)

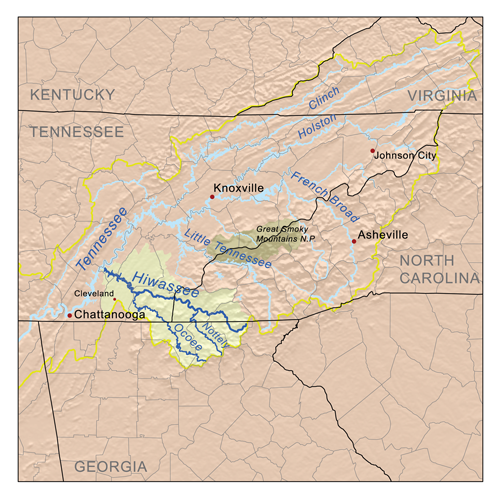
The Hiwassee drainage basin, which includes the Ocoee River, located within the upper Tennessee drainage basin

The Toccoa River and Ocoee River are the names in use for a single 93-mile-long (150 km) river that flows northwestward through the southern Appalachian Mountains of the southeastern United States. It is a tributary of the Hiwassee River, which it joins in Polk County, Tennessee, near the town of Benton. Four dams, three which are power generating, are operated along it.

== River course and history ==
The river is called the Toccoa for its 56 miles (90 km) through Georgia, until it reaches the twin cities of McCaysville, Georgia and Copperhill, Tennessee, at the truss bridge which connects Georgia 5 (Blue Ridge Street) with Tennessee 68 and Georgia 60 (Ocoee Street and Toccoa Street). The remainder is called the Ocoee through Tennessee. The Ocoee is known for its Class III-V whitewater rapids, appealing to kayakers and rafting enthusiasts. It is also home to the local salamander, Desmognathus ocoee. The upper section of the Ocoee was host to whitewater slalom events during the Centennial 1996 Summer Olympics held primarily in Atlanta, about 100 miles (160 km) to the south.

The name Ocoee originates from the Cherokee name for Passiflora incarnata, ocoee. Toccoa comes from a Cherokee word meaning "Catawba place" or "beautiful".

On February 16, 1990, flooding of the river submerged much of the central business district of the riverfront towns of Copperhill, Tennessee and McCaysville, Georgia. The river flooded again early on November 5, 2026, cresting just higher than the 1990 level, after very heavy rainfall near Blue Ridge. Once again, much of the business district was submerged, with numerous businesses sustaining heavy damage. Numerous water rescues took place along the river in both Fannin and Polk counties, including at least 80 in Fannin County and 68 in Polk County.

The area was once heavily mined for copper ore from the Copper Basin and polluted by smelting operations. Extensive logging and plant-destroying smog depleted topsoil and released polluted acid and metals into the area's streams. The area has since been cleaned and greened. Olympic kayaker Joe Jacobi led a successful effort to bring the Atlanta Olympic white-water event to the Ocoee River in 1996, and his wife Lisa, a former CNN news producer, left her job to open a downtown bed-and-breakfast and become a local internet entrepreneur.

== Dams and power generation ==
The Ocoee's flow is controlled by the Tennessee Valley Authority via three dams. Most often the riverbed is nearly dry in the ten-mile (16 km) stretch used for sporting, the water being diverted through flumes along the side of the river gorge. The dam was originally built in 1913 by the East Tennessee Power Company to provide hydroelectric power to the new Alcoa company, which was starting aluminum production operations in Blount County, Tennessee, south of Knoxville.

The three Ocoee dams are numbered sequentially, with #1 being the farthest downstream and #3 being the farthest upstream. TVA acquired the two original dams (Ocoee #1 and Ocoee #2) in 1939 and started building Ocoee #3 dam in 1940. These dams generate an average of 67,000 kilowatts of electricity in total. The Ocoee #2 dam diverts water from the middle section of the river through the flume. After a rock slide in September 1976 that damaged the flume, the TVA began a major overhaul of the flume system. During this time, the river, which had been dry during the early years of recreational whitewater sports, ran without diversion. The Ocoee gained the attention of paddlers and rafting companies who offered rafting trips to the public while the repairs were taking place. When the flume overhaul was finished, the Ocoee River Council was formed in order to secure future recreational releases from the TVA. After an extensive legal battle requiring an act of Congress, recreational releases were conceded by the TVA and the river runs most weekends from March through October. The Middle Section contains some 20 named Class III and IV rapids and provides recreational opportunities throughout its eight-month season. One of the largest rapids on the Middle Ocoee, "Hell's Hole," runs right beneath the bridge leading to the power station, with "Powerhouse", a significant ledge with a strong hydraulic, right after it. Upstream (to the southeast), TVA also operates Blue Ridge Dam, which creates Lake Blue Ridge (called Blue Ridge Reservoir by TVA).

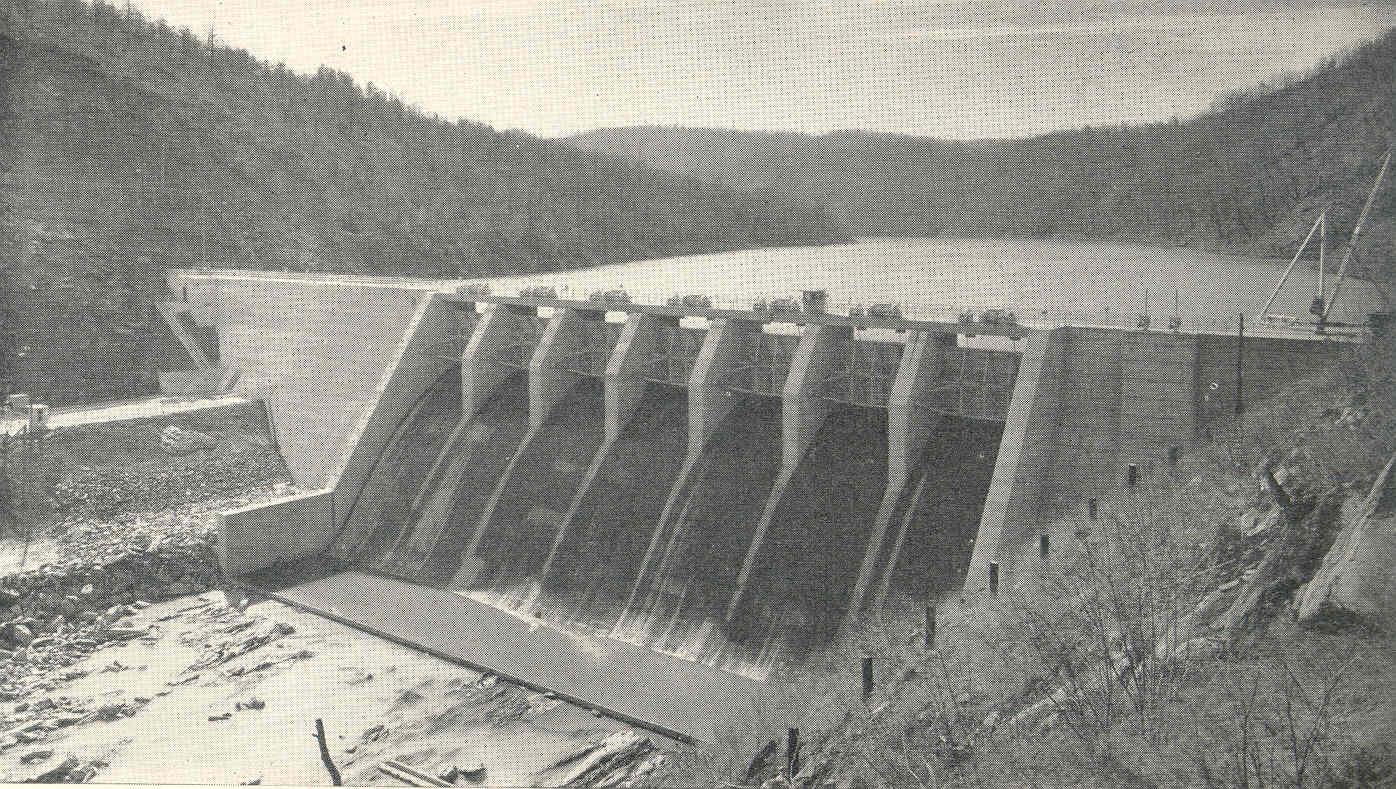
TVA's Ocoee Dam No. 3 on the Ocoee River in Polk County, Tennessee, ca. 1945

== Whitewater kayaking and rafting ==
The Canoe slalom events during the 1996 Summer Olympics were conducted on a half-mile Olympic whitewater course that is fed by releases of water from Ocoee #3. The Ocoee Whitewater Center was built by the U.S. Forest Service for this purpose, including a large building along U.S. Route 64, whose eastbound lanes were originally built for traffic which are now converted to be used as a parking and staging area. The center burned down in 2022. A 4.5-mile whitewater rafting area farther downstream is fed by water released from Ocoee Dam #2. The Olympic section was not open to the public until after the Olympics, while the middle section had been open to the public since the late 1970s. After the Olympics, rafting tours (including bus transportation) are provided by several different companies located in both directions on U.S. 64, which runs next to the river for a few miles (several kilometers). These outfitters provide other activities on and along the river such as biking, hiking, kayaking and lodging. Whitewater rafting is the most popular and is led by trained river guides through a number of rapids.

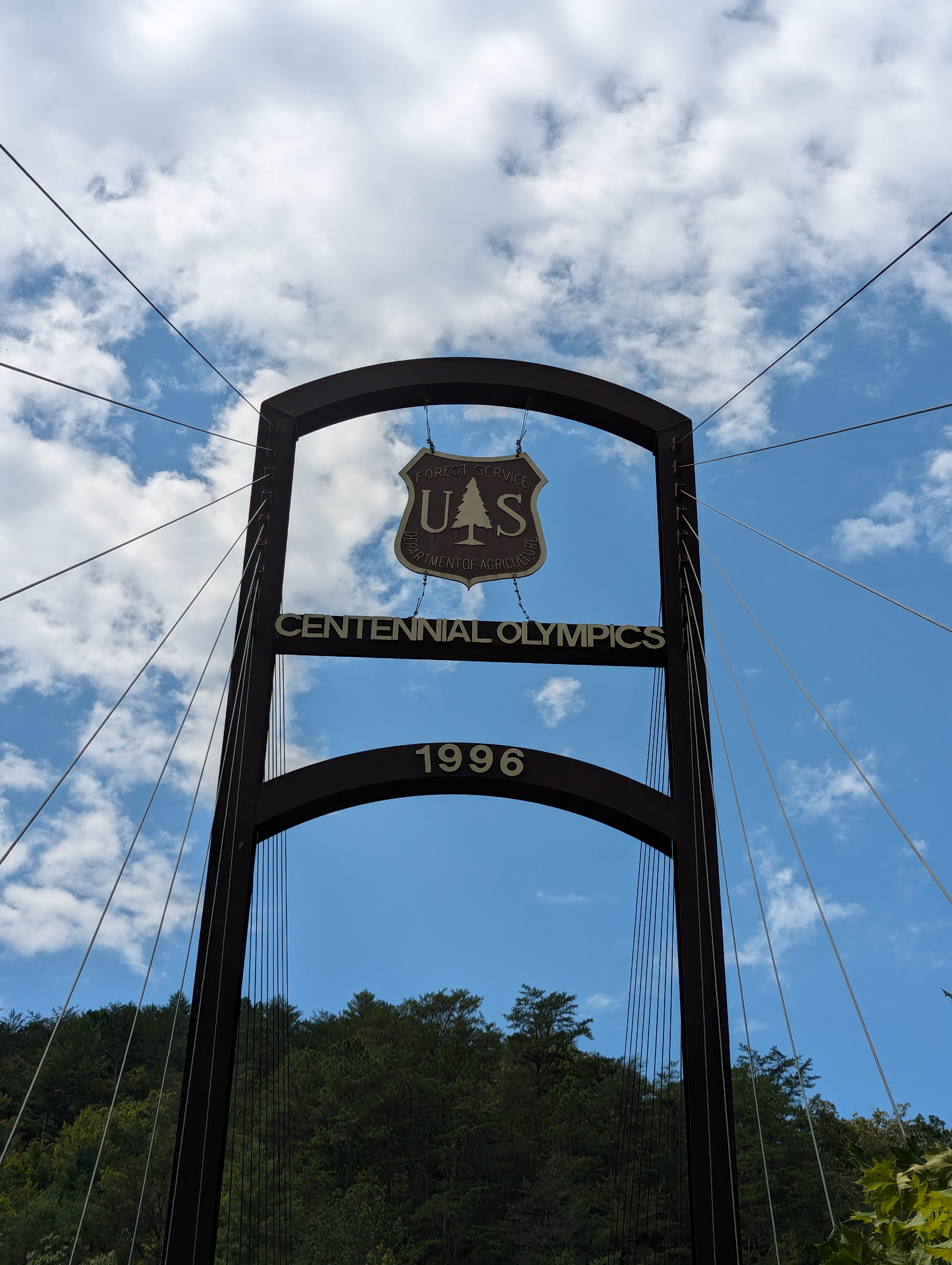
Detail of a bridge built over the river for the 1996 Olympics.

Rapids on the Middle:

Mile	Name	Difficulty
0.0	Dam No. 2	
0.0	Entrance/Grumpy	IV
0.2	Staging Eddy	III
0.3	Gonzo Shoals	III
0.7	Broken Nose	III+
0.8	Second Helping	III
1.1	Slice-n-Dice	III
1.1	Moonshoot	III
1.2	Double Suck	III+
1.4	Double Trouble	III
1.6	Left Right Left	III
1.9	Flipper	III
2.8	Surprise	III
3.1	Tablesaw	IV
3.2	Diamond Splitter	III
3.9	Accelerator	III
4.1	Cat's Pajamas	III
4.2	Hell's Hole	IV
4.3	Powerhouse Ledge	IV
4.6	Outfitter Takeout	
5.4	Private Boater Takeout	

Twenty-four rafting companies make use of the river and at peak times more than 750 people raft the river each day, as of 2025. Rafting on the Ocoee Olympic course takes place 34 days a year (usually on weekends) and rafting on the middle section takes place five days a week each summer. The Ocoee ranks as one of the top ten sites for whitewater rafting in the nation. As of 2025, more than 5 million people have rafted the river, the industry brings in approximately $43 million annually in economic benefits, and it supports more than 600 jobs.

== Variant names ==
The river was once known as the Ocowee River and, according to the Geographic Names Information System, the Toccoa/Ocoee River has also been known as:

- Taccoy River
- Tacoy River

== See also ==
- Passiflora incarnata (also known as the purple passionflower or "Ocoee" in Cherokee)
- Pityopsis ruthii (Pityopsis ruthii is a rare species of flowering plant in the aster family known by the common name Ruth's golden aster. It is endemic to the US state of Tennessee, where it is known only from Polk County. It is threatened by the modification of its habitat. It is a federally listed endangered species.)
- Noontootla Creek
- Shallowford Bridge
- List of rivers of Tennessee
- Ocoee Supergroup
