= East Tennessee =

Geographic region of Tennessee

Coordinates: 35.9°N 84.1°W

- Grand Division
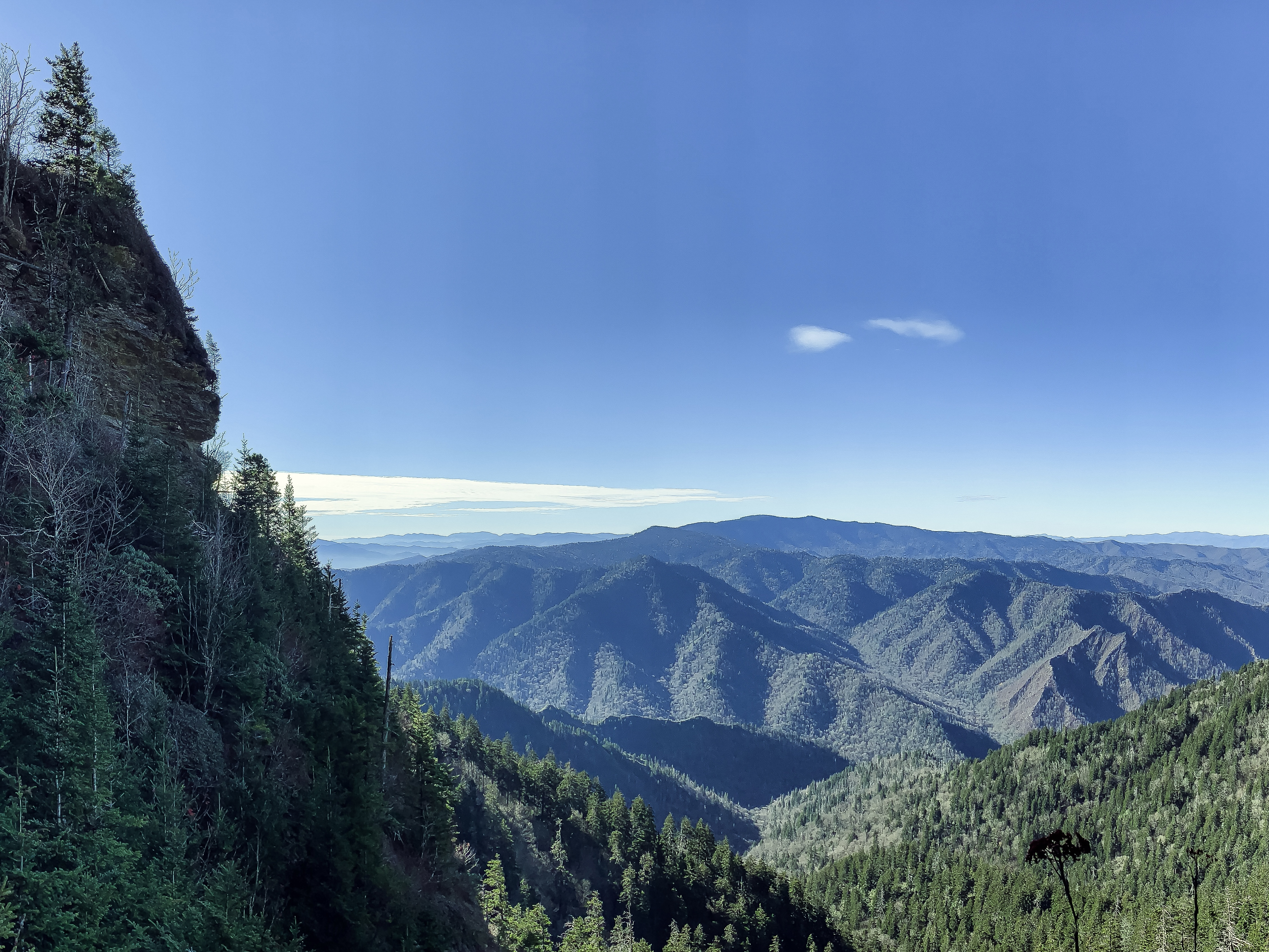
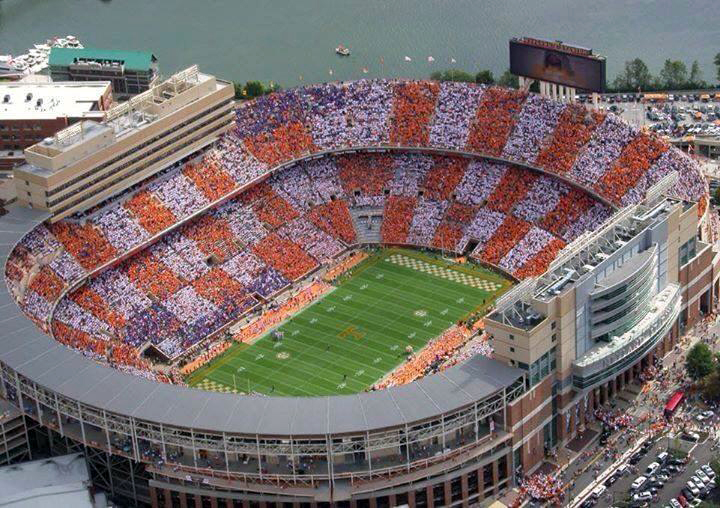
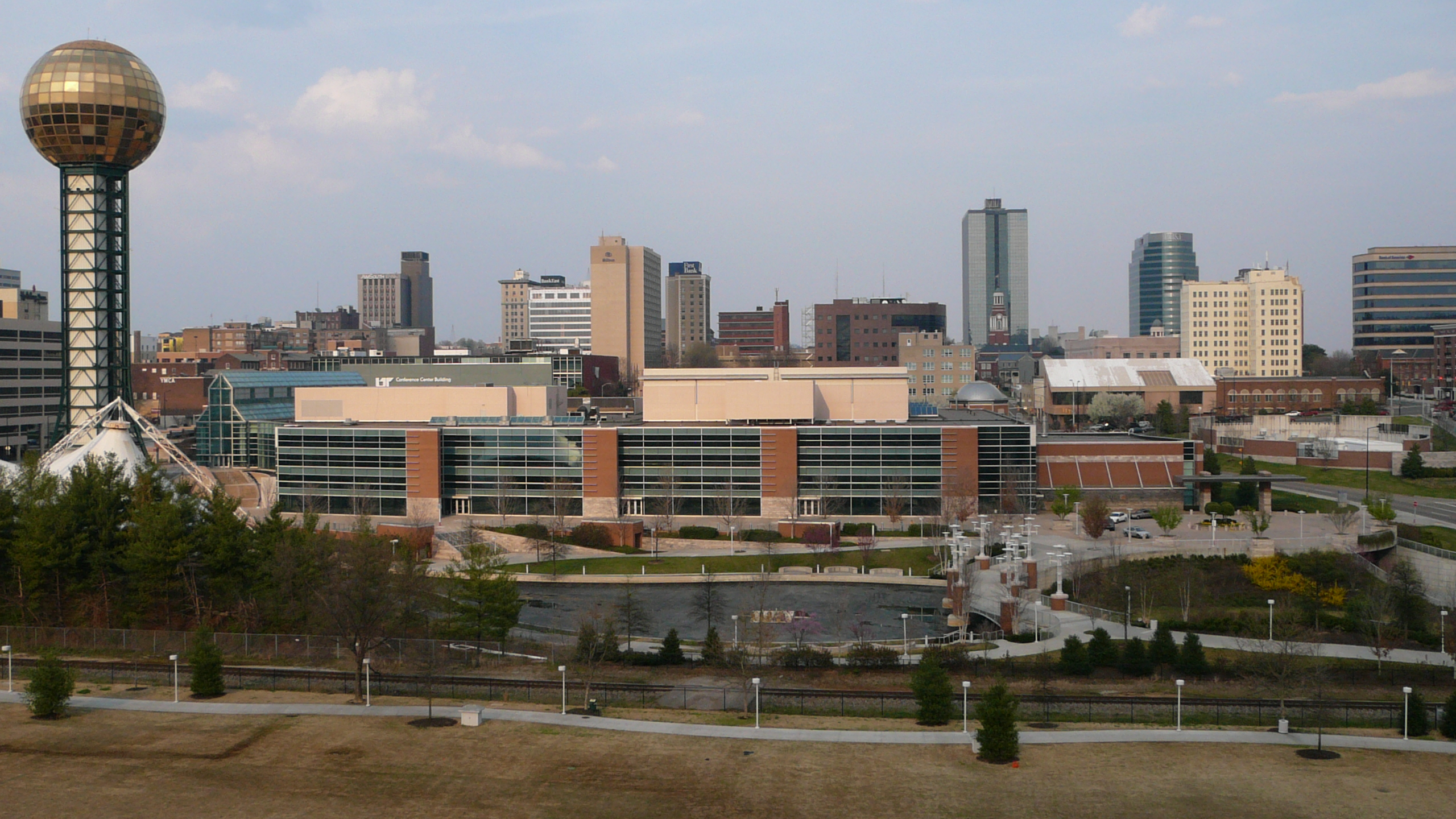
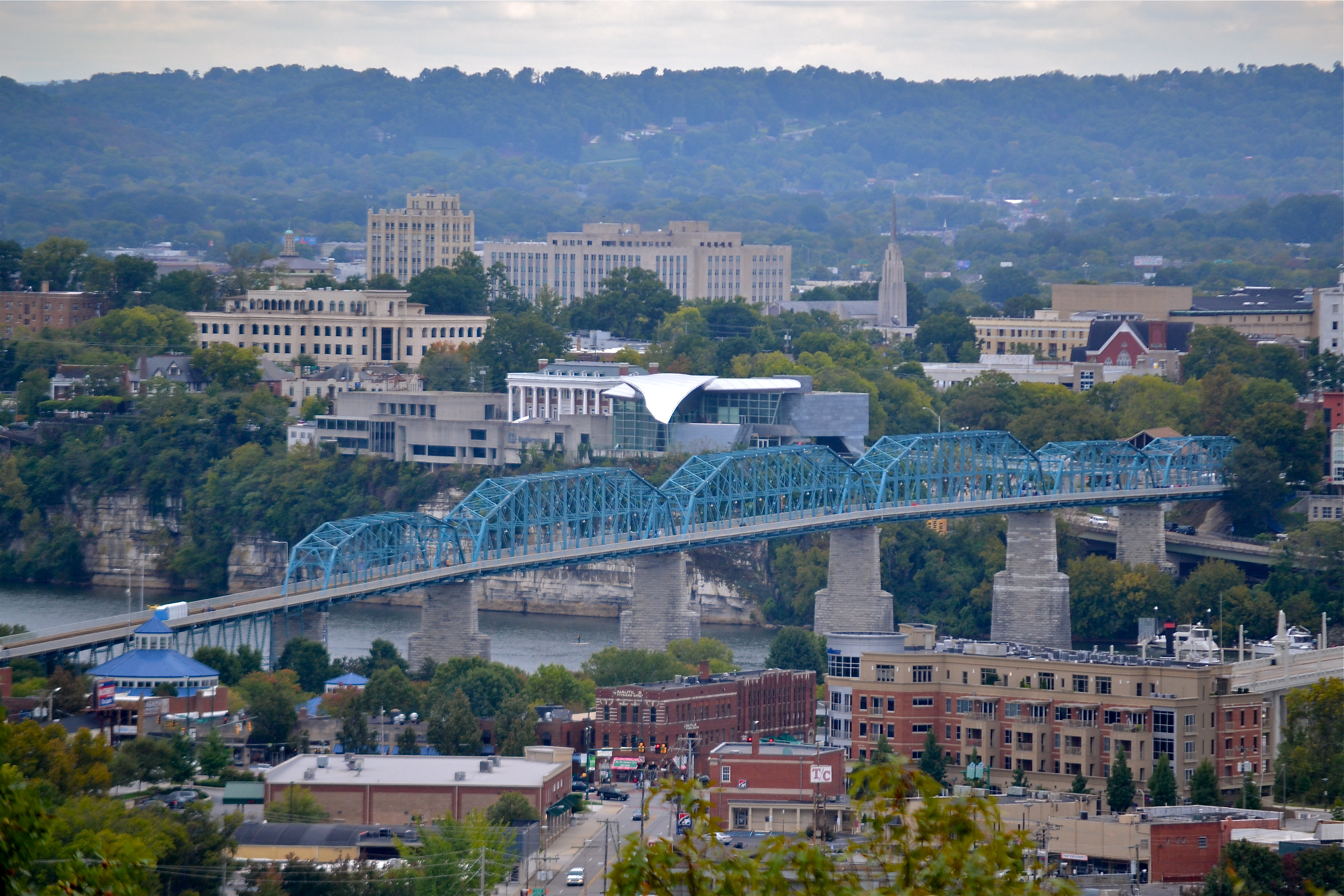
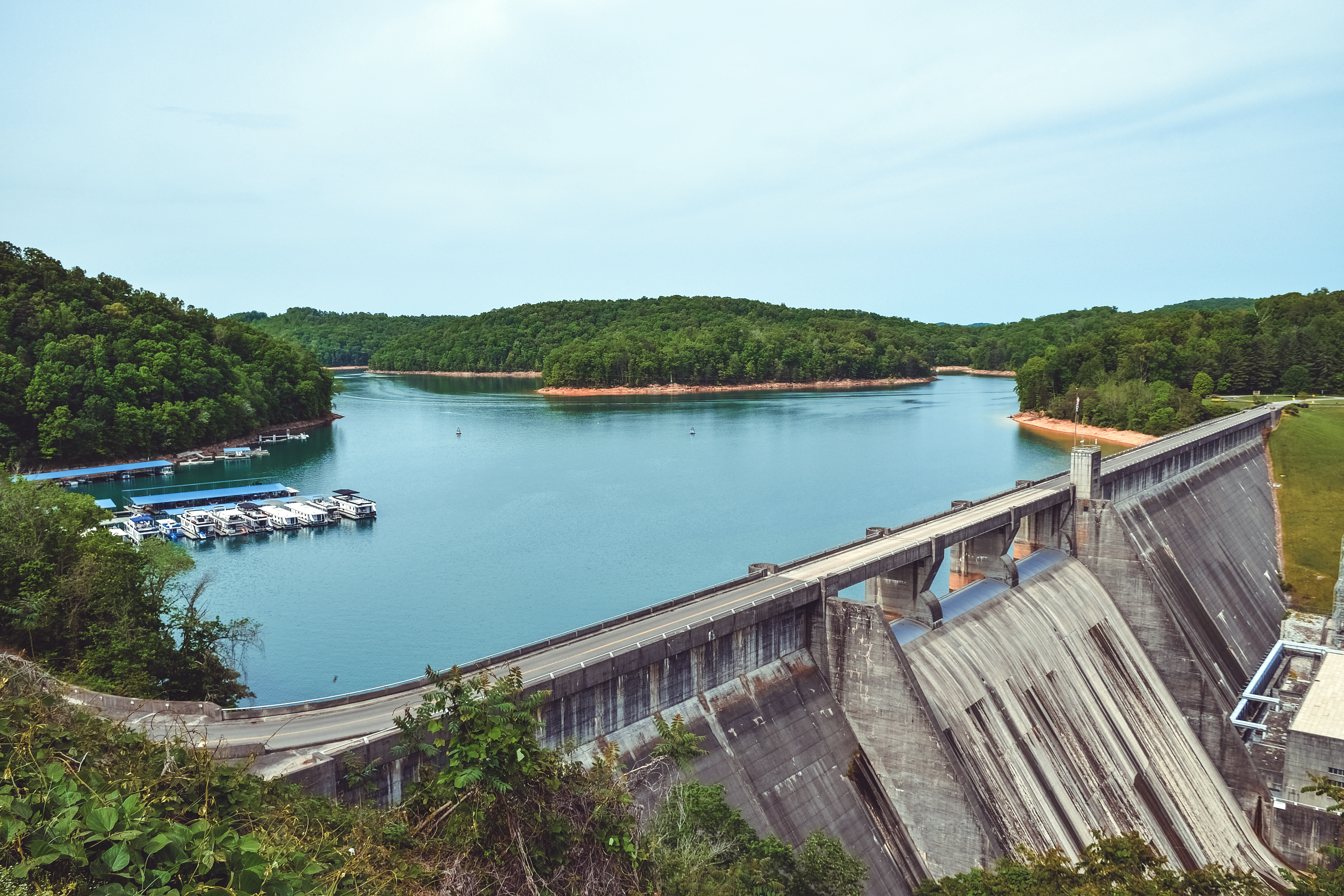
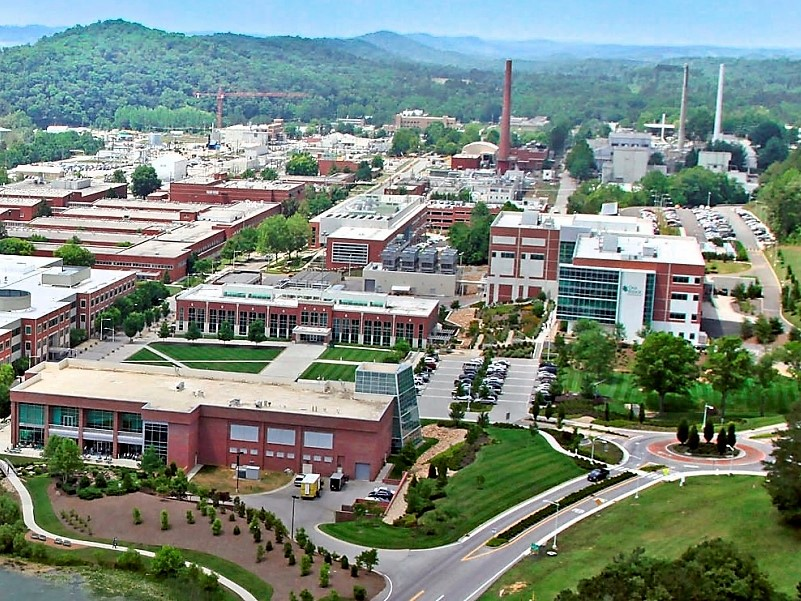
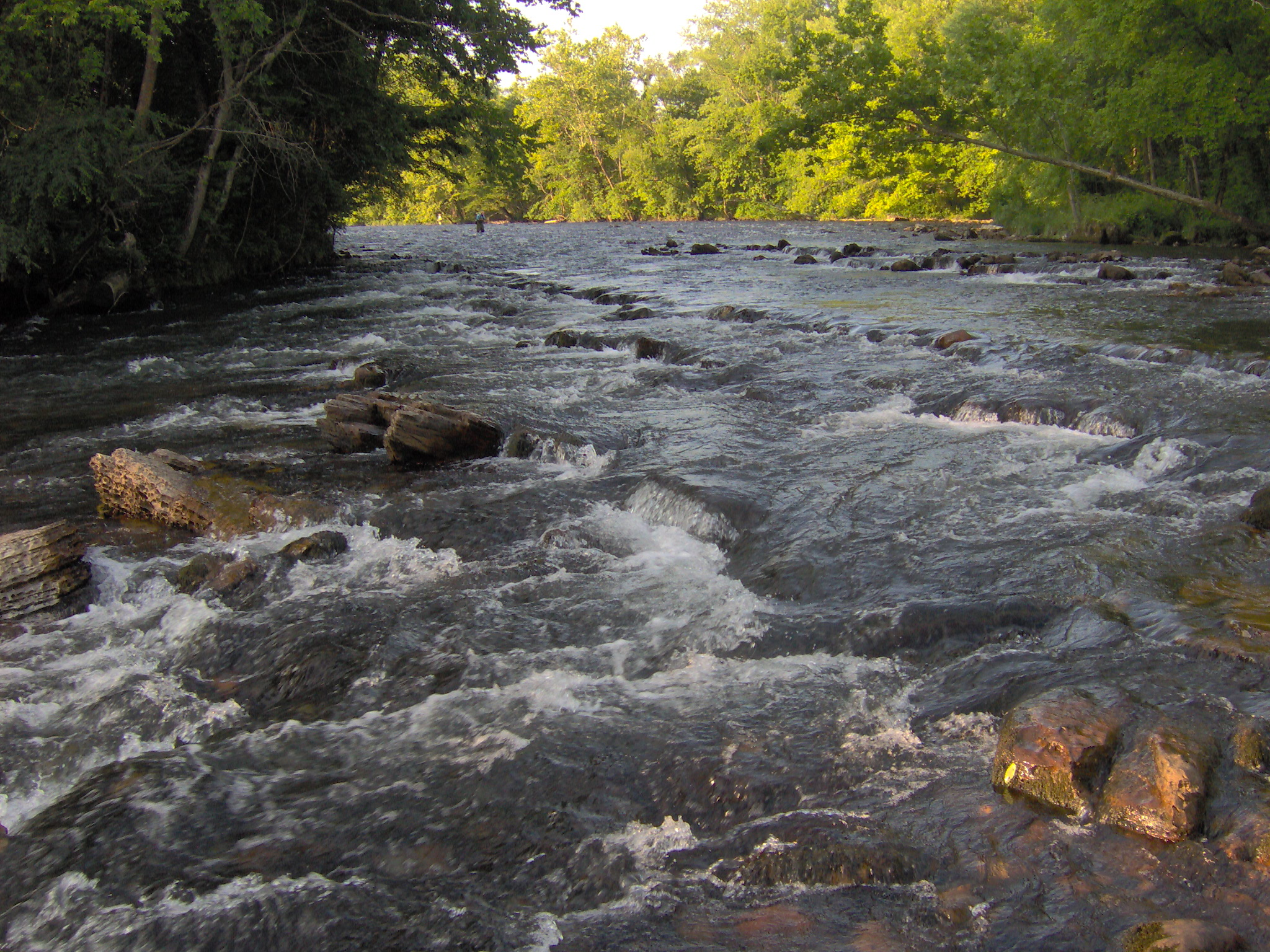
- From top (left to right): Kuwohi in Great Smoky Mountains National Park, Neyland Stadium at the University of Tennessee, skyline of Knoxville, skyline of Chattanooga, Norris Dam and its reservoir, Oak Ridge National Laboratory, Sycamore Shoals State Historic Area
- Nicknames: East TN, East Tenn.
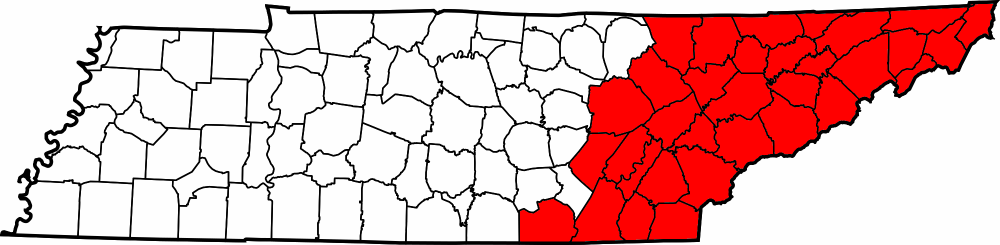
- The counties of East Tennessee highlighted in red
- Country: United States
- State: Tennessee
- Largest city: Knoxville

Area
  - Land: 13,558.27 sq mi (35,115.8 km^{2})

Population (2020)
  - Total: 2,470,105
  - Density: 182.18/sq mi (70.34/km^{2})
- Demonym: East Tennessean

East Tennessee is one of the three Grand Divisions of Tennessee defined in state law. Geographically and socioculturally distinct, it comprises approximately the eastern third of the U.S. state of Tennessee. East Tennessee consists of 33 counties, 30 located within the Eastern Time Zone and three counties in the Central Time Zone: Bledsoe, Cumberland, and Marion. East Tennessee is entirely located within the Appalachian Mountains, although the landforms range from densely forested 6,000-foot (1,800 m) mountains to broad river valleys. The region contains the major cities of Knoxville and Chattanooga, Tennessee's third and fourth largest cities, respectively, and the Tri-Cities, the state's sixth largest population center.

During the American Civil War, many East Tennesseans remained loyal to the Union even as the state seceded and joined the Confederacy. Early in the war, Unionist delegates unsuccessfully attempted to split East Tennessee into a separate state that would remain as part of the Union. After the war, a number of industrial operations were established in cities in the region. The Tennessee Valley Authority (TVA), created by Congress during the Great Depression in the 1930s, spurred economic development and helped to modernize the region's economy and society. The TVA would become the nation's largest public utility provider. Today, the TVA's administrative operations are headquartered in Knoxville, and its power operations are based in Chattanooga. Oak Ridge was the site of the world's first successful uranium enrichment operations, which were used to construct the world's first atomic bombs, two of which were dropped on Imperial Japan at the end of World War II. The Appalachian Regional Commission further transformed the region in the late 20th century.

East Tennessee is both geographically and culturally part of Appalachia. East Tennessee is home to the nation's most visited national park—the Great Smoky Mountains National Park—and hundreds of smaller recreational areas. East Tennessee is often considered the birthplace of country music, stemming from the 1927 Victor recording sessions in Bristol, and throughout the 20th and 21st centuries has produced a steady stream of musicians of national and international fame.

== Geography ==
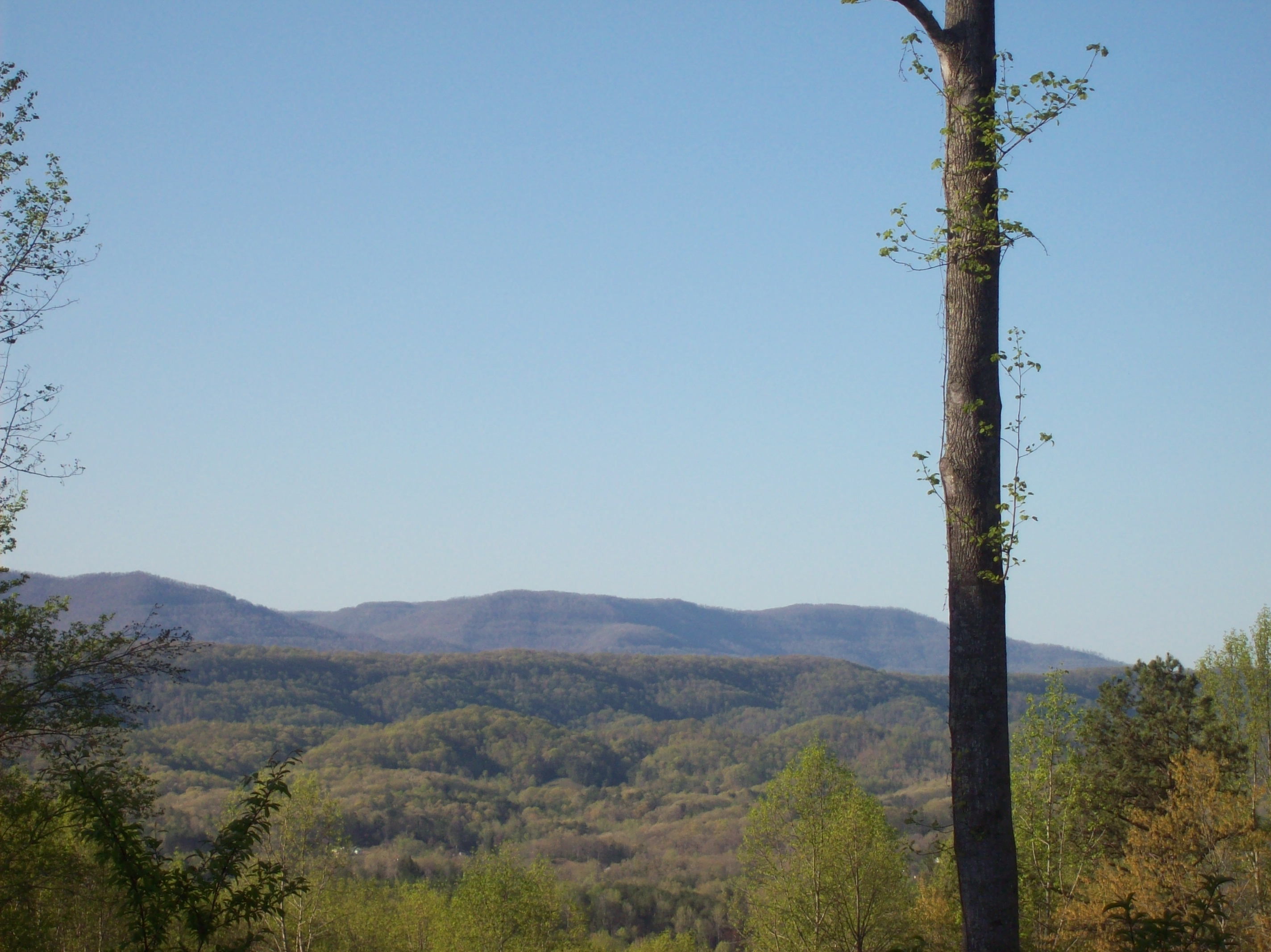
Hills in East Tennessee

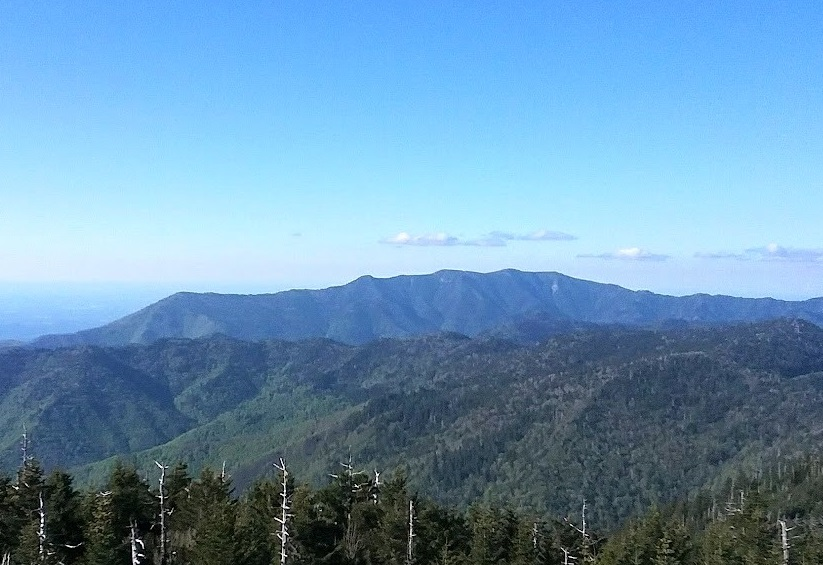
Mount Le Conte in East Tennessee's Great Smoky Mountains

Unlike the geographic designations of regions of most U.S. states, the term East Tennessee has legal as well as socioeconomic and cultural meaning. Along with Middle Tennessee and West Tennessee, it comprises one of the state's three Grand Divisions, whose boundaries are defined by state law. With a total land area of 13,558.27 square miles (35,115.8 km^{2}), comprises 32.90% of the state's land area and is the second-largest of the Grand Divisions, behind Middle Tennessee. The entirety of East Tennessee is both geographically and culturally part of Appalachia and the Appalachian Mountains and is usually considered part of the Upland South. East Tennessee borders North Carolina to the east, Virginia to the northeast, Kentucky to the north, Georgia to the south, and Alabama in the extreme southwest corner.

According to custom, the boundary between East and Middle Tennessee roughly follows the dividing line between Eastern and Central Time Zone. Exceptions to this rule are that Bledsoe, Cumberland, and Marion Counties are legally defined as part of East Tennessee, despite being within the Central Time Zone. Sequatchie County, located between Marion and Bledsoe Counties, is legally part of Middle Tennessee but is often considered part of East Tennessee. Sequatchie County has also been defined as part of East Tennessee in the past, and Marion County has been included in Middle Tennessee. Some of the northeastern counties of Middle Tennessee that supported the Union during the American Civil War, including Fentress and Pickett, are sometimes culturally considered part of East Tennessee. Fentress County in particular has been widely viewed by many as East Tennessee because it is located on the western edge of the Knoxville television market as opposed to Pickett County which is in the northeastern tip of Nashville television market.

=== Topography ===
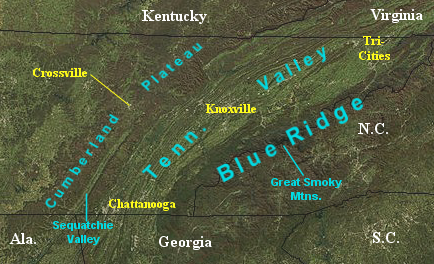
East Tennessee's major landforms

East Tennessee is located within three major geological divisions of the Appalachian Mountains: the Blue Ridge Mountains on the border with North Carolina in the east; the Ridge-and-Valley Appalachians (usually called the "Great Appalachian Valley" or "Tennessee Valley" (Note: Not to be confused with the Tennessee Valley, the drainage basin of the Tennessee River, part of which covers most of the Ridge-and-Valley region in East Tennessee.)) in the center; and the Cumberland Plateau in the west, part of which is in Middle Tennessee. The southern tip of the Cumberland Mountains also extends into the region between the Cumberland Plateau and Ridge-and-Valley regions. Both the Cumberland Plateau and Cumberland Mountains are part of the larger Appalachian Plateau.

The Blue Ridge section comprises the western section of the Blue Ridge Province, the crests of which form most of the Tennessee-North Carolina border. At an average elevation of 5,000 feet (1,500 m) above sea level, this physiographic province contains the highest elevations in the state. The Blue Ridge region is subdivided into several subranges—the Iron Mountains, Unaka Range, (Note: The term "Unaka Range" is sometimes used to refer to the entirety of the Blue Ridge range in Tennessee and North Carolina) and Bald Mountains in the north; the Great Smoky Mountains in the center; and the Unicoi Mountains, Little Frog Mountain, and Big Frog Mountain areas in the south. Kuwohi, at 6,643 feet (2,025 m), is the state's highest point and is located in the Great Smoky Mountains along the Tennessee-North Carolina border. Most of the Blue Ridge section is heavily forested and protected by various state and federal entities, the largest of which include the Great Smoky Mountains National Park and the Cherokee National Forest. The Appalachian Trail enters Tennessee in the Great Smoky Mountains and roughly follows the border with North Carolina most of the distance to near the Roan Mountain, where it shifts entirely into Tennessee.

The Ridge-and-Valley division is East Tennessee's largest, lowest lying, and most populous section. It consists of a series of alternating and paralleling elongate ridges with broad river valleys in between, roughly oriented northeast-to-southwest. This section's most notable feature, the Tennessee River, forms at the confluence of the Holston and French Broad rivers in Knoxville and flows southwestward to Chattanooga. The lowest point in East Tennessee, at an elevation of approximately 600 feet (180 m), is found where the Tennessee River enters Alabama in Marion County. Other notable rivers in the upper Tennessee watershed include the Clinch, Nolichucky, Watauga, Emory, Little Tennessee, Hiwassee, Sequatchie, and Ocoee rivers. Notable "ridges" in the Ridge-and-Valley range, which exceed elevations much greater than most surrounding ridges and are commonly referred to as mountains, include Clinch Mountain, Bays Mountain, and Powell Mountain.

The Cumberland Plateau rises nearly 1,000 feet (300 m) above the Appalachian Valley, stretching from the Kentucky border in the north to the Georgia and Alabama borders in the south. It has an average elevation of 2,000 feet (610 m) and consists mostly of flat-topped tablelands, although the northern section is slightly more rugged. The plateau has many waterfalls and stream valleys separated by steep gorges. The "Tennessee Divide" runs along the western part of the plateau, separating the watersheds of the Tennessee and Cumberland rivers. Plateau counties mostly east of this divide—i.e. Cumberland, Morgan, and Scott—are grouped with East Tennessee, whereas plateau counties west of this divide, such as Fentress, Van Buren, and Grundy, are considered part of Middle Tennessee. Most of the Sequatchie Valley, a long narrow valley in the southeastern part of the Cumberland Plateau, is in East Tennessee. (Note: Three counties— Bledsoe, Sequatchie, and Marion— are located in the Sequatchie Valley. These counties were traditionally part of East Tennessee. However, Sequatchie and Marion counties were reassigned to the Middle Tennessee grand division c. 1932. Marion County was later returned to East Tennessee, but Sequatchie County legally remains part of Middle Tennessee.) The part of the plateau east of the Sequatchie Valley is called Walden Ridge. One notable detached section of the plateau is Lookout Mountain, which overlooks Chattanooga. West of Chattanooga, the Tennessee River flows through the plateau in the Tennessee River Gorge.

The Cumberland Mountains begin directly north of the Sequatchie Valley and extend northward to the Cumberland Gap at the Tennessee-Kentucky-Virginia tripoint. While technically a separate physiographic region, the Cumberland Mountains are usually considered part of the Cumberland Plateau in Tennessee. The Cumberland Mountains reach elevations above 3,500 feet (1,100 m) in Tennessee, and their largest subrange is the Crab Orchard Mountains. The Cumberland Trail traverses the eastern escarpment of the Cumberland Plateau and Cumberland Mountains.

=== Counties ===
- Anderson
- Bledsoe
- Blount
- Bradley
- Campbell
- Carter
- Claiborne
- Cocke
- Cumberland
- Grainger
- Greene
- Hamblen
- Hamilton
- Hancock
- Hawkins
- Jefferson
- Johnson
- Knox
- Loudon
- Marion
- McMinn
- Meigs
- Monroe
- Morgan
- Polk
- Rhea
- Roane
- Scott
- Sevier
- Sullivan
- Unicoi
- Union
- Washington

The Official Tourism Website of Tennessee has a definition of East Tennessee slightly different from the legal definition; the website excludes Cumberland County while including Grundy and Sequatchie Counties.

== Climate ==
Climate data for Chattanooga Metropolitan Airport, Tennessee (1991–2020 normals, (Note: Mean monthly maxima and minima (i.e. the expected highest and lowest temperature readings at any point during the year or given month) calculated based on data at said location from 1991 to 2020.) extremes 1879–present (Note: Official records for Chattanooga kept at the Weather Bureau downtown from January 1879 to June 1940 and at Lovell Field since July 1940.))
Month	Jan	Feb	Mar	Apr	May	Jun	Jul	Aug	Sep	Oct	Nov	Dec	Year
Record high °F (°C)	78 (26)	82 (28)	89 (32)	93 (34)	99 (37)	107 (42)	107 (42)	105 (41)	104 (40)	100 (38)	86 (30)	78 (26)	107 (42)
Mean maximum °F (°C)	68.8 (20.4)	73.0 (22.8)	80.6 (27.0)	86.0 (30.0)	90.5 (32.5)	95.2 (35.1)	97.1 (36.2)	96.4 (35.8)	93.5 (34.2)	85.8 (29.9)	76.8 (24.9)	69.3 (20.7)	98.3 (36.8)
Mean daily maximum °F (°C)	51.0 (10.6)	55.6 (13.1)	64.1 (17.8)	73.6 (23.1)	81.0 (27.2)	87.6 (30.9)	90.5 (32.5)	89.8 (32.1)	84.3 (29.1)	74.1 (23.4)	62.0 (16.7)	53.2 (11.8)	72.2 (22.3)
Daily mean °F (°C)	41.7 (5.4)	45.6 (7.6)	53.2 (11.8)	61.7 (16.5)	70.0 (21.1)	77.4 (25.2)	80.7 (27.1)	80.0 (26.7)	73.9 (23.3)	62.7 (17.1)	51.2 (10.7)	44.3 (6.8)	61.9 (16.6)
Mean daily minimum °F (°C)	32.4 (0.2)	35.6 (2.0)	42.2 (5.7)	49.9 (9.9)	59.0 (15.0)	67.3 (19.6)	71.0 (21.7)	70.2 (21.2)	63.6 (17.6)	51.4 (10.8)	40.3 (4.6)	35.3 (1.8)	51.5 (10.8)
Mean minimum °F (°C)	14.9 (−9.5)	19.6 (−6.9)	25.5 (−3.6)	34.3 (1.3)	44.1 (6.7)	56.9 (13.8)	63.4 (17.4)	61.9 (16.6)	50.3 (10.2)	35.1 (1.7)	25.9 (−3.4)	20.8 (−6.2)	12.9 (−10.6)
Record low °F (°C)	−10 (−23)	−10 (−23)	2 (−17)	25 (−4)	34 (1)	39 (4)	51 (11)	50 (10)	36 (2)	22 (−6)	4 (−16)	−2 (−19)	−10 (−23)
Average precipitation inches (mm)	5.02 (128)	5.03 (128)	5.34 (136)	4.87 (124)	3.94 (100)	4.18 (106)	5.08 (129)	3.67 (93)	4.23 (107)	3.59 (91)	4.80 (122)	5.25 (133)	55.00 (1,397)
Average snowfall inches (cm)	1.0 (2.5)	1.2 (3.0)	1.1 (2.8)	0.0 (0.0)	0.0 (0.0)	0.0 (0.0)	0.0 (0.0)	0.0 (0.0)	0.0 (0.0)	0.0 (0.0)	0.0 (0.0)	0.3 (0.76)	3.6 (9.1)
Average precipitation days (≥ 0.01 in)	10.6	11.1	11.4	10.1	10.6	11.4	11.9	9.4	7.9	7.9	9.1	11.3	122.7
Average snowy days (≥ 0.1 in)	0.7	1.1	0.3	0.0	0.0	0.0	0.0	0.0	0.0	0.0	0.0	0.3	2.4
Average relative humidity (%)	71.2	68.2	65.9	63.8	71.5	73.1	74.9	76.0	77.0	74.6	73.5	72.9	71.9
Mean monthly sunshine hours	147.0	155.6	200.5	240.2	275.6	275.5	265.2	256.8	227.9	218.8	158.7	140.4	2,562.2
Percentage possible sunshine	47	51	54	61	64	63	60	62	61	63	51	46	58
Source: NOAA (relative humidity and sun 1961–1990)

Climate data for Knoxville (McGhee Tyson Airport), 1991−2020 normals, (Note: Mean monthly maxima and minima (i.e. the expected highest and lowest temperature readings at any point during the year or given month) calculated based on data at said location from 1991 to 2020.) extremes 1871–present (Note: Official records for Knoxville kept January 1871 to February 1942 at downtown and at McGhee Tyson Airport since March 1942. For more information, see Threadex)
Month	Jan	Feb	Mar	Apr	May	Jun	Jul	Aug	Sep	Oct	Nov	Dec	Year
Record high °F (°C)	77 (25)	83 (28)	88 (31)	93 (34)	96 (36)	105 (41)	105 (41)	102 (39)	103 (39)	96 (36)	85 (29)	80 (27)	105 (41)
Mean maximum °F (°C)	68.1 (20.1)	71.7 (22.1)	78.4 (25.8)	84.5 (29.2)	89.0 (31.7)	93.1 (33.9)	95.1 (35.1)	94.0 (34.4)	91.6 (33.1)	84.0 (28.9)	75.8 (24.3)	69.1 (20.6)	96.0 (35.6)
Mean daily maximum °F (°C)	48.2 (9.0)	52.8 (11.6)	61.4 (16.3)	71.2 (21.8)	78.9 (26.1)	85.7 (29.8)	88.4 (31.3)	87.8 (31.0)	82.5 (28.1)	71.7 (22.1)	60.0 (15.6)	51.0 (10.6)	70.0 (21.1)
Daily mean °F (°C)	39.1 (3.9)	42.9 (6.1)	50.6 (10.3)	59.6 (15.3)	67.9 (19.9)	75.3 (24.1)	78.5 (25.8)	77.6 (25.3)	71.8 (22.1)	60.3 (15.7)	49.0 (9.4)	41.9 (5.5)	59.5 (15.3)
Mean daily minimum °F (°C)	30.0 (−1.1)	33.1 (0.6)	39.8 (4.3)	48.0 (8.9)	56.9 (13.8)	64.9 (18.3)	68.7 (20.4)	67.5 (19.7)	61.1 (16.2)	48.9 (9.4)	38.1 (3.4)	32.8 (0.4)	49.2 (9.6)
Mean minimum °F (°C)	11.6 (−11.3)	16.8 (−8.4)	22.6 (−5.2)	32.6 (0.3)	41.4 (5.2)	54.6 (12.6)	61.4 (16.3)	59.9 (15.5)	48.3 (9.1)	33.4 (0.8)	24.0 (−4.4)	18.0 (−7.8)	9.0 (−12.8)
Record low °F (°C)	−24 (−31)	−10 (−23)	1 (−17)	22 (−6)	32 (0)	42 (6)	49 (9)	49 (9)	35 (2)	24 (−4)	5 (−15)	−6 (−21)	−24 (−31)
Average precipitation inches (mm)	4.76 (121)	4.81 (122)	4.89 (124)	4.71 (120)	4.13 (105)	4.24 (108)	5.25 (133)	3.63 (92)	3.49 (89)	2.81 (71)	4.21 (107)	5.00 (127)	51.93 (1,319)
Average snowfall inches (cm)	1.7 (4.3)	1.4 (3.6)	0.9 (2.3)	0.0 (0.0)	0.0 (0.0)	0.0 (0.0)	0.0 (0.0)	0.0 (0.0)	0.0 (0.0)	0.0 (0.0)	0.1 (0.25)	0.5 (1.3)	4.6 (12)
Average precipitation days (≥ 0.01 in)	11.5	11.7	12.7	11.1	11.1	12.0	11.6	9.8	7.8	8.0	9.4	12.0	128.7
Average snowy days (≥ 0.1 in)	1.2	1.3	0.7	0.0	0.0	0.0	0.0	0.0	0.0	0.0	0.2	0.6	4.0
Average relative humidity (%)	71.7	68.0	64.8	63.3	70.8	73.5	75.7	76.3	76.1	73.0	71.8	72.9	71.5
Mean monthly sunshine hours	135.8	145.3	208.9	256.6	287.2	291.1	287.3	278.0	232.3	217.2	151.7	122.5	2,613.9
Percentage possible sunshine	44	48	56	65	66	67	65	67	62	62	49	40	59
Source: NOAA (relative humidity and sun 1961–1990)

Most of East Tennessee has a humid subtropical climate, with the exception of some of the higher elevations in the Blue Ridge and Cumberland Mountains, which are classified as a cooler mountain temperate or humid continental climate. As the highest-lying region in the state, East Tennessee averages slightly lower temperatures than the rest of the state and has the highest rate of snowfall, which averages more than 80 inches (200 cm) annually in the highest mountains, although many of the lower elevations often receive no snow. The lowest recorded temperature in state history, at −32 °F (−36 °C), was recorded at Mountain City on December 30, 1917. Fog is common, especially in the Ridge-and-Valley region, and often presents a significant hazard to motorists.

== Demographics ==
Historical population
Census	Pop.	Note	%±
1790	25,030		—
1800	73,419		193.3%
1810	101,367		38.1%
1820	138,023		36.2%
1830	196,357		42.3%
1840	224,259		14.2%
1850	260,397		16.1%
1860	301,001		15.6%
1870	332,547		10.5%
1880	428,704		28.9%
1890	543,091		26.7%
1900	640,222		17.9%
1910	732,471		14.4%
1920	814,648		11.2%
1930	960,133		17.9%
1940	1,101,099		14.7%
1950	1,288,886		17.1%
1960	1,377,281		6.9%
1970	1,486,765		7.9%
1980	1,768,149		18.9%
1990	1,832,138		3.6%
2000	2,108,133		15.1%
2010	2,327,544		10.4%
2020	2,470,105		6.1%
Source: 1910–2020

East Tennessee is the second most populous and most densely populated of the three Grand Divisions. At the 2020 census, it had 2,470,105 inhabitants living in its 33 counties, an increase of 142,561, or 6.12%, over the 2010 figure of 2,327,544 residents. Its population was 35.74% of the state's total, and its population density was 182.18 inhabitants per square mile (70.34/km^{2}). Prior to the 2010 census, East Tennessee was the most populous of the Grand Divisions but was surpassed by Middle Tennessee, which contains the rapidly-growing Nashville and Clarksville metropolitan areas.

Demographically, East Tennessee is one of the regions in the United States with one of the highest concentrations of people who identify as White or European American. In the 2010 census, every county in East Tennessee except for Knox and Hamilton, the two most populous counties, had a population that was greater than 90% White. In most counties in East Tennessee, persons of Hispanic or Latino origins outnumber African Americans, which is uncommon in the Southeastern United States. Large African American populations are found in Chattanooga and Knoxville, as well as considerable populations in several smaller cities.

=== Cities and metropolitan areas ===
The major cities of East Tennessee are Knoxville, which is near the geographic center of the region; Chattanooga, which is in southeastern Tennessee at the Georgia border; and the "Tri-Cities" of Bristol, Johnson City, and Kingsport, located in the extreme northeastern part of the state. Of the ten metropolitan statistical areas in Tennessee, six are in East Tennessee. Combined statistical areas include Knoxville-Morristown-Sevierville, Chattanooga–Cleveland–Dalton, and Tri-Cities.

Knoxville, with about 190,000 residents, is the state's third largest city and contains the state's third largest metropolitan area, with about 1 million residents. Chattanooga, with a population of more than 180,000, is the state's fourth largest city and anchors a metropolitan area with more than 500,000 residents, of whom approximately one-third live in Georgia. The Tri-Cities, while defined by the Office of Management and Budget as the Kingsport-Bristol and Johnson City metropolitan areas, are usually considered one population center, which is the third-most populous in East Tennessee and the fifth-largest statewide.

Most of East Tennessee's population is found in the Ridge-and Valley region, including that of its major cities. Other important cities in the Ridge and Valley region include Cleveland, Athens, Maryville, Oak Ridge, Sevierville, Morristown, and Greeneville. The region also includes the Cleveland and Morristown metropolitan areas, each of which contain more than 100,000 residents. The Blue Ridge section of the state is much more sparsely populated, its main cities being Elizabethton, Pigeon Forge, and Gatlinburg. Crossville is the largest city in the plateau region, which is also sparsely populated.

Most residents of the East Tennessee region commute by car with the lack of alternative modes of transportation such as commuter rail or regional bus systems. Residents of the metropolitan areas for Knoxville, Morristown, Chattanooga, and the Tri-Cities region have an estimated one-way commute of 23 minutes.

Largest cities or towns in East Tennessee Source:
Rank		County	Pop.
1	Knoxville	Knox	190,740
2	Chattanooga	Hamilton	181,099
3	Johnson City	Washington	71,046
4	Kingsport	Sullivan	55,442
5	Cleveland	Bradley	47,356
6	Maryville	Blount	31,907
7	Oak Ridge	Anderson	31,402
8	Morristown	Hamblen	30,431
9	Bristol	Sullivan	27,147
10	Farragut	Knox	23,506

== Congressional districts ==
East Tennessee includes all of the state's 1st, 2nd, and 3rd congressional districts and part of the 4th district. The 1st District is concentrated around the Tri-Cities region and Upper East Tennessee. The 2nd District includes Knoxville and the mountain counties to the south. The 3rd District includes the Chattanooga area and the counties north of Knoxville (the two areas are connected by a narrow corridor in eastern Roane County). The 4th, which extends into an area southeast of Nashville, includes several of East Tennessee's Cumberland Plateau counties.

== History ==
=== Native Americans ===
Much of what is known about East Tennessee's prehistoric Native Americans comes as a result of the Tennessee Valley Authority's reservoir construction, as federal law required archaeological investigations to be conducted in areas that were to be flooded. Excavations at the Icehouse Bottom site near Vonore revealed that Native Americans were living in East Tennessee on at least a semi-annual basis as early as 7,500 B.C. The region's significant Woodland period (1000 B.C. – 1000 A.D.) sites include Rose Island (also near Vonore) and Moccasin Bend (near Chattanooga).

During what archaeologists call the Mississippian period (c. 1000–1600 A.D.), East Tennessee's indigenous inhabitants were living in complex agrarian societies at places such as Toqua and Hiwassee Island, and had formed a minor chiefdom known as Chiaha in the French Broad Valley. Spanish expeditions led by Hernando de Soto, Tristan de Luna, and Juan Pardo all visited East Tennessee's Mississippian-period inhabitants during the 16th century. Some of the Native peoples who are known to have inhabited the region during this time include the Muscogee Creek, Yuchi, and Shawnee.

By the early 18th century, most Natives in Tennessee had disappeared, very likely wiped out by diseases introduced by the Spaniards, leaving the region sparsely populated. The Cherokee began migrating into what is now East Tennessee from what is now Virginia in the latter 17th century, possibly to escape expanding European settlement and diseases in the north. The Cherokee established a series of towns concentrated in the Little Tennessee and Hiwassee valleys that became known as the Overhill towns, since traders from North Carolina, South Carolina, and Virginia had to cross over the mountains to reach them. Early in the 18th century, the Cherokee forced the remaining members of other Native American groups out of the state.

=== Pioneer period ===
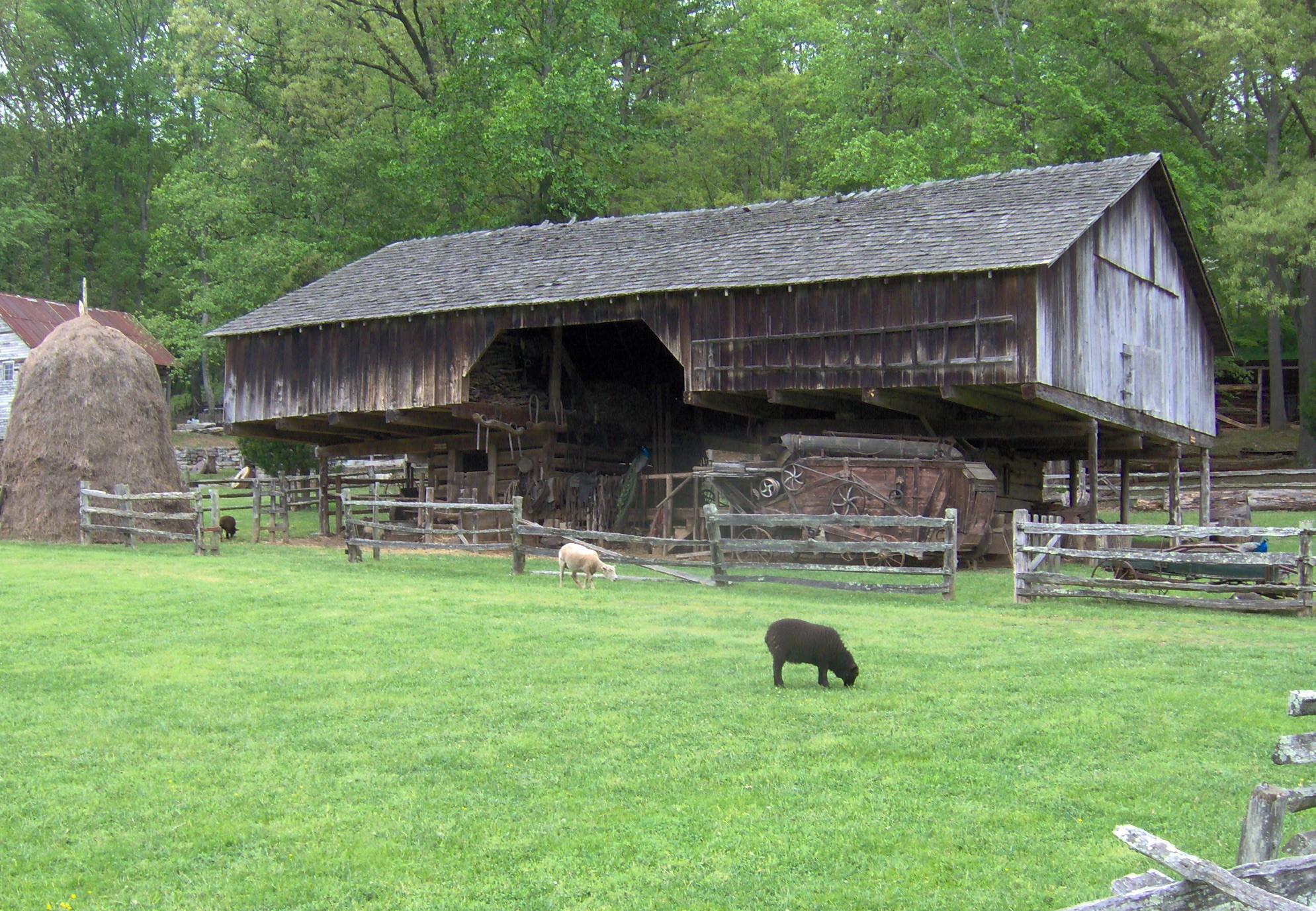
Early settlers of East Tennessee developed and constructed a unique type of double-cantilever barn, like this one in Norris, which evolved from an earlier design in Pennsylvania.

The first recorded Europeans and Africans to reach the area were three expeditions led by Spanish explorers: Hernando de Soto in 1540–1541, Tristan de Luna in 1559, and Juan Pardo in 1566–1567. Pardo recorded the name "Tanasqui" from a local Native American village, which evolved into the state's current name. In 1673, Abraham Wood, a British fur trader, sent an expedition led by James Needham and Gabriel Arthur from Fort Henry in the Colony of Virginia into Overhill Cherokee territory in modern-day northeastern Tennessee. Needham was killed during the expedition and Arthur was taken prisoner, and remained with the Cherokees for more than a year. Longhunters from Virginia explored much of East Tennessee in the 1750s and 1760s in expeditions which lasted several months or even years.

The Cherokee alliance with Britain during the French and Indian War led to the construction of Fort Loudoun in 1756 near present-day Vonore, which was the first British settlement in what is now Tennessee. Fort Loudoun was the westernmost British outpost to that date and was designed by John William Gerard de Brahm and constructed by forces under Captain Raymond Demeré. Shortly after its completion, Demeré relinquished command of the fort to his brother, Captain Paul Demeré. Hostilities erupted between the British and the Overhill Cherokees into an armed conflict, and a siege of the fort ended with its surrender in 1760. The next morning, Paul Demeré and many his men were killed in an ambush nearby, and most of the rest of the garrison was taken prisoner. A peace expedition led by Henry Timberlake in 1761 provided later travelers with invaluable knowledge regarding the location of the Overhill towns and the customs of the Overhill Cherokee.

The end of the French and Indian War in 1763 brought a stream of explorers and traders into the region, among them additional longhunters. In an effort to mitigate conflicts with the Natives, Britain issued the Royal Proclamation of 1763 which forbade settlements west of the Appalachian Mountains. Despite this proclamation, migration across the mountains continued, and the first permanent European settlers began arriving in northeastern Tennessee in the late 1760s. In 1769 William Bean, an associate of famed explorer Daniel Boone, built what is generally acknowledged as Tennessee's first permanent Euro-American residence in Tennessee along the Watauga River in present-day Johnson City. Shortly thereafter, James Robertson and a group of migrants from North Carolina (some historians suggest they were refugees of the Regulator wars) formed the Watauga Settlement at Sycamore Shoals in modern-day Elizabethton on lands leased from the Cherokees.

In 1772, the Wataugans established the Watauga Association, which was the first constitutional government west of the Appalachians and the germ cell of the state of Tennessee. Most of these settlers were English or of primarily English descent, but nearly 20% of them were Scotch-Irish. In 1775, the settlers reorganized themselves into the Washington District to support the cause of the American Revolutionary War, which had begun months before. The following year, the settlers petitioned the Colony of Virginia to annex the Washington District to provide protection from Native American attacks, which was denied. Later that year, they petitioned the government of North Carolina to annex the Washington District, which was granted in November 1776.

In 1775, Richard Henderson negotiated a series of treaties with the Cherokee to sell the lands of the Watauga settlements. Later that year, Daniel Boone, under Henderson's employment, blazed a trail from Fort Chiswell in Virginia through the Cumberland Gap, which became part of the Wilderness Road, a major thoroughfare for settlers into Tennessee and Kentucky. That same year, a faction of Cherokees led by Dragging Canoe— angry over the tribe's appeasement of European settlers— split off to form what became known as the Chickamauga faction, which was concentrated around what is now Chattanooga. The next year, the Chickamauga, aligned with British loyalists, attacked Fort Watauga. The warnings of Dragging Canoe's cousin Nancy Ward spared many settlers' lives from the initial attacks. In spite of Dragging Canoe's protests, the Cherokee were continuously induced to sign away most of the tribe's lands to the U.S. government.

During the American Revolution, the Wataugans supplied 240 militiamen (led by John Sevier) to the frontier force known as the Overmountain Men, which defeated British loyalists at the Battle of Kings Mountain in 1780. Tennessee's first attempt at statehood was the State of Franklin, formed in 1784 from three Washington District counties. Its capital was initially at Jonesborough and later Greeneville, and eventually grew to include eight counties. After several unsuccessful attempts at statehood, the State of Franklin rejoined North Carolina in 1788. North Carolina ceded the region to the federal government, which designated it as the Southwest Territory on May 26, 1790. William Blount was appointed as the territorial governor by President George Washington, and Blount and James White established Knoxville as the territory's capital in 1791. The Southwest Territory recorded a population of 35,691 in the first United States census that year, about three-fourths of whom resided in what is now East Tennessee.

In addition to the English and Scotch-Irish settlers, there were also Welsh families who settled in East Tennessee in the late 18th and early 19th centuries. A larger group of settlers, entirely of English descent, arrived from Virginia's Middle Peninsula. They arrived as a result of large landowners buying up land and expanding in such a way that smaller landholders had to leave the area to prosper.

=== Antebellum period ===
During the late 18th and early 19th centuries, a series of land cessions were negotiated with the Cherokees as settlers pushed south of the Washington District. The 1791 Treaty of Holston, negotiated by William Blount, established terms of relations between the United States and the Cherokees. The First Treaty of Tellico established the boundaries of the Treaty of Holston, and a series of treaties over the next two decades ceded small amounts of Cherokee lands to the U.S. government. In the Calhoun Treaty of 1819, the U.S. government purchased Cherokee lands between the Little Tennessee and Hiwassee Rivers. In anticipation of forced removal of the Cherokees, white settlers began moving into Cherokee lands in southeast Tennessee in the 1820s and 1830s.

East Tennessee was home to one of the nation's first abolitionist movements, which arose in the early 19th century. Quakers, who had migrated to the region from Pennsylvania in the 1790s, formed the Manumission Society of Tennessee in 1814. Notable supporters included Presbyterian clergyman Samuel Doak, Tusculum College cofounder Hezekiah Balch, and Maryville College president Isaac Anderson. In 1820, Elihu Embree established The Emancipator— the nation's first exclusively abolitionist newspaper— in Jonesborough. After Embree's death, Benjamin Lundy established the Genius of Universal Emancipation in Greeneville in 1821 to continue Embree's work. By the 1830s, however, the region's abolitionist movement had declined in the face of fierce opposition. The geography of East Tennessee, unlike parts of Middle and West Tennessee, did not allow for large plantation complexes, and as a result, slavery remained relatively uncommon in the region.

In the 1820s, the Cherokees established a government modeled on the U.S. Constitution, and located their capitol at New Echota in northern Georgia. In response to restrictive laws passed by the Georgia legislature, the Cherokees in 1832 moved their capital to the Red Clay Council Grounds in what is now Bradley County, a short distance north of the border with Georgia. A total of eleven general councils were held at the site between 1832 and 1838, during which the Cherokees rejected multiple compromises to surrender their lands east of the Mississippi River and move west. The 1835 Treaty of New Echota which was not approved by the National Council at Red Clay, stipulated that the Cherokee relocate to Indian Territory in present-day Oklahoma, and provided a grace period until May 1838 for them to voluntarily migrate. In 1838 and 1839, U.S. troops forcibly removed nearly 17,000 Cherokees and about 2,000 Black people the Cherokees enslaved from their homes in southeastern Tennessee to Indian Territory. An estimated 4,000 died along the way. The operation was orchestrated from Fort Cass in Charleston, which was constructed on the site of the Indian agency. In the Cherokee language, the event is called Nunna daul Isunyi, meaning "the Trail Where We Cried", and it is commonly known as the Trail of Tears.

The arrival of the railroad in the 1850s brought immediate economic benefits to East Tennessee, primarily to Chattanooga, which had been founded in 1839. Chattanooga quickly developed into a nexus between the mountain communities of Southern Appalachia and the cotton states of the Deep South, being referred to as the Gateway to the Deep South. In 1843, copper was discovered in the Copper Basin in the extreme southeast corner of the state, and by the 1850s, large industrial-scale mining operations were taking place, making the Copper Basin one of the most productive copper mining districts in the nation.

=== Civil War ===
Map showing the June 1861 Ordinance of Secession vote in East Tennessee by county. No data could be found for Cumberland and Union counties.

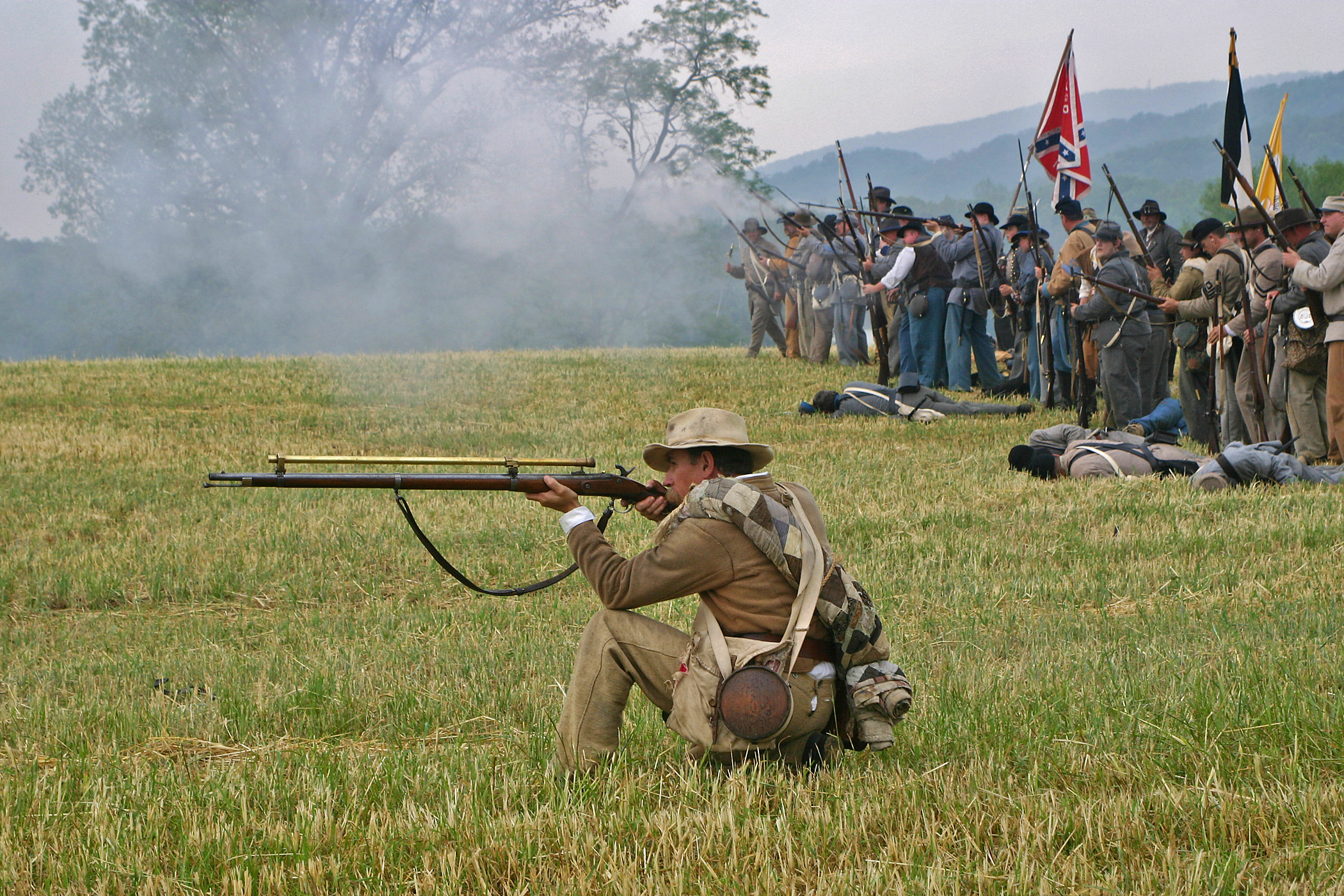
A reenactment of the Civil War's Battle of Bean's Station in Bean Station

The American Civil War sentiments of East Tennesseans were among the most complex of any region in the nation. Because of the rarity of slavery in the region, many East Tennesseans were suspicious of the aristocratic Southern planter class that dominated the Southern Democratic Party and most Southern state legislatures. For this reason, Whig support ran high in East Tennessee in the years leading up to the war, especially in Knox and surrounding counties. In 1860, slaves composed about 9% of East Tennessee's population, compared to 25% statewide. When Tennessee voted on a referendum calling for secession in February 1861, which failed, more than 80% of East Tennesseans voted against it, including majorities in every county except Sullivan and Meigs. In June 1861, nearly 70% of East Tennesseans voted against the state's second ordinance of secession which succeeded statewide. Along with Sullivan and Meigs, however, there were pro-secession majorities in Monroe, Rhea, Sequatchie, and Polk counties. There were also pro-secession majorities within the cities of Knoxville and Chattanooga, although these cities' respective counties voted decisively against secession. According to historical data, East Tennessee provided approximately 48,800 soldiers to the Confederate military, including both those who willingly enlisted and were conscripted, and 30,400 to the Union Army, most of whom fled to Union held areas to enlist like the border state of Kentucky.

In June 1861, the Unionist East Tennessee Convention met in Greeneville, where it drafted a petition to the Tennessee General Assembly demanding that East Tennessee be allowed to form a separate Union-aligned state split off from the rest of Tennessee, similar to West Virginia. The legislature rejected the petition, however, and Tennessee Governor Isham Harris ordered Confederate troops to occupy East Tennessee. In the fall of 1861, Unionist guerrillas burned bridges and attacked Confederate sympathizers throughout the region, leading the Confederacy to invoke martial law in parts of East Tennessee. Senator Andrew Johnson and Congressman Horace Maynard—who in spite of being from a Confederate state retained their seats in Congress—continuously pressed President Abraham Lincoln to send troops into East Tennessee, and Lincoln subsequently made the liberation of East Tennessee a top priority. Knoxville Whig editor William "Parson" Brownlow, who had been one of slavery's most outspoken defenders, attacked secessionism with equal fervor and embarked on a speaking tour of the Northern states to rally support for East Tennessee. In 1862, Lincoln appointed Johnson, a War Democrat, as military governor of Tennessee.

Several crucial Civil War military campaigns took place in East Tennessee, although the region did not see any large-scale fighting until the second half of the war, unlike the rest of the state. After being defeated at the Battle of Chickamauga in northwest Georgia in September 1863, Union troops of the Army of the Cumberland under the command of William Rosecrans fled to Chattanooga. Confederate troops under Braxton Bragg attempted to besiege the Union troops into surrendering, but two months later, reinforcements from the Army of the Tennessee under the command of Ulysses S. Grant, William Tecumseh Sherman, Joseph Hooker, and George Henry Thomas arrived. Under the command of Hooker, the Union troops defeated the Confederates at the Battle of Lookout Mountain on November 24, and the following day Grant and Thomas completely ran the Confederates out of the city at the Battle of Missionary Ridge. These battles came to be known as the Chattanooga campaign and marked a major turning point in the war, allowing Sherman to launch the Atlanta campaign from the city in the spring of 1864. A few days after the Chattanooga campaign concluded, Confederate General James Longstreet launched the Knoxville campaign in an effort to take control of the city. The campaign ended in a Union victory at the Battle of Fort Sanders on November 29, which was under the command of Union General Ambrose Burnside, although Longstreet defeated Union troops under the command of James M. Shackelford at the Battle of Bean's Station two weeks later. By the beginning of 1864, East Tennessee was largely under the control of the Union Army. Despite its Unionist leanings, however, it was the last part of the state to fall to the Union.

=== Reconstruction and the Progressive Era ===
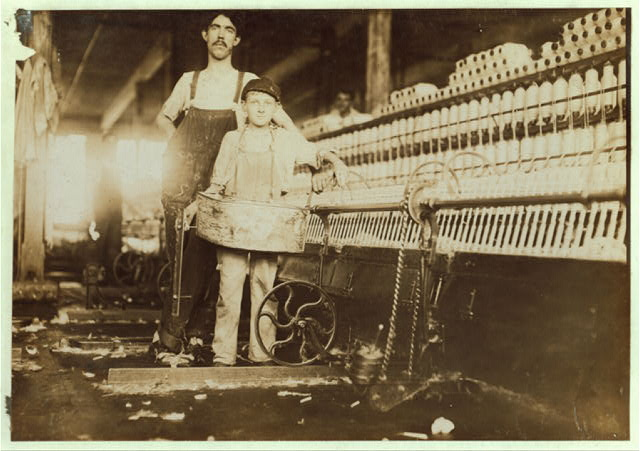
Millworkers in Chattanooga, photographed by Lewis Hine in 1910

After the Civil War, Northern capitalists began investing heavily in East Tennessee, which helped the region's ravaged economy recover much faster than most of the South. Most new industry in Tennessee was constructed in East Tennessee during this time, and Chattanooga became one of the first industrialized cities in the South. Knoxville also experienced a modest manufacturing boom, and new factories were constructed in other small towns such as Kingsport, Johnson City, Cleveland, Morristown, and Maryville, making them amongst the first Southern cities to experience the results of the Industrial Revolution in the United States. Other cities in the region, such as Lenoir City, Harriman, Rockwood, Dayton, and Englewood, were founded as company towns during this period. The Burra Burra Mine—established in the 1890s in the Copper Basin—was at its height one of the nation's copper mining operations.

In 1899, the world's first Coca-Cola bottling plant was built in Chattanooga. In the early 1900s, railroad and sawmill innovations allowed logging firms such as the Little River Lumber Company and Babock Lumber to harvest the virgin forests of the Great Smokies and adjacent ranges. Coal mining operations were established in coal-rich areas of the Cumberland Plateau and Cumberland Mountains, namely in Scott County, northern Campbell County, and western Anderson County. In the early 1890s, Tennessee's controversial convict lease system sparked a miners' uprising in Anderson County that became known as the Coal Creek War. While the uprising was eventually crushed, it induced the state to do away with convict leasing, making Tennessee the first southern state to end the controversial practice.

Other ambitious ventures during the period included the construction of Ocoee Dam No. 1 and Hales Bar Dam (completed in 1911 and 1913 respectively) by the forerunners of the Tennessee Electric Power Company (TEPCO). In the 1920s, Tennessee Eastman—destined to become the state's largest employer—was established in Kingsport, and in nearby Elizabethton the German-owned Bemberg Corporation built two large rayon mills. Equally ambitious was the Aluminum Company of America's establishment of a massive aluminum smelting operation at what is now Alcoa in 1914, which required the construction of a large plant and company town and the building of a series of dams along the Little Tennessee River to supply the plant with hydroelectric power.

In the late 19th to early 20th century, leisure resorts oriented on mineral springs flourished in the region, with the most popular being Tate Springs in Grainger County, which attracted many prestigious families of the era, including the Ford, Rockefeller, Firestone, Studebaker, and Mellon families. The region received international attention in the public execution of a circus elephant via hanging. After killing its trainer in a circus performance in Kingsport, the elephant was transported to Erwin in nearby Unicoi County and hanged in front of a crowd of roughly 2,500 residents. A picture of the undertaking was widely distributed by American pulp magazine Argosy.

In the 1920s, East Tennessee surpassed Middle Tennessee as the state's most populous Grand Division, primarily as a result of the larger African American population in that region fleeing to Northern industrial cities as part of the Great Migration.

=== Great Depression, TVA, and World War II ===
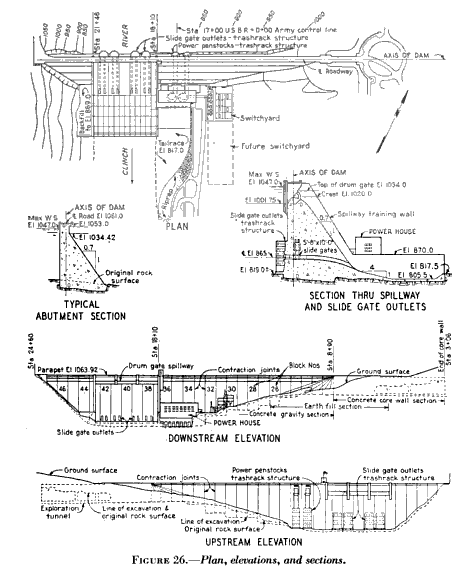
Engineering plans for Norris Dam in Anderson County, the first project completed by the Tennessee Valley Authority in 1936

Over a period of two decades, the Tennessee Valley Authority (TVA), created in 1933 at the height of the Great Depression, drastically altered the economic, cultural, and physical landscape of East Tennessee. TVA sought to build a series of dams across the Tennessee River watershed to control flooding, bring cheap electricity to East Tennessee, and connect Knoxville and Chattanooga to the nation's inland waterways by creating a continuously navigable channel along the entirety of the Tennessee River. Starting with Norris Dam in 1933, the agency built 10 dams in East Tennessee (and five more across the border in North Carolina and Georgia) over a period of two decades. Melton Hill and Nickajack were added in the 1960s, and the last, Tellico Dam, was completed in 1979 after a contentious five-year legal battle with environmentalists. TVA also gained control of TEPCO's assets after a legal struggle in the 1930s with TEPCO president Jo Conn Guild and attorney Wendell Willkie that was eventually dismissed by the U.S. Supreme Court.

TVA's construction of hydroelectric dams in East Tennessee would receive criticism with for what some have perceived as excessive use of its authority of eminent domain and an unwillingness to compromise with landowners. All of TVA's hydroelectric projects in East Tennessee were made possible through the use of eminent domain and required the removal of 125,000 Tennessee Valley residents. Residents who refused to sell to the TVA were often forced by court orders and lawsuits. Several dam projects inundated historic Native American sites and American Revolution-era towns. On some occasions, land that TVA had acquired through eminent domain that was expected to be inundated was not and was sold to private developers for the construction of planned communities such as Tellico Village in Loudon County.

East Tennessee's physiographic layout and rural nature made it the ideal location for the uranium enrichment facilities of the Manhattan Project, the U.S. federal government's top secret World War II-era initiative to build the first atomic bomb. Starting in 1942, the U.S. Army Corps of Engineers built what is now the city of Oak Ridge, and the following year work began on the enrichment facilities, K-25 and Y-12. During the same period, Tennessee Eastman built the Holston Ordnance Works in Kingsport for the manufacture of an explosive known as Composition B, and the Department of Defense constructed the Volunteer Ordnance Works in Chattanooga to produce TNT. The ALCOA corporation, seeking to meet the wartime demand for aluminum (which was needed for aircraft construction), built its North Plant, which at the time of its completion was the world's largest plant under a single roof. To meet the region's skyrocketing demand for electricity, TVA hastened its dam construction, completing Cherokee and Douglas dams in record time and building the massive Fontana Dam just across the state line in North Carolina.

=== Mid-20th century to present ===
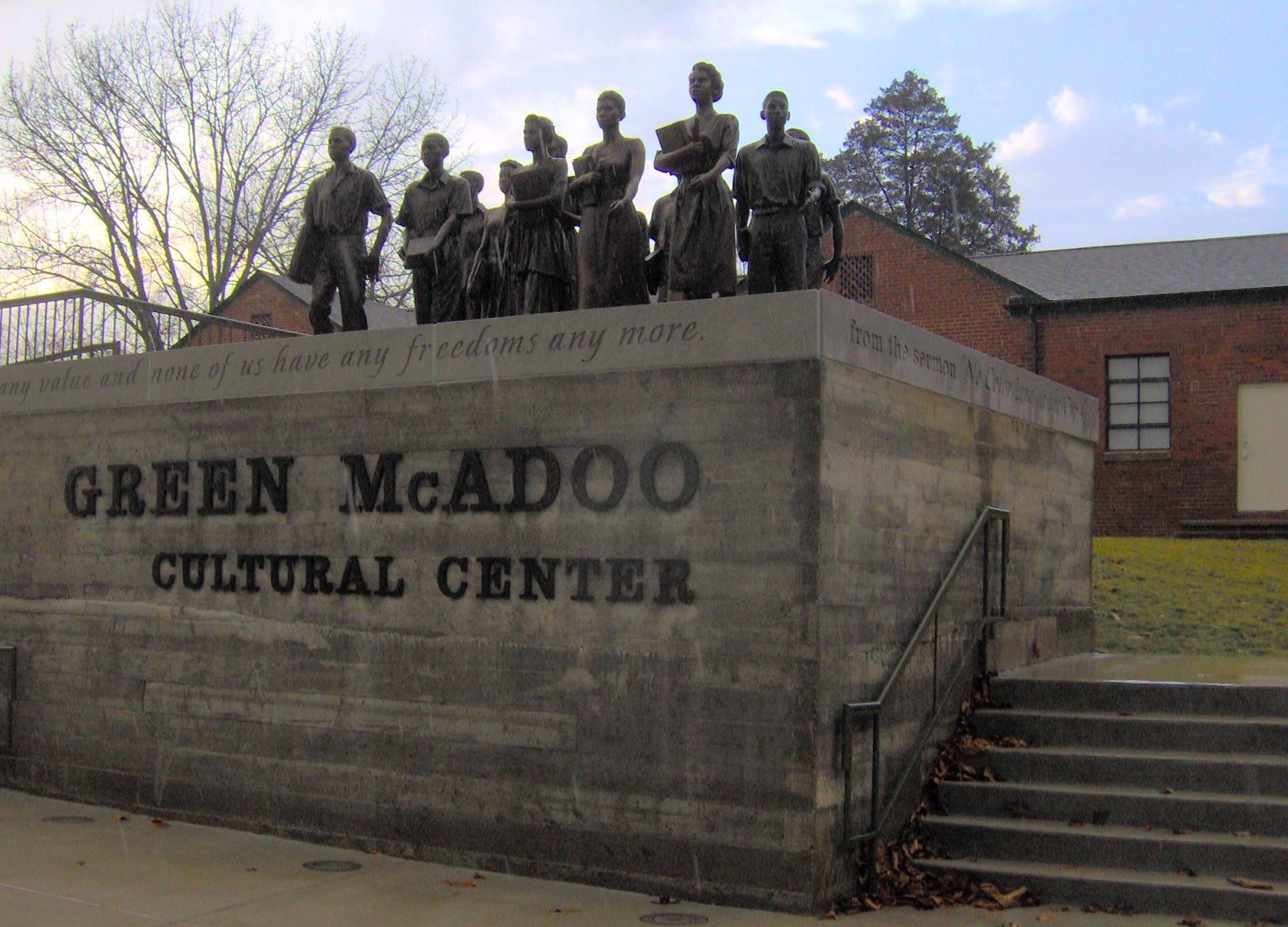
A monument to 12 African American students who integrated Clinton High School in 1956

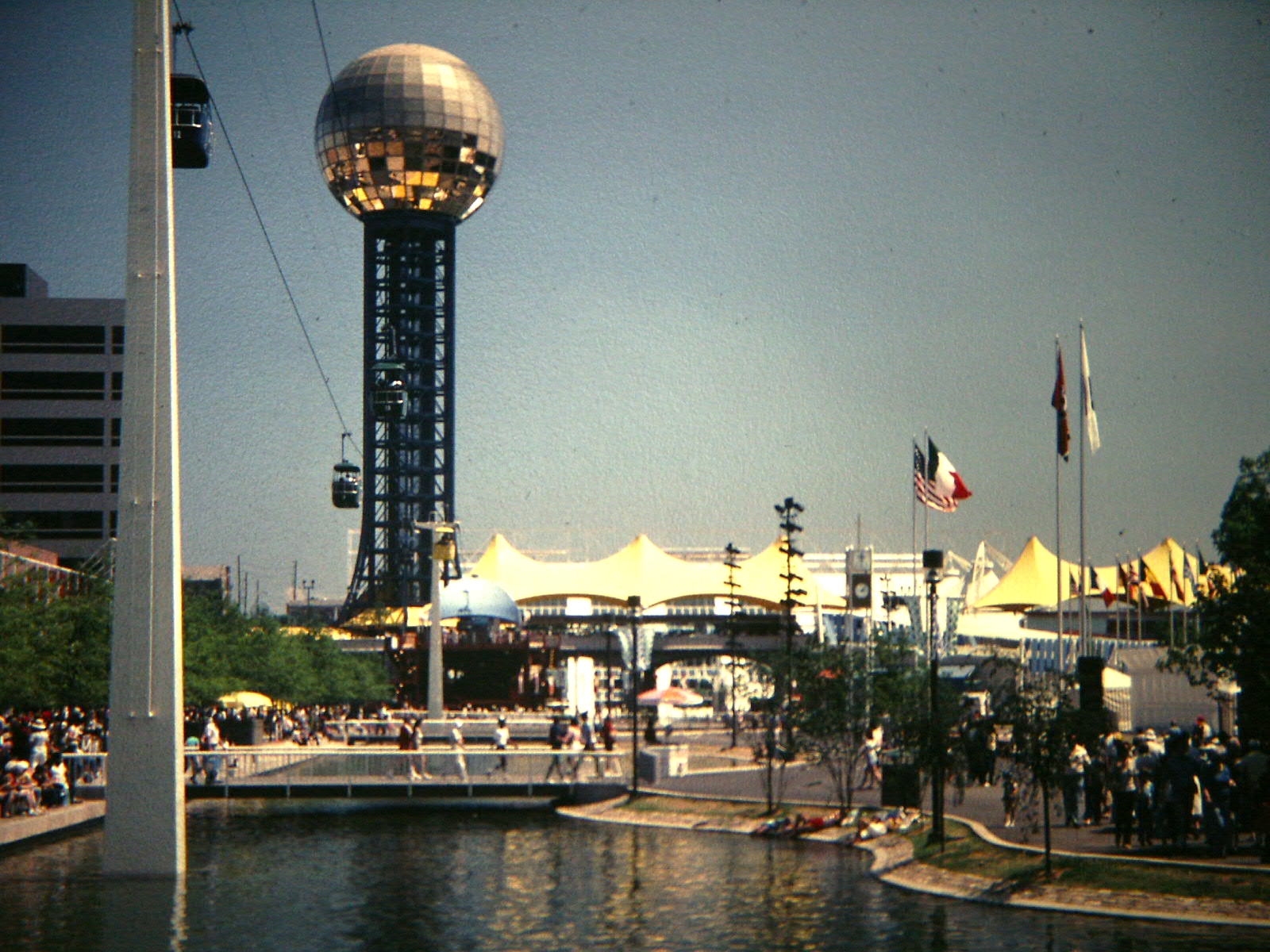
The 1982 World's Fair was held in Knoxville

In 1955, Oak Ridge High School became the first public school in Tennessee to be integrated. This occurred one year after the U.S. Supreme Court ruled racial segregation in public schools to be unconstitutional in Brown v. Board of Education. In 1956, judge Robert Love Taylor ordered nearby Clinton High School to be integrated, and a crisis developed when pro-segregationists threatened violence, prompting Governor Frank G. Clement to send Tennessee National Guard troops to assist with the integration process.

Throughout the 1950s and 1960s, federal investments into urbanized areas provided major cities of the East Tennessee region to establish urban renewal initiatives, often involving the demolition or redevelopment of blighted commercial areas or neighborhoods for new public buildings and freeways. These projects would often involve the controversial removal and redlining of poverty-stricken and minority households.

In 1965, Congress created the Appalachian Regional Commission (ARC) to improve economic development and job opportunities in the Appalachian region. The program resulted in the construction of new and improved highways in East Tennessee through the Appalachian Development Highway System and brought new industries to rural, impoverished counties in the region that had previously been dependent on declining sectors such as coal mining and logging. With the investment of the ARC, several cities emerged as industrial hubs of the East Tennessee region, including Cleveland, Kingsport, Knoxville, and Morristown. Beginning around this time, East Tennessee, along with the rest of the state, began to benefit from the nationwide Sun Belt phenomenon, which brought additional economic growth to the region. The region saw its most rapid growth in the 1970s. Chattanooga, however, began to decline in the 1960s and was declared by the Federal government to be the most polluted city in the country in 1969. In the mid-1980s, the city leaders launched a program called "Vision 2000" which worked to revitalize and reinvent the city's economy and eventually resulted in a reversal of Chattanooga's decline.

TVA's construction of the Tellico Dam in Loudon County became the subject of national controversy in the 1970s when the endangered snail darter fish was reported to be affected by the project. After lawsuits by environmental groups, the debate was decided by the U.S. Supreme Court case Tennessee Valley Authority v. Hill in 1978, leading to amendments of the Endangered Species Act.

In 1982, a World's Fair was held in Knoxville. The fair was also known as the "Knoxville International Energy Exposition," and its theme was "Energy Turns the World." The fair attracted more than 11 million visitors during its six-month run and is the most recent world's fair to have been held in the United States. In 1996, the whitewater slalom events of the Atlanta Summer Olympic Games were held on the Ocoee River in Polk County. These are the only Olympic sporting events to have ever been held in Tennessee.

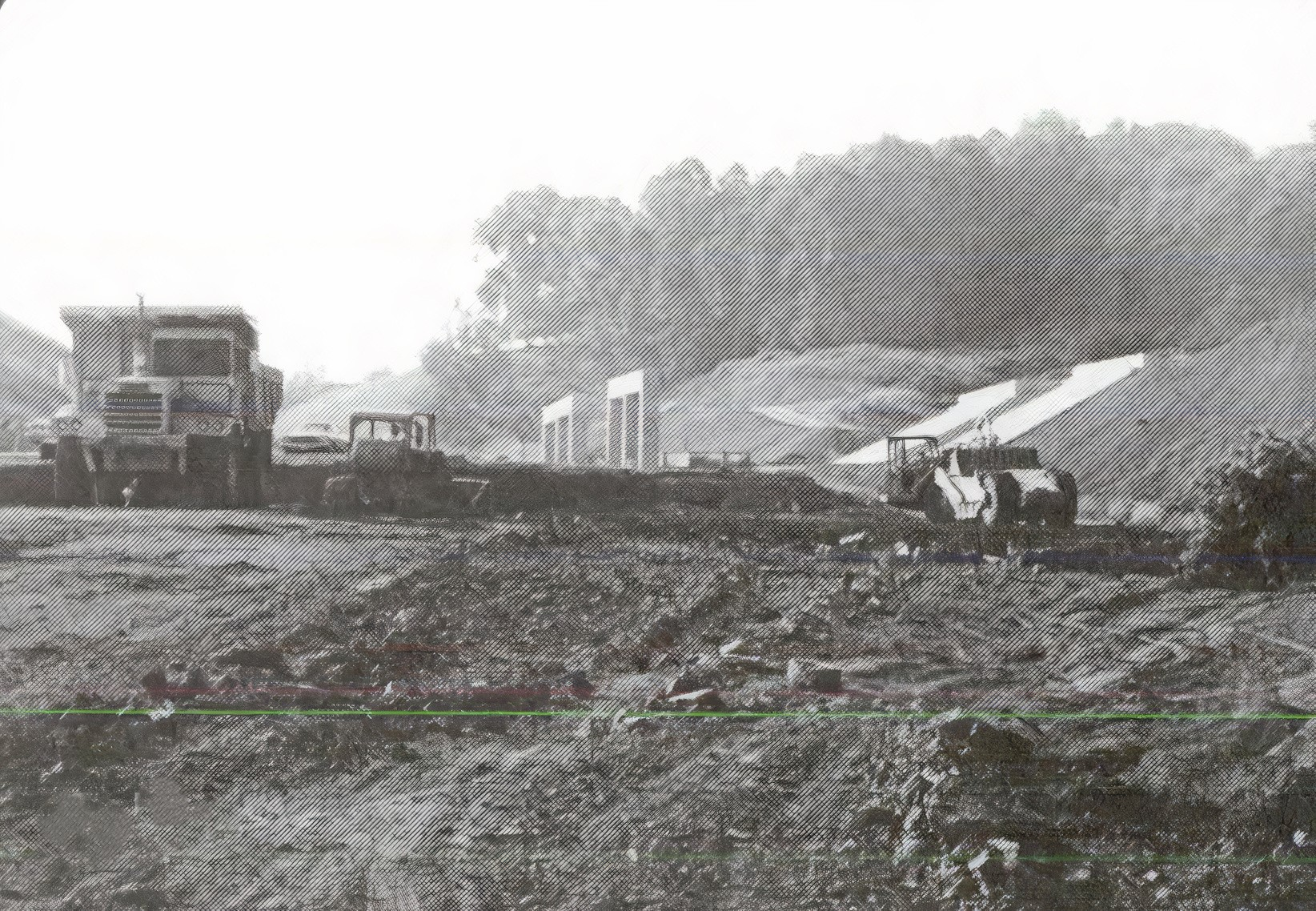
Highway construction of U.S. Route 25E, part of the Appalachian Development Highway System plan, in Morristown, 1976.

Several high profile disasters have occurred in East Tennessee since the latter 20th century. On May 13, 1972, the deadliest motor vehicle accident in state history occurred near Bean Station on U.S. Route 11W when a tractor-trailer and a Greyhound bus collided head-on, killing 14 and injuring 15. The accident prompted the rapid construction of additional four-lane arterial highways in the East Tennessee region throughout the 1970s and early 1980s, as well as placed a focus on the completion of Interstates 40, 75, and 81, which occurred in the mid-1970s. On December 11, 1990, a 99-vehicle collision occurred in dense fog on Interstate 75 near Calhoun, killing 12 and injuring 42, and was reportedly the largest motor vehicle accident in U.S. history at the time, in terms of the number of vehicles. On December 23, 2008, the largest industrial waste spill in United States history occurred at TVA's Kingston Fossil Plant when a dike failed, releasing more than 1.1 billion gallons of coal ash slurry into the Emory and Clinch Rivers. The cleanup cost TVA more than $1 billion and was completed in 2015. On September 27, 2024, Hurricane Helene caused catastrophic flooding in the northeastern part of the state, particularly in Unicoi, Washington, Carter, Johnson, Greene, and Cocke counties.

== Music ==
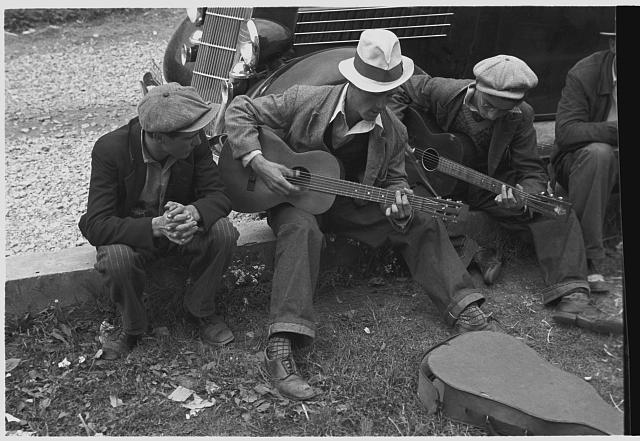
Musicians performing on the streets of Maynardville, c. 1935

Appalachian music has evolved from a blend of English and Scottish ballads, Irish and Scottish fiddle tunes, African-American blues, and religious music. In 1916 and 1917, British folklorist Cecil Sharp visited Flag Pond, Sevierville, Harrogate, and other rural areas in the region where he transcribed dozens of examples of "Old World" ballads that had been passed down generation to generation from the region's early English settlers. Uncle Am Stuart, Charlie Bowman, Clarence Ashley, G. B. Grayson, and Theron Hale were among the most successful early musicians from East Tennessee.

In 1927, the Victor Talking Machine Company conducted a series of recording sessions in Bristol that saw the rise of musicians such as Jimmie Rodgers and the Carter Family. Subsequent recording sessions, such as the Johnson City sessions in 1928 and the Knoxville St. James Sessions in 1930 proved lucrative, but by the late 1930s, the success of the Grand Ole Opry had lured much of the region's talent to Nashville. In the 1940s, the Grand Ole Opry and associated music labels began using "country" instead of "hillbilly" for their genre, hoping to attract a wider audience.

Union County would prove influential to later developments in country music with musicians Roy Acuff, Chet Atkins, and Carl Smith who were born in the county assisted with the international breakthrough of the genre, and the development of the Nashville sound and rockabilly.

== In popular culture ==
East Tennessee culture has been represented in several songs, television shows, and films. The Ford Show, which ran on NBC from 1956 until 1961, was hosted by Tennessee Ernie Ford from Bristol. Christy, a 1990s CBS television series, was based on village life in 1910s East Tennessee. The show, which was later developed into a television movie series, featured traditional mountain music. "ChristyFest", held each summer, is dedicated to the novel, musical, TV series, and movies, and includes live folk music. The television film Dolly Parton's Coat of Many Colors aired on NBC in 2015. The film was inspired by her 1971 song and album of the same name, and recounts her childhood in the mountains of East Tennessee. The film was generally praised by critics, and received the Tex Ritter Award from the Academy of Country Music.

The folk hero Daniel Boone, who helped explore East Tennessee, was honored in the soundtrack for the television series Daniel Boone, which ran from 1964 until 1970. The last of three versions of the theme song was sung by The Imperials, a Grammy-winning Christian music group. The Ballad of Davy Crockett helped to popularize the 1955 film Davy Crockett, King of the Wild Frontier. First recorded and introduced on the television series Disneyland in 1954, it has been covered by a number of artists, most notably Tennessee Ernie Ford. The song's lyrics say Davy Crockett was "born on a mountaintop in Tennessee", but his actual birthplace was in Limestone, Tennessee, the location of Davy Crockett Birthplace State Park. In addition to his renowned frontier exploits and military service, Crockett served Tennessee as a state legislator and Congressman.

== Economy ==
Throughout the 19th and early 20th centuries, East Tennessee's economy relied heavily on subsistence agriculture. Agriculture still plays a vital role in Tennessee's economy. In the cities, however, manufacturing was the main source of prosperity and growth. In the years following the Civil War, Chattanooga became one of the first industrial cities in the South. Other cities in East Tennessee such as Knoxville, Kingsport, Cleveland, Maryville, and Morristown were among some of the first cities in Tennessee to experience the effects of the Industrial revolution in the United States, and most manufacturing facilities constructed in the state in the latter 19th century located in East Tennessee. The region's economy remained predominantly agrarian during this time, however. In the region's agricultural industry, burley tobacco served as the region's cash crop until the late 1990s and early 2000s, when the demand for burley declined due to changes in societal attitudes and governmental policy towards tobacco usage.

=== Business and industry ===
Major companies and businesses headquartered in East Tennessee include Pilot Flying J, the Baptist Hospital system, Regal Cinemas in Knoxville, and BlueCross BlueShield of Tennessee, U.S. Xpress, Covenant Transport, and Unum in Chattanooga, and Eastman Chemical in Kingsport.

A variety of goods are manufactured in East Tennessee, including chemicals, foods and drinks, automotive components, and electronics. The largest manufacturer in the region is Eastman Chemical in Kingsport, with more than 10,000 employees, and other chemical companies operate several other chemical manufacturing facilities in the region. Volkswagen operates an assembly plant in Chattanooga, and several automotive parts manufacturers, including Denso, operate plants in East Tennessee. Coca-Cola was first produced in Chattanooga in 1899, and many well-known food and drink brands originated and are made in East Tennessee, including Mayfield Dairy products, Moon Pie, Little Debbie, Mountain Dew, Bush's Beans, and M&M's. The region has emerged in recent years as one of the top locations for the legal production of moonshine. East Tennessee is a top location where boats are manufactured, with companies such as Sea Ray, MasterCraft, and Malibu Boats, operating facilities in the region. Other important products produced in East Tennessee include consumer electronics, electrical equipment, and fabricated metal products.

Oak Ridge National Laboratory (ORNL) and Y-12 National Security Complex in Oak Ridge are two of the largest employers in East Tennessee. ORNL conducts scientific research in materials science, nuclear physics, energy, high-performance computing, systems biology, and national security, and is also the largest national laboratory in the Department of Energy (DOE) system by size, and has the third highest budget. Both ORNL and Y-12 also support many jobs through contracting firms in the area. Since the 1990s, the geographical area between Oak Ridge and Knoxville has been known as the Tennessee Technology Corridor, with more than 500 high-tech firms located in the region. With the expanded smart grid in Chattanooga, and the fastest internet in the Western Hemisphere, Chattanooga has begun to grow its technical and financial sectors with its burgeoning start-up scene.

The town of Erwin, located in the Tri-Cities area, is home to Nuclear Fuel Services, which operates a manufacturing and uranium enrichment facility converting Cold War-era weapons uranium into commercially usable reactor fuel for power plants around the United States, and is the largest supplier of uranium fuel for the United States Navy since 1960.

=== Energy ===
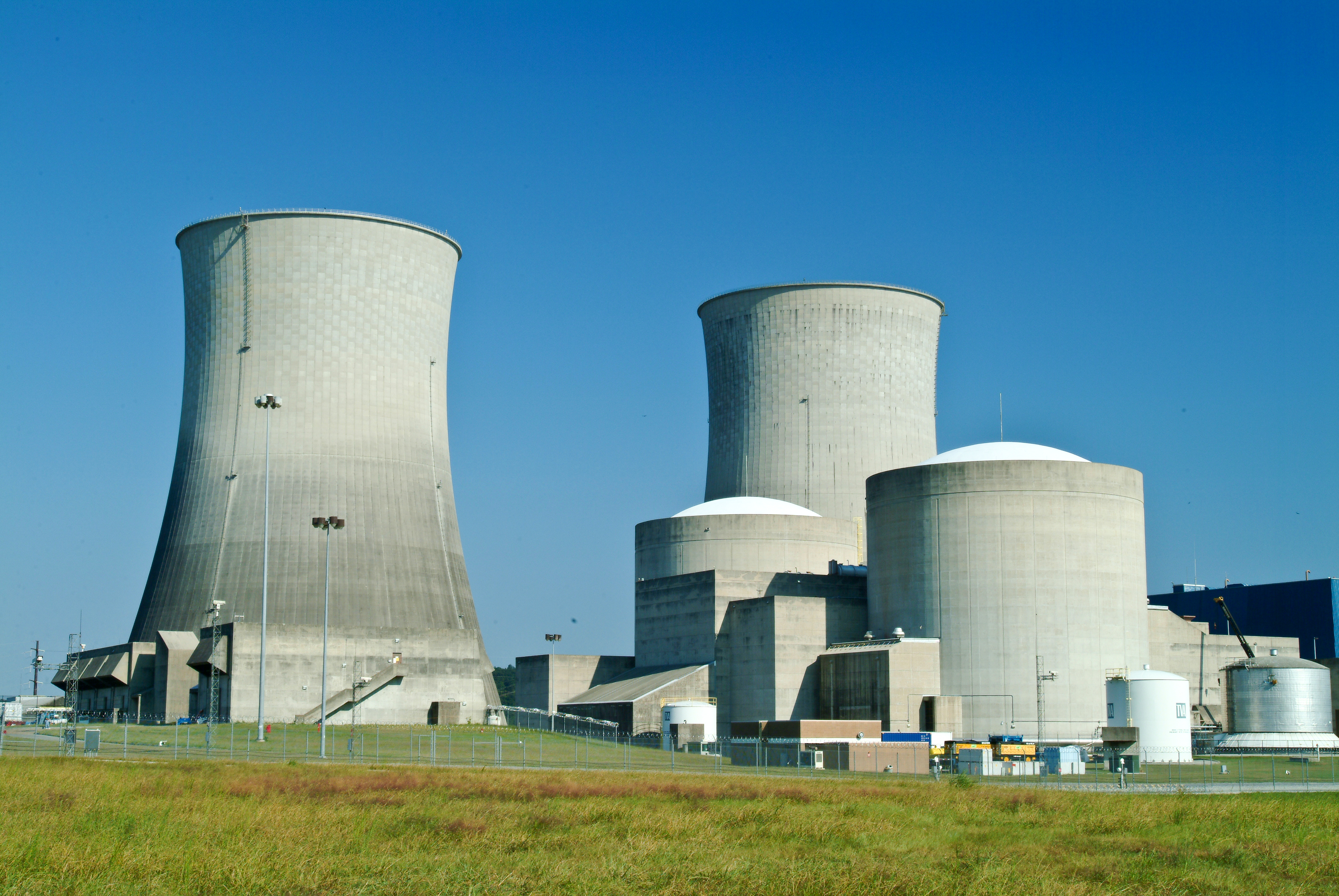
Watts Bar Nuclear Plant in Rhea County is home to two of the newest operating nuclear reactors in the United States.

The Tennessee Valley Authority (TVA) has its administrative operations headquartered in Knoxville and power operations headquartered in Chattanooga, and provides nearly all of East Tennessee's electricity. TVA operates the Sequoyah and Watts Bar nuclear plants in Soddy-Daisy and Rhea County, respectively, the Kingston Fossil Plant, a coal-fired plant, the John Sevier combined cycle natural gas-fired plant near Rogersville, the Raccoon Mountain Pumped-Storage Plant near Chattanooga, a wind-powered facility near Oak Ridge, and several hydroelectric dams in East Tennessee.

Two of the newest civilian nuclear power reactors in the United States are located at the Watts Bar Nuclear Plant. Unit 1 began operation in 1996 and Unit 2 started operating in 2016, making it the first new nuclear power reactor to begin operation in the United States in the 21st century. Officials at Oak Ridge National Laboratory and the TVA are studying advancements in nuclear power as an energy source in a joint effort, including small modular reactors.

=== Mining ===
The Ridge-and-Valley region of East Tennessee is home to several of the largest deposits of zinc in the United States, including the Mossy Creek deposits in Jefferson County and the Grainger and Hancock counties' deposits, respectively.

Tennessee marble, a rare crystalline form of limestone, is found only in several deposits in the East Tennessee region in the entire world. Its strong resemblance to true marble when polished has made it a popular construction material found in several structures and monuments around the United States. The stone occurs in belts of Ordovician-period rocks known as the Holston Formation, Tennessee marble achieved such popularity in the late-19th century that Knoxville, the stone's primary finishing and distribution center, became known as "The Marble City."

=== Tourism ===
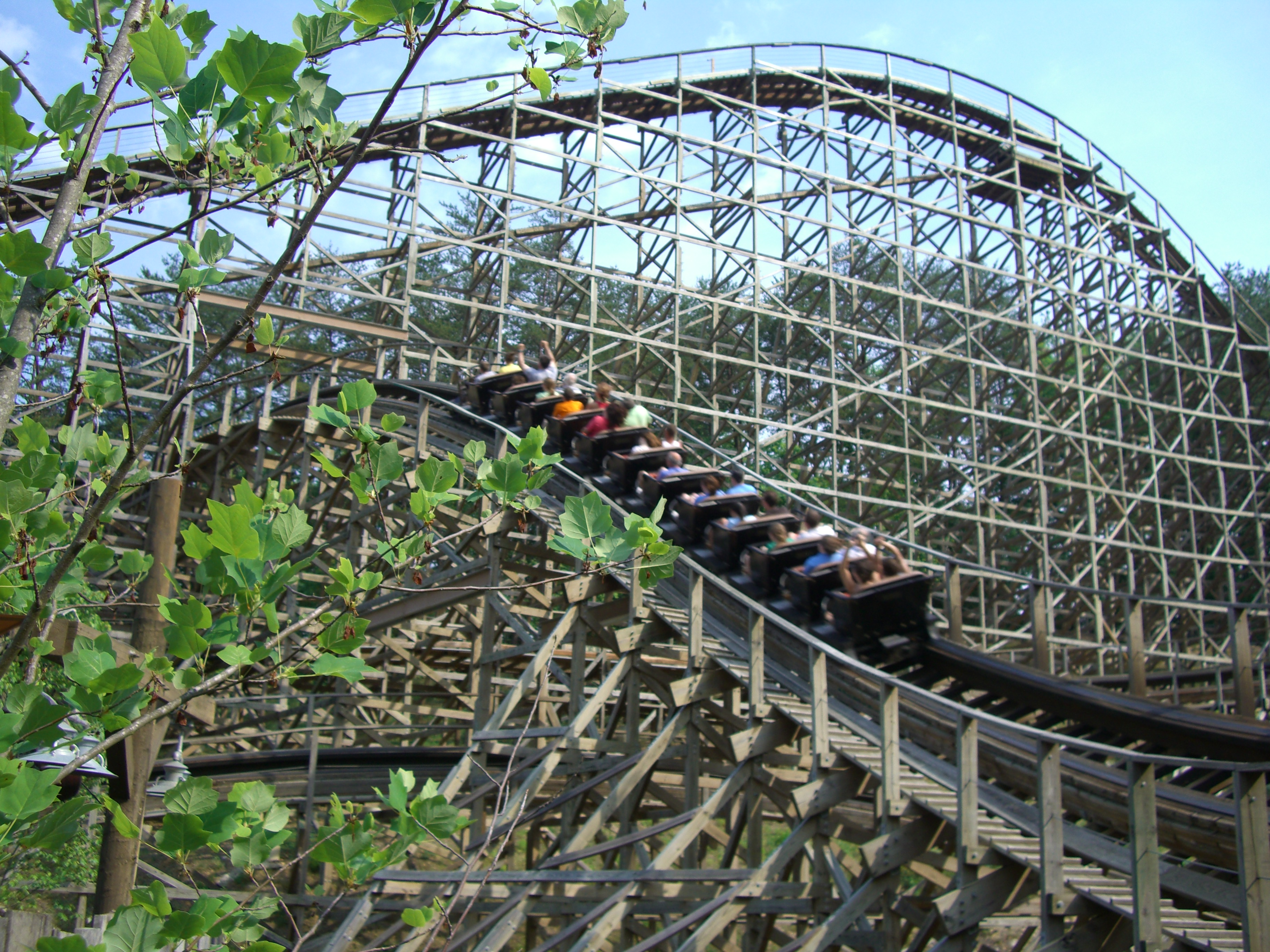
Riders aboard the roller coaster Thunderhead at Dollywood, one of the nation's most popular theme parks.

While the mountain springs of East Tennessee and the cooler upper elevations of its mountainous areas have long provided a retreat from the region's summertime heat, much of East Tennessee's tourism industry is a result of land conservation movements in the 1920s and 1930s. The Great Smoky Mountains National Park, established in 1934, led to a tourism boom in Sevier and Blount counties, effectively converting the tiny mountain hamlets of Gatlinburg and Pigeon Forge into resort towns. Great Smoky Mountains National Park is the most visited national park in the United States, receiving more than 14 million visitors annually. The park also anchors a massive tourism industry in nearby Gatlinburg, Pigeon Forge, and Sevierville, which is the third largest in the state. Attractions include Dollywood (the most visited ticketed attraction in Tennessee), Ober Gatlinburg, and Ripley's Aquarium of the Smokies.

Other tourist attractions maintained by the National Park Service are Big South Fork National River and Recreation Area and Cumberland Gap National Historical Park, both in the Cumberland Mountains, Chickamauga and Chattanooga National Military Park, Overmountain Victory National Historic Trail, Trail of Tears National Historic Trail, and the Manhattan Project National Historical Park. East Tennessee is home to several scenic roadways including the Foothills Parkway, the East Tennessee Crossing Byway, the Norris Freeway, Cumberland National Scenic Byway, the Tail of the Dragon, the Cherohala Skyway, and the Ocoee Scenic Byway.

The Appalachian Trail, one of the world's most well-known hiking trails, was built in the mid-1930s and passes along the Tennessee-North Carolina border. The Cherokee National Forest was established during the same period and preserves most of the Blue Ridge Mountains in Tennessee that are not part of the Great Smoky Mountains National Park. The Ocoee River in Polk County attracts thousands of whitewater rafters each year and is the most rafted river in the nation. The nearby gentler Hiwassee River is also a top attraction in East Tennessee. Reservoirs created in the aftermath of the TVA's hydroelectric projects in the upper East Tennessee region, including Cherokee, Douglas, Fort Loudoun, and Norris provide recreational opportunities on and along the shores via water sports, boating, fishing, and "second-home" development.

Attractions in Chattanooga include the Tennessee Aquarium, the nation's largest freshwater aquarium, and Rock City, and Ruby Falls on Lookout Mountain, the latter two of which are perhaps best known for their unique advertisements painted on barn roofs across the southeast. The Tennessee Aquarium coincided with the revitalization of Chattanooga's riverfront, which helped to bolster the downtown districts. The city has become an outdoor sports mecca, being heralded as the "Best Town Ever" by Outside magazine.

== Transportation ==
=== Roads ===
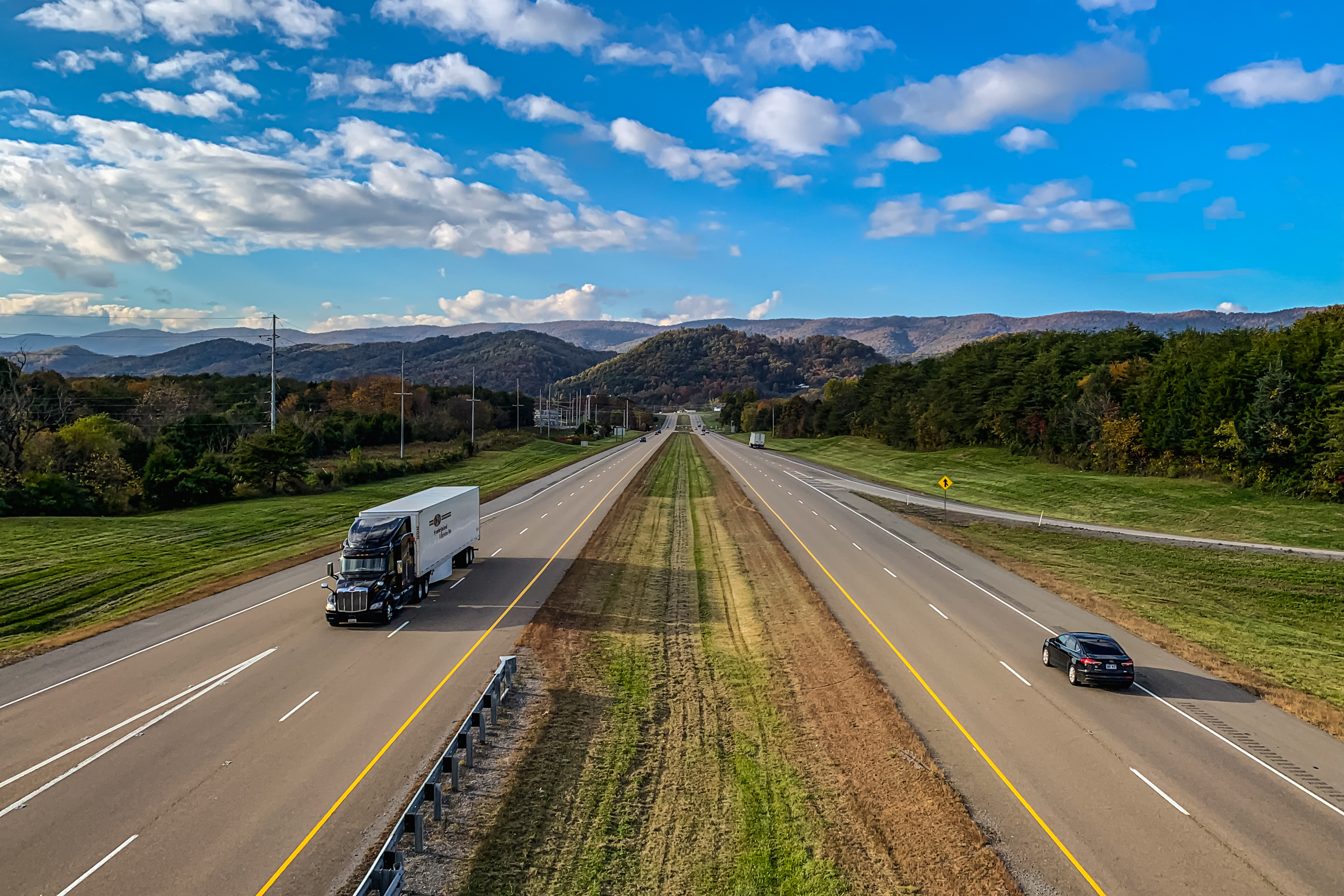
U.S. Route 25E serves as both Corridor S of the Appalachian Development Highway System and the East Tennessee Crossing Byway.

Interstate 75 (I-75) enters East Tennessee in Chattanooga, runs northeast to Knoxville, and then turns north, passing through the Cumberland Mountains into Kentucky. Interstate 40 (I-40) traverses the region in an east to west alignment, passing through Knoxville. I-40 and I-75 run concurrent for nearly 20 miles (32 km) in Knoxville and carry more than 210,000 vehicles per day at their busiest point, the highest traffic volume in Tennessee. Interstate 81 (I-81) begins about 35 miles (56 km) east of Knoxville, and runs northeast to Bristol. Interstate 26 (I-26), while technically an east–west route, begins in Kingsport, runs south to Johnson City, and enters North Carolina to the south, crossing the Blue Ridge Mountains. Interstate 24 (I-24) terminates in Chattanooga, and connects the region to Nashville. In Knoxville, both I-40 and I-75 each have auxiliary routes: I-140, I-640, and I-275. Several designated corridors of the Appalachian Development Highway System are located in the region, including Corridors B, F, J, K, S, and V, which provide expressway connection to Interstate Highways. Other major surface routes in East Tennessee which are part of the National Highway System (NHS) are U.S. Routes 11E, 11W, 19, 25E, 27, 64, 129, 321, and 411.

=== Air, rail, and water ===
Major airports in East Tennessee include McGhee Tyson Airport (TYS) in Alcoa outside of Knoxville, Chattanooga Metropolitan Airport (CHA), and Tri-Cities Regional Airport (TRI) in Blountville. Several other general aviation airports are located in the region. Norfolk Southern Railway operates rail lines in East Tennessee, include multiple tracks that intersect in Knoxville and Chattanooga. The Tennessee River is the only navigable waterway in East Tennessee via a lock-and-canal system at through several TVA hydroelectric dams.

== Higher education ==
The region's major public universities are the Knoxville and Chattanooga campuses of the University of Tennessee and East Tennessee State University in Johnson City. Private four-year institutions include Bryan College, Carson–Newman University, King University, Lee University, Lincoln Memorial University, Maryville College, Milligan University, Johnson University, Tennessee Wesleyan University, and Tusculum University. Several public community colleges and vocational/technical schools also are located in the region, such as Northeast State Community College in Blountville, Walters State Community College in Morristown, Pellissippi State Community College near Knoxville, Chattanooga State Community College, and Cleveland State Community College. The Tennessee College of Applied Technology has several campuses across the area.

The University of Tennessee's athletic teams, nicknamed the "Volunteers", or "Vols", are the region's most popular sports teams, and constitute a multimillion-dollar industry. The university's football team plays at Neyland Stadium, one of the nation's largest stadiums. Neyland is flanked by the Thompson–Boling Arena, which has broken several attendance records for college men's and women's basketball.

== Legal structure ==
According to the state constitution, no more than two of the Tennessee Supreme Court's five justices can come from any one Grand Division. The Supreme Court rotates meeting in courthouses in each of the three divisions. The Supreme Court building for East Tennessee is in Knoxville. A similar rule applies to certain other commissions and boards as well, to prevent them from showing a geographic and population bias.

== Politics ==
East Tennessee vote by party in presidential elections
Year	GOP	DEM	Others
2024	71.36% 826,055	27.54% 318,800	1.10% 12,721
2020	68.97% 771,076	29.27% 327,192	1.76% 19,671
2016	69.26% 638,260	25.96% 239,241	4.78% 44,086
2012	68.00% 602,623	30.22% 267,804	1.78% 15,760
2008	65.28% 610,413	33.22% 310,586	1.50% 14,021
2004	63.91% 573,626	35.33% 317,150	0.76% 6,783
2000	58.34% 449,014	40.00% 307,924	1.66% 12,772

Politically, East Tennessee has historically been an outlier in Tennessee and the South. It is one of the few regions in the South that have consistently voted Republican since the Civil War and one of the oldest Republican regions in the United States. Several counties in the region, such as Johnson and Unicoi, are among the few in the country to have never voted for a Democrat in a presidential election.

The state's 1st and 2nd congressional districts, anchored in the Tri-Cities and Knoxville respectively, are among the few ancestrally Republican regions in the South. The 1st has been held by Republicans or their predecessors without interruption since 1881, and for all but four years since 1859. The 2nd has been in the hands of Republicans or their predecessors since 1855. Until the 1950s, congressmen from the 1st and 2nd Districts were among the few truly senior Republican congressmen from the South. Historically, Democrats were more competitive in the Chattanooga-based 3rd district, but recent trends have made it almost as staunchly Republican as the 1st and 2nd districts.

East Tennessee Republican leanings are rooted in its antebellum Whig sentiments; historian O.P. Temple actually traces this sentiment back to the anti-aristocratic Covenanters of Scotland. As in much of southern Appalachia, the region's yeoman farmers clashed with the large-scale planters and business interests that controlled the Democratic Party and dominated most southern state legislatures. East Tennesseans revered the likes of John Sevier and Davy Crockett and were drawn to the political philosophies of Henry Clay and Daniel Webster. They tended to reject the policies of the Southern Democrats, who were deemed "aristocratic" (Andrew Jackson's popularity in the Chattanooga area— which he helped open to European-American settlement— created a stronger Democratic base in southeastern Tennessee, however). In the early 1840s, state Senator Andrew Johnson actually introduced a bill in the state legislature that would have created a separate state in East Tennessee.

While the Whigs disintegrated in the 1850s, East Tennesseans continued their opposition to Southern Democrats with the Opposition Party and the Constitutional Union Party, the latter capturing the state's electoral votes in 1860. Pro-Union sentiment during the Civil War (which was reinforced by the Confederate army's occupation of the region) evolved into support for President Abraham Lincoln. The congressmen from the 1st and 2nd districts were the only congressmen who did not resign when Tennessee seceded. The residents of those districts immediately identified with the Republicans after hostilities ceased and have supported the Republican Party ever since.

The Radical Republican post-war policies of Governor Brownlow greatly polarized the state along party lines, with East Tennesseans mostly supporting Brownlow and Middle and West Tennesseans mostly rejecting him. The Southern Democrats regained control of the state government in the early 1870s, but Republican sentiment remained solid in East Tennessee, especially in the 1st and 2nd Districts. By the 1880s, the state's Democrats had an unwritten agreement with the state's Republicans whereby Republicans would split presidential patronage of Republican presidencies with the Democrats so long as the Democrats allowed them continued influence in state affairs.

In 1888, Pennsylvania-born Henry Clay Evans was elected to the congressional seat for the 3rd District. Evans, who rejected compromise and the splitting of presidential patronage with the state's Democrats, strongly supported a bill that would have turned over control of state elections to the federal government. In response, the state legislature gerrymandered the 3rd District, ensuring Evans' defeat in 1890. After 1901, more than a half-century passed without the state legislature redistricting, in spite of population shifts. In 1959, Memphis resident Charles Baker sued the legislature in hopes of forcing it to redraw the districts, culminating in the landmark U.S. Supreme Court case Baker v. Carr. In the decades after this case, the 3rd District has been redrawn several times, and a new 4th District was carved in part out of the 1st, 2nd and 3rd Districts. The 2000s round of redistricting made the 3rd more Republican and the 4th more Democratic. After the 2010 elections and the redistricting before 2012, though, the Republicans in control of state government made both the 3rd and 4th Districts significantly more Republican, and both are now among the most Republican districts in the country.
