= First Presbyterian Church (Greeneville, Tennessee) =

Historic church in Tennessee, United States

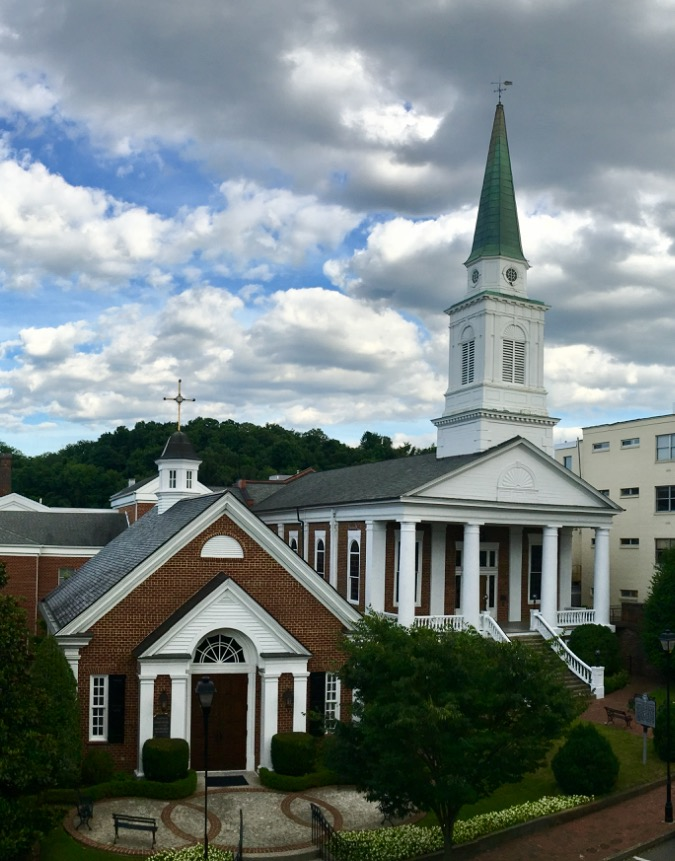
- First Presbyterian Church and adjacent Christ Chapel
- First Presbyterian Church
- Location: 110 North Main Street, Greeneville, Tennessee
- Country: United States
- Denomination: Presbyterian Church (USA)
- Churchmanship: Reformed
- Website: www.firstpresgreeneville.org

History
- Former name: Mount Bethel Presbyterian Church Harmony Church Greeneville Presbyterian Church
- Status: Church
- Founded: 1780
- Founder: Rev. Samuel Doak

Architecture
- Functional status: active
- Heritage designation: NRHP
- Designated: May 3, 1974
- Architectural type: Greek Revival
- Completed: 1848

Clergy
- Pastor: Rev. J. Todd Jenkins
- First Presbyterian Church
- U.S. Historic district – Contributing property
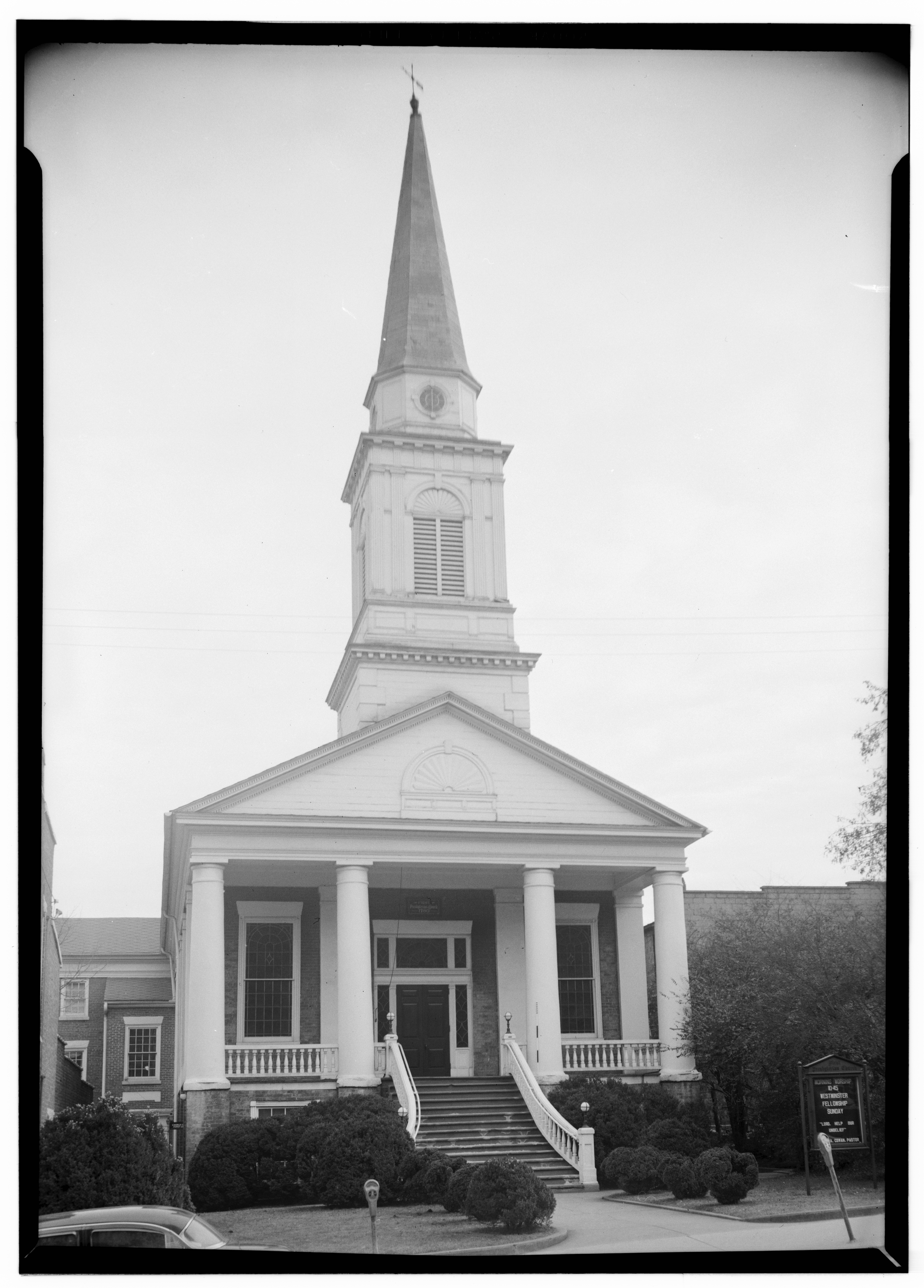
- First Presbyterian Church in 1958
- Location: 110 North Main Street; Greeneville, Tennessee
- Built: 1847
- Architectural style: Greek Revival
- Part of: Greeneville Historic District (Greeneville, Tennessee) (ID74001913)
- Designated CP: May 3, 1974

The First Presbyterian Church in Greeneville, Tennessee is a historic congregation of the Presbyterian Church (U.S.A.) located in downtown Greeneville, TN. It was the first church established in Greeneville and is one of the oldest churches in the State of Tennessee. First Presbyterian Church, originally Mount Bethel Presbyterian Church, was first gathered in 1780 at the Big Spring in downtown Greeneville, with the first services preached by traveling frontier minister Samuel Doak. In 1783, regular services began, and Rev. Hezekiah Balch was the first settled minister.

== History ==
A log church was built near the present day Greeneville Town Hall and in 1798 after a split involving a theological rift over Hopkinsianism, the church was renamed Harmony Church. In 1840, the name was changed to Greeneville Presbyterian Church. The present brick building was erected in 1848. In 1928, a fire destroyed the interior of the sanctuary; however, the brick walls were fortunately left intact. In 1940, the name was changed to First Presbyterian Church, as it exists today.

In 1926, a 3-story education wing was built. Christ Chapel was built and dedicated in 1999 and The Family and Nurture Center was dedicated in November 2000 under the direction of former senior minister, the Rev. Dr. Daniel Donaldson.

The church and its congregation were heavily involved in the abolitionist movement in East Tennessee. Rev. Hezekiah Balch freed his slaves at the Greene County Courthouse in 1807. Rev. Samuel Doak, the founder of Tusculum College, followed in 1818. Francis McCorkle, the pastor of Greeneville's Presbyterian Church, was a leading member of the Manumission Society of Tennessee.

First Presbyterian Church is the parent church of Tusculum College. It is listed as a historic place with the Tennessee Historical Commission (marker 1C-59) and is also listed on the National Register of Historic Places as part of the Greeneville Historic District.

When the church split in 1798, members that adhered to the Old School theology kept the name Mount Bethel. Later, Mount Bethel merged with Covenant Presbyterian of Tusculum, which in 1990, merged with First Presbyterian ending a 192 year separation.

== Pipe Organs ==
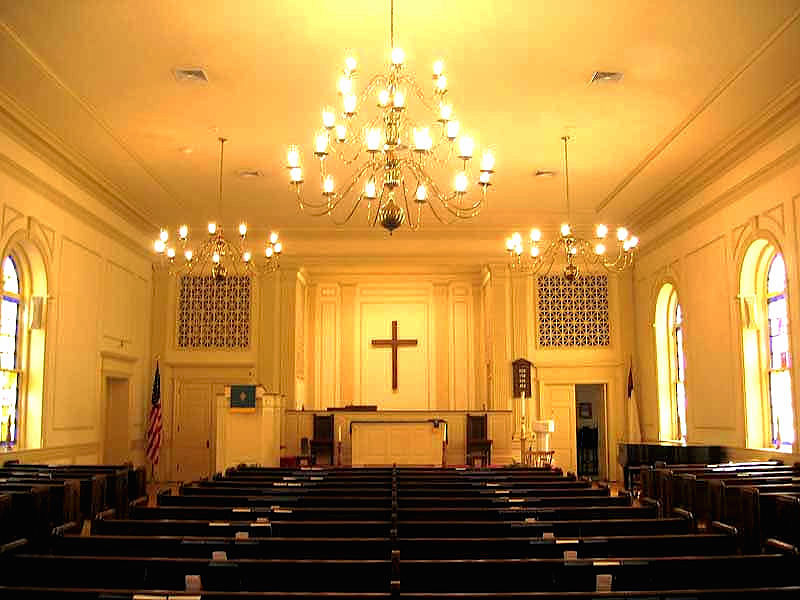
Sanctuary of First Presbyterian Church

In 1905, the first pipe organ, an Estey Organ, was purchased and subsequently installed. In 1924, the organ was improved by the M. P. Möller Company of Hagerstown, Maryland. The instrument was two manuals and pedal, of 20 ranks. This instrument was destroyed by a fire in 1928 that gutted the interior of the sanctuary. The congregation quickly rebuilt, replacing the organ with essentially the same instrument. In 1945, a three rank antiphonal division was installed in the balcony.

In 1964, a new three manual instrument was built by the Greenwood Organ Company of Charlotte, North Carolina. This was a 21 rank instrument, including the antiphonal division. Much of the pipework from the previous Möller instrument was re-voiced and re-used, with 10 ranks being new A set of chimes was also added to the instrument at this time.

In the early 1990s, the Schantz Organ Company of Orrville, Ohio was contracted to build a new instrument of 27 ranks and 1,630 pipes. Fifteen ranks of pipes were completely new (essentially the Great and Choir divisions), while some pipes and materials were carried over from the 1964 instrument. The organ is split in chambers on either side of the chancel, with the Great and Choir on the left, and the Swell and Pedal on the right.

In 1999, the J. F. Nordlie Company, of Sioux Falls, South Dakota built their Opus 16 instrument for Christ Chapel. The instrument has 8 ranks and 381 pipes.

== Clergy ==
- 1780 - Samuel Doak, Supply Minister
- 1783 - Hezekiah Balch, First Minister
- 1810 - Charles Coffin
- 1820 - Christopher Bradshaw
- 1829 - Francis A. McCorkle
- 1850 - Ira Morey
- 1857 - E.T. Brantley
- 1865 - John W. Elliott
- 1868 - Samuel V. McCorkle
- 1875 - John E. Alexander
- 1878 - Samuel V. McCorkle
- 1881 - A.M. Hooke
- 1882 - S.A. Coile
- 1889 - Edgar C. Mason
- 1891 - S.A. Coile
- 1895 - W.H. Lester
- 1900 - R.F. Wertz
- 1904 - John S. Eakin
- 1918 - O.G. Klinger
- 1921 - Jere Moore
- 1948 - Robert C. Johnson
- 1956 - Roger A. Cowan
- 1960 - Hugh V. Simon
- 1986 - G.K. Preston III
- 1998 - Daniel M. Donaldson
- 2019 - J. Todd Jenkins

== See also ==
- Oldest churches in the United States
