= New Bethel Presbyterian Church (Piney Flats, Tennessee) =

Coordinates: 36.4234°N 82.3550°W

New Bethel Presbyterian Church is the oldest Presbyterian congregation in Tennessee, according to church historian Maynard Pittendreigh, who authored a book about the congregation. It is located in the Tri-Cities area of Tennessee, in the tiny hamlet of Piney Flats.

== Early history, 1776-1800 ==
The church was founded by the Reverend Dr. Joseph Rhea, who was the pastor of the Piney Creek Presbyterian Church in Maryland. He joined a military campaign in 1776 as chaplain. Serving in Tennessee, he fell in love with the rich farmland and clear streams. He returned to Maryland and motivated the members of his congregation to move to Tennessee with him. Rhea died en route, but his family and many parishioners made Tennessee their new home. Charles Cummings, a visiting Presbyterian from Abingdon, Virginia, encouraged the settlers to build a house of worship, which they did.

Henry Massengale/Massengill later wrote, "We hailed his coming with great joy for our souls were hungering and thirsting for spiritual nourishment. He urged the settlers to build a house of worship which we decided to do. I was to furnish logs, boards and all timbers needed to build a large house, with a section of benches in the back side for the Massengale and Cobb negroes, numbering at this time, 151 souls, so these slaves can come out and be refreshed in body and soul. This house of worship was completed by July 1777, and was known as the Massengill House of Worship."

Shortly afterward, Samuel Doak took charge of the new congregation. Doak is credited with being Tennessee's first Christian minister. There were, of course, others who preceded Doak, but none of them became residents of Tennessee. Some were chaplains serving in Tennessee for a short time. Others were visiting preachers from Virginia serving the few and scattered settlers. Doak, on the other hand, made his home in Tennessee. Once here, he founded some 25 churches and several schools, including Washington Academy and Tusculum College.

The young Doaks found life on the frontier difficult. At one time, Samuel Doak left his home in the Forks Community to go to nearby Abingdon, Virginia, for supplies. He left his wife and child at home. A barking dog warned Esther Doak of the approach of a group of hostile Cherokees. With the baby asleep in her arms, she quietly left the cabin and hid in the woods. She watched the Indians rob the house of some furniture before setting the building on fire. Throughout the entire ordeal, the baby slept quietly. After the Indians left, the pioneer woman walked through the forest. With no path to follow, she was able to locate her husband at or near Abingdon. [Pittendreigh]

Indians were not the only threat Doak had to face. He was also involved in the Revolutionary War against the British. Late in 1780 Doak was among those who joined the forces to fight in the Battle of King's Mountain. The Battle of Kings Mountain turned the tide of the Revolutionary War in the South and helped secure an American Independence.

During Samuel Doak’s ministry at New Bethel, the church formed its Session, or governing body, in 1779, making the Session of New Bethel the oldest Presbyterian session in the state of Tennessee. It is also the oldest continuing governing body in the state of Tennessee. The charter elders of the session were John Alison, James Gregg, and Francis Hodge.

== Recent history ==
New Bethel is the mother church of Soul Winners Chapel and Bertha King Memorial Presbyterian Church (Rocky Springs).

The Rev. Dr. Maynard Pittendreigh served the church in the 1990s and wrote an extensive history of the congregation, "A People of Faith."

New Bethel was among the first churches to have its own web page on the Internet.

In 2024, the pastor is Scott Wise Cre III.
