= Hezekiah Balch =

American abolitionist and minister (1741-1810)

Hezekiah Balch, D.D. (1741–1810) was a Presbyterian minister and the founder of Greeneville College in Greeneville, Tennessee in 1794. After the Civil War, Greeneville College merged with what is now Tusculum University.

== Early life and education ==
He was born in 1741 in Harford County, Maryland, along Deer Creek. While he was still a child, Balch's family moved south to Mecklenburg County, North Carolina. Due to the recommendation of a local preacher, he attended Princeton starting in 1758. In 1766, Balch received his Master of Arts from Princeton and was licensed to preach August 11, 1768. He was ordained as an evangelist on March 8, 1770.

== Work ==
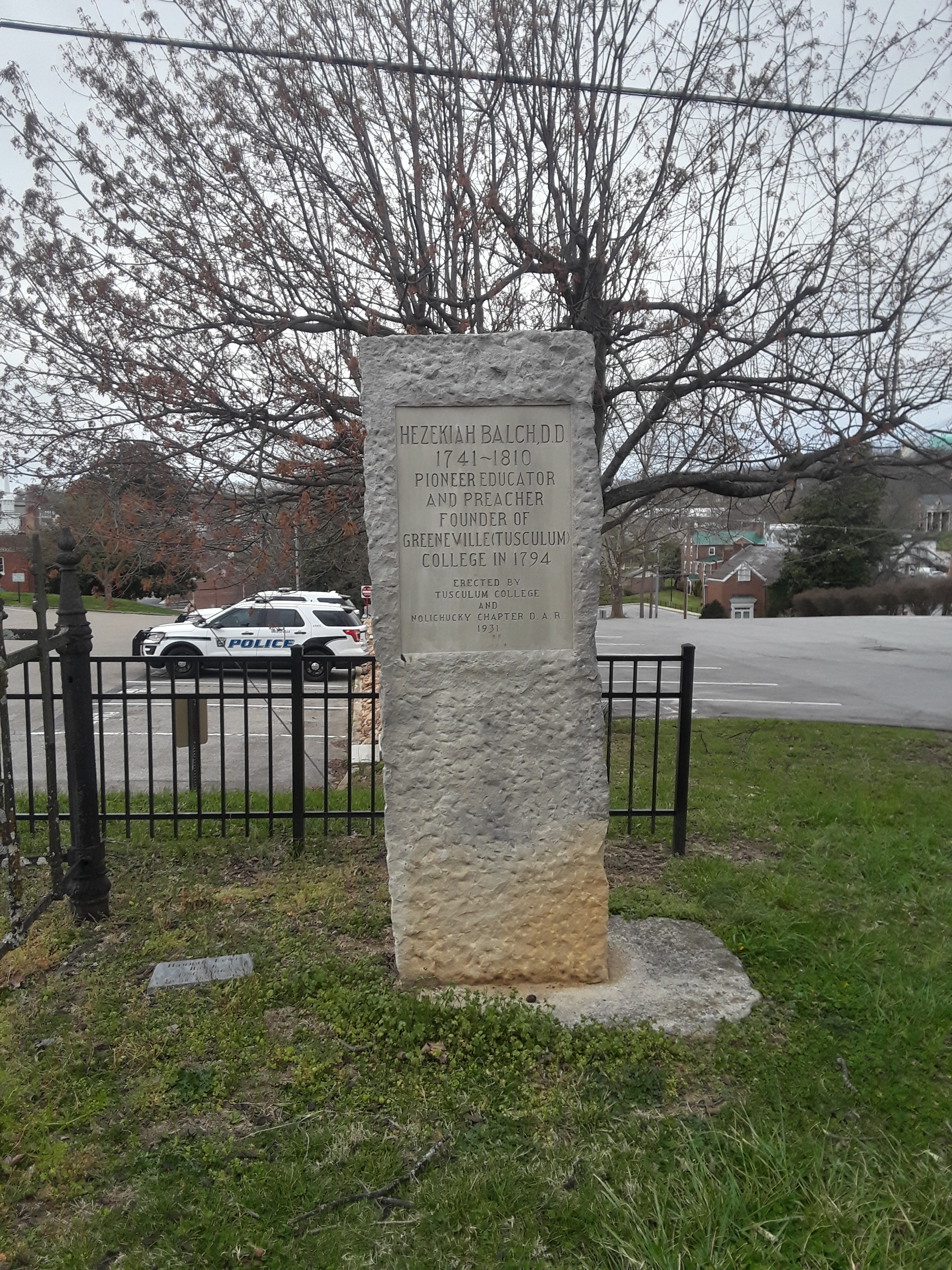
Balch's grave in the Old Harmony Cemetery, Greeneville

Balch's first acts as a pastor were as a missionary in the rural areas of Maryland, Pennsylvania, and North Carolina. After his travels as a missionary, he settled in Greeneville, Tennessee and then became the first settled pastor of what is now First Presbyterian Church in 1783. In 1794 he was granted a charter for Greeneville College, the first act of the Territorial Legislature which predated the state of Tennessee. On a fundraising trip north in 1795, Balch came into contact with Drs. Samuel Hopkins and Nathanael Emmons and became a devoted follower. Hopkinsians are known for "disinterested benevolence"—sacrificing one's self-interest in favor of love for and union with Christ. In this, they were strong abolitionists. There is no doubt that Balch's connection with Hopkins influenced a group of leading Presbyterian ministers in Eastern Tennessee, an influence that extended to the abolitionist movement in the state in the 1830s.

Balch's zeal for Hopkinsian theology drew scorn back at home among staunch Calvinists such as the Rev. Samuel Doak. He responded by publishing his "Articles of Faith" in the Knoxville Gazette in 1796. Subsequently, he was called before the Presbytery sixteen times, before the Synod four times, and once before the General Assembly. Additionally, his church in Greeneville split over the theology in a foreshadowing of the Old School/New School theological rift to encompass Presbyterians nationally in 1837–38.

Balch's Greeneville College, is claimed to be the first college west of the Allegheny Mountains. The school's first location was a frame building on Balch's farm. At the first meeting of the school's board of trustees, on 18 February 1795, Balch was chosen as the college's president. Other Trustees were Archibald Roane, Joseph Hamilton, William Cocke, Daniel Kennedy, Landon Cater, Joseph Hardin Sr., John Rhea, and soon to be Governor, John Sevier. Beginning in 1800, he was assisted by Dr. Charles Coffin who followed him as the second president of the college. Balch stayed in the position until his death in 1810. In 1806, Balch received a Doctor of Divinity from Williams College.

== Death ==
The last years of Balch's life were plagued with illness, but in April 1810, Balch came down with "brief but most distressing illness" and died. He was buried in Harmony Graveyard in Greeneville, Tennessee.
