= Samuel Doak =

American clergyman and abolitionist (1749–1830)

Samuel Doak (1749–1830) was an American Presbyterian clergyman, Calvinist educator, and a former slave owner in the early movement in the United States for the abolition of slavery.

== Early life ==
Samuel Doak was born August 1, 1749, in Augusta County, Virginia, to Scotch-Irish immigrants Samuel and Jane (Mitchell) Doak. He grew up on a frontier farm and began his education with Robert Alexander, who later founded the Academy of Liberty Hall (now Washington and Lee University). After attending an academy in Maryland, he entered the College of New Jersey (now Princeton), from which he graduated two years later in 1775. Doak married Esther Houston Montgomery of Augusta County in October 1775.

== Career ==
Doak taught at Hampden-Sydney College in the spring of 1776. There he studied theology under president Samuel Stanhope Smith, and completed his theological training in 1777 at Liberty Hall. He assumed his first pastorate in Abingdon, Virginia, and also began to "ride circuit" in eastern Tennessee.

In 1778 Doak settled in Tennessee in Sullivan County and was ordained a Presbyterian minister. Moving to the Holston valley in Tennessee, Doak assumed the Presbytery's charge to serve the congregation of the Fork Church, now known as New Bethel Presbyterian Church.

In 1780, Doak relocated from Sullivan County to Washington County, near present-day Limestone, Tennessee, where he founded Salem Presbyterian Church, built a home, and constructed a school. This school was recognized by the North Carolina General Assembly in 1783 and renamed to Martin Academy in honor of Governor Alexander Martin. Martin Academy expanded in 1795 as Washington College. Doak served as president of Washington College (1795-1818) before turning it over to his oldest son, John Whitfield Doak. Esther Doak had died in 1807, and in 1818 he moved with his second wife, Margaretta Houston McEwen, to Tusculum Academy (later Tusculum College) and taught there with his son Samuel W. Doak until his death on December 12, 1830. He is buried at Salem Church.

He would regularly preach to settlers at the Big Spring at Greeneville, Tennessee in present-day Greene County. Later in 1783, Mt. Bethel Presbyterian Church (now First Presbyterian Church) was formed with Hezekiah Balch being the first settled minister.

Doak was awarded a Doctor of Divinity degree for his tireless efforts at promoting Presbyterianism and education. He was generally known as "the Presbyterian Bishop."

After becoming convinced of the iniquity of slavery, he freed his own slaves in 1818. Afterwards, for the rest of his life, Doak advocated immediate abolition. He was referred to as being "the apostle of learning and religion in the West."

== Legacy ==
Three schools in Greene County are named for Samuel Doak:

- Doak Elementary School, located less than a mile away from his two-story home
- Chuckey-Doak Middle School, estimated at a mile away
- Chuckey-Doak High School, directly behind the middle school

The Doak House Museum is a non-profit, educational institution, established as a museum in 1975.
