= Copper Basin =

Copper Basin may refer to:

- Copper Basin (Tennessee)
- Copper Basin (Nevada)
- Copper Basin Railway, Arizona
- Copper Basin High School, Copperhill, Tennessee
