= Kimsey Junior College =

Institution Of Education

Coordinates: 35°02′57.2″N 84°23′18.9″W

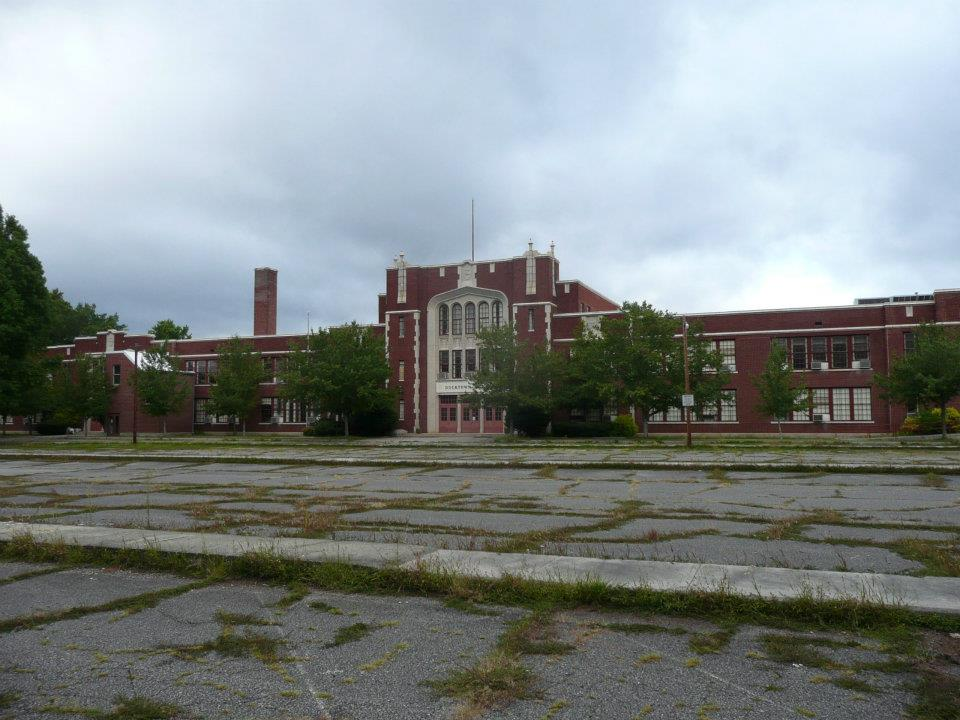
Kimsey Junior College

Located in Ducktown, Tennessee, Kimsey Junior College was originally constructed in 1933 by the Fourth Fractional Township with the intention of serving as a junior college for the region. The building is named for one of the commissioners of the township at the time its construction was commissioned. Due to the isolation of the Copper Basin from major population centers in the state, the building was never used for its intended purpose.

The Kimsey Junior College building remained vacant until 1938 when Ducktown High School and Ducktown Elementary School relocated to the site. The high school remained in the building until 1956. The elementary school remained in the facility until 2006 when an agreement was reached to consolidate Ducktown and Turtletown Elementary Schools. Although the site was more centrally located for consolidation, concerns over ownership and maintenance costs led to the decision to move to another site. The new location chosen was the old Copper Basin High School building, thus the Kimsey Junior College building was vacated. In September 1992, the building was placed on the National Register of Historic Places.

Since 2007, the site has remained vacant although there has been interest expressed in the building for use as a community center, office space, and an assisted living facility. The building is still owned and maintained by the Fourth Fractional Township, one of the last remaining entities of its kind in the state. The township consists of a three-person board which provides security for the site and maintenance of the 150-acre tract the building occupies.

Kimsey Junior College is noted for the construction materials as well as its architecture. Designed by architect Reuben H. Hunt as a Collegiate Gothic style building, Kimsey Junior College is the only structure designed by an architect in the Copper Basin. The inside of the building also shows the expense used in its construction and contains a large auditorium and gymnasium.

The site is beginning to show signs of disrepair due to its age and vacancy. The parking lot in front of the building is becoming overgrown, several windows and doors are damaged, and remnants of the elementary school are still inside the building. In 2008, the building was placed on Tennessee's list of most endangered historic sites on the national register by the Tennessee Preservation Trust. In 2009, grant funds from the National Park Service were used to make repairs to the roof and walls of the structure; however, work is still required to complete roof repairs.

In 2022, the property was sold to a private individual who has converted it into a residence while hosting a variety of community events.
