= Copper Basin High School =

Public high school in Polk County, Tennessee, United States

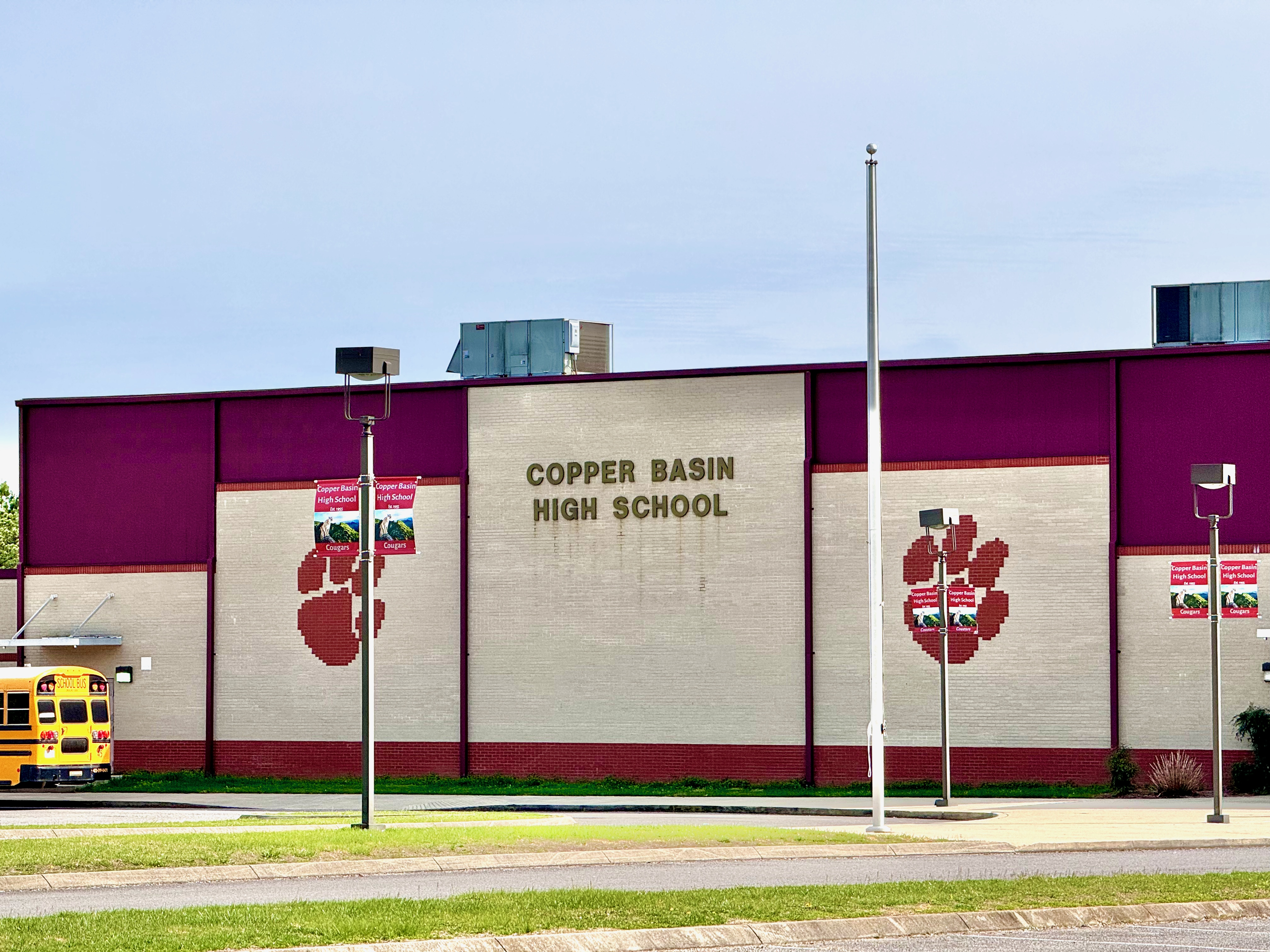

Location
- 300 Cougar Drive; Copperhill, Tennessee; 37317; United States
- Coordinates: 35.0198°N 84.3872°W

Information
- Type: Public
- School district: Polk County Schools
- Principal: Holly Smith
- Faculty: 36
- Teaching staff: 26.33 (FTE)
- Grades: 7-12
- Enrollment: 244 (2023–2024)
- Student to teacher ratio: 9.27
- Campus type: Rural
- Colors: Red and gray
- Athletics conference: Tennessee Secondary School Athletic Association (TSSAA)
- Nickname: Cougars
- Website: polk-schools.com/copper-basin-high-school

Copper Basin High School is a public high school in Polk County, Tennessee, located between Copperhill and Ducktown. The school is one of two public high schools in the Polk County Schools district, the other being Polk County High School, of which it maintains a rivalry with. The school primarily serves the area in eastern Polk County known as Copper Basin. The school also enrolls grades 7 and 8 at the campus.

Holly Smith is the current principal.

== Athletics ==
Copper Basin offers football, baseball, softball, boys' and girls' basketball, boys' and girls' golf, and volleyball. Their sports teams are known as the Cougars.

== Demographics ==
As of the 2016–17 school year, Copper Basin High School enrolled 329 students. 51.67% of the students were male, and 48.33% were female. The racial and ethnic makeup of the student body was 96.96% non-Hispanic white, 1.82% African American, and 1.22% Hispanic or Latino (of any race).
