= Ducktown Basin Museum and Burra Burra Mine =

Burra Burra Mine
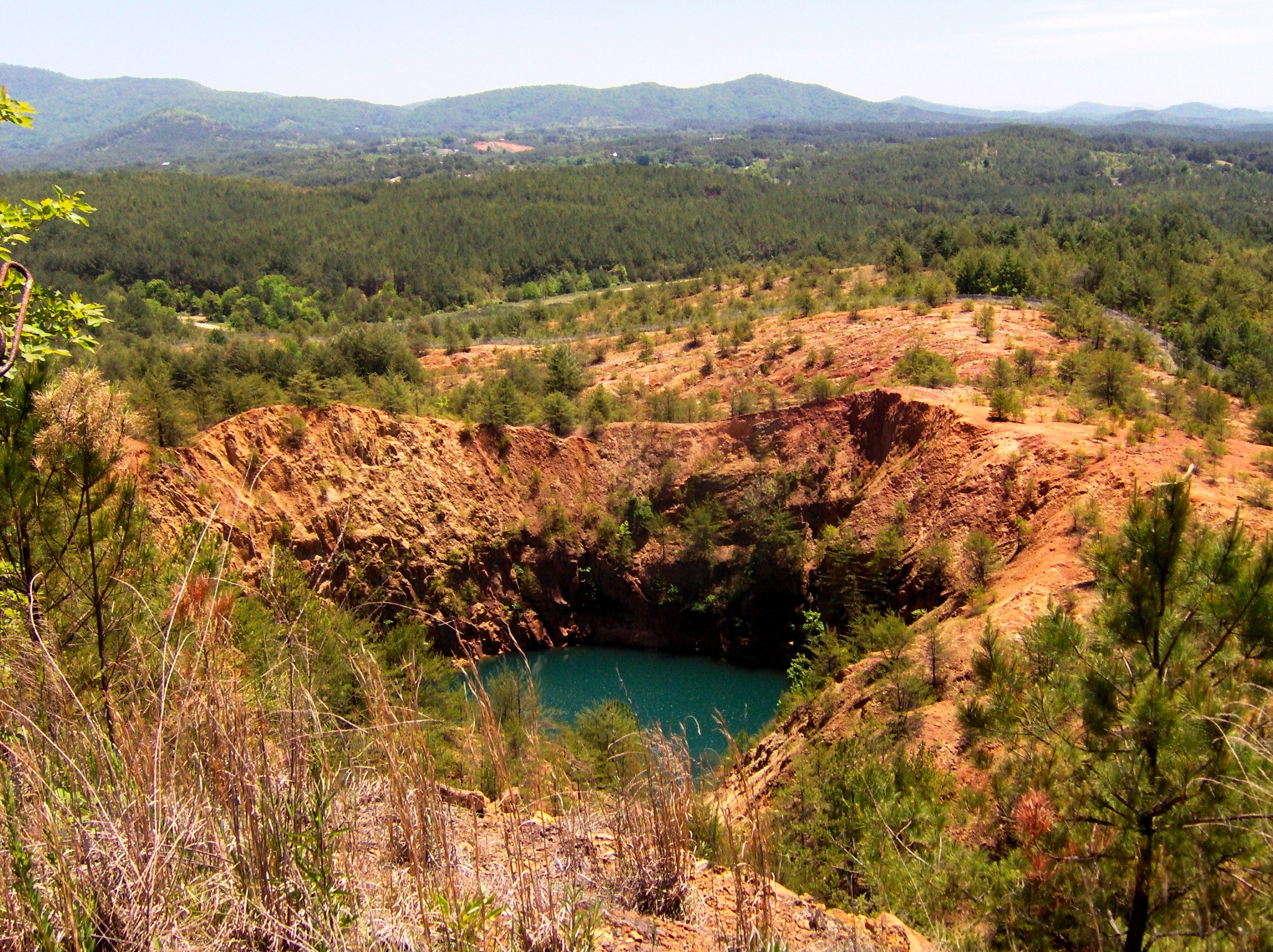
- Burra Burra Mine collapse site
- Interactive map of Burra Burra Mine
- Location: Ducktown, Tennessee; 35°2′7″N 84°22′46″W
- Products: Copper
- Active: 60
- Closed: 1959
- Burra Burra Mine Historic District
- U.S. National Register of Historic Places
- U.S. Historic district
- Location within Tennessee Location within the United States
- Built: 1899
- NRHP reference No.: 83003059
- Added to NRHP: 1983

The Burra Burra Mine is a copper mine located in Ducktown, Tennessee, in the southeastern United States. Named for the famous mine in Australia, the Burra Burra Mine is located in the Copper Basin geological region, and extracted over 15 million tons (14 million metric tons) of copper ore during its 60 years of operation between 1899 and 1959. The mine's remaining structures are listed on the National Register of Historic Places as part of the Burra Burra Mine Historic District. The site is also home to the Ducktown Basin Museum, and the museum and mine are a Tennessee State Historic Site operated in partnership with the Tennessee Historical Commission.

The Burra Burra Mine was one of a number of mining operations in the Copper Basin from 1850 to 1987 that produced substantial amounts of copper ore that contained sulfur. Trees were cut to smelt the ore and burn off the sulfur. Both the tree-harvesting and the sulfuric acid pollution left more than 32,000 acres (50 sq mi)—(13,000 hectares (130 km^{2})— of the basin eroded and virtually devoid of life, though the area has begun to recover after decades of re-greening efforts.

== Geographical setting ==
The Burra Burra Mine is located near the center of the Copper Basin also known as the Ducktown Basin, a broad valley in the southern Appalachian Mountains near the common borders of Tennessee, North Carolina, and Georgia. Ducktown, the location of the Burra Burra Mine, is in the center of the Copper Basin near the juncture of Tennessee State Route 68 and U.S. Route 64. The mine is also located about 2 miles (3.2 km) north of Copperhill, near the Tennessee-Georgia border,

The mine is at 35°02′07″N 084°22′46″W, at an altitude of 1,798 feet (548 m) above mean sea level.

== History ==
The Copper Basin, also known as the Ducktown Basin, is a geological feature located mostly within Polk County, Tennessee which contains extensive deposits of copper ore, as well as many other minerals. The Copper Basin was part of Cherokee lands until 1836, when the Cherokee relinquished control of the basin to the U.S. government. The basin became part of the Ocoee District, which mostly consisted of what is now Polk County. While most Cherokees in the area were forced out as part of the Indian Removal of 1838, some managed to avoid detection and would later aide in road construction and mining operations.

Copper was first discovered in the Copper Basin in 1843 on a hill immediately southwest of what would eventually become the Burra Burra Mine (a reconstructed boiler chimney and Tennessee Historical Commission marker now mark the site along TN-68). In 1860, several small-scale mining operations in the basin were consolidated to form the Burra Burra Copper Company, which was placed under the direction of mining engineer Julius Raht (1826–1879).

Copper from the basin was extensively mined between 1847 and 1987. In 1899, the Tennessee Copper Company, which had bought most of the mining operations in the Copper Basin, constructed a smelter at Copperhill and began work on the Burra Burra Mine at Ducktown. The company's open roast smelting method released large amounts of sulfur dioxide into the air, killing off all vegetation in the central basin. The Burra Burra Mine eventually became the most productive mine in the Copper Basin. Mining activities began to decline in the mid-1950s, and by the time the Burra Burra Mine closed in 1958, its vertical shaft was over 2,400 feet (730 m) deep, making it one of the deepest vertical shafts in the North America. After the mine's closure, operations continued at other deposits within the Basin.

In 1978, the museum was established by a group of local citizens intent on preserving the heritage of the mining activities in the basin. Initially, the museum was located on Main Street in Ducktown. In 1982, the museum was moved to its present location. The adjacent Burra Burra Mine was placed on the National Register of Historic Places (NRHP) the following year.

== The Burra Burra Mine today ==
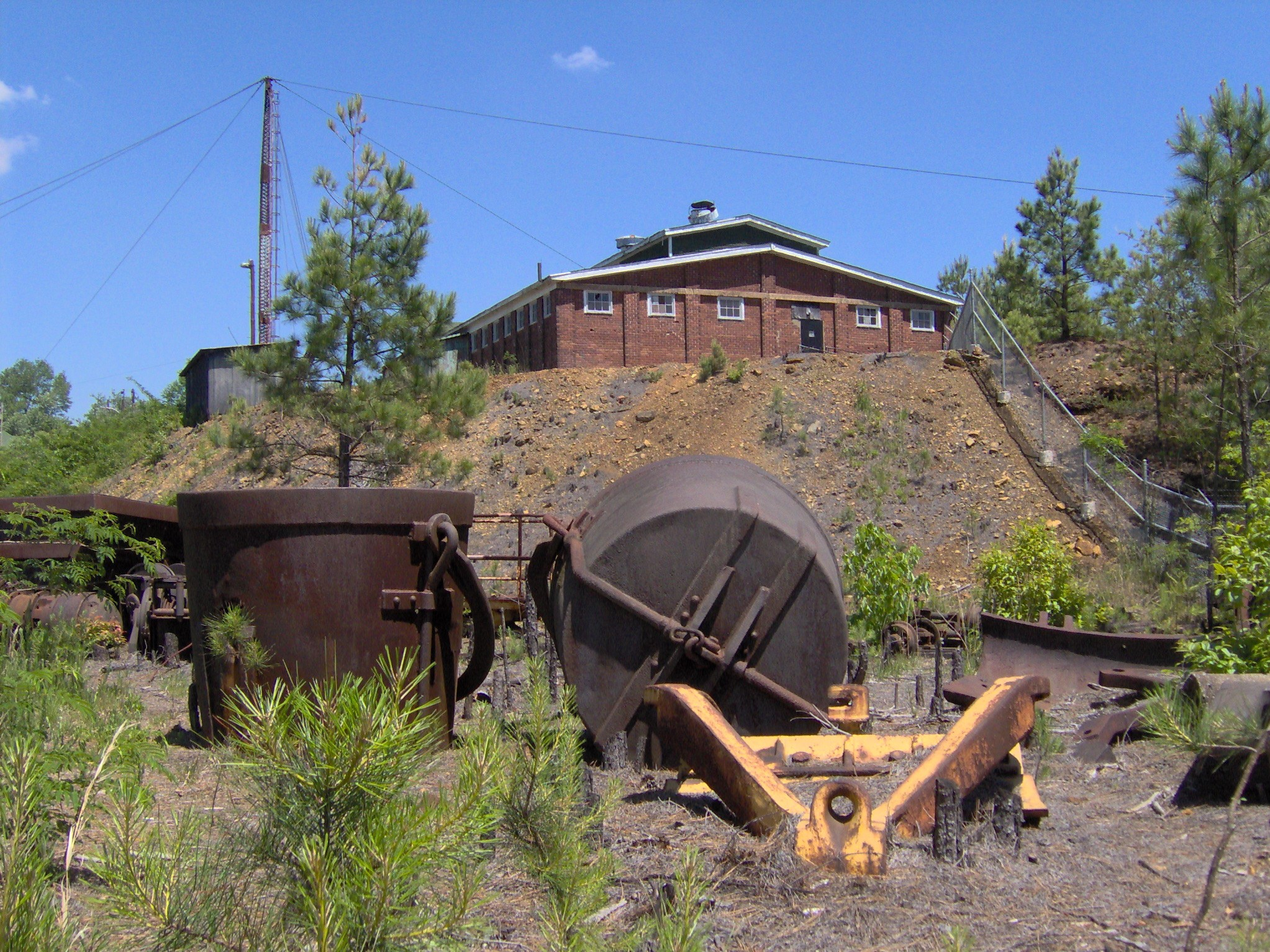
Mining machine parts and tools scattered about the Burra Burra Mine site

Mining ceased in the Copper Basin in 1987 when the Tennessee Chemical Company (Tennessee Copper's successor) filed for bankruptcy and sold off its holdings. As part of re-greening efforts, 16 million trees have been planted and the basin has been seeded with acid-tolerant grass. The Burra Burra Mine was part of a 300-acre (1.2 km^{2}) stretch of land near the center of the basin selected to be exempted from the reclamation efforts to serve as a reminder of how the entire central basin once appeared. The Ducktown Museum and Burra Burra Mine were purchased by the state of Tennessee in 1988. The museum's establishment and assembly was due in large part to the basin's residents, many of whom remain fiercely loyal to the mining industry.

Ten of the mine's structures remain, including its hoist house, boiler building, powder house, and machine shops. The old engineers' office building now houses the Ducktown Basin Museum. Various machine parts, tools, and other artifacts used in the basin's mining operations are displayed on the museum's grounds. The museum's parking lot overlooks a massive sinkhole (now filled with water) created when part of the Burra Burra Mine collapsed.

== Ducktown Basin Museum ==
Ducktown Basin Museum
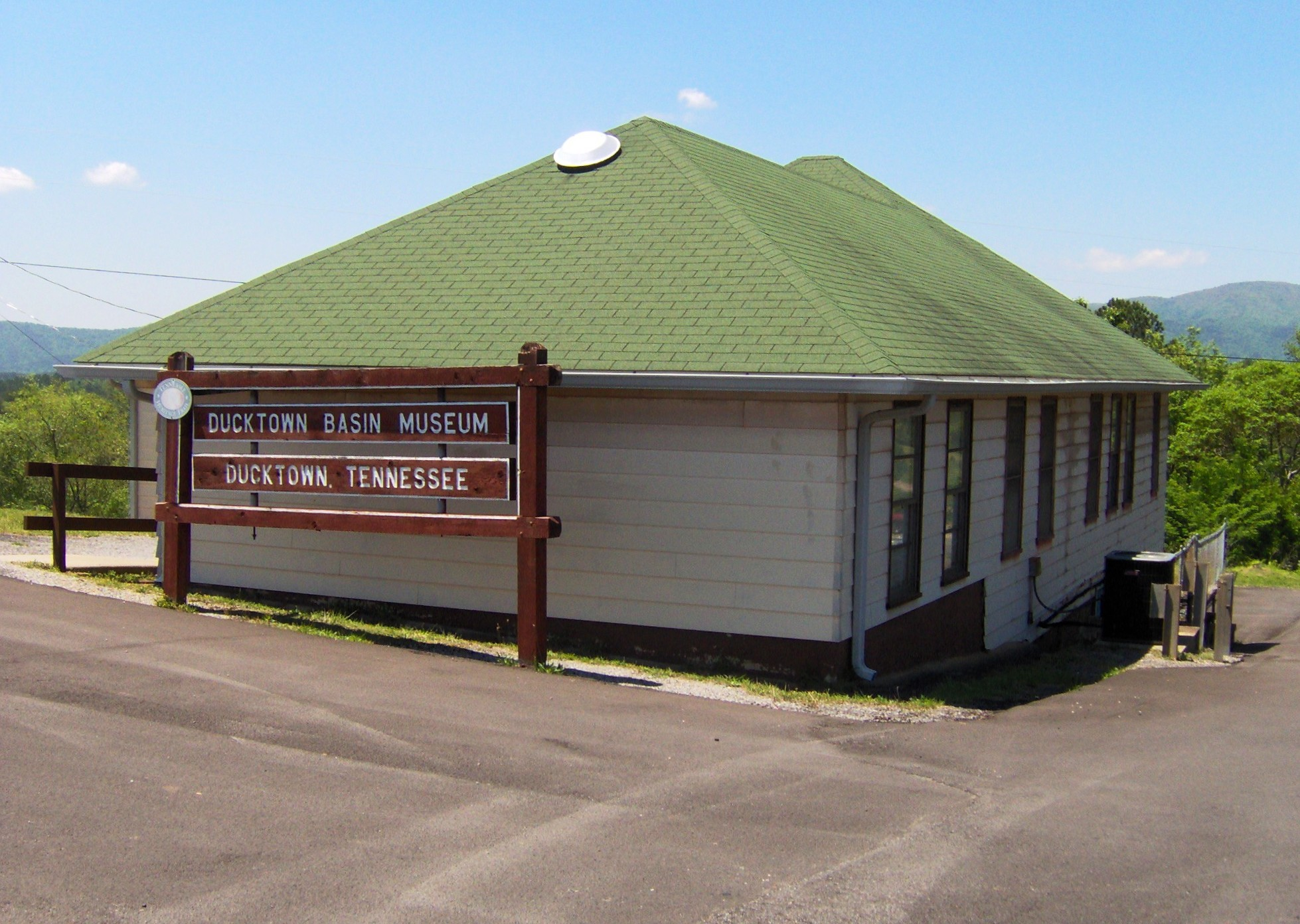
- Established: 1978
- Location: 212 Burra Burra Street Ducktown, Tennessee, United States
- Coordinates: 35°02′08″N 84°22′43″W
- Type: History museum, heritage center
- Owner: Ducktown Basin Museum
- Website: www.ducktownbasinmuseum.com

The Ducktown Basin Museum is a history museum and heritage center in Ducktown, Tennessee that chronicles the history of copper mining activities in the Copper Basin, a geological region in Polk County, Tennessee.

=== Exhibits ===
The museum is located in a building that formerly served as the headquarters of the Tennessee Copper Company, one of the major entities that operated mines in the basin. This site, jointly known as the Ducktown Basin Museum & Burra Burra Mine State Historic Site, is owned by the Tennessee Historical Commission, and consists of 10 buildings on 17 acres. The first exhibit in the museum is a geological history of the Copper Basin. This is followed by several exhibits about the history of the mining and sulfuric acid production activities in the basin, as well as the lives of the miners and residents of the mining towns in the basin. Many artifacts from the mining activities are included in the exhibits. The museum also includes an exhibit about the environmental problems that resulted from the mining activities in the basin, and the subsequent cleanup and restoration efforts.

== See also ==
- Copper Basin (Tennessee)
- Copper mining in the United States
