= Julius Eckhardt Raht =

German-American mining engineer (1826-1879)

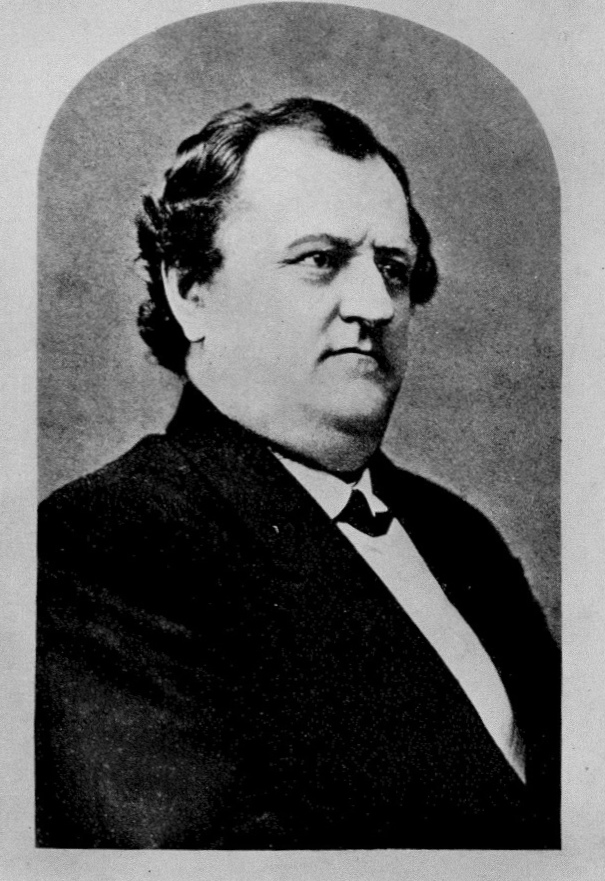
J. E. Raht, c. 1870

Julius Eckhardt Raht (June 26, 1826 – August 15, 1879) was a mining engineer, entrepreneur, and businessman who pioneered the mining and smelting of copper in the Copper Basin in Eastern Tennessee and reputedly became the richest man in the state.

Raht was born in Dillenburg, Duchy of Nassau (today a town in the Lahn-Dill-Kreis in the state of Hesse, Germany). The son of an appellate judge, Raht attended the University of Bonn, 1844–45, and then the University of Berlin, 1845–47, where he studied "chemistry, mineralogy, etc. etc." After the failed German revolution of 1848, Raht immigrated to the United States in 1850 and became a citizen in 1853.

Raht worked for short periods in Missouri, Dubuque, Iowa, and Wisconsin before taking charge of mining at Harpers Ferry, Leesburg, and Jamestown, Virginia, and Guilford County, North Carolina. By 1854, he decided that the best opportunity to make his fortune lay in the copper mining industry near Ducktown, Tennessee, in the extreme southeastern corner of the state. After a brief trip to Germany to marry Mithilde Dombois, Raht became "captain" of a mining operation. Six years later he was chief of operations of all the mines and smelting works at Ducktown and had already purchased a farm and mule teams for copper hauling. He also engaged in what was to become his most profitable enterprise, running commissaries for the miners. As his biographer has written, Raht was "spirited, methodical, ambitious, honest...no less a stern taskmaster in his own behalf than he was a loyal employee of those in whose interests he served." Soon he was wealthy enough to lend money to his erstwhile employers.

Early in the Civil War, the Confederate government effectively confiscated the Ducktown mines. Raht at first continued to operate them in an attempt to protect the investments of the owners in New York and New Orleans; but in 1863, after he was forced to purchase a Confederate army substitute and Federal troops destroyed the rail facilities and copper rolling mill in nearby Cleveland, Raht crossed the lines to live out the remainder of the war in Cincinnati, where there was a significant German community.

Following the war, Raht once again operated the Ducktown mines, personally financing much of the necessary repairs, but he maintained his home and office in Cleveland. He founded the Cleveland National Bank and became manager of the Ocoee Turnpike and Plank Road Co., a transportation route needed to move copper to the nearest railroad. Raht had hidden some copper in the mines during the war, and he managed to produce more than a million pounds of copper during the first year of peace. He also built new smelters using innovative methods developed by his brothers, including steam engines and diamond and compressed air drills. Nevertheless, falling copper prices, lower quality ore, and the lack of a rail connection culminated in the temporary closing of the mines in 1878. As the local mining industry was dying, shareholders of the United Consolidated Mining Company unsuccessfully sued Raht believing that his great wealth must have been created from their loss. "The truth was much simpler. He made his fortune legally by running a commissary business to supply food and sundries to the miners, and then by making shrewd investments of his profits throughout Ducktown and eastern Tennessee."

Raht and his wife had twelve children, six sons and two daughters surviving to maturity. Raht made numerous donations to charitable causes, especially churches and schools. Officially a Republican, he was "more interested in politics as a science of attaining desired ends than in politics as the term is more commonly understood." Though a nominal Lutheran, he was not a church goer. A lover of the table, Raht's "voracious appetite transformed his stocky and powerful figure into one of commanding rotundity." He died suddenly of a heart attack on August 15, 1879.
