= List of United States Supreme Court cases, volume 218 =

Supreme Court of the United States
- Interactive map of Supreme Court of the United States
- 38°53′26″N 77°00′16″W
- Established: March 4, 1789; 236 years ago
- Location: Washington, D.C.
- Coordinates: 38°53′26″N 77°00′16″W
- Composition method: Presidential nomination with Senate confirmation
- Authorised by: Constitution of the United States, Art. III, § 1
- Judge term length: life tenure, subject to impeachment and removal
- Number of positions: 9 (by statute)
- Website: supremecourt.gov

This is a list of cases reported in volume 218 of United States Reports, decided by the Supreme Court of the United States in 1910.

== Justices of the Supreme Court at the time of volume 218 U.S. ==
The Supreme Court is established by Article III, Section 1 of the Constitution of the United States, which says: "The judicial Power of the United States, shall be vested in one supreme Court . . .". The size of the Court is not specified; the Constitution leaves it to Congress to set the number of justices. Under the Judiciary Act of 1789 Congress originally fixed the number of justices at six (one chief justice and five associate justices). Since 1789 Congress has varied the size of the Court from six to seven, nine, ten, and back to nine justices (always including one chief justice).

When the cases in volume 218 were decided the Court comprised the following members (although Chief Justice Fuller died, and Justice Moody retired, while the cases in this volume were being adjudicated):

Portrait	Justice	Office	Home State	Succeeded	Date confirmed by the Senate (Vote)	Tenure on Supreme Court
	Melville Fuller	Chief Justice	Illinois	Morrison Waite	July 20, 1888 (41–20)	October 8, 1888 – July 4, 1910 (Died)
	John Marshall Harlan	Associate Justice	Kentucky	David Davis	November 29, 1877 (Acclamation)	December 10, 1877 – October 14, 1911 (Died)
	Edward Douglass White	Associate Justice	Louisiana	Samuel Blatchford	February 19, 1894 (Acclamation)	March 12, 1894 – December 18, 1910 (Continued as chief justice)
	Joseph McKenna	Associate Justice	California	Stephen Johnson Field	January 21, 1898 (Acclamation)	January 26, 1898 – January 5, 1925 (Retired)
	Oliver Wendell Holmes Jr.	Associate Justice	Massachusetts	Horace Gray	December 4, 1902 (Acclamation)	December 8, 1902 – January 12, 1932 (Retired)
	William R. Day	Associate Justice	Ohio	George Shiras Jr.	February 23, 1903 (Acclamation)	March 2, 1903 – November 13, 1922 (Retired)
	William Henry Moody	Associate Justice	Massachusetts	Henry Billings Brown	December 12, 1906 (Acclamation)	December 17, 1906 – November 20, 1910 (Retired)
	Horace Harmon Lurton	Associate Justice	Tennessee	Rufus W. Peckham	December 20, 1909 (Acclamation)	January 3, 1910 – July 12, 1914 (Died)
	Charles Evans Hughes	Associate Justice	New York	David Josiah Brewer	May 2, 1910 (Acclamation)	October 10, 1910 – June 10, 1916 (Resigned)

== Citation style ==
Under the Judiciary Act of 1789 the federal court structure at the time comprised District Courts, which had general trial jurisdiction; Circuit Courts, which had mixed trial and appellate (from the US District Courts) jurisdiction; and the United States Supreme Court, which had appellate jurisdiction over the federal District and Circuit courts—and for certain issues over state courts. The Supreme Court also had limited original jurisdiction (i.e., in which cases could be filed directly with the Supreme Court without first having been heard by a lower federal or state court). There were one or more federal District Courts and/or Circuit Courts in each state, territory, or other geographical region.

The Judiciary Act of 1891 created the United States Courts of Appeals and reassigned the jurisdiction of most routine appeals from the district and circuit courts to these appellate courts. The Act created nine new courts that were originally known as the "United States Circuit Courts of Appeals." The new courts had jurisdiction over most appeals of lower court decisions. The Supreme Court could review either legal issues that a court of appeals certified or decisions of court of appeals by writ of certiorari.

Bluebook citation style is used for case names, citations, and jurisdictions.

- "# Cir." = United States Court of Appeals
  - e.g., "3d Cir." = United States Court of Appeals for the Third Circuit
- "C.C.D." = United States Circuit Court for the District of . . .
  - e.g.,"C.C.D.N.J." = United States Circuit Court for the District of New Jersey
- "D." = United States District Court for the District of . . .
  - e.g.,"D. Mass." = United States District Court for the District of Massachusetts
- "E." = Eastern; "M." = Middle; "N." = Northern; "S." = Southern; "W." = Western
  - e.g.,"C.C.S.D.N.Y." = United States Circuit Court for the Southern District of New York
  - e.g.,"M.D. Ala." = United States District Court for the Middle District of Alabama
- "Ct. Cl." = United States Court of Claims
- The abbreviation of a state's name alone indicates the highest appellate court in that state's judiciary at the time.
  - e.g.,"Pa." = Supreme Court of Pennsylvania
  - e.g.,"Me." = Supreme Judicial Court of Maine

== List of cases in volume 218 U.S. ==
Case Name	Page & year	Opinion of the Court	Concurring opinion(s)	Dissenting opinion(s)	Lower Court	Disposition
Sistare v. Sistare	1 (1910)	White	none	none	Conn.	reversed
Rankin v. Emigh	27 (1910)	White	none	none	Wis.	affirmed
Louisville & N.R.R. Co. v. Melton	36 (1910)	White	none	none	Ky.	affirmed
Shevlin-Carpenter Co. v. Minnesota	57 (1910)	McKenna	none	none	Minn.	affirmed
Chiles v. Chesapeake & O.R.R. Co.	71 (1910)	McKenna	none	none	Ky.	affirmed
Standard Oil Co. v. Brown	78 (1910)	McKenna	none	none	D.C. Cir.	affirmed
ICC v. Chicago et al. R.R. Co.	88 (1910)	McKenna	none	White	C.C.N.D. Ill.	reversed
ICC v. Chicago et al. R.R. Co.	113 (1910)	McKenna	none	none	C.C.N.D. Ill.	reversed
In re Cleland	120 (1910)	Holmes	none	none	C.C.E.D. Mich.	mandamus denied
Dozier v. Alabama	124 (1910)	Holmes	none	none	Ala.	reversed
Thomas v. Sugarman	129 (1910)	Holmes	none	none	2d Cir.	reversed
Herndon v. Chicago et al. R.R. Co.	135 (1910)	Day	none	none	C.C.W.D. Mo.	affirmed
Roach v. Atchison et al. R.R. Co.	159 (1910)	Day	none	none	C.C.W.D. Mo.	affirmed
Franklin v. South Carolina	161 (1910)	Day	none	none	S.C.	affirmed
Watson v. Maryland	173 (1910)	Day	none	none	Md.	affirmed
City of Omaha v. Omaha W. Co.	180 (1910)	Lurton	none	none	8th Cir.	affirmed
Hertz v. Woodman	205 (1910)	Lurton	none	McKenna	7th Cir.	certification
United States v. Chicago et al. R.R. Co.	233 (1910)	Harlan	none	none	8th Cir.	affirmed
Holt v. United States	245 (1910)	Holmes	none	none	C.C.W.D. Wash.	affirmed
Jennings v. Philadelphia et al. R.R. Co.	255 (1910)	Lurton	none	none	D.C. Cir.	affirmed
Rickey L. & C. Co. v. Miller	258 (1910)	Holmes	none	none	9th Cir.	affirmed
The Ira M. Hedges	264 (1910)	Holmes	none	none	S.D.N.Y.	reversed
Ong Chang Wing v. United States	272 (1910)	Day	none	none	Phil.	affirmed
Kerfoot v. Farmers' & M. Bank	281 (1910)	Hughes	none	none	Mo.	affirmed
Richardson v. Ainsa	289 (1910)	Holmes	none	none	Sup. Ct. Terr. Ariz.	affirmed
Duryea P. Co. v. Sternbergh	299 (1910)	Holmes	none	none	3d Cir.	dismissed
Ling Su Fan v. United States	302 (1910)	Lurton	none	none	Phil.	affirmed
In re Metropolitan T. Co.	312 (1910)	Hughes	none	none	2d Cir.	mandamus granted
Hooe v. United States	322 (1910)	Harlan	none	none	Ct. Cl.	affirmed
Cincinnati et al. R.R. Co. v. City of Connersville	336 (1910)	Harlan	none	none	Ind.	affirmed
National Bank v. Downie	345 (1910)	Harlan	none	none	9th Cir.	affirmed
Ladew v. Tennessee C. Co.	357 (1910)	Harlan	none	none	C.C.E.D. Tenn.	affirmed
Wetmore v. Tennessee C. Co.	369 (1910)	Harlan	none	none	C.C.E.D. Tenn.	affirmed
Montezuma C. Co. v. Smithville C. Co.	371 (1910)	White	none	none	Sup. Ct. Terr. Ariz.	reversed
Roura v. Philippines	386 (1910)	White	none	none	Phil.	affirmed
Moffitt v. Kelly	400 (1910)	White	none	none	Cal.	affirmed
Western Union T. Co. v. Commercial M. Co.	406 (1910)	McKenna	none	none	Mich.	affirmed
Moore P.T. Co. v. National S. & T. Co.	422 (1910)	McKenna	none	none	D.C. Cir.	affirmed
Arkansas S.R.R. Co. v. Louisiana & A.R.R. Co.	431 (1910)	Holmes	none	none	La.	affirmed
Fisher v. City of New Orleans	438 (1910)	Holmes	none	none	La.	dismissed
Harlan v. McGourin	442 (1910)	Day	none	none	C.C.N.D. Fla.	affirmed
United States v. Ansonia B. & C. Co.	452 (1910)	Day	none	none	Va.	multiple
Chantangco v. Abaroa	476 (1910)	Lurton	none	none	Phil.	affirmed
Richardson v. McChesney	487 (1910)	Lurton	none	none	Ky.	dismissed
United States ex rel. Hine v. Morse	493 (1910)	Lurton	none	none	D.C. Cir.	reversed
Eagle M. & I. Co. v. Hamilton	513 (1910)	Hughes	none	none	Sup. Ct. Terr. N.M.	affirmed
United States v. Mason	517 (1910)	Hughes	none	none	C.C.D. Mass.	affirmed
United States v. Heinze I	532 (1910)	McKenna	none	none	C.C.S.D.N.Y.	reversed
United States v. Heinze II	547 (1910)	McKenna	none	none	C.C.S.D.N.Y.	reversed
Illinois C.R.R. Co. v. Kentucky	551 (1910)	Hughes	none	none	Ky.	affirmed
Griffith v. Connecticut I	563 (1910)	White	none	none	Conn.	affirmed
Griffith v. Connecticut II	572 (1910)	White	none	none	Conn.	affirmed
Hunter v. Mutual R.L. Ins. Co.	573 (1910)	McKenna	none	none	N.Y. Sup. Ct.	affirmed
Calder v. Michigan ex rel. Att'y Gen.	591 (1910)	Holmes	none	none	Mich.	affirmed
United States v. Kissel	601 (1910)	Holmes	none	none	C.C.S.D.N.Y.	reversed
Thompson v. Thompson	611 (1910)	Day	none	Harlan	D.C. Cir.	affirmed
City of Memphis v. Cumberland T. & T. Co.	624 (1910)	Day	none	White	C.C.W.D. Tenn.	dismissed
City of Columbus v. Mercantile T. & D. Co.	645 (1910)	Lurton	none	none	C.C.N.D. Ga.	reversed
International T. Co. v. Peterson	664 (1910)	per curiam	none	none	multiple	reversed

== See also ==
- Certificate of division
