= McCaysville, Georgia =

- City
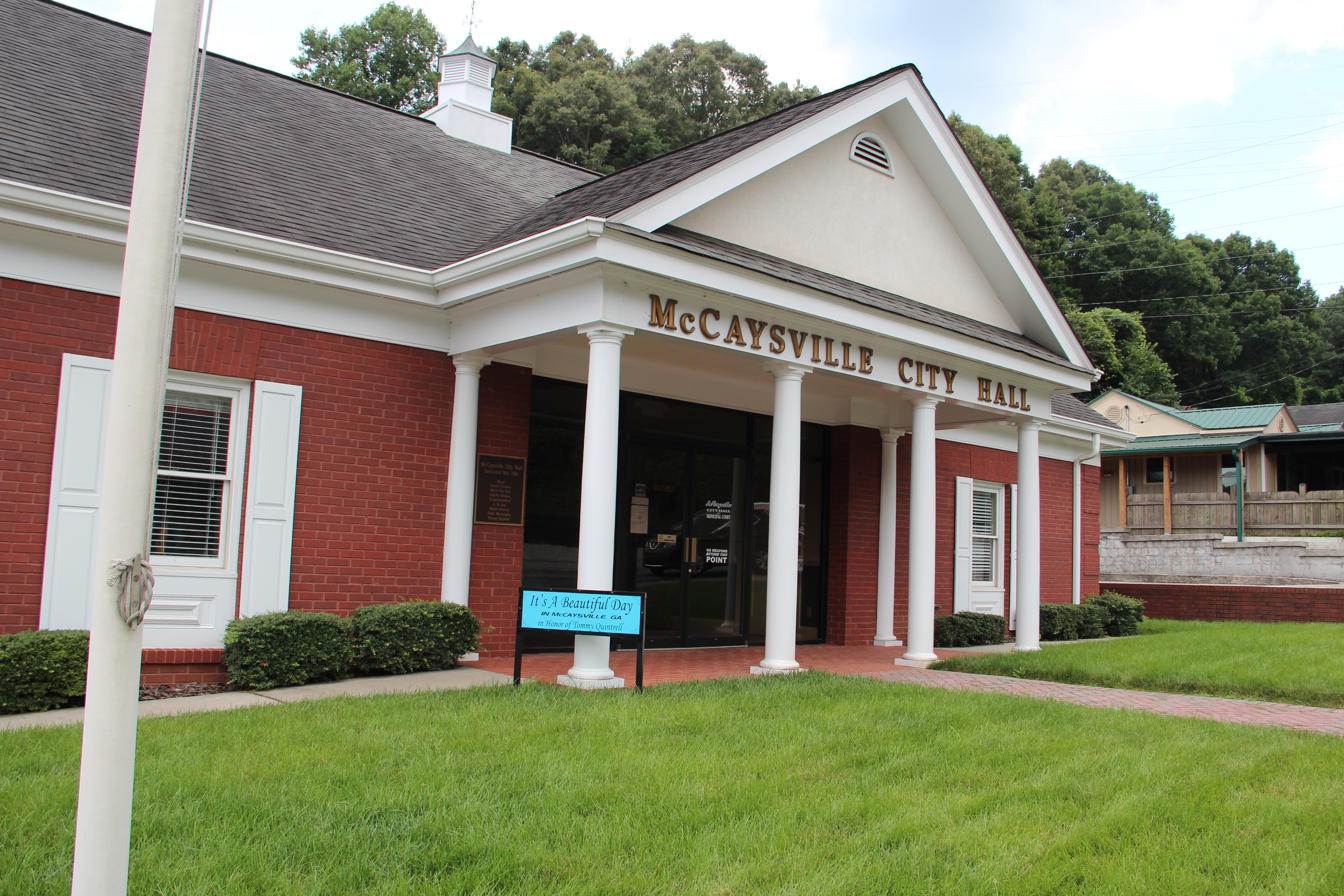
- McCaysville city hall

- Seal Logo

- Location in Fannin County and the state of Georgia
- Coordinates: 34°58′54″N 84°22′13″W
- Country: United States
- State: Georgia
- County: Fannin

Area
  - Total: 1.54 sq mi (4.00 km^{2})
  - Land: 1.51 sq mi (3.90 km^{2})
  - Water: 0.039 sq mi (0.10 km^{2})
- Elevation: 1,460 ft (450 m)

Population (2020)
  - Total: 1,149
  - Density: 764/sq mi (294.8/km^{2})
- Time zone: UTC-5 (Eastern (EST))
  - Summer (DST): UTC-4 (EDT)
- ZIP code: 30555
- Area code: Area codes 706
- FIPS code: 13-48428
- GNIS feature ID: 0328732
- Website: http://cityofmccaysvillega.gov

McCaysville is a city in Fannin County, Georgia, United States. The population was 1,149 at the 2020 census. It is the second largest city in Fannin County after Blue Ridge.

== History ==
Prior to European colonization, the area that is now McCaysville was inhabited by the Cherokee people and other Indigenous peoples for thousands of years.

The town was the center of an adoption scandal from the 1940s to the 1960s, in which a doctor engaged in the illegal selling of newborn babies, as many as 200, to local and out-of-state couples who didn’t have the time or money for legal adoptions, for prices ranging from hundreds to thousands of dollars.

On February 16, 1990, flooding of the river submerged much of the central business district of McCaysville and neighboring Copperhill. The river flooded again early on November 5, 2026, cresting just higher than the 1990 level, after very heavy rainfall near the city of Blue Ridge. Once again, much of the business district was submerged, with numerous businesses sustaining heavy damage. Numerous water rescues took place along the river in both Fannin and Polk counties, including at least 80 in Fannin County alone.

== Geography ==
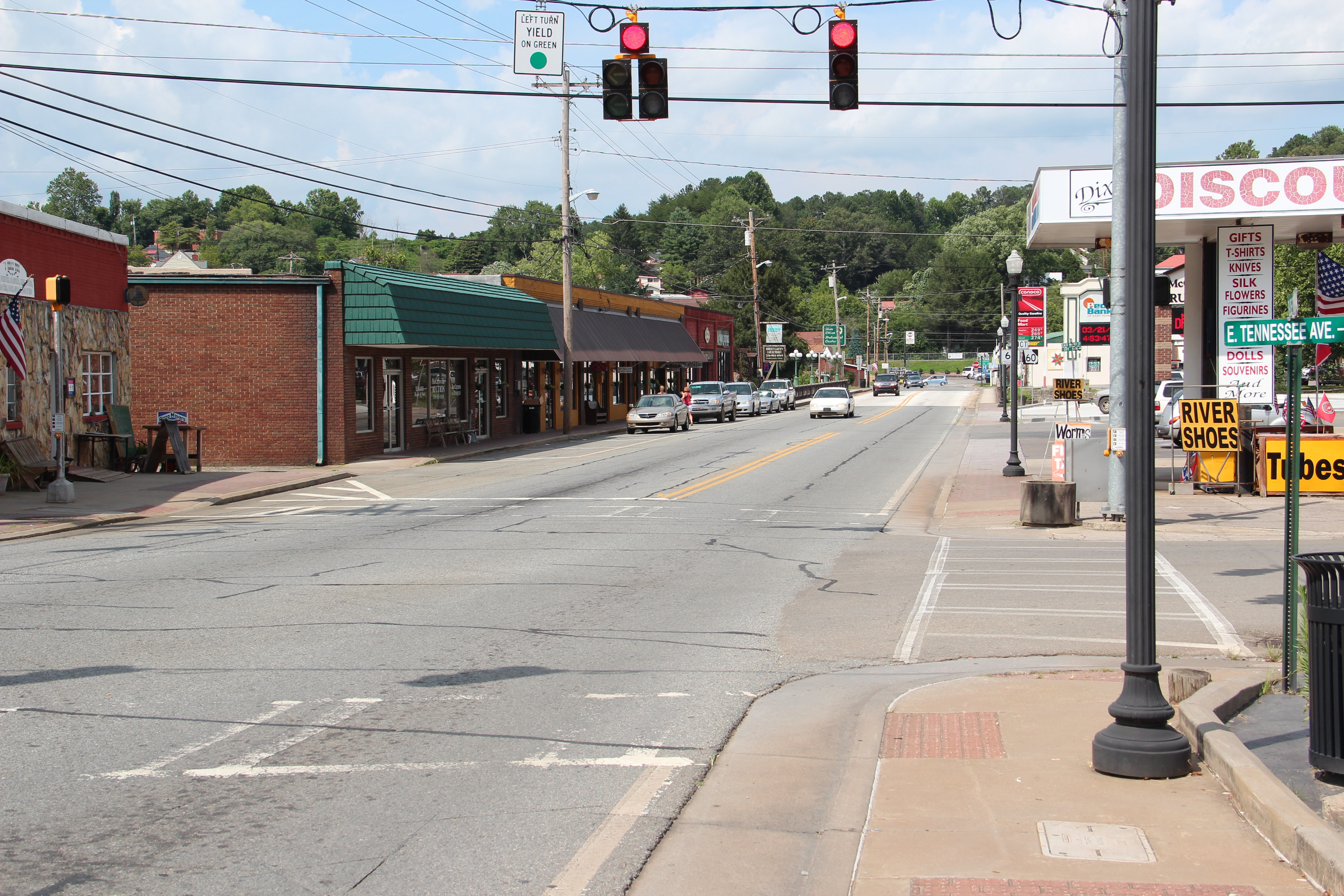
Downtown McCaysville

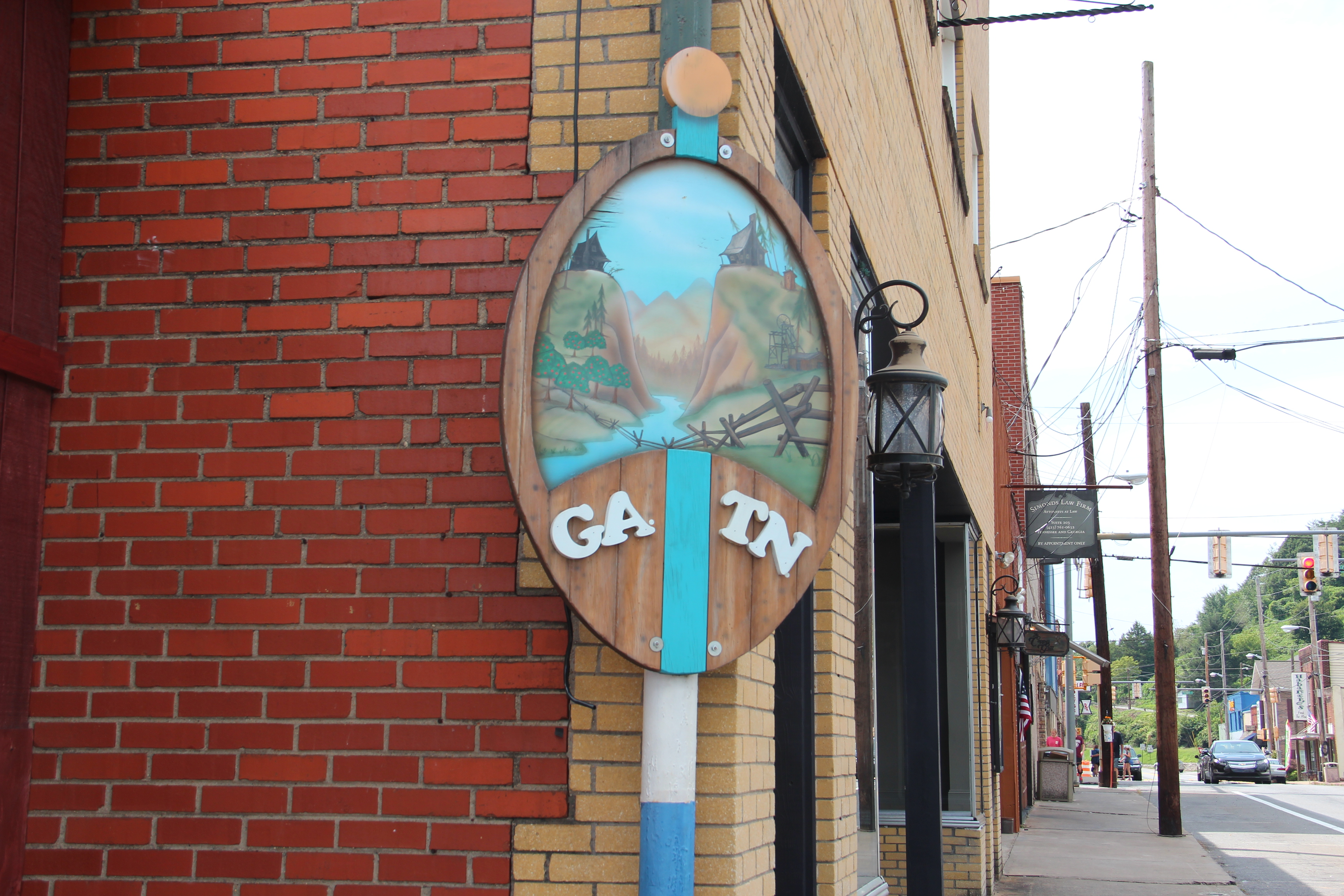
Georgia-Tennessee border in McCaysville/Copperhill

McCaysville is located along the northern border of Fannin County and the state of Georgia at 34°58′54″N 84°22′13″W (34.981534, -84.370293).On July 15, 1920, The Georgia senate passed the House bill 672 to incorporate the city of McCaysville. It is bordered to the north by its twin city of Copperhill, Tennessee. The two are situated as a single town along a river, known as the Toccoa River in Georgia and the Ocoee River in Tennessee. The change takes place in the middle of town at the state line, which runs diagonally relative to the street grid, which is aligned with the river rather than the border. The boundary also means that the McCaysville side is in area code 706, while the Copperhill side is in area code 423.

The main street through town is Georgia 60 (Toccoa Avenue) and Tennessee 68 (Ocoee Street). SR 60 leads southeast 8 miles (13 km) to Mineral Bluff, Georgia, while SR 68 leads north 4 miles (6 km) to Ducktown, Tennessee. Georgia State Route 5 crosses the Toccoa River and leads south 11 miles (18 km) to Blue Ridge, the Fannin County seat.

According to the United States Census Bureau, McCaysville has a total area of 1.60 square miles (4.15 km^{2}), of which 1.55 square miles (4.02 km^{2}) is land and 0.05 square miles (0.13 km^{2}), or 3.17%, is water.

== Climate ==
McCaysville's weather is temperate due to its elevation and location in the southern Appalachians. Summers are warm with average highs in the middle 80s and lows in the lower 60s. Winters are cool with average highs in the 40s and average lows in the 20s. Rainfall is abundant with the yearly average approaching 67 inches and occurring on 127 days. Snowfall usually occurs on several occasions during the winter months and can range from a light dusting to the occasional significant storm. The most significant snow storm to hit the area occurred March 12–14, 1993, when the area received approximately 40 inches in what eastern seaboard residents often refer to as "the storm of the century". The average first frost occurs in mid-October with the average last frost occurring in late April.

== Demographics ==
Historical population
| Census | Pop. | Note | %± |
|---|---|---|---|
| 1910 | 1,253 | | — |
| 1920 | 2,166 | | 72.9% |
| 1930 | 1,969 | | −9.1% |
| 1940 | 1,832 | | −7.0% |
| 1950 | 2,067 | | 12.8% |
| 1960 | 1,871 | | −9.5% |
| 1970 | 1,619 | | −13.5% |
| 1980 | 1,219 | | −24.7% |
| 1990 | 1,065 | | −12.6% |
| 2000 | 1,071 | | 0.6% |
| 2010 | 1,056 | | −1.4% |
| 2020 | 1,149 | | 8.8% |
U.S. Decennial Census

=== 2020 census ===
McCaysville racial composition
| Race | Num. | Perc. |
|---|---|---|
| White (non-Hispanic) | 1,019 | 88.69% |
| Native American | 2 | 0.17% |
| Asian | 4 | 0.35% |
| Other/Mixed | 74 | 6.44% |
| Hispanic or Latino | 50 | 4.35% |

As of the 2020 census, McCaysville had a population of 1,149. The median age was 43.9 years. 23.0% of residents were under the age of 18 and 23.1% of residents were 65 years of age or older. For every 100 females there were 78.7 males, and for every 100 females age 18 and over there were 72.5 males age 18 and over.

0.0% of residents lived in urban areas, while 100.0% lived in rural areas.

There were 536 households in McCaysville, of which 24.3% had children under the age of 18 living in them. Of all households, 31.0% were married-couple households, 18.3% were households with a male householder and no spouse or partner present, and 45.7% were households with a female householder and no spouse or partner present. About 43.7% of all households were made up of individuals and 24.0% had someone living alone who was 65 years of age or older. The city had 320 families.

There were 645 housing units, of which 16.9% were vacant. The homeowner vacancy rate was 3.8% and the rental vacancy rate was 5.1%.

=== 2010 census ===
As of the 2010 United States census, there were 1,056 people living in the city. The racial makeup of the city was 97.8% White, 0.2% Black, 0.6% Asian and 0.6% from two or more races. 0.9% were Hispanic or Latino of any race.

=== 2000 census ===
As of the census of 2000, there were 1,071 people, 540 households, and 324 families living in the city. The population density was 680.8 inhabitants per square mile (262.9/km^{2}). There were 604 housing units at an average density of 383.9 per square mile (148.2/km^{2}). The racial makeup of the city was 97.11% White, 0.19% African American, 0.65% Native American, 0.19% Asian, 0.93% from other races, and 0.93% from two or more races. Hispanic or Latino of any race were 1.40% of the population.

There were 540 households, out of which 20.7% had children under the age of 18 living with them, 40.9% were married couples living together, 14.8% had a female householder with no husband present, and 40.0% were non-families. 38.3% of all households were made up of individuals, and 23.9% had someone living alone who was 65 years of age or older. The average household size was 1.98 and the average family size was 2.57.

In the city, the population was spread out, with 17.9% under the age of 18, 6.3% from 18 to 24, 20.6% from 25 to 44, 26.3% from 45 to 64, and 28.8% who were 65 years of age or older. The median age was 48 years. For every 100 females, there were 77.6 males. For every 100 females age 18 and over, there were 73.7 males.

The median income for a household in the city was $18,583, and the median income for a family was $30,078. Males had a median income of $27,045 versus $20,185 for females. The per capita income for the city was $12,904. About 14.0% of families and 23.2% of the population were below the poverty line, including 23.7% of those under age 18 and 24.8% of those age 65 or over.

== Notable person ==
- Joe Tipton, Major League Baseball catcher
