= Polk County High School (Tennessee) =

Public high school in Polk County, Tennessee, United States

Location
- 7200 U.S. Route 411, Benton, Tennessee 37307; United States
- Coordinates: 35.1974°N 84.6210°W

Information
- Type: Public
- School district: Polk County Schools
- Principal: Rachel Lowe
- Teaching staff: 28.57 (FTE)
- Grades: 9–12
- Enrollment: 388 (2025-2026)
- Colors: Red, white and blue
- Team name: Wildcats
- Website: www.polkcountyhighschool.com

Polk County High School (PCHS) is a public high school located near Benton, Tennessee. It is one of two high schools in Polk County and the Polk County Schools district, the other being Copper Basin High School, with which it maintains a rivalry.

== Athletics ==
Polk County High is a member of the Tennessee Secondary School Athletic Association (TSSAA). Sports include baseball, basketball, cheerleading, cross country, football, golf, soccer, softball, tennis, track and field, volleyball, and wrestling. Girls' basketball won a state championship in 1981.
