= Little Frog Mountain =

Mountain in Tennessee, United States

Highest point
- Elevation: 3,337 ft (1,017 m)
- Prominence: 1,601 ft (488 m)
- Coordinates: 35°05′38″N 84°25′12″W

Geography
- Location: Polk County, Tennessee, United States
- Parent range: Blue Ridge Mountains

Little Frog Mountain is a mountain located in southeastern Tennessee in the United States. It is located in the Blue Ridge province of the Appalachian Mountains, and has an elevation of 3,337 feet (1,017 m).

== Geography ==
Little Frog Mountain is located within the Cherokee National Forest in Polk County, Tennessee, and anchors the Little Frog Wilderness. It consists of a series of ridges roughly running northeast. The Ocoee River flows along its southern base, and the Copper Basin is located directly to the east. Little Frog Mountain is accessible via a series of trails, and the Kimsey Mountain Highway, a forest service road. It may take its name from its nearby taller counterpart, Big Frog Mountain.
