= Copper Basin (Tennessee) =

Geological area in southeastern Tennessee, United States

- Ducktown Basin
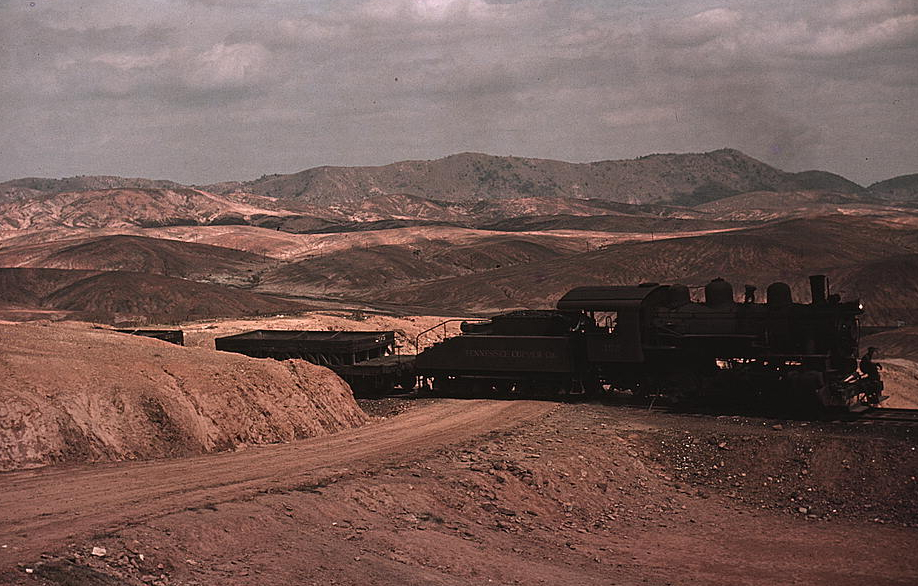
- Copper train in the basin (1939)
- Coordinates: 35.02°N 84.36°W
- Etymology: Copper, Ducktown
- Region: Appalachia
- Country: United States
- States: Tennessee, North Carolina, Georgia
- Cities: Ducktown and Copperhill, Tennessee and McCaysville, Georgia

Characteristics
- On/Offshore: Onshore
- Boundaries: Pack Mountain (E), Stansbury Mountain (N), Little Frog Mountain (NW), Big Frog Mountain (SW)
- Part of: Appalachian Basin
- Area: 60,000 acres (240 km^{2})

Hydrology
- River: Ocoee River

Geology
- Basin type: Sedimentary depression, rather than a structural basin
- Plate: North American
- Orogeny: Taconic (Middle Ordovician); Caledonian, Acadian, Ouachita, Hercynian & Alleghenian orogenies (Paleozoic and younger)
- Age: Paleozoic to Holocene
- Field: Burra Burra Mine

The Copper Basin, also known as the Ducktown Basin, is a geological region located primarily in Polk County, Tennessee, that contains deposits of copper ore and covers approximately 60,000 acres (24,000 hectares). Located in the southeastern corner of Tennessee, small portions of the basin extend into Fannin County, Georgia, and Cherokee County, North Carolina. The basin is surrounded by the Cherokee National Forest, and the cities of Ducktown and Copperhill, Tennessee, and McCaysville, Georgia are located in the basin.

Copper was first discovered in the basin in 1843, and by the 1850s large mining operations, spearheaded by German-born businessman Julius Eckhardt Raht, were taking place. The mines were seized by the Confederacy during the American Civil War and were the source of about 90% of the copper used by the Confederate Army. After the Civil War, smelting operations, which were used to separate sulfur from the copper ore, resulted in acid rain in the area. Combined with the logging of nearby forests to fuel the smelters, this resulted in a massive environmental disaster that left the surrounding landscape barren for more than a century. Several mines, the largest of which was the Burra Burra Mine, operated in the basin.

By the 1950s, mining operations in the Copper Basin began to decline, with the final mine closing in 1987. Today, the Ducktown Basin Museum chronicles the geological record and history of the mining operations in the basin.

== Geography and geology ==
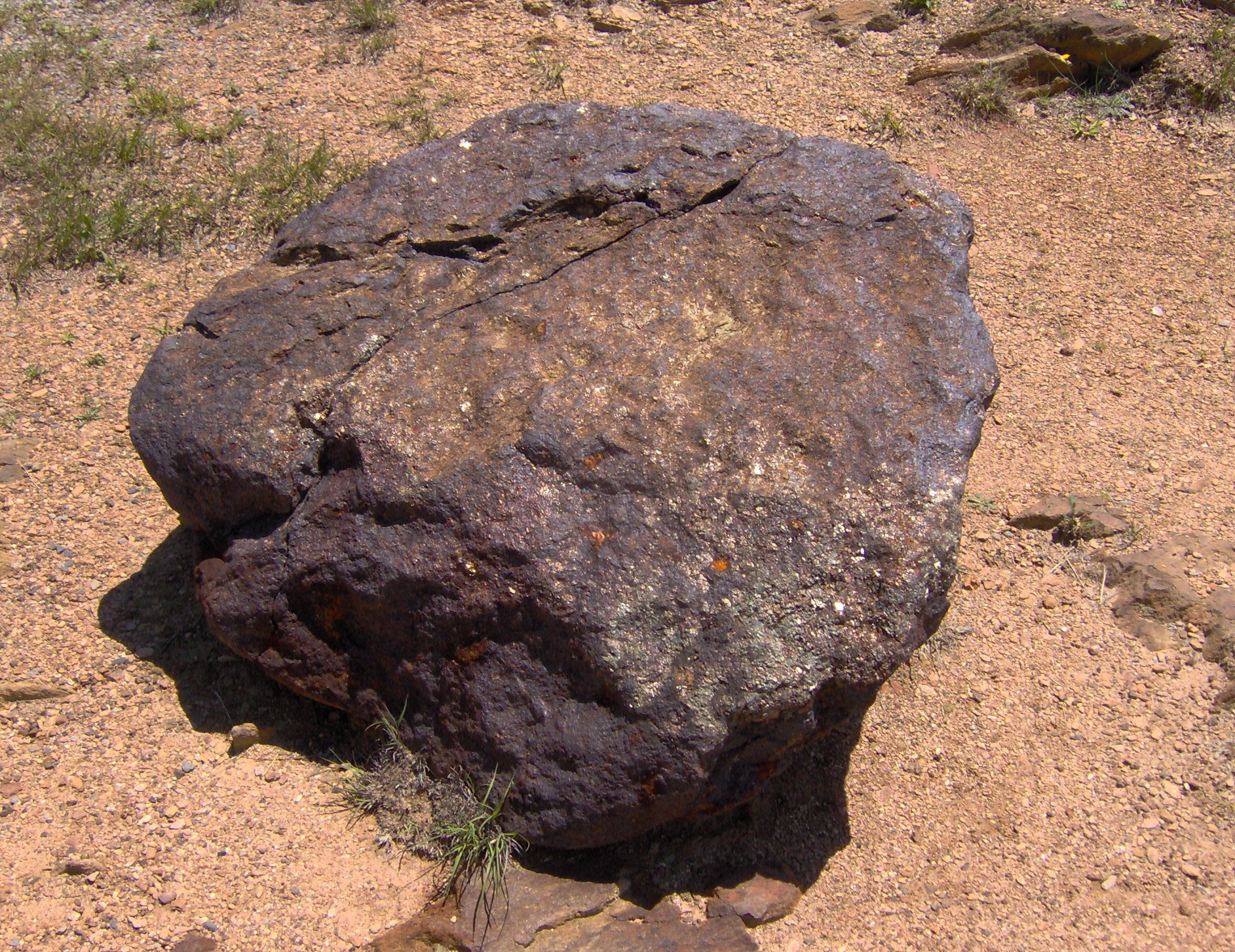
Copper ore

The Copper Basin is located in a broad valley in the Blue Ridge Mountains, part of the southern Appalachian Mountains near the borders of Tennessee, North Carolina, and Georgia. The basin, actually an area of low hills rather than a true basin, is surrounded on all sides by mountains, including Pack Mountain to the east, Stansbury Mountain to the north, Little Frog Mountain to the northwest, and Big Frog Mountain to the southwest, some more than 4,000 feet (1,200 m) above sea level. A series of hills rise above the basin to the south. The basin has an average elevation of 1,650 feet (500 m) above sea level.

The Ocoee River flows through the southwestern section of the Copper Basin, entering from Georgia, where it is known as the Toccoa, and exiting via a scenic gorge between Big Frog Mountain and Little Frog Mountain to the west. The river's Copper Basin segment is located at just over 35 miles (56 km) upstream from the river's mouth along the Hiwassee River near Benton, Tennessee. The Tennessee Valley Authority's Ocoee Dam Number 3 created a reservoir that extends into the Copper Basin.

Ducktown is located in the center of the Copper Basin near the juncture of Tennessee State Route 68 and U.S. Route 64. The city of Copperhill is located on the southern portion of the basin near the Tennessee-Georgia border and directly borders McCaysville, Georgia. Other communities include Postelle in the northwest section of the basin, Isabella in the eastern portion, and Harbuck, Turtletown, and Farner just north of the basin. The Copper Basin is also included in the Cleveland, Tennessee, metropolitan area.

Most of the rocks in the Copper Basin are metamorphic rocks deposited during the Lower Cambrian period but also include some igneous rocks. The metamorphic rocks are part of the Great Smoky formation. About two thirds of this metamorphic rock is greywacke, and it is also made up of arkose, conglomerate, greywacke conglomerate, schist, mica schist, garnet schist, slate, and staurolite. The igneous rock consists predominantly of gabbro. The first copper ores were deposited during the Ordovician period, when igneous rocks were advancing into the area. During this time, limestone in the area was metamorphosed into marble. Additional ore was formed after the end of the Carboniferous period. The rocks in the Copper Basin are some of the oldest rocks that were deposited during the Paleozoic era. The copper is located in three paralleling veins within the basin.

== Mining history ==
=== Pre-mining period ===
The Copper Basin was officially part of Cherokee lands until 1836, when the Cherokee relinquished control of the basin to the U.S. government through the Treaty of New Echota. The Cherokee were recorded to have inhabited the basin until the late 18th century. The Cherokee village of Kawa'na, which translates into "Duck Town" in English, is believed to have been located on the Ocoee River in the basin and was documented in Cherokee annuity distribution rolls in 1799. The village is believed to have been named after a Cherokee chief named Duck, although this has never been confirmed. Copper from the basin was reportedly used by the Cherokee on a limited basis. The basin became part of the Ocoee District, which mostly consisted of what is now Polk County. While most Cherokees in the area were forced out as part of the Cherokee removal of 1838, some managed to avoid detection and would later aid in road construction and mining operations.

=== Early mining history ===
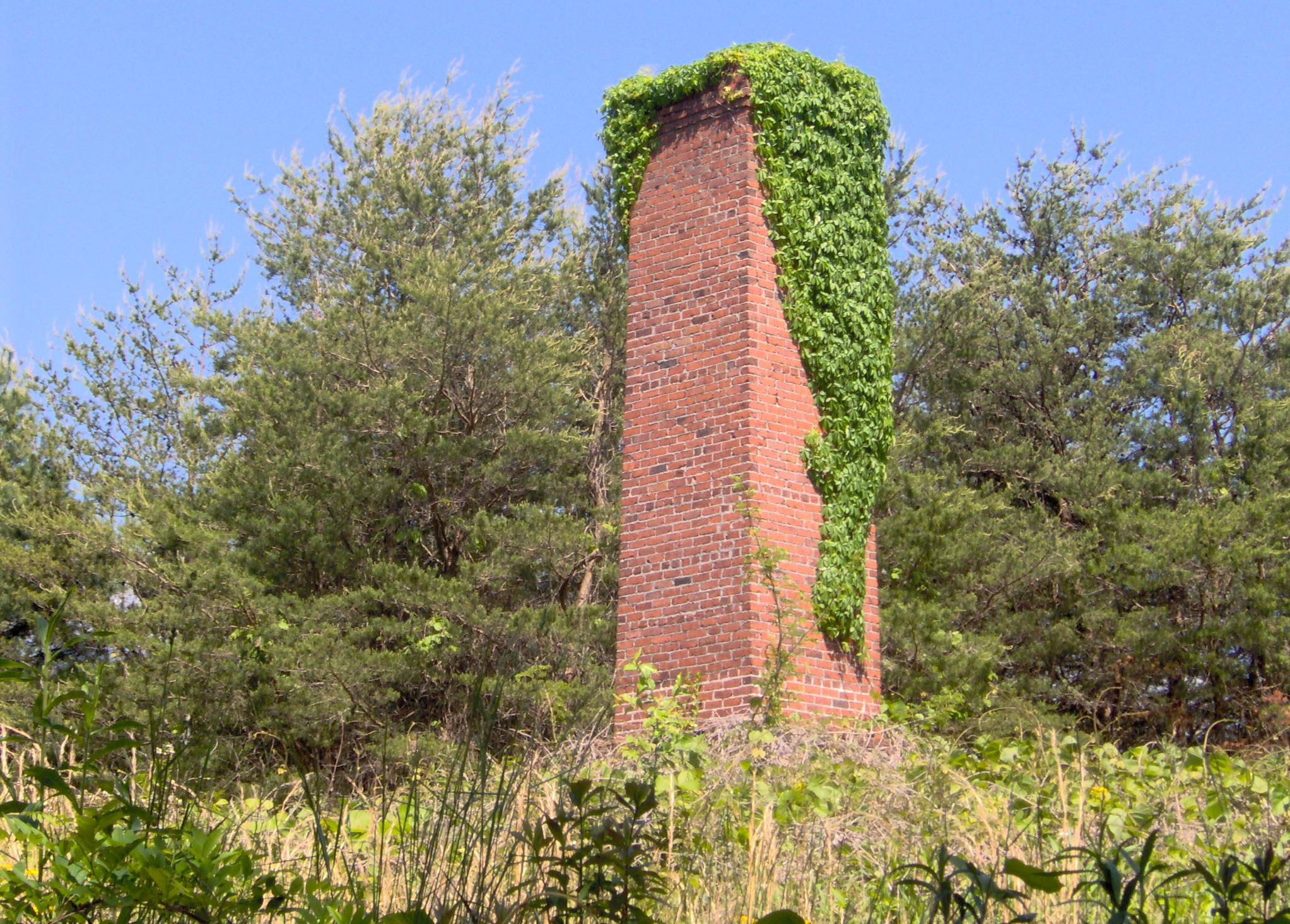
Boiler chimney marking the location where copper was first discovered in the Copper Basin in 1843

Copper was first discovered by a European American in the Copper Basin in August 1843 in a creek southwest of what would eventually become the Burra Burra Mine by a prospector who was reportedly panning for gold. This discovery sparked interest among regional entrepreneurs and opportunists, although the lack of major roads in and out of the basin complicated early mining operations. The first mining operations began in 1847, and that same year the first shipment of copper out of the basin took place. This consisted of 90 casks shipped by mule to Dalton, Georgia, about 70 miles (110 km) away, where the nearest railroad was located at that time. The first purchase of land in the Copper Basin for mining activities occurred in 1849 when a British agent bought 400 acres (160 ha) for a price of $30,000 (equivalent to $892,038 in 2025). The Hiwassee Mine, the first deep underground mine in the basin, was opened in 1850.

In 1851, work began on a road through the Ocoee Gorge to connect the Copper Basin with the East Tennessee and Georgia Railroad in Cleveland, Tennessee to the west, which had been completed that same year. This road, which became known as the Old Copper Road, was completed in 1853, and is now part of U.S. Route 64. The first smelter was constructed onsite in 1854, and began operations two years later. This was done in an effort to reduce transportation costs. By 1857, four additional mines, the Tennessee, Mary's, Isabella, and Eureka were in operation in the Copper Basin. In 1858 three companies, the Union Consolidated Mining Company, the Burra Burra Copper Company, and the Ducktown Copper Company, were formed to operate different mines in the basin and consolidate the small companies that operated these mines. A total of nine separate ore deposits were discovered and worked within the basin. In 1860, several additional small-scale mining operations in the basin were consolidated into the Burra Burra Copper Company, which was placed under the direction of mining engineer Julius Raht. In 1861 a rolling mill was constructed in Cleveland to process copper ore. This early mining was accomplished with the use of picks and shovels, and mules were used transport copper ore out of the mines in carts. Mules and oxen were also used to power whims, which were used to raise the ore out of the mines.

At the beginning of the American Civil War, most of the shareholders of the mines were Unionists, who closed the mines and fled the area. In January 1862 the Confederacy seized control of the mines, halting private operations, and began using the copper from the basin solely to produce weapons for the war effort. Shares from the Burra Burra Copper Company and the Union Consolidated Mining Company were then sold at public auctions to Confederate sympathizers. By 1863 mining operations had largely ceased in the basin, partially because many of the miners had joined the Confederate army. Between November 25 and 27, 1863, during the Chattanooga campaign, Union cavalrymen led by Colonel Eli Long raided Cleveland, destroying portions of the railroad and the copper rolling mill. This raid, as well as the Confederate defeat at the Battle of Missionary Ridge in Chattanooga, resulted in restoration of the mines to Union control. This proved a major blow to the Confederate war effort, as about 90% of their copper came from the Copper Basin.

Mining operations resumed shortly after the war ended, and in 1866, Raht, who had fled to Cincinnati during the war, reopened the mines. Refining operations began in the Copper Basin in 1871. Steam engines were first used in the mining operations during this time, making the mines more productive. Between 1866 and 1878, the mines produced 24 million pounds (11×10^{6} kg) of copper ore. By the late 1870s, however, the mines, lacking a cost-effective method of transporting the ore out of the basin, were forced out of business. As a result, the last mines were idle by 1879.

=== Expansion of mining operations ===
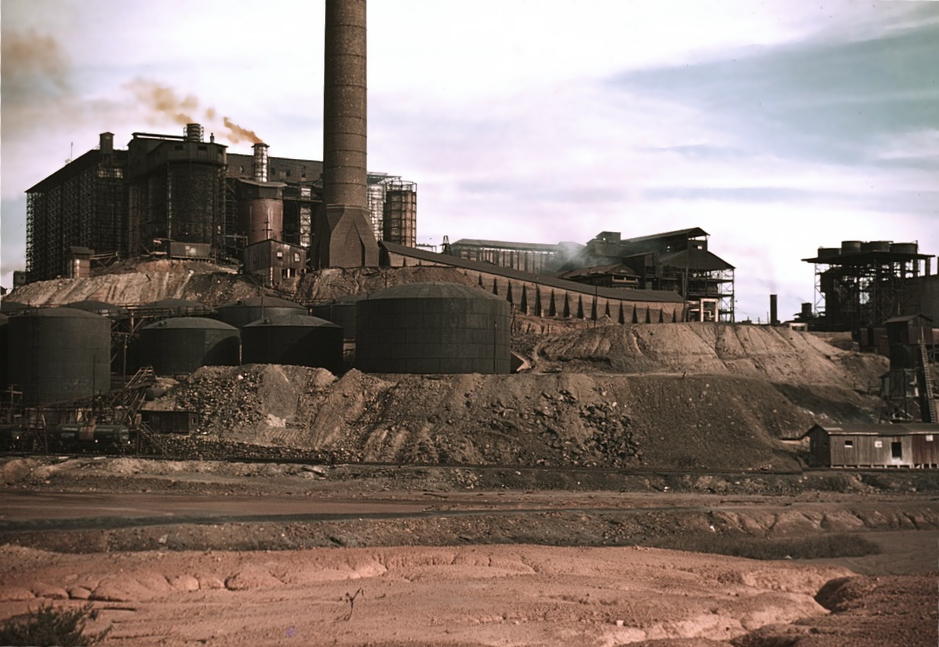
Copper mine and sulfuric acid plant in Copperhill, 1939

In the summer of 1889, the Marietta & North Georgia Railroad and the Knoxville Southern Railroad built a rail line connecting the Copper Basin to Knoxville to the north and Marietta, Georgia to the south, and mining operations resumed the following year. A railroad station was constructed in McCay's, and the name was changed to Copperhill in 1908. The London-based Ducktown Sulphur, Copper and Iron Company (DCS&I) reopened the Mary Mine in 1890, and the following year the open-roast heap smelting process was first used in the basin. In 1899, the Tennessee Copper Company, which had been founded earlier that year and had purchased most of the mining operations in the Copper Basin, constructed a smelter at Copperhill and began work on the Burra Burra Mine at Ducktown. This mine would eventually become the most productive mine in the basin. The company's open roast smelting method released large amounts of sulfur dioxide into the air, killing off all vegetation in the Copper Basin region. After being sued by local farmers and the state of Georgia over damage caused by the pollution, the Tennessee Copper Company began to recapture the sulfur dioxide in 1907 and convert it into sulfuric acid, which they successfully marketed.

Despite the revival of the mining industry, many problems ensued. Beginning in September 1899 several employees of the DCS&I, which had a policy of not employing unionized members, formed a strike after the company fired workers who had formed the Copper Mine Workers Union. After the intervention of law enforcement, the strike was settled three months later when the DCS&I reaffirmed their policy of not hiring union members.

The Tennessee Copper Company eventually merged with the DCS&I, and the merged company began to diversify. Along with copper and sulfuric acid, the company built a flotation plant to produce copper sulfate in the 1920s. Iron and zinc concentrates were also produced. The DCS&I was reorganized into the Ducktown Chemical and Iron Company (DC&I) in 1925. In 1936, TCC took over the DC&I, and by this time the cities of Ducktown and Copperhill were mostly company towns. J.N. Houser, the head of the TCC at this time, further expanded the products produced in the basin and allowed the employees to unionize.

In 1937, during a dispute between the three unions representing the miners, the TCC employees were essentially divided when two of the unions joined the American Federation of Labor (AFL), and the other, the International Union of Mine, Mill and Smelter Workers (IUMMSW), joined the Congress of Industrial Organizations (CIO). The unions fought for control of the entire company, and two subsequent elections were held by the National Labor Relations Board. The first election was won by the AFL but was dismissed after allegations of mismanagement and election fraud. The second election was won by the CIO, but this failed to resolve the dispute. As a result, a strike, organized by the IUMMSW, began on July 14, 1939. The strike mostly ended in late August when the TCC reopened the mines and the NLRB rejected a petition by the AFL for a third vote. Members of the IUMMSW gradually returned to work, but continued to demand that the TCC join the IUMMSW, and the conflict continued. On April 1, 14, and 24, 1940, a total of six explosions, perpetrated by striking miners, damaged three separate transmission lines operated by the Tennessee Valley Authority (TVA) that supplied power to the basin, briefly cutting power to the basin and forcing the closure of the mines. The following year eight members of the IUMMSW were convicted in federal court for conspiracy against the United States for this, which was subsequently upheld by the United States Court of Appeals for the Sixth Circuit. This conviction was overturned by the U.S. Supreme Court in 1943. The strike officially lasted until May 5, 1940, when members of the IUMMSW agreed at a meeting to end the strike.

On January 5, 1943, an explosion in the Boyd Mine killed 9, injured 11, and left 34 workers trapped for several hours. The explosion was the result of a detonation of dust and sulfur fumes in the mine that had been dispersed by a routine blasting operation. The explosion stopped a ventilation fan which brought fresh air into the mine, resulting in a reversal of the air current. As a result, the cause of death of the eight miners killed initially was a combination of asphyxia and dust inhalation, and 17 of the survivors were treated for symptoms caused by these same conditions. The survivors who were trapped were able to open a compressed air line that provided an adequate supply of oxygen until they were rescued. This was the worst mining-related accident to occur in the Copper Basin. Despite this, the mines in the Copper Basin had a much better safety record than most mining operations, with very few deadly accidents occurring.

RPPC The Smelter, Copperhill, Tennessee circa 1930s

=== Later years ===
World War II brought a brief increase in demand for products from the Copper Basin. A sulfuric acid plant was constructed in Copperhill in 1942, and by 1949 liquid sulfuric acid was being produced. Faced with decreasing demand and increasing foreign competition, however, the mining industry began to decline in the Copper Basin in the 1950s. The Burra Burra mine, which had grown into the largest mine, closed in 1958. In 1960 the Central Mine, the last major mine in the Copper Basin, began operation. The Tennessee Copper Company was purchased by Cities Services Corporation in 1963. A strike in 1969 resulted in an eight percent pay increase for employees and an increase in paid benefits. During the Vietnam War, sulfuric acid produced in the Copper Basin was supplied to the Volunteer Army Ammunition Plant in Chattanooga. At the beginning of the 1970s, the company announced plans to expand but faced financial problems into the decade. Two strikes, in 1974 and 1977, the latter of which lasted four months, also led to the decline in mining activities in the basin, as well as anger and division amongst locals, especially those who did not support the strikes. The Tennessee Copper Company was purchased by a group of investors in September 1982, and the name was changed to the Tennessee Chemical Company. The Tennessee Chemical Company immediately began contesting its property tax requirements, which resulted in Polk County laying off 20% of its government employees, resulting in further turmoil amongst local residents.

The company announced plans to shut down all mining operations in January 1985, and the final mine closed on August 27, 1987. The Tennessee Chemical Company filed for bankruptcy in 1989. The sulfuric acid plant continued to operate until 2000, with raw materials acquired elsewhere.

== Environmental issues and remediation ==
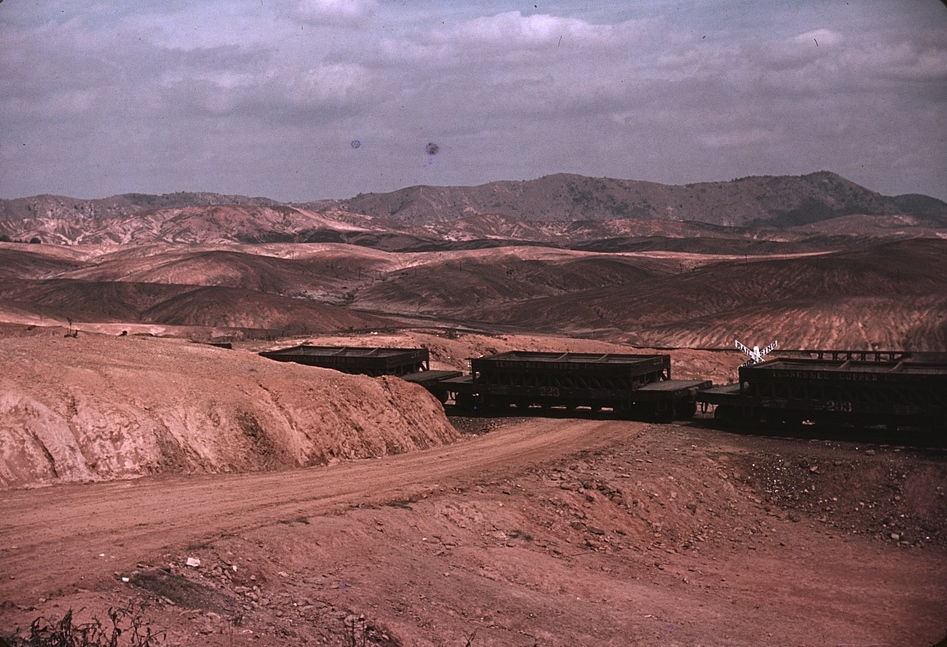
The Copper Basin in 1939

In the early years of the mining operations, the forests in the Copper Basin were logged to fuel the smelters. As early as 1861 trees were becoming scarce, and in 1876 the companies began importing logs from Fannin County, Georgia. The smelting process released sulfur dioxide gas, which reacted with water vapor in the atmosphere, forming sulfuric acid and precipitating as acid rain. This subsequently killed the majority of the vegetation in the basin, and surface runoff into the Ocoee River and surrounding tributaries killed most aquatic life. This also resulted in erosion of the topsoil, much of which ended up in the Ocoee. The reddish-brown landscape that resulted, which consisted mostly of iron and copper ore, was often compared to a desert and the surface of Mars and was distinctly visible from space. A total of 32,000 acres were affected.

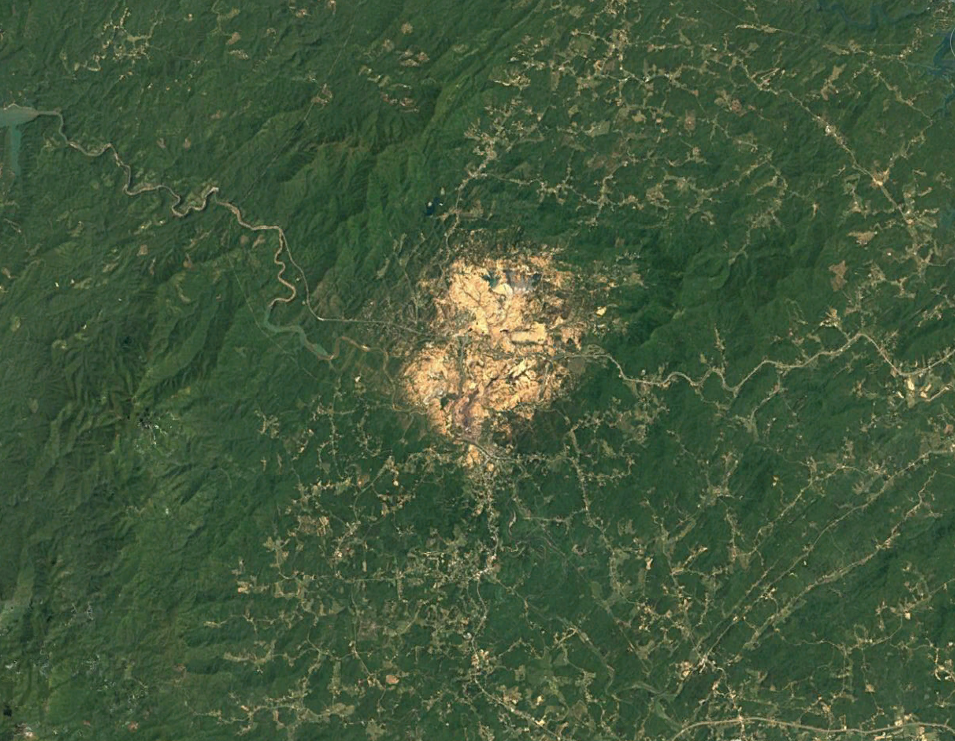
Satellite image showing the Copper Basin in 1984

The state of Georgia began suing the Tennessee Copper Company in the mid-1880s, claiming that the mining operations were causing damage to forests and crops in northern Georgia. In 1904, smokestacks were constructed to disperse the pollution; this, however, only worsened the problem. That same year, in Madison v. Ducktown Sulphur, Copper & Iron Company, the Tennessee Supreme Court reversed an injunction that would have forced a cessation of the mining operations until the pollution was mitigated. The lawsuits culminated in 1907, when the U.S. Supreme Court ruled in Georgia v. Tennessee Copper Company that the state of Georgia could order the Tennessee Copper Company, via injunction, to mitigate the pollution from the mining activities. The following year, facilities were constructed to condense the fumes into sulfuric acid, and as a result, this injunction was never enforced. Two 1910 Supreme Court cases were related to this injunction, Wetmore v. Tennessee Copper Co. and Ladew v. Tennessee Copper Co. In both of these cases, the court held that jurisdiction on the part of the plaintiffs was improper, as they were not residents of the circuit court's jurisdiction.

Reforestation and reclamation efforts in the Copper Basin began in the 1930s. In 1939, the Tennessee Valley Authority and the Tennessee Copper Company began a joint effort to plant replacement trees, and the soil was treated with lime to remove the acidity. A Civilian Conservation Corps camp was established in the basin in 1941 to aid in the reforestation efforts. By the 2000s, the area had been mostly reclaimed.

== Recent history ==
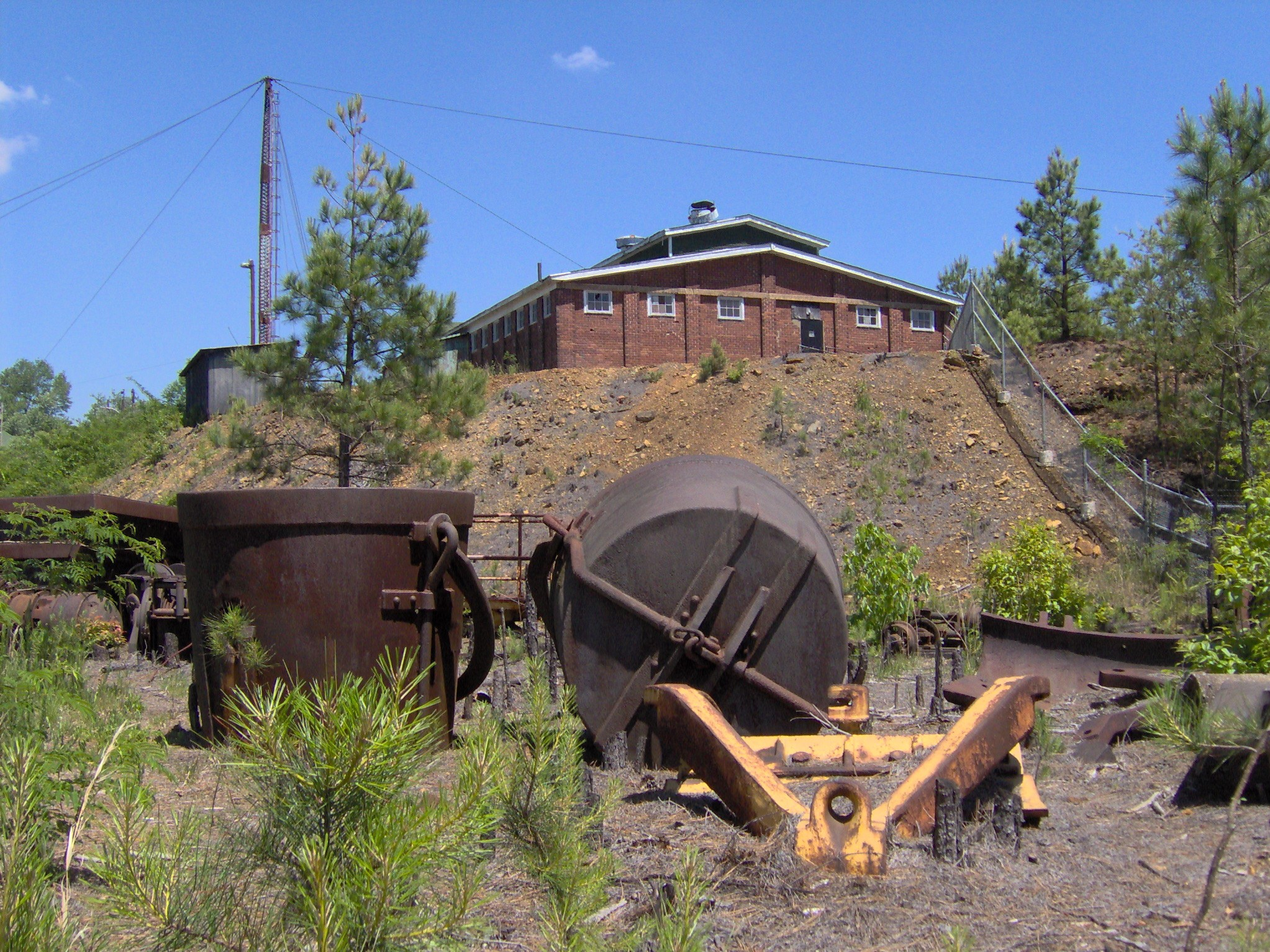
Mining machine parts and tools scattered about the Burra Burra Mine site

The Ducktown Basin Museum was established in 1978 by a group of local citizens intent on preserving the legacy of the Copper Basin. The museum was moved to the building that formerly housed the headquarters of the Tennessee Copper Company at the Burra Burra Mine in 1982. It features exhibits on the history of the mining operations in the basin and the geology of the area, as well as artifacts from the mining activities.

The Burra Burra Mine was listed on the National Register of Historic Places in 1983. Many of the structures from the mining operations still remain. The basin was the site of a large flood in 1990 that inundated most of the business districts of Copperhill and McCaysville, resulting in a years-long legal battle between the two cities and forcing Copperhill into bankruptcy.

== See also ==
- Geology of Tennessee
- Copper mining in the United States
- National Register of Historic Places listings in Polk County, Tennessee

== Bibliography ==
- Barclay, R.E. (1946). Ducktown: Back in Raht's Time. Chapel Hill, North Carolina: University of North Carolina Press. ISBN 0807868493.
- Brooks, Jeanne M. (April 17, 1990). Polk County: An Appalachian Perspective (Thesis). University of Tennessee Honors Thesis Projects.
- Dubé, Tom; Otteman, Ruth (March 2008). History of Tennessee Copper Company and Successor Firms at the Copperhill Plant and the Ducktown Mining District (Report). Science Applications International Corporation. 06-5124-04-2241-180 – via U.S. Army Corps of Engineers Digital Library.
- Emmons, William H.; Laney, F.B. (1926). Geology and Ore Deposits of the Ducktown Mining District, Tennessee (PDF) (Report). U.S. Geologic Survey.
- Frye, Harriet (2017). Tennessee's Great Copper Basin. Charleston, South Carolina: Arcadia Publishing. ISBN 978-1540216342 – via Google Books.
- Maysilles, Duncan (May 30, 2011). Ducktown Smoke: The Fight over One of the South's Greatest Environmental Disasters. Chapel Hill, North Carolina: University of North Carolina Press. ISBN 978-0-8078-7793-7 – via Google Books.
- Ross, Clarence Samuel (1935). Origin of the Copper Deposits of the Ducktown Type in the Southern Appalachian Region (Report). U.S. Geological Survey – via Google Books.
