= Copperhill, Tennessee =

- City
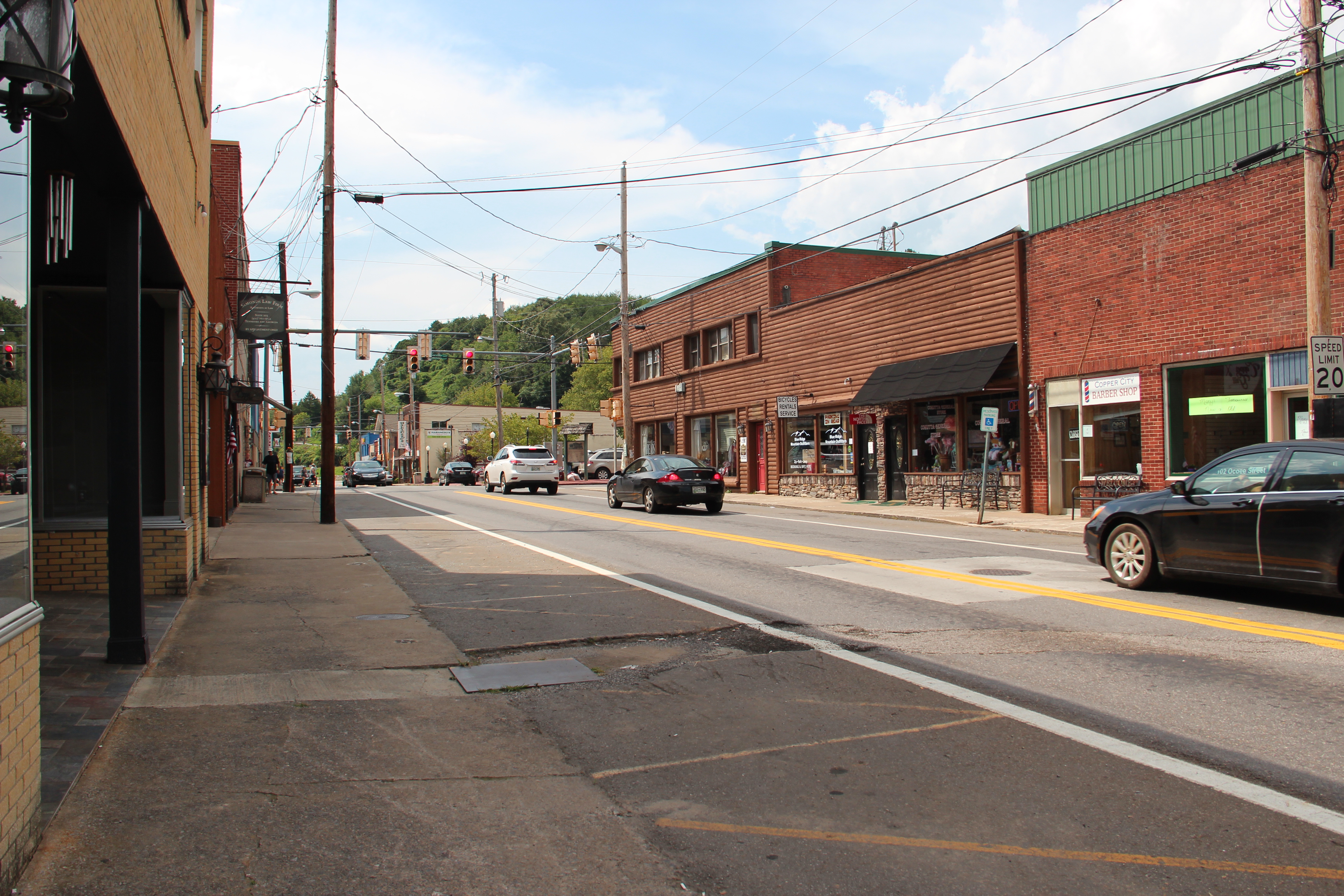
- Downtown Copperhill

- Location of Copperhill in Polk County, Tennessee.
- Coordinates: 34°59′32″N 84°22′27″W
- Country: United States
- State: Tennessee
- County: Polk
- Founded: 1890
- Incorporated: 1913

Area
  - Total: 1.80 sq mi (4.67 km^{2})
  - Land: 1.77 sq mi (4.58 km^{2})
  - Water: 0.031 sq mi (0.08 km^{2})
- Elevation: 1,470 ft (448 m)

Population (2020)
  - Total: 443
  - Density: 250.4/sq mi (96.67/km^{2})
- Time zone: UTC-5 (Eastern (EST))
  - Summer (DST): UTC-4 (EDT)
- ZIP code: 37317
- Area code: 423
- FIPS code: 47-17000
- GNIS feature ID: 1281278
- Website: https://copperhill.gov/

Copperhill is a city in Polk County, Tennessee, United States. The population was 443 at the 2020 census. It is included in the Cleveland Metropolitan Statistical Area.

== History ==
Copperhill is located in a geological region known as the Copper Basin, which was the site of a major copper mining operation between the 1840s and 1987. According to the original border surveying plan, Copperhill (and Ducktown, Tennessee) would have been in North Carolina. In 1819, surveyors were instructed to follow the highest ridges to the Georgia state line. However, at Unicoi Gap surveyors immediately turned south for 15 miles, reportedly because they ran out of liquor and heard there was a moonshine still at the Georgia border.

Starting around the time of the Civil War, the production method for removing the Sulphur from the copper ore mined in the area required building bonfires, throwing in the ore, and burning off the Sulphur. This necessitated cutting most of the trees in the valley for the bonfires. The acid rain caused by the burning of the Sulphur inhibited additional vegetation from growing, and the topsoil consequently washed off the hilly terrain due to lack of vegetation to hold it. Though acid plants were later built to convert the Sulphur into a useful product, the result of the earlier activities was that for years, up until the 1980s, the area was denuded of any greenery, and the red clay soil remaining gave it a Martian appearance. The area has now been greatly reforested, due to a multimillion-dollar effort by the successor companies to the original copper company. The copper and acid plants have been permanently closed and most of the plant infrastructure already removed and sold overseas. Much of the scrap metals from the site have been removed and sold to China. Glenn Springs Holdings has cleaned and purified all the surrounding creeks and waterways, and water quality is now back to near pristine condition according to published EPA and Tennessee Department of Environmental Conservation studies.

The town was originally known as McCays since it is directly across a river from McCaysville, Georgia. When the L&N Railroad combined the two train stations, the new depot was dubbed "Copper Hill." City officials then changed the name of McCays to Copperhill in 1911.

The town these days is a tourist attraction, with near-daily rail excursions from Blue Ridge, Georgia, on the Blue Ridge Scenic Railway, and near-daily rail excursions from The Gee Creek Wilderness on the Hiwassee River train route. Whitewater rafting on the Ocoee River also attracts many people and other outdoor activities such as Mountain Biking and Hiking are also popular in the area. The area was the host for the whitewater portion of the 1996 Summer Olympics.

On February 16, 1990, flooding of the river submerged much of the central business district of Copperhill and McCaysville. The river flooded again early on November 5, 2026, cresting just higher than the 1990 level, after very heavy rainfall near Blue Ridge, Georgia. Once again, much of the business district was submerged, with numerous businesses sustaining heavy damage. Numerous water rescues took place along the river in both Fannin and Polk counties, including at least 68 in Polk County alone.

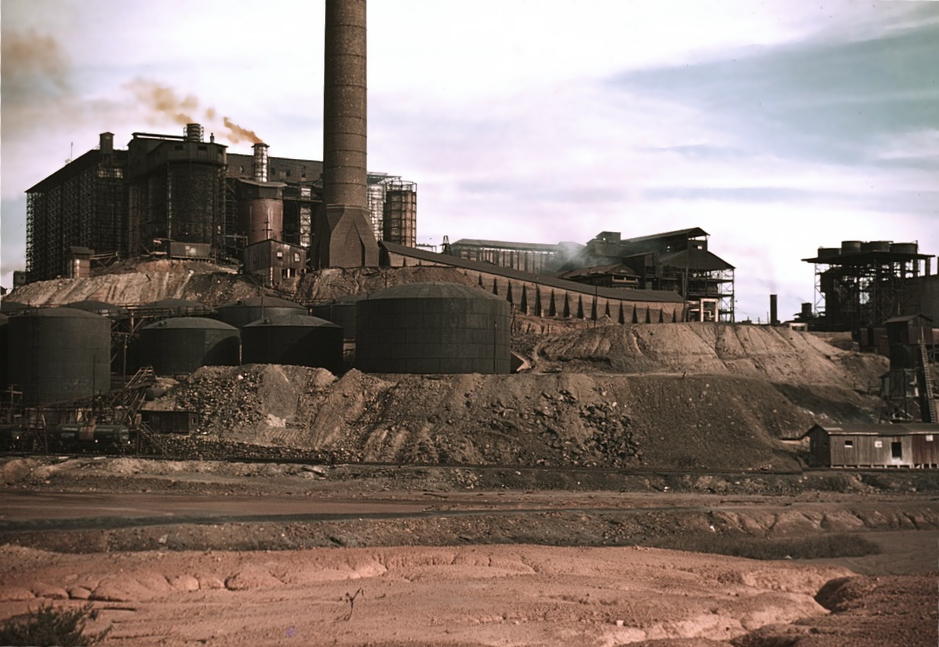
Copper mine and sulfuric acid plant, Copperhill, 1939

== Geography ==
Copperhill is located at 34°59′32″N 84°22′27″W (34.992108, -84.374254), situated in extreme southeast Tennessee, bordering North Georgia.

Its twin city is McCaysville, Georgia, with the two situated as a single town aligned along a northwestward-flowing river, known as the Toccoa River in Georgia, and the Ocoee River in Tennessee, rather than the east/west state line, which cuts diagonally across streets (where it is marked with a blue line) and through buildings. There is a main downtown area, which the town shares with McCaysville, and it retains a historic feel of when it was thriving. The main street through town is Ocoee Street (Tennessee State Route 68) which becomes Toccoa Street (Georgia State Route 60) to the east-southeast in McCaysville. A truss bridge over the river at the state line links them to Blue Ridge Drive (Georgia 5) to the south-southwest.

In the early morning hours of February 16, 1990, a major flood struck the towns, although it is now hard to see any damage from this flooding. The upstream Blue Ridge Dam was raised several feet by the Tennessee Valley Authority, thus greatly minimizing any potential future possible occurrence of flooding. There have been no further incidents with the river flooding.

As a result of the state line, homes and businesses on the Copperhill side of town have area code 423, while those on the McCaysville side have area code 706.

According to the United States Census Bureau, the city has a total area of 1.9 square miles (4.9 km^{2}), of which 1.9 square miles (4.9 km^{2}) is land and 0.04 square miles (0.10 km^{2}) (2.08%) is water.

== Demographics ==
Historical population
Census	Pop.	Note	%±
1920	1,102		—
1930	1,050		−4.7%
1940	1,005		−4.3%
1950	924		−8.1%
1960	638		−31.0%
1970	563		−11.8%
1980	418		−25.8%
1990	362		−13.4%
2000	511		41.2%
2010	354		−30.7%
2020	443		25.1%

=== 2020 census ===
As of the 2020 census, Copperhill had a population of 443, with 212 households that included 97 families. The median age was 47.2 years, 14.4% of residents were under the age of 18, and 23.9% were 65 years of age or older. For every 100 females there were 100.5 males, and for every 100 females age 18 and over there were 99.5 males age 18 and over.

0.0% of residents lived in urban areas, while 100.0% lived in rural areas.

There were 212 households in Copperhill, of which 24.1% had children under the age of 18 living in them. Of all households, 24.5% were married-couple households, 28.8% were households with a male householder and no spouse or partner present, and 36.8% were households with a female householder and no spouse or partner present. About 40.6% of all households were made up of individuals and 18.4% had someone living alone who was 65 years of age or older.

There were 289 housing units, of which 26.6% were vacant. The homeowner vacancy rate was 3.8% and the rental vacancy rate was 12.1%.

Racial composition as of the 2020 census
Race	Number	Percent
White	388	87.6%
Black or African American	2	0.5%
American Indian and Alaska Native	1	0.2%
Asian	1	0.2%
Native Hawaiian and Other Pacific Islander	0	0.0%
Some other race	28	6.3%
Two or more races	23	5.2%
Hispanic or Latino (of any race)	39	8.8%

=== 2000 census ===
As of the census of 2000, there was a population of 511, with 239 households and 146 families residing in the city. The population density was 271.9 inhabitants per square mile (105.0/km^{2}). There were 274 housing units at an average density of 145.8 per square mile (56.3/km^{2}). The racial makeup of the city was 97.46% White, 0.20% Native American, and 2.35% from two or more races. Hispanic or Latino of any race were 0.98% of the population.

There were 239 households, out of which 20.9% had children under the age of 18 living with them, 46.4% were married couples living together, 10.5% had a female householder with no husband present, and 38.5% were non-families. 34.7% of all households were made up of individuals, and 18.4% had someone living alone who was 65 years of age or older. The average household size was 2.14 and the average family size was 2.73.

In the city, the population was spread out, with 18.2% under the age of 18, 8.4% from 18 to 24, 23.7% from 25 to 44, 29.4% from 45 to 64, and 20.4% who were 65 years of age or older. The median age was 44 years. For every 100 females, there were 79.3 males. For every 100 females age 18 and over, there were 79.4 males.

The median income for a household in the city was $25,313, and the median income for a family was $28,365. Males had a median income of $23,125 versus $18,542 for females. The per capita income for the city was $15,677. About 8.7% of families and 10.7% of the population were below the poverty line, including 5.3% of those under age 18 and 14.7% of those age 65 or over.

== Climate ==
The climate in this area is characterized by hot, humid summers and generally mild to cool winters. According to the Köppen Climate Classification system, Copperhill has a humid subtropical climate, abbreviated "Cfa" on climate maps.

Climate data for Murphy 4ESE, North Carolina (1991–2020 normals, extremes 1873–present)
Month	Jan	Feb	Mar	Apr	May	Jun	Jul	Aug	Sep	Oct	Nov	Dec	Year
Record high °F (°C)	76 (24)	81 (27)	88 (31)	92 (33)	91 (33)	98 (37)	100 (38)	99 (37)	96 (36)	93 (34)	84 (29)	77 (25)	100 (38)
Mean maximum °F (°C)	67.1 (19.5)	71.3 (21.8)	77.9 (25.5)	84.7 (29.3)	87.0 (30.6)	90.7 (32.6)	92.5 (33.6)	92.1 (33.4)	89.5 (31.9)	83.0 (28.3)	76.5 (24.7)	68.0 (20.0)	93.8 (34.3)
Mean daily maximum °F (°C)	49.8 (9.9)	53.5 (11.9)	61.6 (16.4)	70.8 (21.6)	77.5 (25.3)	83.5 (28.6)	86.6 (30.3)	86.0 (30.0)	81.3 (27.4)	71.8 (22.1)	61.4 (16.3)	52.7 (11.5)	69.7 (20.9)
Daily mean °F (°C)	37.5 (3.1)	40.8 (4.9)	47.7 (8.7)	56.0 (13.3)	64.1 (17.8)	71.3 (21.8)	74.9 (23.8)	74.2 (23.4)	68.6 (20.3)	57.5 (14.2)	47.1 (8.4)	40.5 (4.7)	56.7 (13.7)
Mean daily minimum °F (°C)	25.3 (−3.7)	28.0 (−2.2)	33.8 (1.0)	41.2 (5.1)	50.7 (10.4)	59.2 (15.1)	63.2 (17.3)	62.3 (16.8)	55.8 (13.2)	43.3 (6.3)	32.8 (0.4)	28.4 (−2.0)	43.7 (6.5)
Mean minimum °F (°C)	8.4 (−13.1)	13.4 (−10.3)	18.9 (−7.3)	27.2 (−2.7)	36.2 (2.3)	48.8 (9.3)	56.2 (13.4)	54.9 (12.7)	43.3 (6.3)	29.1 (−1.6)	19.8 (−6.8)	14.7 (−9.6)	5.7 (−14.6)
Record low °F (°C)	−16 (−27)	−4 (−20)	−3 (−19)	18 (−8)	25 (−4)	35 (2)	46 (8)	48 (9)	28 (−2)	21 (−6)	6 (−14)	−4 (−20)	−16 (−27)
Average precipitation inches (mm)	5.10 (130)	5.26 (134)	5.29 (134)	5.20 (132)	4.75 (121)	5.41 (137)	5.25 (133)	4.70 (119)	4.28 (109)	3.45 (88)	4.60 (117)	5.99 (152)	59.28 (1,506)
Average snowfall inches (cm)	0.8 (2.0)	1.5 (3.8)	0.1 (0.25)	0.0 (0.0)	0.0 (0.0)	0.0 (0.0)	0.0 (0.0)	0.0 (0.0)	0.0 (0.0)	0.0 (0.0)	0.1 (0.25)	1.9 (4.8)	4.4 (11)
Average precipitation days (≥ 0.01 in)	11.5	11.3	11.9	10.9	11.4	12.6	12.2	11.3	9.2	8.2	9.3	11.9	131.7
Average snowy days (≥ 0.1 in)	0.9	0.9	0.2	0.0	0.0	0.0	0.0	0.0	0.0	0.0	0.1	0.8	2.9
Source: NOAA

== See also ==
- Copper Basin (Tennessee)
- Burra Burra Mine (Tennessee)
