= Wetmore v. Tennessee Copper Co. =

Wetmore v. Tennessee Copper Company
- Supreme Court of the United States

Submitted October 11, 1910 Decided November 28, 1910
- Full case name: George Peabody Wetmore v. Tennessee Copper Company
- Citations: 218 U.S. 369 (more) 31 S. Ct. 84; 54 L. Ed. 1073

Holding
- A Circuit Court of the United States does not have jurisdiction over a suit where both plaintiff and defendant are an out of state citizens (except for out country citizens)

Court membership
- Chief Justice vacant Associate Justices John M. Harlan · Edward D. White; Joseph McKenna · Oliver W. Holmes Jr. William R. Day · Horace H. Lurton; Charles E. Hughes

Case opinion
- Majority: Harlan, joined by unanimous

Wetmore v. Tennessee Copper Company, 218 U.S. 369 (1910), was a United States Supreme Court case involving jurisdiction over a suit involving a wealthy landowner from Rhode Island, U.S. Senator George P. Wetmore, suing a New Jersey Corporation for emitting toxic fumes onto land he owned in Tennessee. The Court followed its precedent in Ladew v. Tennessee Copper Company, in asserting that jurisdiction was improper because neither party was a citizen in the jurisdiction of the Circuit court, but jurisdiction was proper over the foreign British corporation that was joined to the suit.
