= Ladew v. Tennessee Copper Co. =

Ladew v. Tennessee Copper Company
- Supreme Court of the United States

Argued October 19, 1910 Decided November 28, 1910
- Full case name: Harvey Ladew v. Tennessee Copper Company
- Citations: 218 U.S. 357 (more) 31 S. Ct. 81; 54 L. Ed. 1069

Holding
- A Circuit Court of the United States does not have jurisdiction over a suit where both plaintiff and defendant are an out of state citizens

Court membership
- Chief Justice vacant Associate Justices John M. Harlan · Edward D. White; Joseph McKenna · Oliver W. Holmes Jr. William R. Day · Horace H. Lurton; Charles E. Hughes

Case opinion
- Majority: Harlan, joined by unanimous

Ladew v. Tennessee Copper Company, 218 U.S. 357 (1910), was a United States Supreme Court case involving jurisdiction over a suit involving a citizen from another state beyond the Court's jurisdiction, suing a New Jersey Corporation, another out of state citizen. The Court asserted that under the statute jurisdiction was improper because neither party was a citizen in the jurisdiction of the Circuit Court. The Court followed the decision in Wetmore v. Tennessee Copper Company another case decided later that same year.
