= Ducktown, Tennessee =

- City
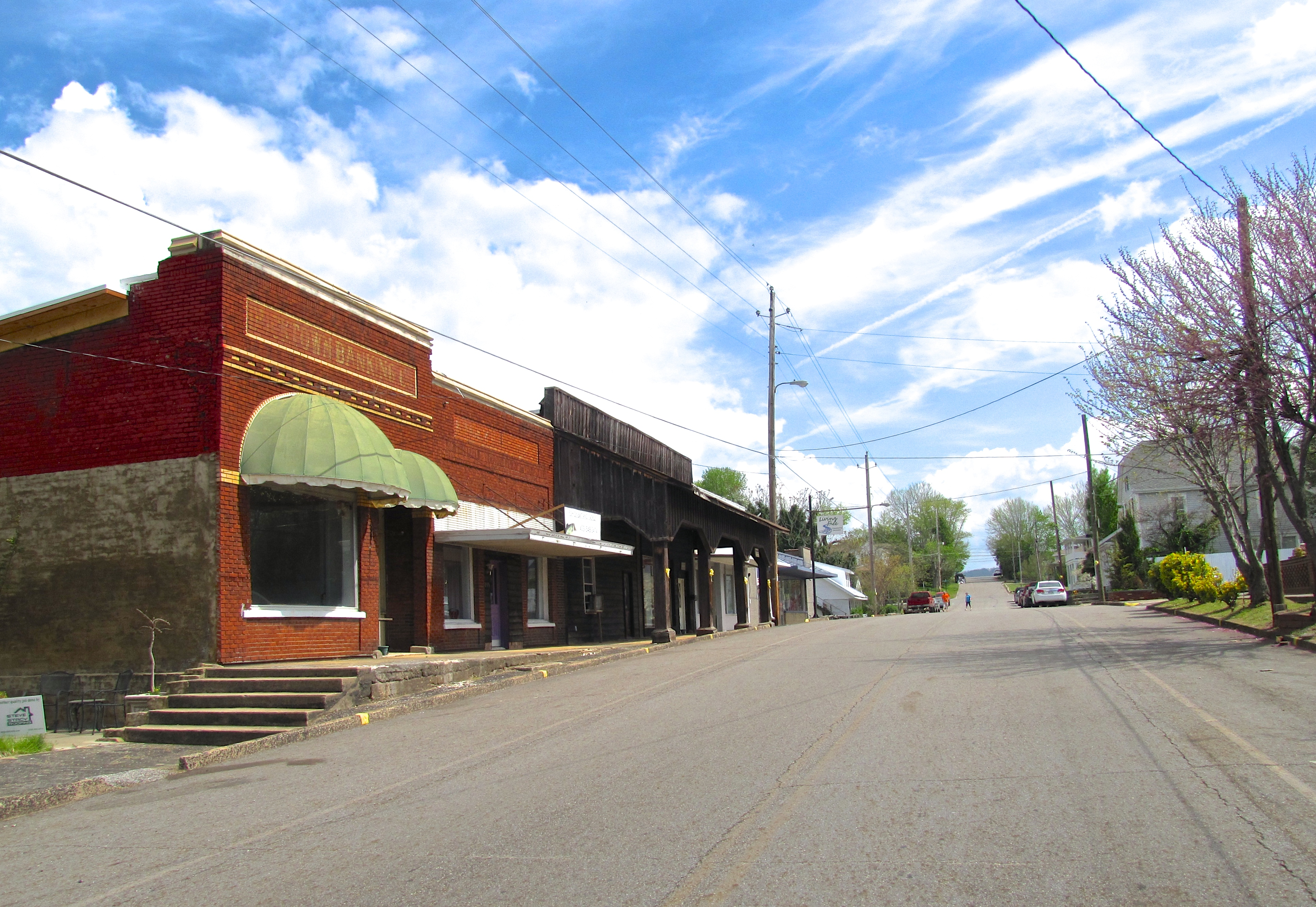
- Buildings along Main Street in Ducktown

- Location of Ducktown in Polk County, Tennessee.
- Coordinates: 35°2′3″N 84°23′3″W
- Country: United States
- State: Tennessee
- County: Polk
- Established: 1840s
- Incorporated: 1951
- Named for: Cherokee village at the site prior to settlement

Area
  - Total: 2.64 sq mi (6.84 km^{2})
  - Land: 2.64 sq mi (6.84 km^{2})
  - Water: 0 sq mi (0.00 km^{2})
- Elevation: 1,732 ft (528 m)

Population (2020)
  - Total: 461
  - Density: 174.5/sq mi (67.39/km^{2})
- Time zone: UTC-5 (Eastern (EST))
  - Summer (DST): UTC-4 (EDT)
- ZIP code: 37326
- Area code: 423
- FIPS code: 47-21740
- GNIS feature ID: 1283051
- Website: www.cityofducktown.com

Ducktown (Cherokee: ᎦᏬᏅᏱ, romanized: Gawonvyi) is a city in Polk County, Tennessee, United States. The population was 461 at the 2020 census and 475 at the 2010 census. It is included in the Cleveland, Tennessee metropolitan area.

== History ==
Ducktown is located in a geological region known as the Copper Basin, and was the center of a major copper-mining district from 1847 until 1987. The district also produced iron, sulfur and zinc as byproducts. Ducktown was the birthplace of Rockabilly Hall of Famer, Stan Beaver.

Literary historian Ben Harris McClary suggests that a Ducktown-area farmer named William "Sut" Miller (d. 1858) was the inspiration for the George Washington Harris character, Sut Lovingood. Ducktown and several Ducktown-area features, such as Big Frog Mountain and the Ocoee River ("Oconee"), are mentioned in the Sut Lovingood tales.

=== Pre-mining period ===
The Cherokee inhabited the Copper Basin as early as the late 18th century, well before the arrival of the first Euro-American settlers. Their territory extended into northern Georgia. The Cherokee village of Gawonvyi (also known as Kawana)— which means “duck place” in English— is believed to have been located at the confluence of the Ocoee River and Tumbling Creek. The village's name was recorded on Cherokee annuity distribution rolls as "Ducktown" in 1799. According to tradition, Ducktown was named after a Cherokee leader named Chief Duck.

According to the original border surveying plan, Ducktown (and Copperhill, Tennessee) would have been in North Carolina. In 1819, surveyors were instructed to follow the highest ridges to the Georgia line. However, at Unicoi Gap surveyors immediately turned south for 15 miles, reportedly because they ran out of liquor and heard there was a moonshine still at the Georgia line.

In 1836, the Cherokee relinquished control of the Copper Basin to the U.S. government as part of lands they ceded in Tennessee and Georgia in the Treaty of New Echota. Although the U.S. removed many of the basin's Cherokee inhabitants in the march to Indian Territory, some avoided the roundup by hiding out in the surrounding mountains. They would later help build the Old Copper Road (now part of US U.S. Route 64). In the 1840s and 1850s, Ducktown was called Hiwassee or Hiawassee, after the Cherokee name for a major river in the area. This name was subsequently adopted for the city's first major mining operation.

=== Early mining years ===
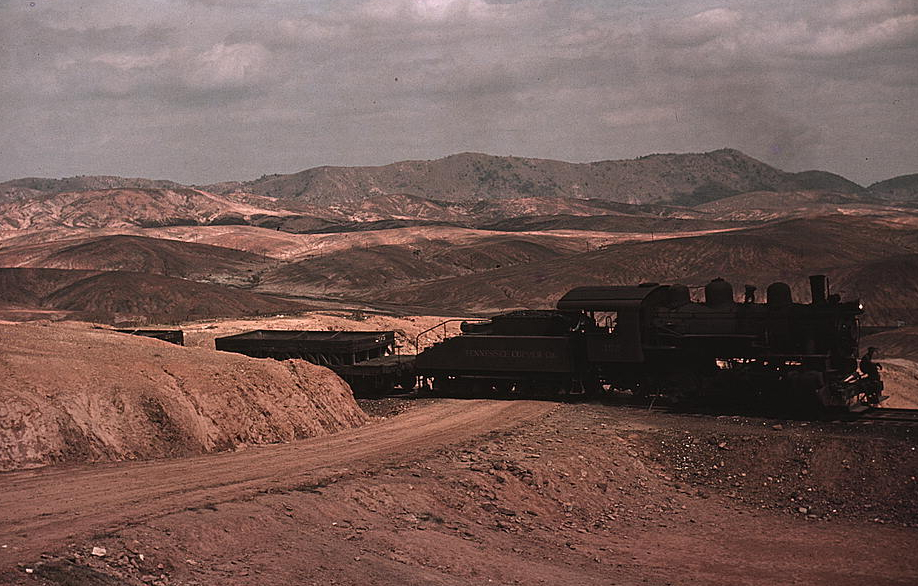
A train bringing copper ore out of the Ducktown mines, 1939. Smelter fumes have destroyed all vegetation and eroded the land. Photo by Marion Post Wolcott.

Native copper was discovered in 1843 by a prospector, presumably panning for gold. The first shipment of copper ore was taken out on muleback in 1847. More than 30 mining companies were incorporated between 1852 and 1855 to mine copper at Ducktown. Development was accelerated by a road built in 1853 connecting the area with Cleveland, Tennessee. The first smelter was built in the Ducktown district in 1854.

Mining temporarily ceased when Union troops destroyed the copper refinery and mill at Cleveland, Tennessee in 1863. It resumed in 1866, and continued until 1878, when the mines had exhausted the shallow high-grade copper ores.

=== Later years ===
By 1906, the Tennessee Copper Company had begun constructing an acid reclamation plant near Copperhill to recover most of the sulfur in the form of sulfuric acid rather than releasing it to the atmosphere. Froth flotation was added in the 1920s.

== Geography ==
Ducktown is situated at the center of the Copper Basin (sometimes called the Ducktown Basin), a broad valley located in the southern Appalachian Mountains near the intersection of Tennessee, Georgia, and North Carolina. The Ducktown area is part of the Ocoee River watershed (which hosted the Canoe slalom events for the 1996 Summer Olympics in Atlanta), which passes through the Copper Basin a few miles southwest of Ducktown before entering its gorge. Ducktown is centered just north of the junction of Tennessee State Route 68, which connects the city to Madisonville to the north and Copperhill to the south, and U.S. Route 64, which connects the city to Cleveland (via the Ocoee River Gorge) to the west and Murphy, North Carolina to the east.

According to the United States Census Bureau, the city has a total area of 1.9 square miles (4.9 km^{2}), all land.

The Ducktown Basin Museum, located on the site of the Burra Burra Mine in Ducktown, chronicles the geology and history of the mining activities in the basin.

== Demographics ==
Historical population
Census	Pop.	Note	%±
1890	221		—
1960	741		—
1970	562		−24.2%
1980	583		3.7%
1990	421		−27.8%
2000	427		1.4%
2010	475		11.2%
2020	461		−2.9%

=== 2020 census ===
As of the 2020 census, Ducktown had a population of 461. The median age was 56.3 years. 9.5% of residents were under the age of 18 and 39.0% of residents were 65 years of age or older. For every 100 females there were 79.4 males, and for every 100 females age 18 and over there were 79.0 males age 18 and over.

There were 188 households in Ducktown, of which 19.1% had children under the age of 18 living in them. Of all households, 40.4% were married-couple households, 18.6% were households with a male householder and no spouse or partner present, and 37.2% were households with a female householder and no spouse or partner present. About 38.8% of all households were made up of individuals and 23.4% had someone living alone who was 65 years of age or older.

There were 238 housing units, of which 21.0% were vacant. The homeowner vacancy rate was 6.1% and the rental vacancy rate was 0.0%.

0.0% of residents lived in urban areas, while 100.0% lived in rural areas.

Racial composition as of the 2020 census
Race	Number	Percent
White	423	91.8%
Black or African American	0	0.0%
American Indian and Alaska Native	7	1.5%
Asian	8	1.7%
Native Hawaiian and Other Pacific Islander	0	0.0%
Some other race	0	0.0%
Two or more races	23	5.0%
Hispanic or Latino (of any race)	0	0.0%

=== 2010 census ===
As of the census of 2010, there was a population of 475, with 209 households and 105 families residing in the city. The population density was 221.5 inhabitants per square mile (85.5/km^{2}). There were 230 housing units at an average density of 119.3 per square mile (46.1/km^{2}). The racial makeup of the city was 96.21% White, 0.21% Black or African American, 0.21% from other races, and 3.37% White and Native American. Hispanic or Latino of any race were 0.21% of the population.

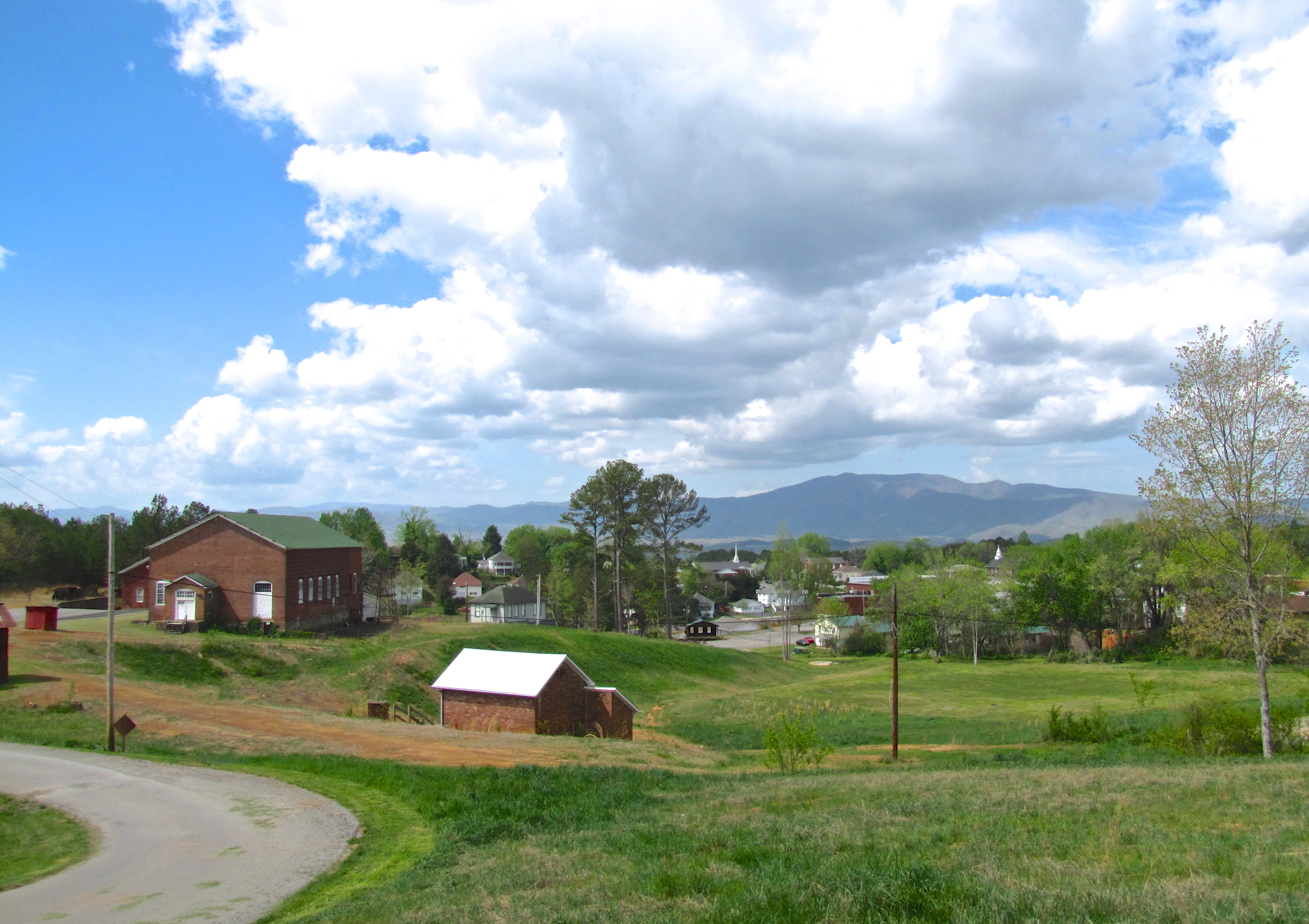
View across Ducktown, with Big Frog Mountain in the distance

There were 209 households, out of which 16.3% had children under the age of 18 living with them, 37.8% were married couples living together, 7.7% had a female householder with no husband present, and 49.3% were non-families. 46.4% of all households were made up of individuals, and 27.8% had someone living alone who was 65 years of age or older. The average household size was 2.04 and the average family size was 2.92.

In the city, the population was spread out, with 17.3% under the age of 18, 7.5% from 18 to 24, 21.8% from 25 to 44, 26.2% from 45 to 64, and 27.2% who were 65 years of age or older. The median age was 49 years. For every 100 females, there were 75.7 males. For every 100 females age 18 and over, there were 69.7 males.

The median income for a household in the city was $18,125, and the median income for a family was $27,045. Males had a median income of $25,833 versus $19,688 for females. The per capita income for the city was $12,113. About 20.4% of families and 25.9% of the population were below the poverty line, including 30.4% of those under age 18 and 37.6% of those age 65 or over.

== See also ==
- Copper Basin (Tennessee)
- Burra Burra Mine (Tennessee)
- Kimsey Junior College
- Ocoee Whitewater Center
