= Apron stage =

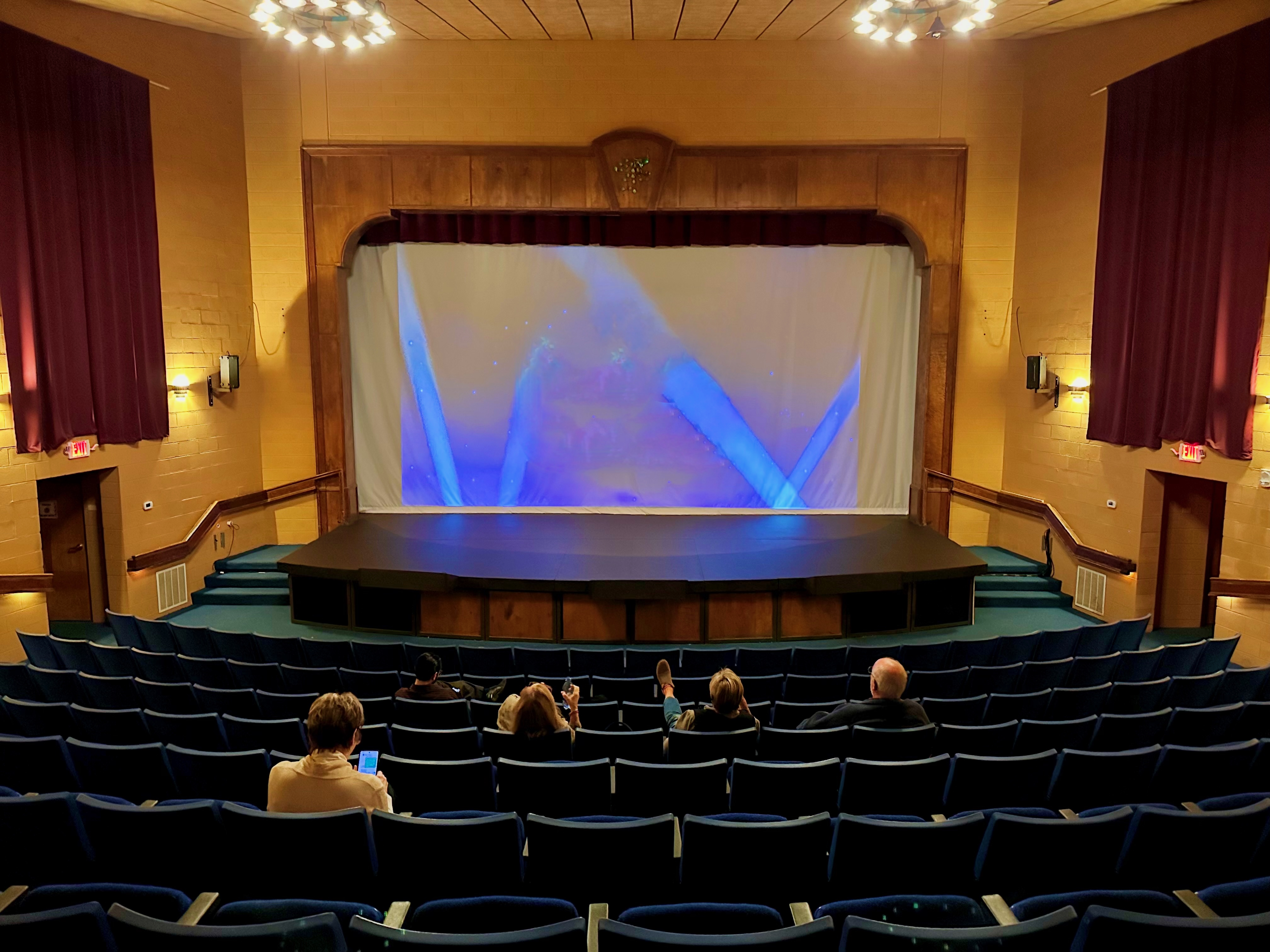
A stage apron extends past the proscenium arch at the Peacock Performing Arts Center in Hayesville, North Carolina

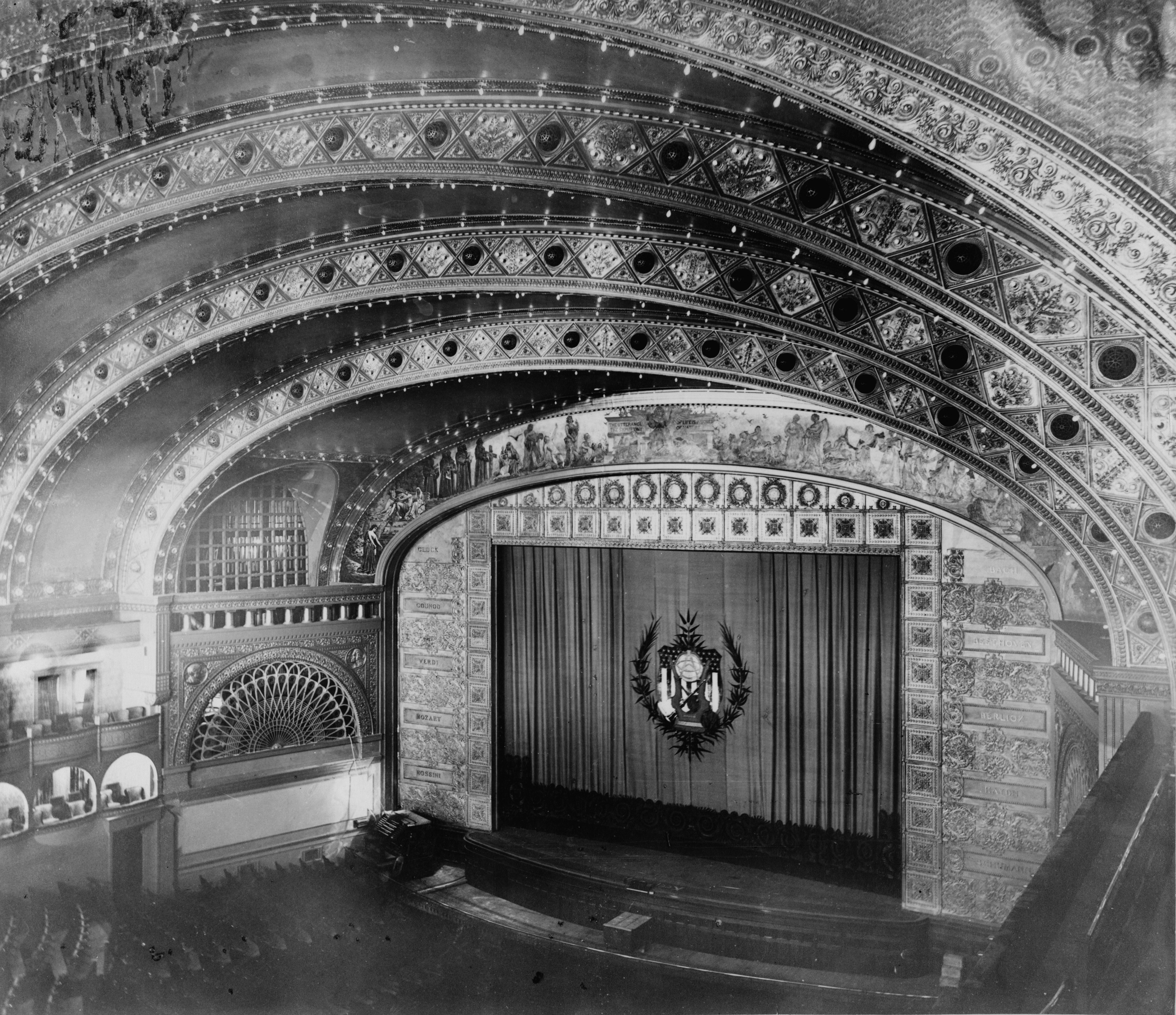
Chicago Auditorium Building, interior from balcony

The apron is any part of the stage that extends past the proscenium arch and into the audience or seating area. The Elizabethan stage, which was a raised platform with the audience on three sides, is an outstanding example. The Elizabethan stage was typically found in public theatres as plays were no longer performed outside. Theatres were simple in structure, mostly circular in form, within was a courtyard open to the sky, surrounded by two or three tiers of covered galleries. At one side of the courtyard was the stage. On either sides of this stage, two pillars supported the ceiling while at the back was another stage overlooked by a gallery with balcony and windows. In front of this stage was a movable curtain. The front stage served most purposes. In this kind of stage there was close vicinity between audience and actors. The vestigial platform was called the apron which stood in front of the proscenium arc and accommodated most of the acting. Only after the middle of the 19th century was the apron cut down and, finally, discarded.

Today, most stages have edges curved slightly outward providing a very small apron. Some have a large playing space protruding into the audience and in turn a very large apron.

The Globe has a rectangular stage platform, also known as an 'apron stage', thrust out into the middle of the open-air yard. The stage measured approximately 43 feet (13.1 m) in width, 27 feet (8.2 m) in depth and was raised about 5 feet (1.5 m) off the ground. On this stage, there was a trap door for use by performers to enter from the "cellarage" area beneath the stage.

The term apron stage can also mean a thrust stage.
