= National Register of Historic Places listings in Clay County, North Carolina =

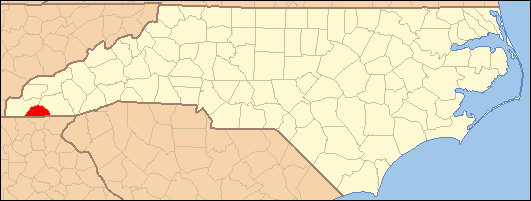

This list includes properties and districts listed on the National Register of Historic Places in Clay County, North Carolina. Click the "Map of all coordinates" link to the right to view a Google map of all properties and districts with latitude and longitude coordinates in the table below.

== Current listings ==
This National Park Service list is complete through NPS recent listings posted March 14, 2025.

	Name on the Register	Image	Date listed	Location	City or town	Description
1	Chatuge Hydroelectric Project	Chatuge Hydroelectric Project	August 11, 2017 (#100001461)	221 Old Ranger Rd. 35°01′16″N 83°47′04″W	Hayesville	
2	Clay County Courthouse	Clay County Courthouse	October 29, 1975 (#75001250)	Main St. 35°02′45″N 83°49′04″W	Hayesville	
3	John Covington Moore House		July 21, 1983 (#83001840)	SR 1307; 35°05′10″N 83°46′20″W	Tusquittee	
4	Spikebuck Town Mound and Village Site	Spikebuck Town Mound and Village Site	August 17, 1982 (#82003443)	By the Clay County Recreation Center; 35°02′46″N 83°48′32″W	Hayesville	

== See also ==
- National Register of Historic Places listings in North Carolina
- List of National Historic Landmarks in North Carolina
