= John Covington Moore House =

Historic house in North Carolina, United States

- U.S. National Register of Historic Places
- Location within North Carolina Location within the United States
- Nearest city: Tusquitee, North Carolina
- Coordinates: 35°5′8″N 83°46′19″W
- Area: 0.4 acres (0.16 ha)
- Built: 1838
- NRHP reference No.: 83001840
- Added to NRHP: July 21, 1983

The John Covington Moore House is a historic house in rural Clay County, North Carolina. It was located on North Carolina Route 1307, about 4 miles (6.4 km) from the county seat, Hayesville. The 1 1/2-story log structure was built c. 1838 by John C. Moore, not long after the forced removal of the Cherokee from the area. The building is mounted on fieldstone piers, and has a porch extending across its front. There are shed-roofed rooms across the back of the house, and an exterior chimney at one end.

John C. Moore is acknowledged as Clay County's first white settler. He began homesteading in the area as early as 1833, and claimed the land around this house after the Cherokee removal. He was one of Clay County's first commissioners.

Moore was one of three commissioners tasked with designating the boundaries of Clay County and served as a county commissioner between 1869 and 1872. In 1854, Moore bought land on Brasstown Creek where he discovered evidence of gold, leading to a mine there. He also ran a gold mine in Tusquittee.

Moore's house was listed on the National Register of Historic Places in 1983. In the mid-1990s, part of the home was likely moved to the Tusquittee Pioneer Village and the structure lost its spot on the National Register as a result.

== See also ==
- National Register of Historic Places listings in Clay County, North Carolina
