= Peacock Performing Arts Center =

Theatre in North Carolina

- Peacock Playhouse
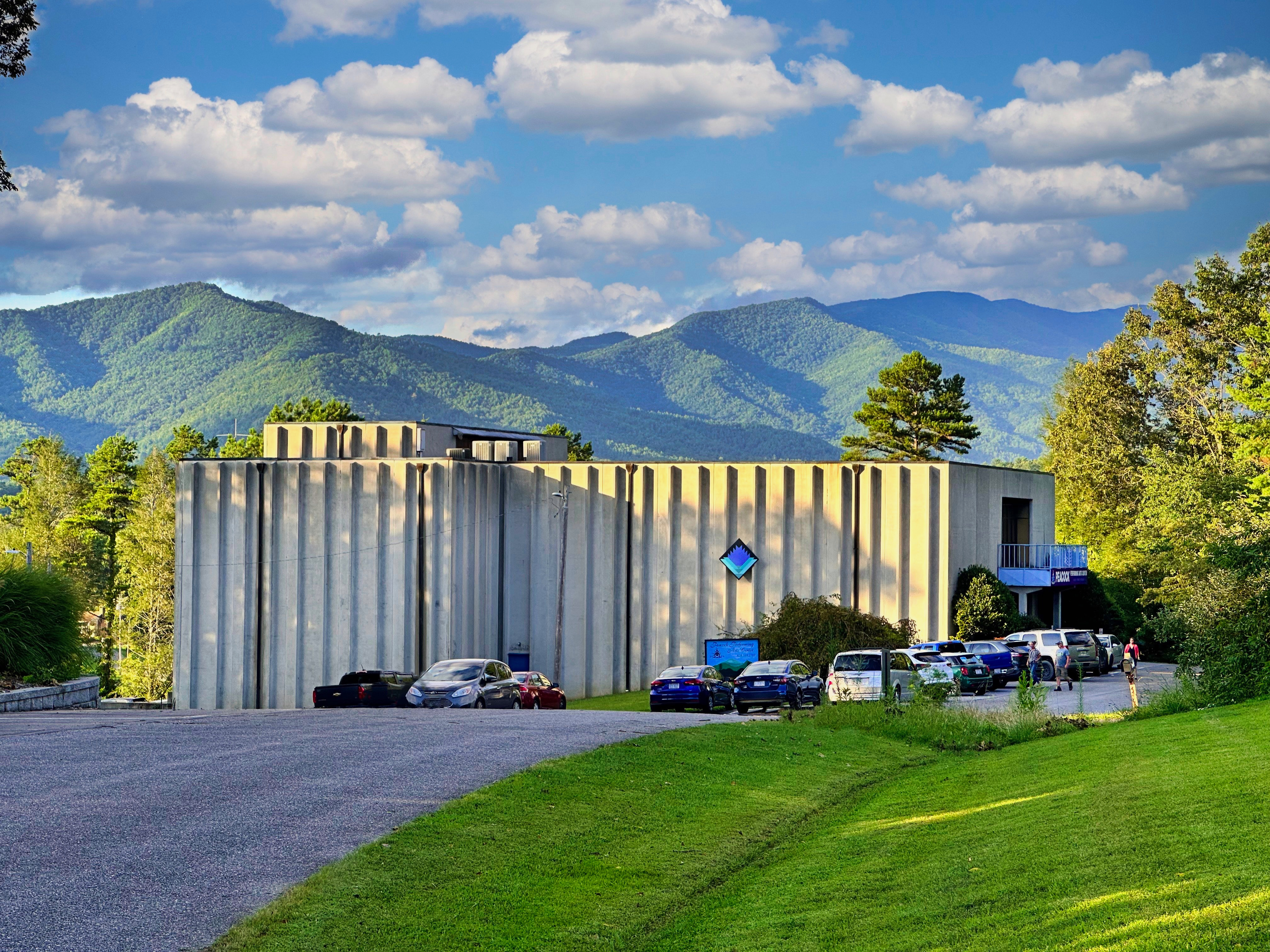
- Interactive map of Peacock Performing Arts Center
- Address: 301 Church Street; Hayesville, North Carolina
- Coordinates: 35.048531°N 83.819171°W
- Operator: Lillith Lidseen Performing Arts Association
- Capacity: 250

Construction
- Opened: 6 June 1986; 40 years ago

Website
- http://www.thepeacocknc.org

The Peacock Performing Arts Center, also known as the Peacock Playhouse, is a four-story, 250-seat theatre in Hayesville, North Carolina. When it was built in the 1980s, it was the only community theatre in far-west North Carolina and was unique as a professional-style theatre in the rural Blue Ridge Mountains and one of the poorest counties in the state.

== History ==
The theatre was built by Lillith Lidseen, who moved to Clay County after her brother Edwin established a pipe manufacturing business in Warne. Lidseen was born in Sweden in 1904, moved with her parents to Chicago, studied fine arts at Wellesley College, acted on stage in Chicago, and taught drama at Hollins College. She moved to Tusquittee, North Carolina, in the 1950s. In June 1974, a community theatre group was founded by the Clay County Historical & Arts Council. That spawned nonprofit volunteer troupe the Licklog Players (named after the local Licklog Creek). The Licklog Players asked Lidseen to direct Brigadoon and Annie Get Your Gun. The troupe had performed shows on the cramped stage of Hayesville High School's auditorium since 1978. Seeing the community's love of theatre, in 1979 Lidseen vowed to construct a professional venue in the town of about 400 people. Lidseen's dream for the building was that it be used for education in music, dance, and theatre, showcasing community events as well as national touring companies. Though the idea stemmed from the need to give Licklog a home, all theatre groups in the area were expected to use the facility.

The property was purchased in 1980 and blueprints for the playhouse were drafted in March 1981 by architect Larry Graham of Athens. Then construction on the $750,000 project began on Church Street in downtown Hayesville. Lidseen sold her personal holdings in Chicago, mortgaged her local real estate, and gave all of her personal funds toward the building. However, construction was halted in August 1982 after the IRS audited the Lidseen Foundation. Out of money, Lidseen feared the IRS would take away her home and her health declined due to her worries. The nearly-complete building sat idle for years, attracting vandals. In 1985, Licklog began to use the facility to store materials and sets. By the time auditors gave a green light, Lidseen had entered a rest home. In spring 1986, when the Licklog Players were no longer allowed to use the school auditorium, the community pitched in with financial support and labor to see the playhouse open and the Licklog Players brought the building up to code.

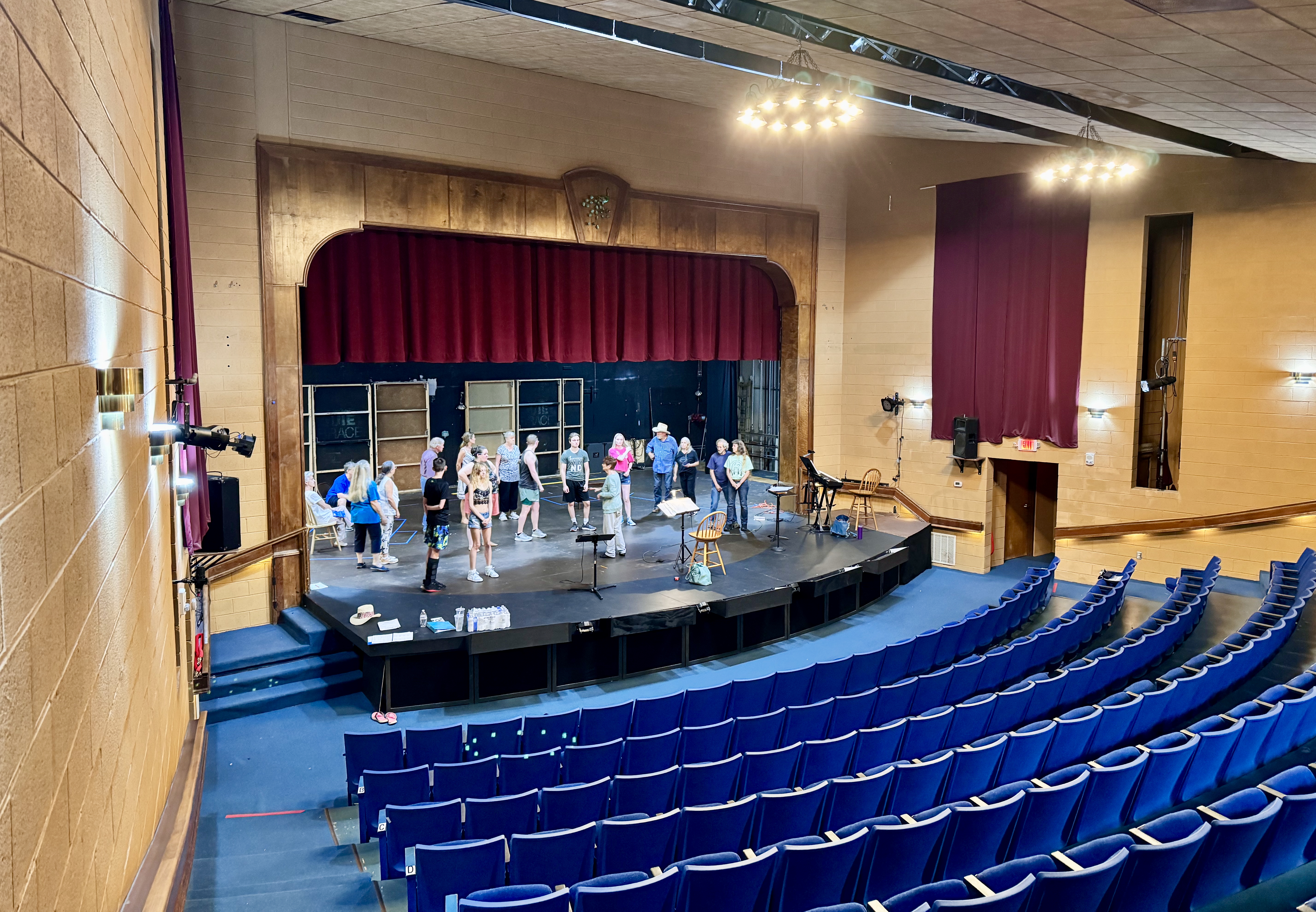
The auditorium and stage during a play rehearsal

The theatre's first show was The Curious Savage by the Licklog Players on June 6, 1986. The play, about an old wealthy woman who gave away money to folks with crazy dreams, was dedicated to Lidseen. Lidseen was seriously ill at the time of the theatre's opening and died January 7, 1987, before she was able to see a production there. Her ghost is said to haunt the theatre. At its opening the theatre was described by the Asheville Citizen-Times as the "fanciest community theater west of Asheville" with a "21st century design" and a "first-rate stage." Lidseen raised peafowl on her property and the building was named after her favorite animal. The seats were upholstered in peacock blue, feathers adorn the interior, and a stained glass peacock looks over the lobby. At completion, the theatre was one of the largest inhabitable structures in the county.

The Licklog Players staged around eight plays each season at the theatre. A dance studio and costume shop occupied the top floor. A weeklong summer youth theatre camp, Peacock Pride, operated by the 1990s. By 2007, the building was threatened by debt and deterioration. Padgett & Freeman Architects designed plans in 2008 to construct an annex on the southwest side of the building to house a black box theatre, but it was not constructed. The Lilith Lidseen Performing Arts Association was founded in 2007 and raised $800,000 to buy the playhouse in 2009 and renovate it. After performing more than 100 plays at the venue, the Licklog Players moved to a strip mall and closed down following their 2014 season. The LLPAA diversified the range of content staged at the venue, adding concerts, dance classes, and writer events year-round in addition to staging three plays, a musical, and kids camps each season. The LLPAA began selling concessions and alcohol at the theatre for the first time. The Peacock's roof was repaired in 2024, but a replacement is still needed. The venue's restrooms were renovated in early 2025 to be ADA compliant. In 2026, the Peacock named its stage in honor of Laurel Adams, who started directing at the venue in 1998. She was named artistic director in 2012.

The venue remains the only purpose-built community theatre in the region west of Franklin, North Carolina.
