= Spikebuck Town Mound and Village Site =

- U.S. National Register of Historic Places
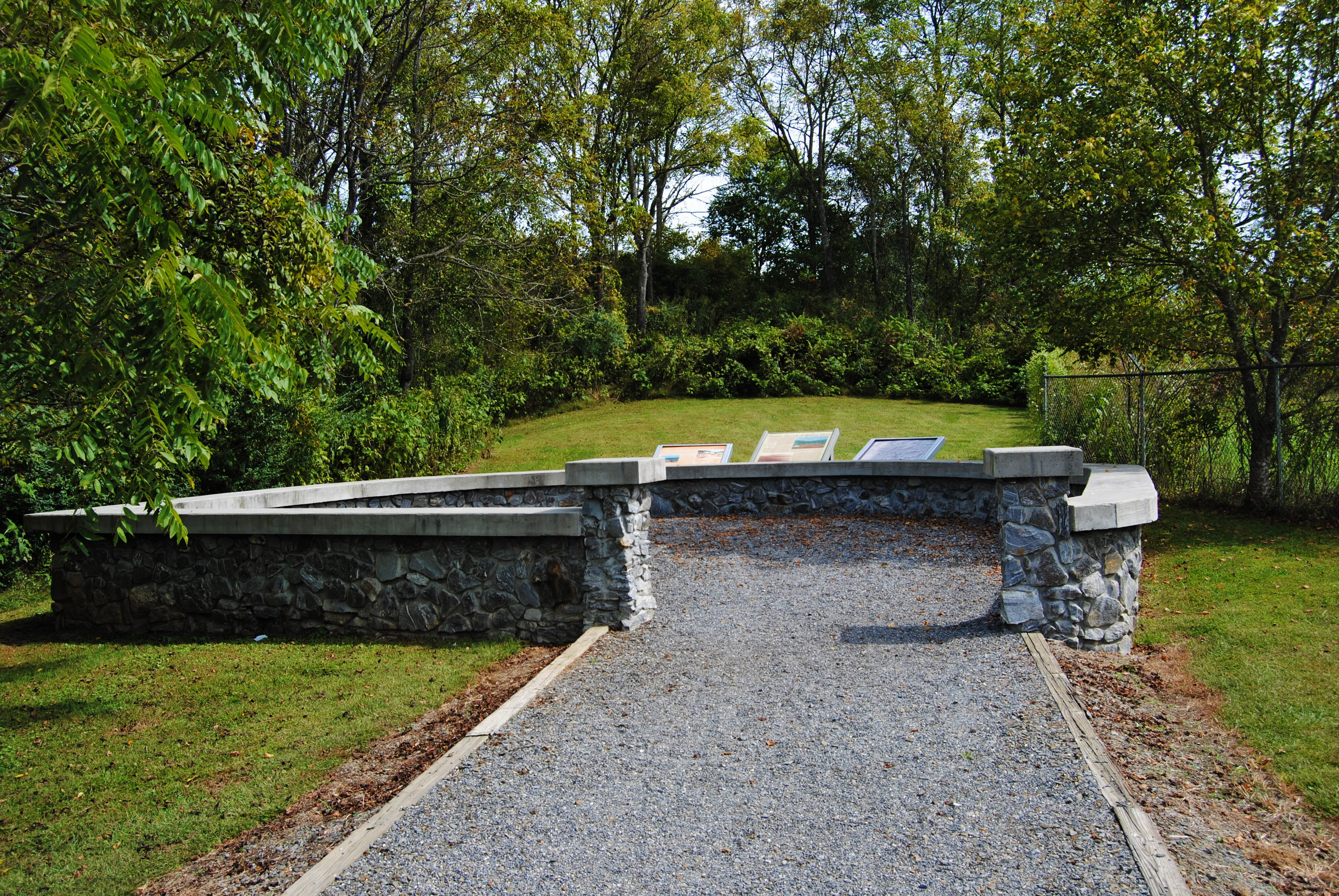

- Location within North Carolina Location within the United States
- Location: Hayesville, North Carolina
- Coordinates: 35.046111°N 83.808889°W
- Area: 145 acres (59 ha)
- NRHP reference No.: 82003443
- Added to NRHP: August 17, 1982

The Spikebuck Town Mound and Village Site is a prehistoric and historic archaeological site on Town Creek near its confluence with the Hiwassee River within the boundaries of present-day Hayesville, North Carolina. The site encompasses the former area of the Cherokee village of Quanassee (also spelled Qunassee on a 1725 colonial map) and associated farmsteads. The village was centered on what is known as Spikebuck Mound, an earthwork platform mound, likely built about 1,000 CE by ancestral indigenous peoples during the South Appalachian Mississippian culture period.

Quanassee was known by the English in the colonial period as one of the historic Cherokee "Valley Towns". At one time, it had a population of several hundred, but by 1721 had declined, in part because of the Creek-Cherokee War (c. 1716–1752). It was razed at the beginning of the American Revolution by state militias during the Rutherford Light Horse expedition of fall 1776, because the Cherokee were allied with the British when colonial rebels launched the war. The area was known as Quanassee into the early 1800s. Most of the Cherokee were forcibly removed from North Carolina and the Southeast. The mound and village site was listed as an archeological site on the National Register of Historic Places in 1982.

== History ==
Indigenous peoples lived for more than a thousand years along the river. People of the South Appalachian Mississippian culture era are believed to have constructed an earthen platform mound and village as the expression of their stratified society.

In their time, the historic Cherokee settled here, building their communal townhouse on top of the platform mound. It was their chief expression of public architecture, designed to provide a place for the community to gather for ceremony and for taking care of town issues. The townhouse would be regularly replaced and maintenance accomplished on the mound as well.

The town of Quanassee was documented by European colonists during the early colonial period as one of the Cherokee "Valley Towns" along the Hiwassee River, appearing on a 1725 map as Qunassee. The Cherokee occupied it from the 17th century into the 19th century. Some historic documents suggest that it was one of the towns attacked and damaged by American rebels in 1776 during the Revolutionary War, as the Cherokee supported the British.

The Cherokee in the late 1830s were forced by the United States to cede their land here and other areas of the region. Many of the people were gathered and held in this area prior to being forced on the Trail of Tears, beginning in 1838 in Tennessee, to Indian Territory west of the Mississippi River.

== 20th century to present ==
The mound and village areas were long held in private ownership by European Americans who settled here after the Cherokee. The larger town area was cultivated for crops, disturbing the topsoil layer.

In 1961, the site was still owned by State Representative Wiley A. McGlamery. He invited the first official excavation, which was performed by Frank Osborne. He found a fire pit in the village area and a post-mold pattern of an oval-shaped house. The oval shape was typical of historic Cherokee domestic houses of the English Contact period (ca. A.D. 1670–1740) Earlier they preferred a square or rectangular form.

In 1973 and 1975, an archeological team from Western Carolina University conducted excavations. they found artifacts dating to 3,000 B.C. (in the Woodland period) and 1,000 A.D. (early South Appalachian Mississippian culture period, when the earthen platform mound was believed to have been built. Evidence of a palisade that extended around the Cherokee town was also found. In addition, they found historic Cherokee and European artifacts, the latter attesting to the trade that colonists conducted with the Cherokee.

In total, "House patterns, fire pits, European trade goods, storage pits, burned timbers, and a variety of pottery, pipes, and beads" were found. These documented likely European contact, as well as the Cherokee connection to wide Native American trading networks that spanned much of the continent, reaching to the Great Lakes.

The archeological site was listed as "Spikebuck Town Mound and Village Site" on the National Register of Historic Places in 1982.

In 2000, the portion of the site containing the mound was acquired by Clay County, which is protecting it. The county developed an overlook sitting area near the mound. (See image). The Veterans Recreational Park off Anderson Street was developed nearby, in downtown Hayesville.

In addition, the Clay County Communities Revitalization Association (CCRA) is working to preserve other Cherokee resources in Hayesville: the Quanassee Path (named after the former Cherokee town), which highlights five Cherokee features near Hayesville; the Cherokee Homestead Exhibit, with reconstructions of typical paired winter and summer houses, and a corn crib; and the Cherokee Botanical Sanctuary.

The Archeological Conservancy acquired the former Cherokee town and farmstead site in 2011, and are working to conserve it. Believing that the site has great possibilities for research, they have permitted Western Carolina University to conduct archeological field schools there in an effort to map more findings and try to create a town layout. Students have used the technology of remote sensing to establish data about possible structures in a non-invasive way. By 2016, the team was able to conduct a targeted excavation, which has revealed "a large feature", likely a house.

== See also ==
- National Register of Historic Places listings in Clay County, North Carolina
