= Clay County Courthouse (North Carolina) =

Historic courthouse in North Carolina, US

- U.S. National Register of Historic Places
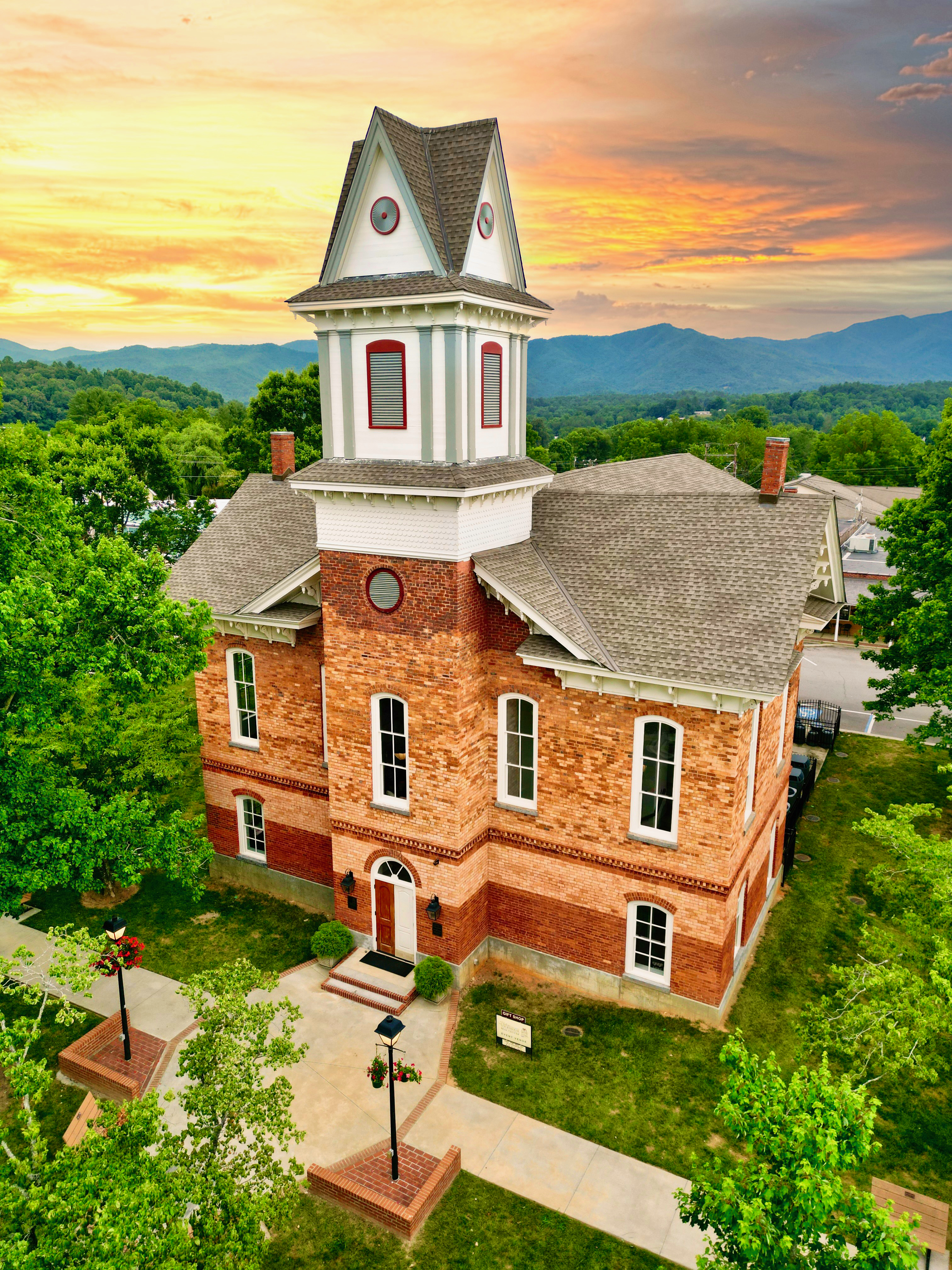
- Clay County Courthouse, June 2022

- Location within North Carolina Location within the United States
- Location: Main St., Hayesville, North Carolina
- Coordinates: 35°2′44″N 83°49′5″W
- Area: 1 acre (0.40 ha)
- Built: 1887
- Built by: J.S. Anderson
- Architect: William Gould Bulgin
- Architectural style: Italianate
- NRHP reference No.: 75001250
- Added to NRHP: October 29, 1975

The Clay County Courthouse is located on Main Street in Hayesville, Clay County, North Carolina. The T-shaped two-story brick building was built in 1888, and is a prominent local example of vernacular Italianate architecture. Its most visible feature is a three-story square tower, which projects for half its width from the main facade, and through which entry to the building is gained.

The building was listed on the National Register of Historic Places in 1975. The courthouse is located on a tree-filled square in the town center, with one- and two-story commercial buildings on the perimeter.

== History ==
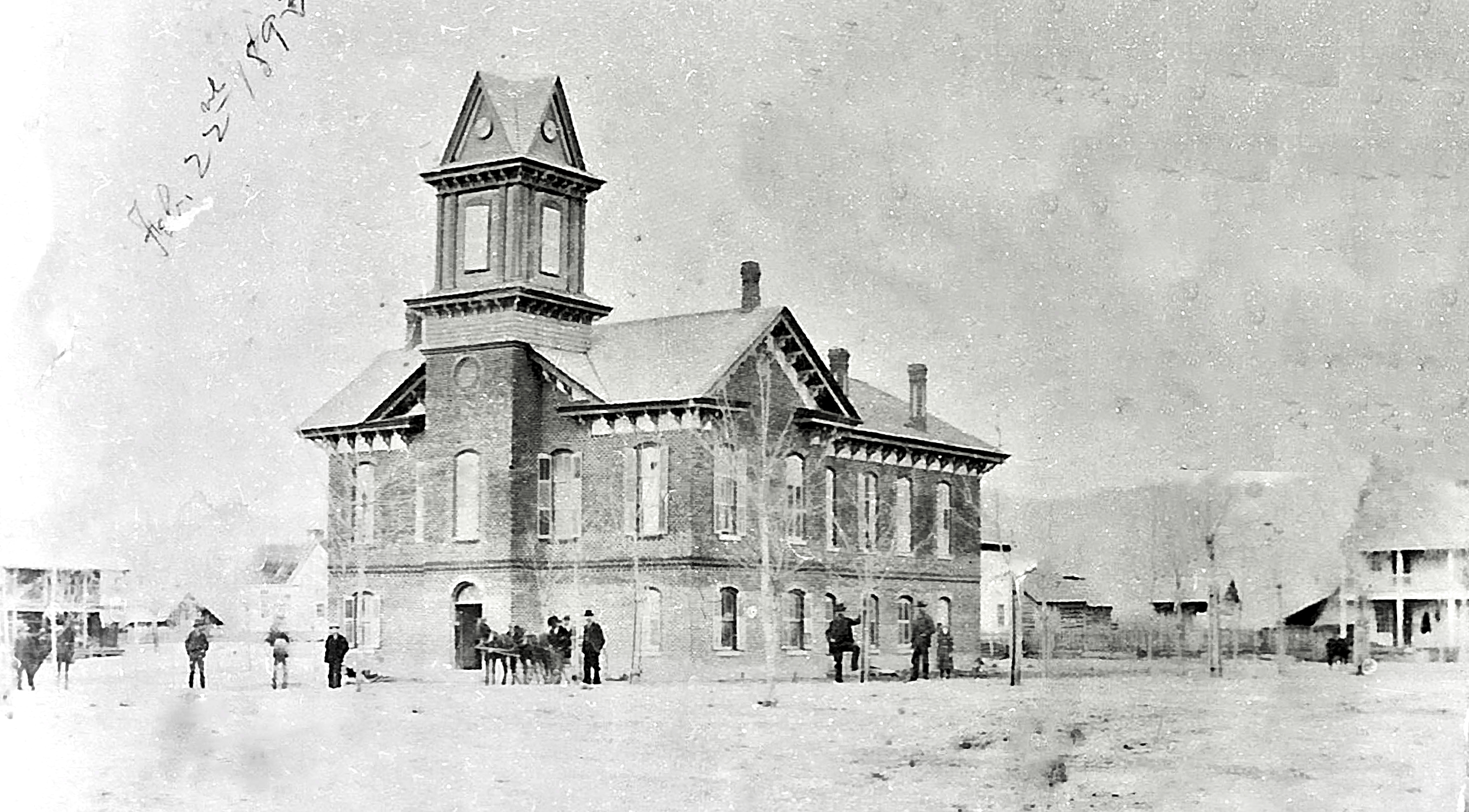
The courthouse in 1893, four years after construction

Early county trials and commissioners’ meetings were held at Fort Hembree. The fort was built in present-day Hayesville by Tennessee militia in 1837. A residence was used for court from 1861 until 1866 while a wood-frame courthouse was built on the south side of the current town square near the corner of Curtis and Sanderson streets. On May 20, 1870, an inmate escaped from the county jail and lit the courthouse on fire overnight in an attempt to destroy his records. As a result, the building and all early county records were lost. After the fire a building operated by the Masonic lodge was leased and used as a courthouse. From 1887 to 1889 court was held in a Presbyterian church.

On August 15, 1887, William Gould Bulgin of Macon County presented Clay County commissioners with plans for a new two-story brick courthouse. The blueprints were fashioned after the layout of the courthouse that Bulgin had designed for neighboring Franklin in 1881. The following month commissioners opened bids for construction.

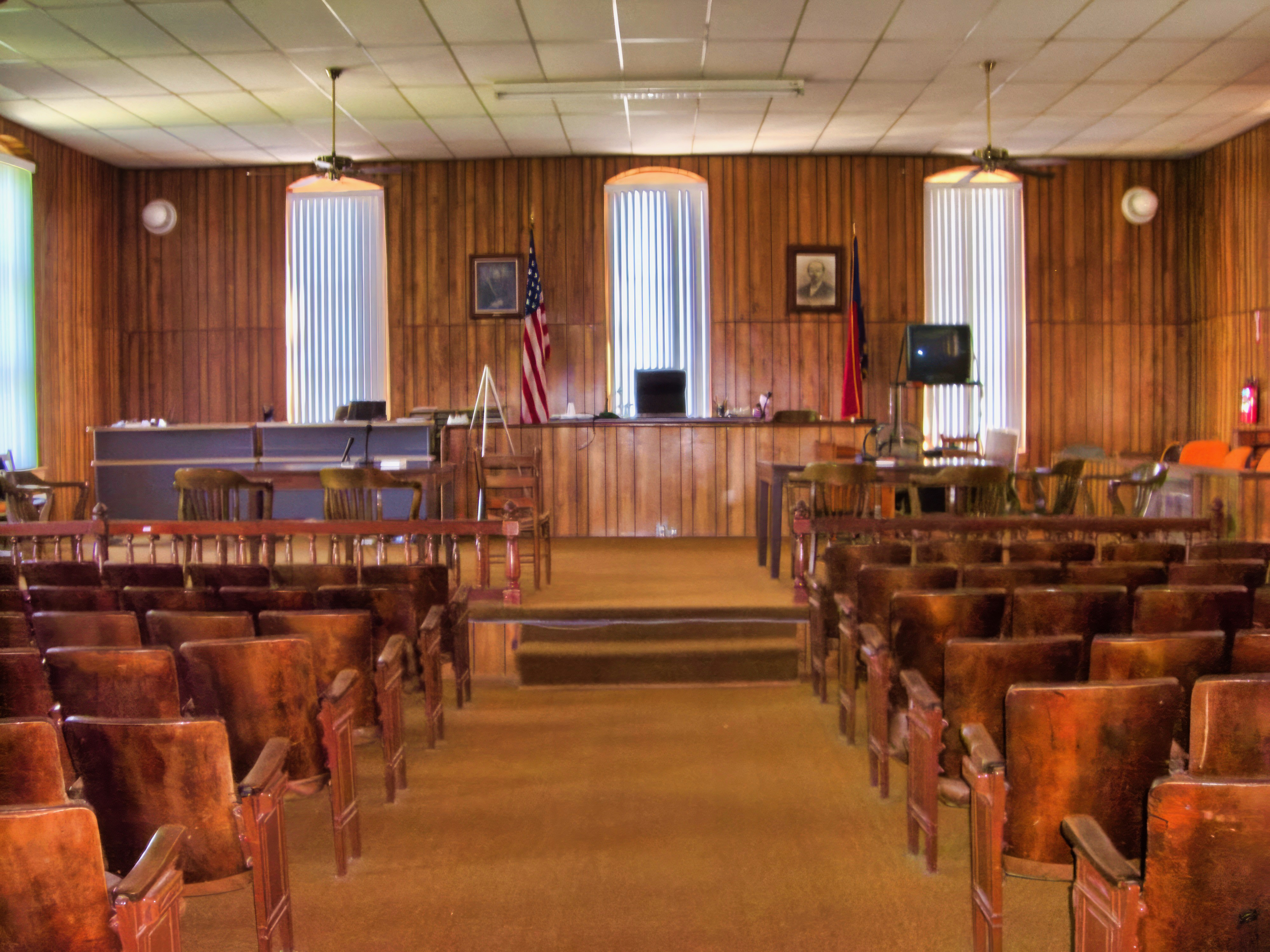
The courtroom in 2007 before the historic courthouse was renovated

Captain J.S. Anderson was awarded the contract. Bricks were made in Hayesville and nearby Murphy for the building. Construction was completed on November 5, 1889, at a cost of $7,799.50. The building featured high ceilings to cool it in the summer and walls two feet thick. The ground floor was composed of offices, each with a fireplace for heat. One courtroom with about 130 seats was on the second level and served both district and superior courts. Cuspidors were located throughout the building.

In the early 1900s, the nascent Clay County School District evidently held summer teacher training institutes at the courthouse. In 1912 the original wooden floor had to be replaced with concrete. Oil heat was installed around 1967. Court was held only twice per year until approximately 1969, when a new district court system began. The building's interior was renovated in 1972 and its steeple was replaced in 1990. A room in the courthouse served as Clay County’s public library for a number of years before a new library was constructed in 1967. The octagonal gazebo stage which shares the town square with the courthouse was built in 1989 by Hayesville High School's vocational carpentry class. The structure cost $5,000 and funds were raised by the Clay County Lions Club.

== Modern judicial complex ==
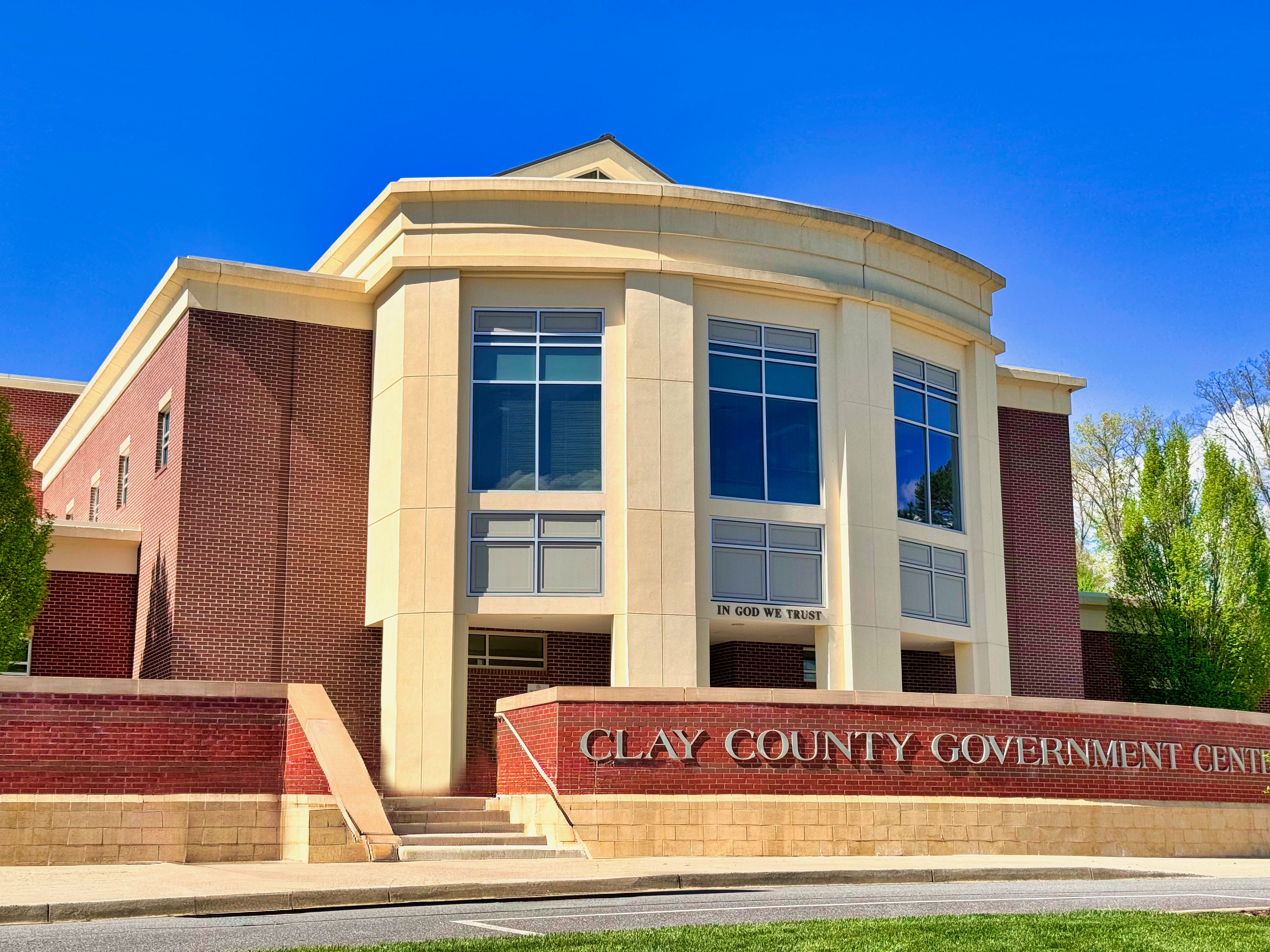
Clay County's modern government center was completed in 2007

Discussion about constructing a new courthouse had begun by 1978. In October 2005 construction began on a 22-acre modern judicial complex 1 mile (1.6 km) west of downtown. The new two-story justice center cost approximately $6.7 million and includes an atrium, 150-seat courtroom, law library, tax office, registrar of deeds, clerk of courts, district attorney's office, multi-purpose room, and probation offices. The building was completed in 2007 and the county's official business moved away from downtown.

Construction on an adjacent 48-inmate jail began in January 2007. It was completed on May 31, 2008, at a cost of $4.4 million. Construction on a new sheriff's office at the site began in June 2008. The complex now includes the offices for multiple county agencies including the health department, transportation department, department of social services, EMS, and 911 center. The $6.2 million 911 center opened at the complex in December 2024.

== The Beal Center ==
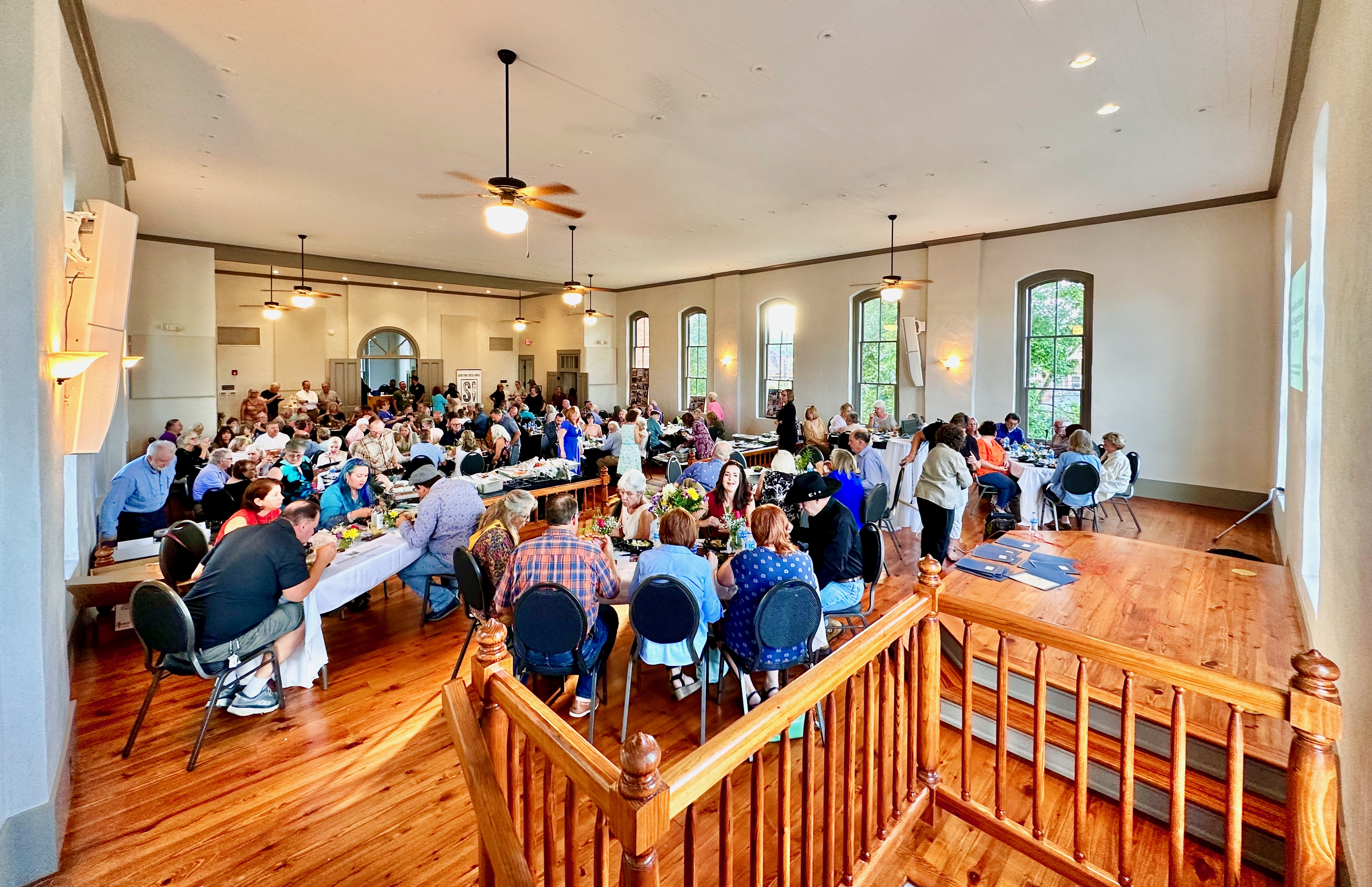
An event at the Beal Center in 2023

After official county business moved out of the historic courthouse in 2007, its interior was stripped and walls began to deteriorate. When ceilings were opened for ductwork, it was discovered that the courtroom floor and the building's roof beams were both on the verge of collapse and had to be repaired. In 2017 Clay County deeded the courthouse property to the Town of Hayesville. The town leases it to the Clay County Communities Revitalization Association, which was founded in 1998. The CCCRA took on the job of raising $1.2 million to preserve the structure. Renovation began in 2017 to turn the building into a community and event venue.

The new venue, dubbed The Beal Center in honor of local benefactor Ron Beal, opened on July 21, 2018. The 2,200-square-foot courtroom is now used for weddings, dances, performances, trade expos and other events such as the annual WNC Festival of Trees. The courtroom accommodates up to 175 people. The building now includes an elevator, kitchen, meeting room, and gift shop. As of 2025, the building hosts around 80 events (including six weddings) per year.

=== Directors ===
1. Dawn Holladay (2023-2024)
2. Claudia Musgrave (2024–present)

== See also ==
- National Register of Historic Places listings in Clay County, North Carolina
- List of county courthouses in North Carolina
