= Clay County School District (North Carolina) =

School district in North Carolina, United States

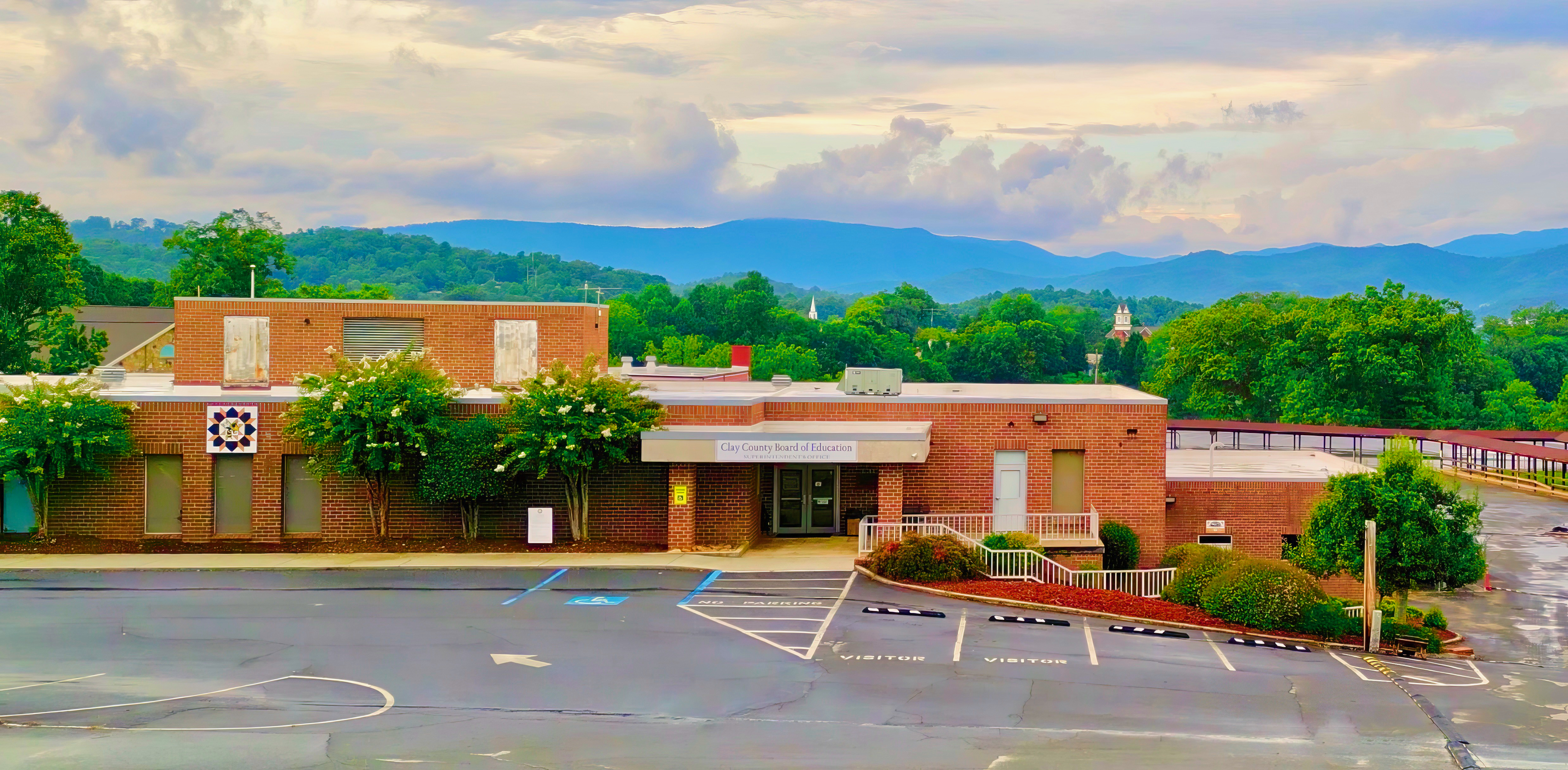
- The main office in Hayesville, N.C.

Address
- 205 Yellow Jacket Drive Hayesville, North Carolina, 28904; United States
- Coordinates: 35.046667°N 83.817778°W

District information
- Motto: All Students Learning At High Levels
- Grades: Pre-K - 12
- Superintendent: Melissa Godfrey
- Budget: $16,760,000

Students and staff
- Enrollment: 1,320
- Faculty: 98
- Teachers: 95
- District mascot: Yellow Jacket
- Colors: Black and gold

Other information
- Website: www.clayschools.org

Clay County Schools (CCS) manages the public school system in Clay County, North Carolina. It is the only school district in Clay County and covers all of the county with about 1,320 students attending a total of 4 separate schools located on a central campus in Hayesville. After county government, Clay County Schools is the county's largest employer with a staff of 205 people.

The district is run by the Clay County Schools superintendent. The current superintendent is former Hayesville Elementary principal Melissa Godfrey. The present school board has five nonpartisan members who are elected by popular vote and are limited to a four-year term.

As of 2021, Clay County's per-student spending is $13,430. The student-to-teacher ratio is 13.71:1. The district's annual budget is $16.76 million. $2.1 million of that comes from Clay County as of 2025. Clay County Schools' graduation rate is among the top 20 in the state, as of 2026. Because of its county-wide coverage, there are some students in the system who have an hour-long bus-ride to and from school.

The Clay County Board of Education holds open meetings at the Central Office on fourth Mondays at 6 p.m. The meetings are live-streamed on the school system's YouTube channel.

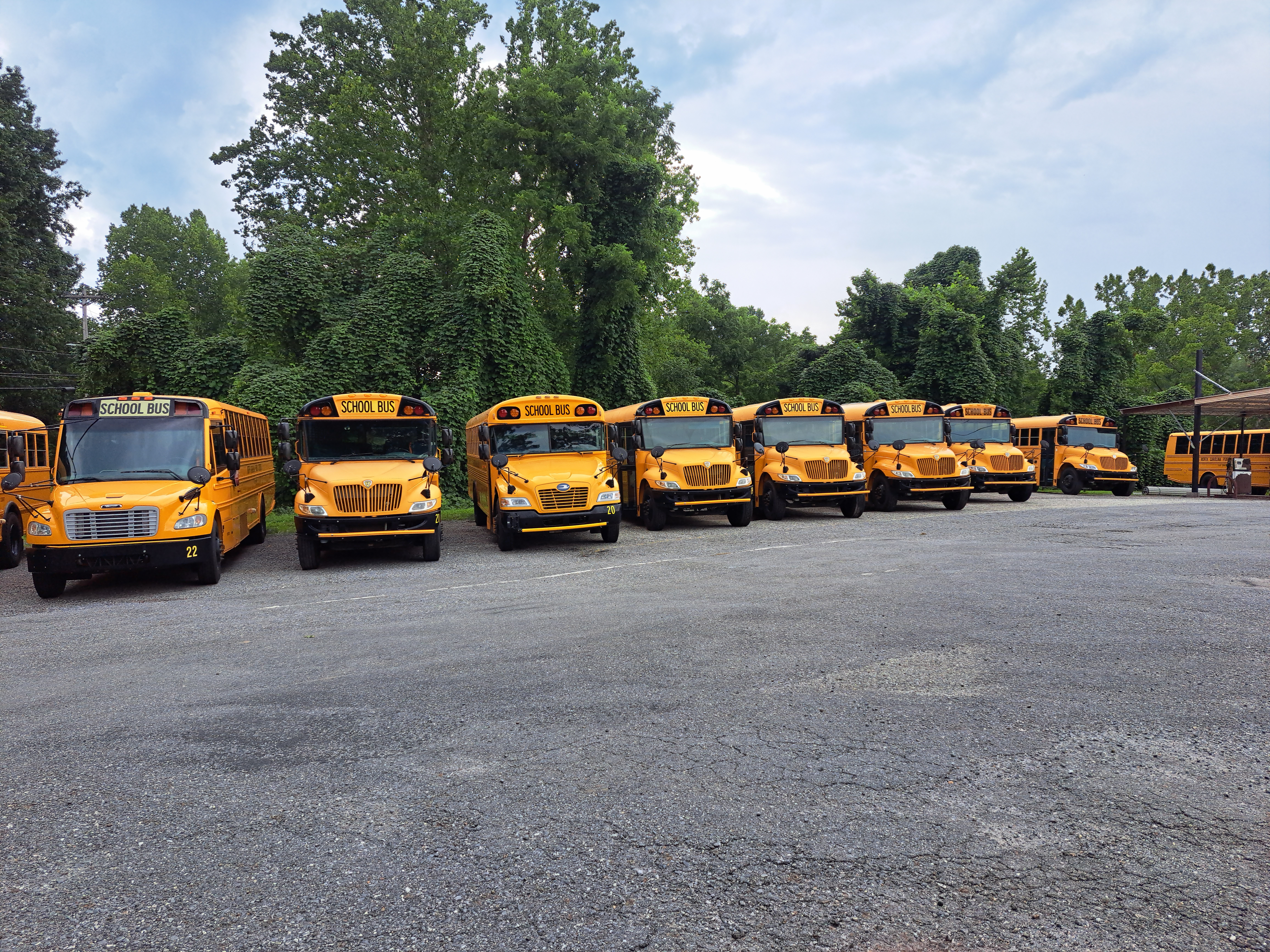
Clay County Schools Bus Garage in July 2023

== Schools ==
Hayesville primary, elementary, middle and high schools are all located in a central campus in Hayesville, North Carolina. There are no separate buses for grade levels, and all students are dropped off at the same time. The schools' colors are Black and Yellow, and their mascot is the Yellow Jacket. The schools share the Frank R. Long Memorial Stadium for football and the Buck Carney Track.

=== Primary ===
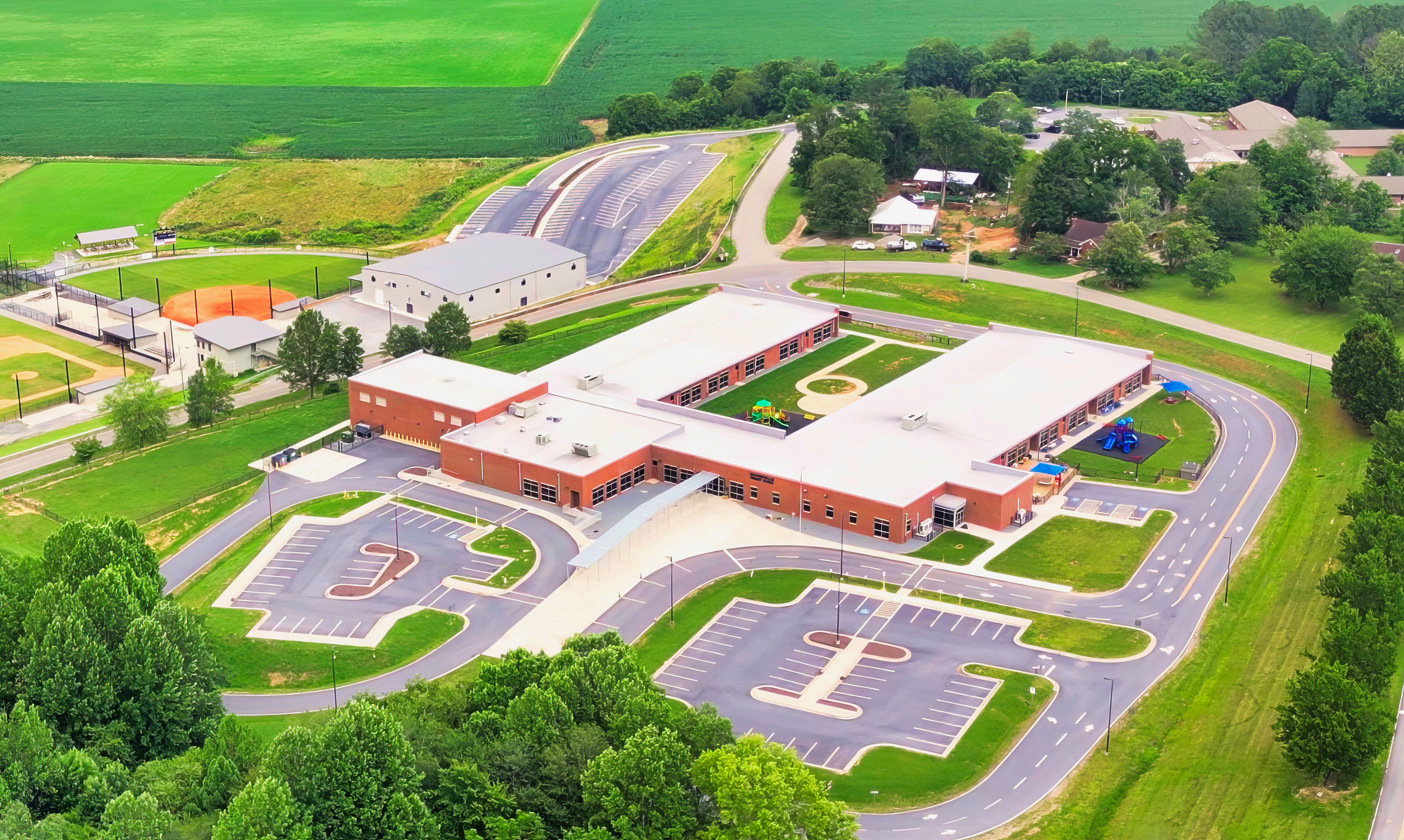
Hayesville Primary School

Hayesville Primary covers Pre-K thru 2nd grade and has an enrollment of approximately 372 students. The $14 million school opened in 2020 on the former site of the high school baseball field.

=== Elementary ===
Hayesville Elementary covers 3rd thru 5th grade and has an enrollment of approximately 277 students. The current building was constructed in 1990.

=== Middle ===
Hayesville Middle covers 6th thru 8th grades and has an active enrollment of around 302 students. HMS was established in 1989. When a new high school facility opened in 1991, the middle school moved into the former high school building, which was constructed in 1950 and renovated at the time of the move.

=== High ===
Hayesville High covers 9th grade thru 12th grade and has an enrollment of 371 students. It is accredited by the Southern Association of Colleges and Schools. The current two-story brick facility on the east end of campus was constructed in 1991. In 1999, a new gymnasium was built. An outdoor classroom complex was added in 2000.

Tri-County Early College High School is a school located in Murphy, North Carolina and covers grades 9 thru 13. The school is part of the Cherokee County School System but also serves Clay County. Students can apply to the school and take a bus from the Hayesville campus to the Tri-County Early College campus.

== Test scores ==
According to the Clay County School System's website, "Test Scores are consistently in the top 10% of all schools in North Carolina." Every year, since the inception of NC's ABC program, Hayesville Elementary has been rated exemplary and Hayesville Middle School has been classified as a School of Distinction or Excellence. Hayesville High School has had the best SAT scores of any school in the area. In 2025, Clay County Schools was the highest-ranking district in the state for 4th grade reading and second in the state for 4th grade math. The district ranked in the top ten for 6th grade English and 8th grade math. In 2025, Clay County Schools was also the highest-scoring district for Math 3 in North Carolina. As of 2025, Clay County Schools ranks 13th overall for academic performance out of 115 districts in the state. As of 2026, Clay County Schools' third grade academics ranked seventh in the state, fifth grade ranked fourth, and seventh grade ranked second. Both seventh grade math and fifth grade reading ranked second in the state in 2026. Seventh grade reading and fifth grade science ranked fourth and fifth in the state respectively, as of 2026.

== History ==
Clay County’s first school was started by Leonard Butterfield around 1834. It charged tuition and was located on a farm near Hyatt’s Creek. In the 1850s, one-room log cabin pay schools opened in Tusquittee, operated by John Oliver Hicks. By 1869, Clay County had an examiner to certify teachers in the county. After Hicks was elected as the first representative from Clay County to the North Carolina General Assembly, he purchased land near Hayesville on Aug. 12, 1870, to establish a school, Hicksville Academy. Hicksville Academy boarded students and charged tuition in a framed, two-story building.

Sometime after 1870, Clay County developed a board of education. School board members were appointed by the North Carolina General Assembly for nearly 100 years until they were elected by the local population in a general election. In the early 1880s, Clay County operated nine white public schools and one “colored” public school serving 884 white students and 36 “colored” students. The Hayesville Colored School was located at the old Mauldin Place near the present day landfill on Hinton Center Rd.

In 1887 Hicksville Academy was sold to the Methodist-Episcopal church and its name was changed to Hayesville Academy. In 1891 management was turned over to Trinity College in Durham which later became Duke University. Courses were then offered from the first grade through college and Hayesville Academy was again renamed, this time to Hayesville Male and Female College. Tuition was $1–2 per month, and student housing cost 25 cents per month. At that time 225 students were enrolled from six different states. In 1898, the college changed ownership and, after the state required counties to stop charging for education, elementary courses were offered for free at Hayesville Graded School.

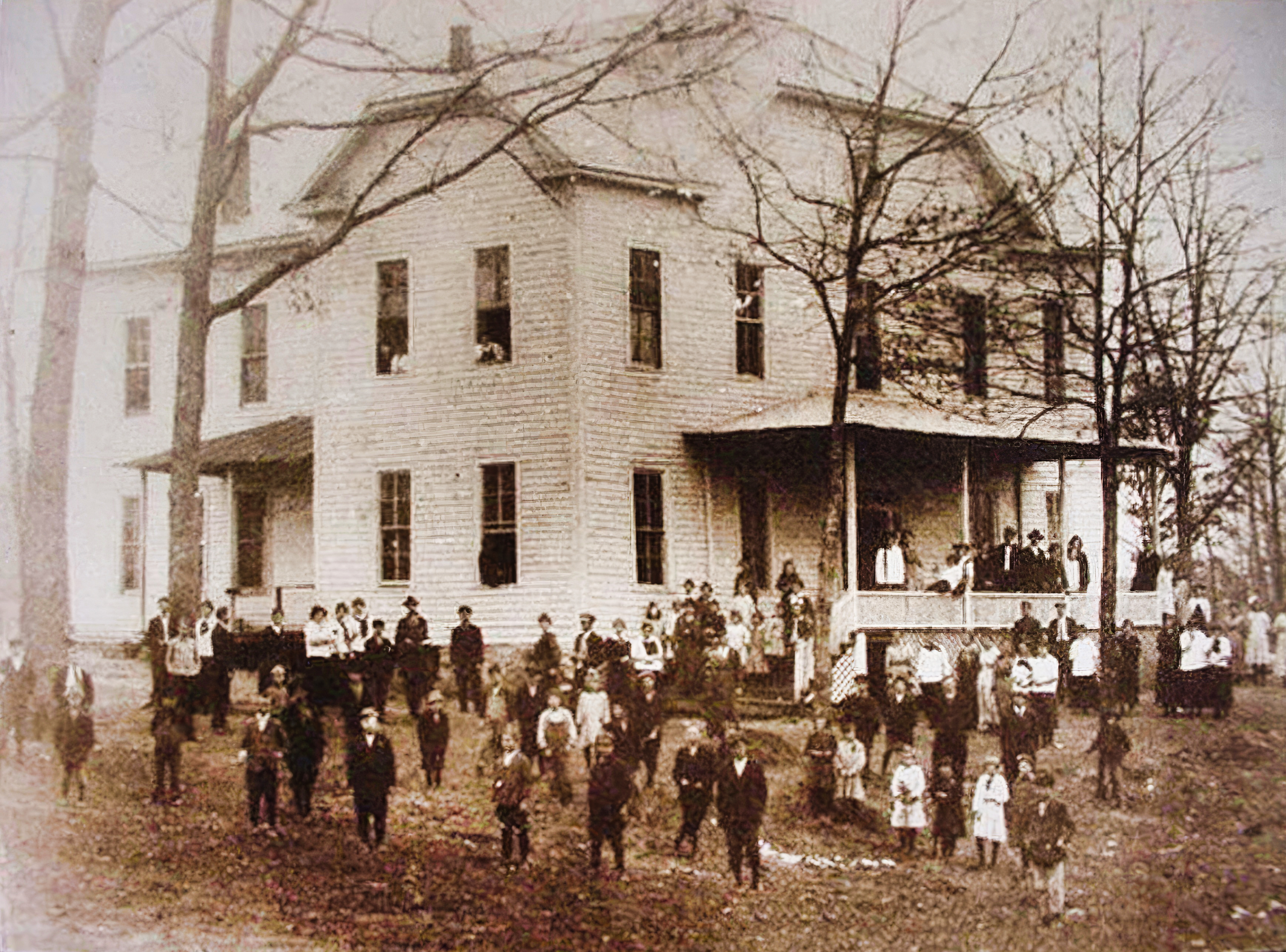
Hayesville High School in the early 1900s.

Clay County’s first recorded school superintendent was T.H. Nancock, who served during the 1898-99 school year. The county had 16 teachers at the time. The county had as many as 18 public schools operating in the early 1900s, most of them one-room schoolhouses that provided instruction through only the seventh grade. Sweetwater School existed by 1906. Oak View School (commonly known as “Chigger Hill School”) existed by 1908. By 1909, Elf High School was in operation with 41 students. Around 1910, high school classes were offered at Ogden School. One-room schoolhouses also existed in Bristol Camp and Carver Gap. Downings Creek School existed by 1915. Fires Creek School existed by 1926. Pisgah School, Buck Creek School, Pinelog School, Upper Tusquittee School, Shooting Creek School, Curtis School (also known as Lick Skillet), and Lower Tusquittee School also operated as early as the 1920s. Hayesville Academy continued to board students through the 1909-10 school year and sometime prior to 1909 the name of the school was changed to Hayesville High School. At that time the school had an enrollment of 108.

=== Consolidation and construction ===
Student attendance in the county hovered around 1,200 between 1906-1918. In the 1920s, as many as five school pickup trucks transported students to schools, with some having a canvas cover tied over the truck bed to shelter students from the weather. Attendance in Clay County schools grew from around 1,000 to more than 1,500 during the 1920s.

Hayesville High School received accreditation in 1924, the same year its two-story wooden frame building was demolished and a new brick building was constructed at a cost of $36,000. The brick schoolhouse was the first school in the county to feature indoor plumbing and running water, which was supplied by an on-campus well. Hayesville High School stopped charging tuition in 1928 and fielded a football team in 1929.

Downings Creek School closed around 1925. Pisgah and Buck Creek Schools were closed after 1926, consolidating with Ogden and Shooting Creek respectively. Pinelog, Lower Tusquittee, and Curtis schools were consolidated in the 1930s. In 1937, Elf School burned down and the high school students were transferred to Hayesville. When the Elf School was rebuilt, it consisted of only an elementary school. From 1937 on, Hayesville was the only high school in the county.

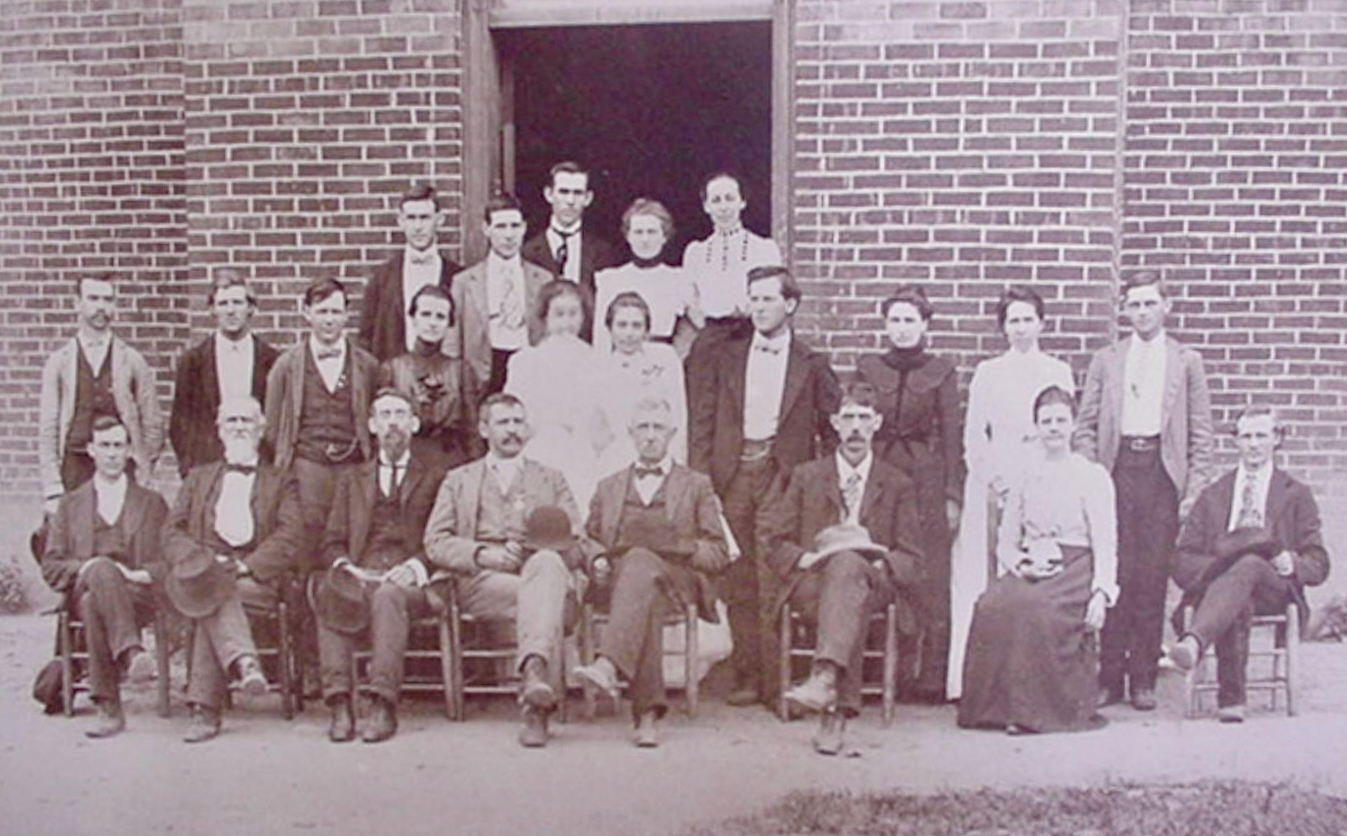
Clay County teachers attend a training session at the Clay County Courthouse in Hayesville in 1902.

During the 1940s, Clay County began using metal school busses. The system further consolidated from eleven schools to four, with Hayesville, Ogden, Elf, and Shooting Creek remaining. The Hayesville Colored School located on the old Mauldin Place was closed in 1945. As schools were still racially segregated, Clay County’s African-American students were bussed daily to Murphy, North Carolina on a pickup truck to attend an all-black school in the Texana community. If an African-American student in Clay County wished to attend high school, they were assigned to Asheville City Schools, approximately 100 miles to the east. Other closings included Upper Tusquittee in 1941, Oak View in 1946, Fires Creek in 1948, and Sweetwater in 1948. Most consolidations were welcomed as they provided students an opportunity to attend high school. However, the closing of Sweetwater School was hotly contested by the citizens of that community as they did not wish for their children to attend the Hayesville School.

The 1950s brought a building boom. A new school was constructed at Shooting Creek and renovations occurred at Ogden and Elf Schools (Elf school closed in 1967, followed by Ogden in 1975, and Shooting Creek in 1978, each consolidating with Hayesville schools). Hayesville built a new auditorium, elementary school, and high school and added 14 acres including an athletic field. Hayesville schools also began using city water. In 1957 a gym was built for the high school (when a new high school gym opened in 1999, Hayesville Middle began using the former one). The current cafeteria was built in 1966. Hayesville's sports teams adopted the "Yellow Jackets" moniker and mascot by the 1970s. The Hayesville school band was organized in 1973. The kindergarten program began in 1973 with kindergarten buildings completed by 1976. In the mid-1970s Hayesville schools purchased an additional 20 acres. The bus garage was added in 1974. A new Occupational Education Building and a greenhouse was added in 1974. In the 1970s, students in the high school carpentry-masonry class built homes which were sold and also constructed the Clay County jail.

In 1988, Hayesville Elementary School moved into a newly-constructed building. Hayesville Middle School was created in 1989 and moved into the former high school building in 1992. Until that time, Hayesville Elementary served kindergarten through 6th grade and Hayesville High School served 7th grade through 12th grade. After the creation of HMS, the middle school consisted of grades 5-8. Following the construction of the Hayesville Primary School in 2020, Hayesville Elementary now serves grades 3-5 and Hayesville Middle serves grades 6-8.

The rock gymnasium was renovated in the early 2000s. Until 2005, the superintendent’s office was located in an old house next to campus. The house was the former Base Penland homestead, moved around 1941 from the Elf community to Hayesville to spare it from flooding during the creation of Chatuge Lake. In November 2005, the superintendent’s office was moved into the former vocational building.

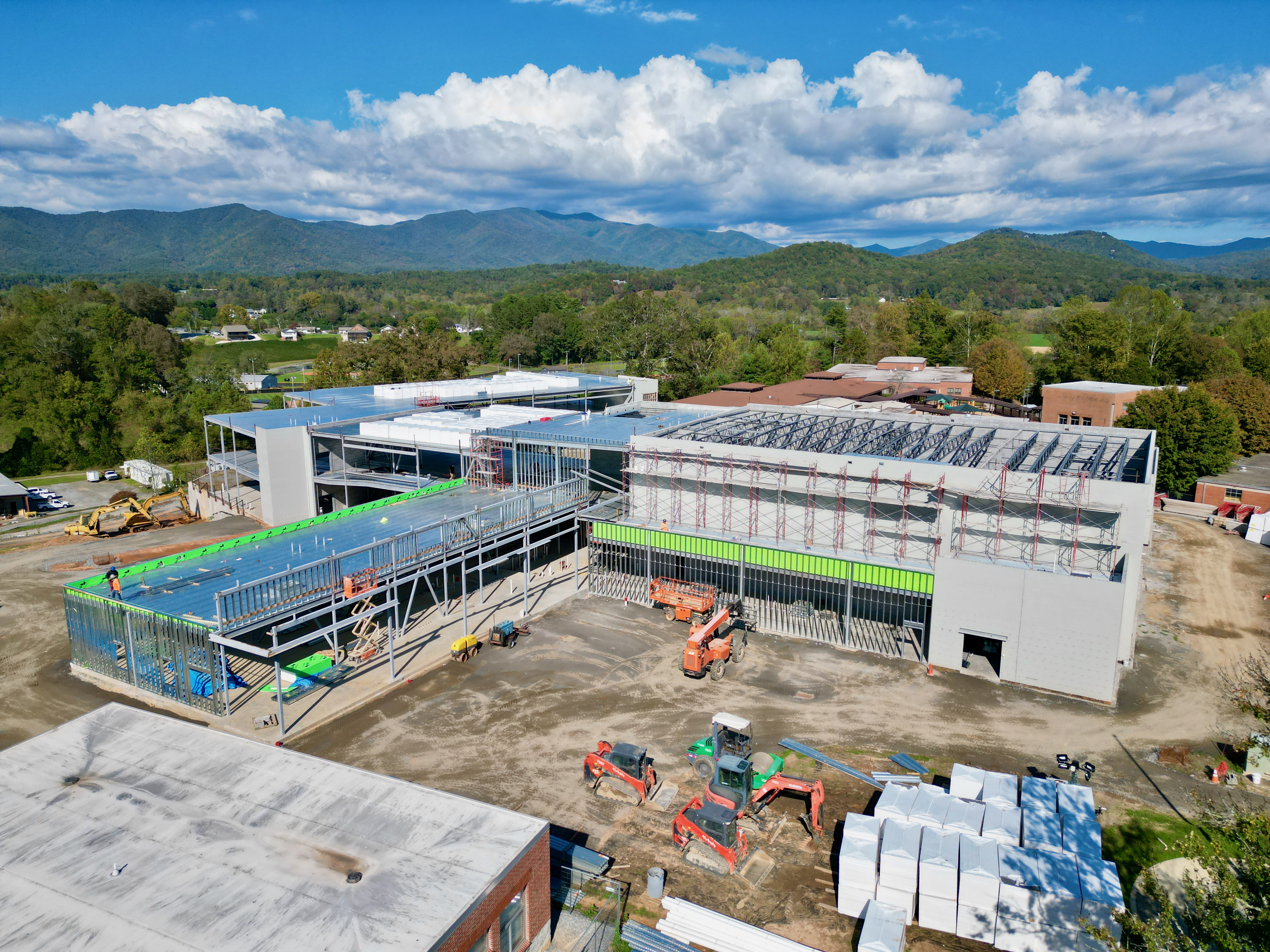
Hayesville Intermediate School under construction in October 2025.

The old elementary school building was demolished in 2021. In May 2022, Clay County Schools announced plans for a new structure that will house grades 3-8; a new gym for Hayesville Middle School; a cafeteria to serve grades 3-12 and a new performing arts center. The Hayesville Intermediate School project broke ground in July 2024 and the campus auditorium was demolished shortly thereafter to make room. The new complex is expected to open in January 2027. Starting with the 2024-2025 academic year, all Clay County Schools students were provided with free breakfast and lunch due to a federal grant established by the Healthy, Hunger-Free Kids Act of 2010. Cocaine was found on campus for the first time in spring 2026. In late 2026, Clay County Schools banned students from taking or sharing photos, audio, or videos of employees or other students without consent of the subjects, except at public functions.

== Superintendents ==
1. T.H. Nancock (1897–1898)
2. George M. Flemming
3. Col. Green Henderson Haigler
4. D.M. Stalling
5. T. Carl Scroggs (1916–1921)
6. Allen J. Bell (1921–1956)
7. Hugh Scott Beal (1956–1973)
8. Edward Phillips (1973–1976)
9. Kyle Beal (1976–1980)
10. D. Scott Penland (1980–2019)
11. Dale Cole (2019–2023)
12. D. Scott Penland (2023 interim)
13. Melissa Godfrey (2023–present)
