= Tusquittee, North Carolina =

Unincorporated community in North Carolina, US

Coordinates: 35.1194204°N 83.7411631°W

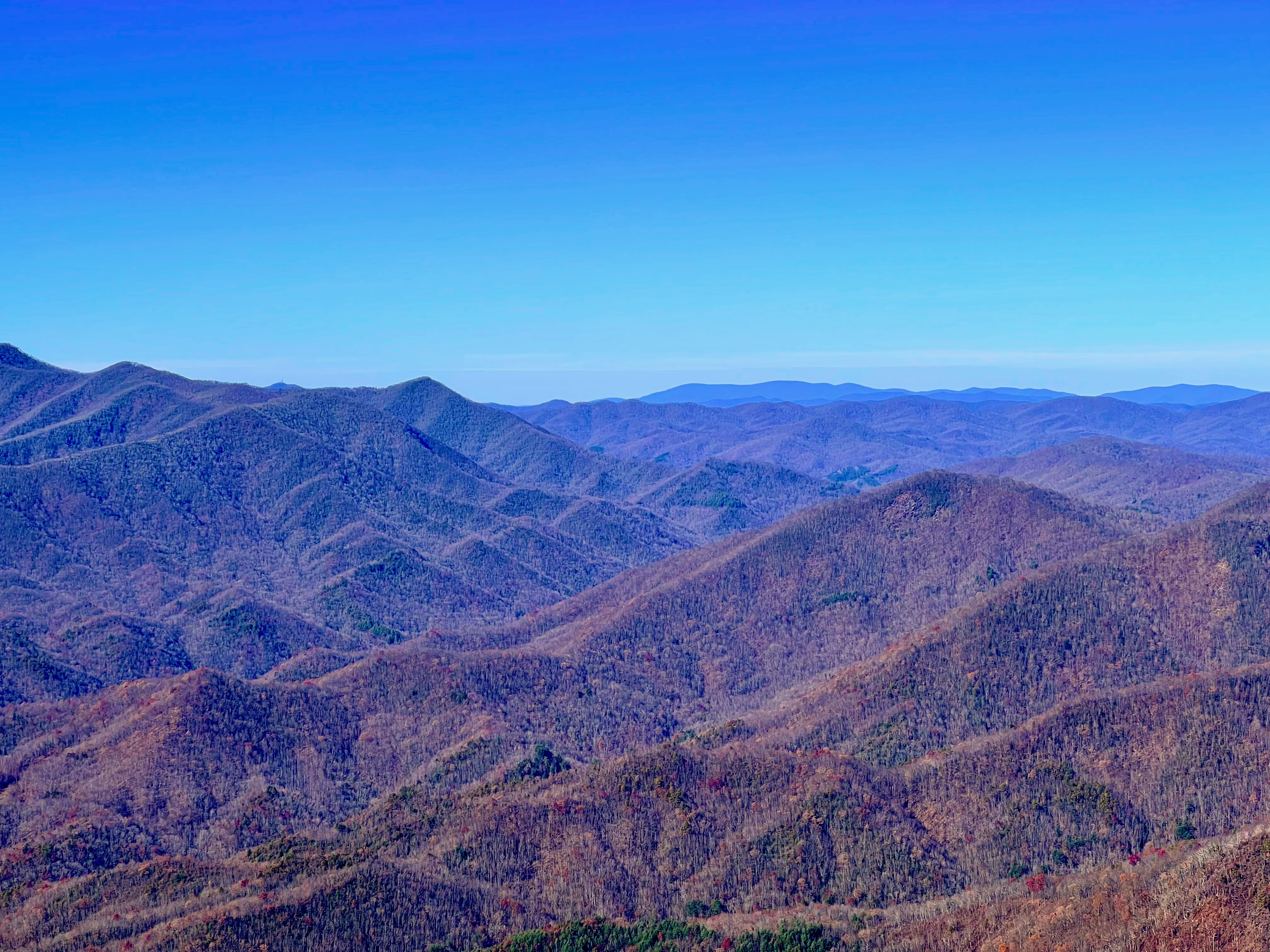
The Tusquittee mountain range in Clay County, North Carolina

Tusquittee (originally Tusquitee) is an unincorporated community located in Clay County, North Carolina, United States. It is bordered on the north by Fires Creek Bear Reserve, which is within the Nantahala National Forest. The Tusquitee Mountain range includes Tusquitee Bald at 5,240 feet.

== History ==
Tusquitee is a Cherokee Native American word meaning "Where the water-dogs laughed." (A Water Dog, sometimes also called mud-puppy, is a type of salamander.) According to folklore, a Cherokee hunter was crossing over Tusquitee Bald in a very dry season. He heard voices, crept silently toward them, peeped over a rock, and witnessed two water-dogs walking together along the trail on their hind legs and talking as they went. Their pond was dried up and they were on the way to the Nantahala River. As the hunter listened, one said to the other, "Where's the water? I'm so thirsty that my apron (gills) hangs down," and then both water-dogs laughed.

Around 1833, John Covington Moore, who was Clay County's first white settler and an early county commissioner, built his home in Tusquittee. The house was listed on the National Register of Historic Places in 1983. John Moore and his partner James Shearer opened a gold mine in Tusquittee in the late 1800s, which remained in operation through the 1930s. John Moore's home was likely moved to the Tusquittee Pioneer Village in the mid-1990s. Another cabin built before the Civil War, the Abner S. Moore House, was moved in 1975 to the Foxfire Museum and Heritage Center in Mountain City, Georgia, where it remains on display.

There is a subdivision in Tusquittee called Tusquittee Landing which incorporates a 2700 foot grass airstrip. Most people assume the "Landing" refers to the airplanes landing. However, it actually is a carryover from the days where the mules dragged logs down from the forest to a landing on Goldmine Creek. The logs were then moved down the creek to Tusquittee Creek and eventually to the sawmill.

In the late 1870s and early 1880s the Tusquittee Turnpike ran from Clay County to the Nantahala River in Macon County. The toll road cost 25 cents per wagon and 5 cents per horseman, though Gospel ministers could travel for free. From 1872 to 1874, the Tusquittee valley had its own U.S. post office, operated by postmaster James W. Shearer. In 1875, Clay County's oldest continuously operating business, Tiger's Store, opened in Tusquittee. The store, owned by Peter N. Tiger, moved to Hayesville around 1908, where it remains.

Tusquittee was the home of Lillith Lidseen, an actress who moved to the area from Chicago in the 1950s. Lidseen built the Peacock Performing Arts Center in nearby Hayesville. She raised peacocks on property connected to Tusquittee Road and the theatre was named for her favorite animal.

Tusquittee Pioneer Village was constructed in 1993 by farmer Garnett “Johnny” Nelson, his wife Kathleen, and Gordon Parris, in Nelson's backyard. The village was inspired by a visit to Cades Cove. The site consisted of around 17 structures (13 historic in nature), including homes, a barn, smokehouse, blacksmith shop, post office, outhouse, and chapel. Many of the structures were erected by slaves before the Civil War. Several couples wed at the village, though the attraction closed in 1996 when the Nelsons died.
