= Hayesville High School =

American public school in North Carolina

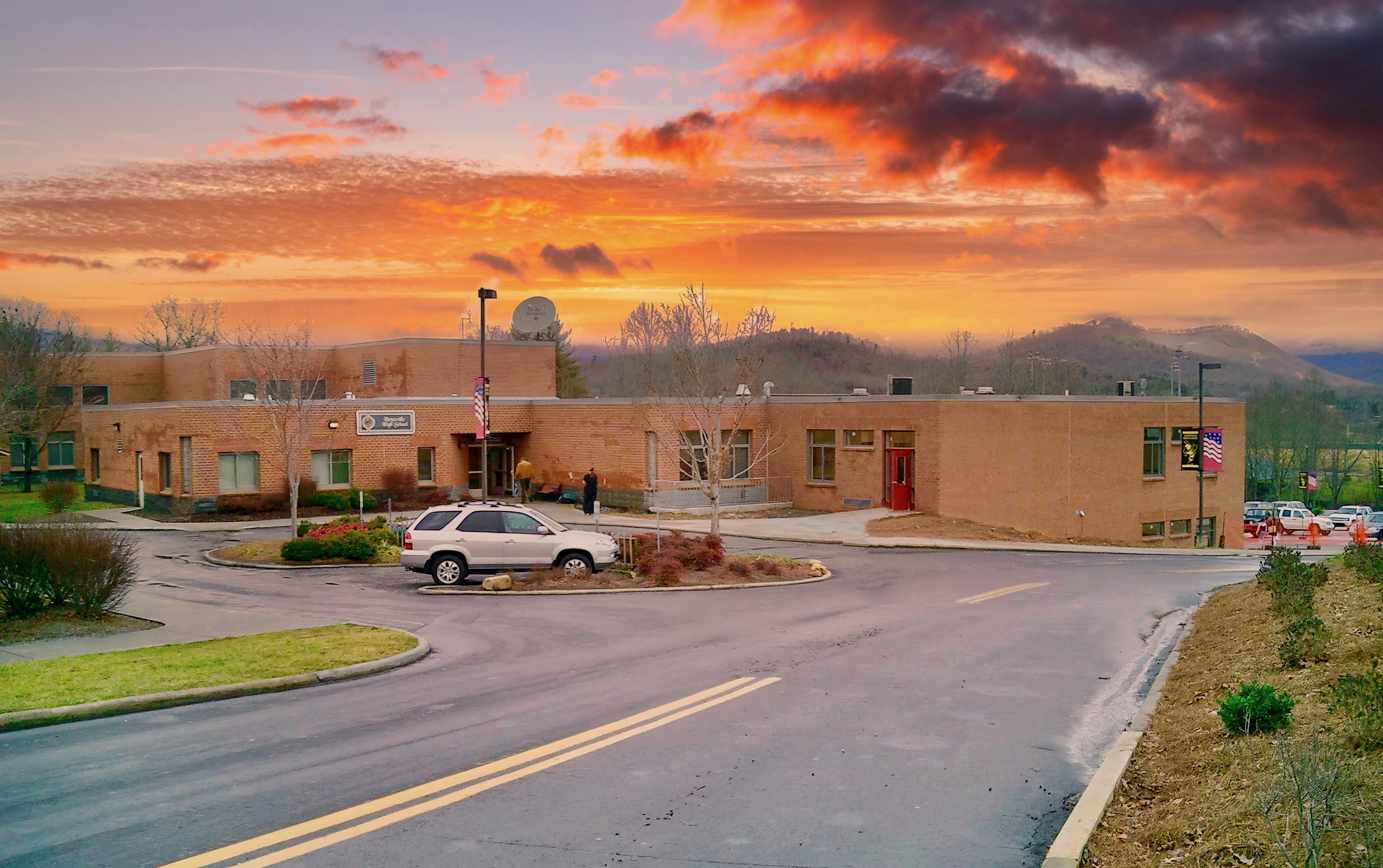
- Hayesville High in Clay County, NC

Location
- 205 Yellow Jacket Drive; Hayesville, North Carolina 28904; United States; 35°02′27″N 83°48′58″W

Information
- School type: Public
- School district: Clay County School District
- CEEB code: 341745
- Principal: Stacey Overlin
- Staff: 44
- Teaching staff: 33
- Grades: 9–12
- Gender: Co-education
- Enrollment: 371 (2024-25)
- Student to teacher ratio: 12.64
- Colors: Black and gold
- Slogan: Chasing Excellence
- Athletics conference: Smoky Mountain Conference
- Mascot: Yellow Jacket
- Newspaper: The Buzz
- Website: www.hayesvillehs.org

Hayesville High School is a school located in Hayesville, North Carolina and is part of the Clay County School District. It is the only public high school in Clay County. As of 2024, the school's enrollment is 371 students and it has 33 teaching staff members. That is an average of 10.27 students per teacher. As of 2026, Clay County Schools' graduation rate is among the top 20 in the state.

The school moved into its current two-story brick facility in 1991. A new gymnasium was added in 1999. The cafeteria was built in 1966.

== Athletics ==
Hayesville's teams are known as the Yellow Jackets. The school's main rival is Murphy High School. Football and track events are held at Frank R. Long Memorial Stadium. Hayesville competes in the Smoky Mountain Conference (SMC) and its varsity sports are:

- Baseball
  - State champs - 1983, 1988
- Basketball
  - Boys state champs - 2004, 2022
  - Girls state champs - 1988, 1989, 1990, 1991, 1992, 1993
- Cross Country
  - Boys state champs - 2005, 2008
  - Girls state champs - 1993, 1999, 2003, 2004, 2005, 2006
- Football
- Golf
- Softball
- Soccer
- Track and field
  - Girls state champs - 1994, 1996
- Volleyball
- Wrestling

== History ==
After local school teacher John Hicks was elected as the first representative from Clay County to the North Carolina General Assembly, he purchased land near Hayesville on Aug. 12, 1870, to establish a school, Hicksville Academy. The school boarded students and charged tuition in a framed, two-story building.

In 1887, Hicksville Academy was sold to the Methodist-Episcopal church and its name was changed to Hayesville Academy. In 1891, the school's management was turned over to Trinity College in Durham, which later became Duke University. Courses were offered from the first grade through college, and Hayesville Academy was again renamed, this time to Hayesville Male and Female College. Tuition cost $1–2 per month and student housing cost 25 cents per month. At that time, 225 students were enrolled from six different states. In 1898 the school changed ownership again.

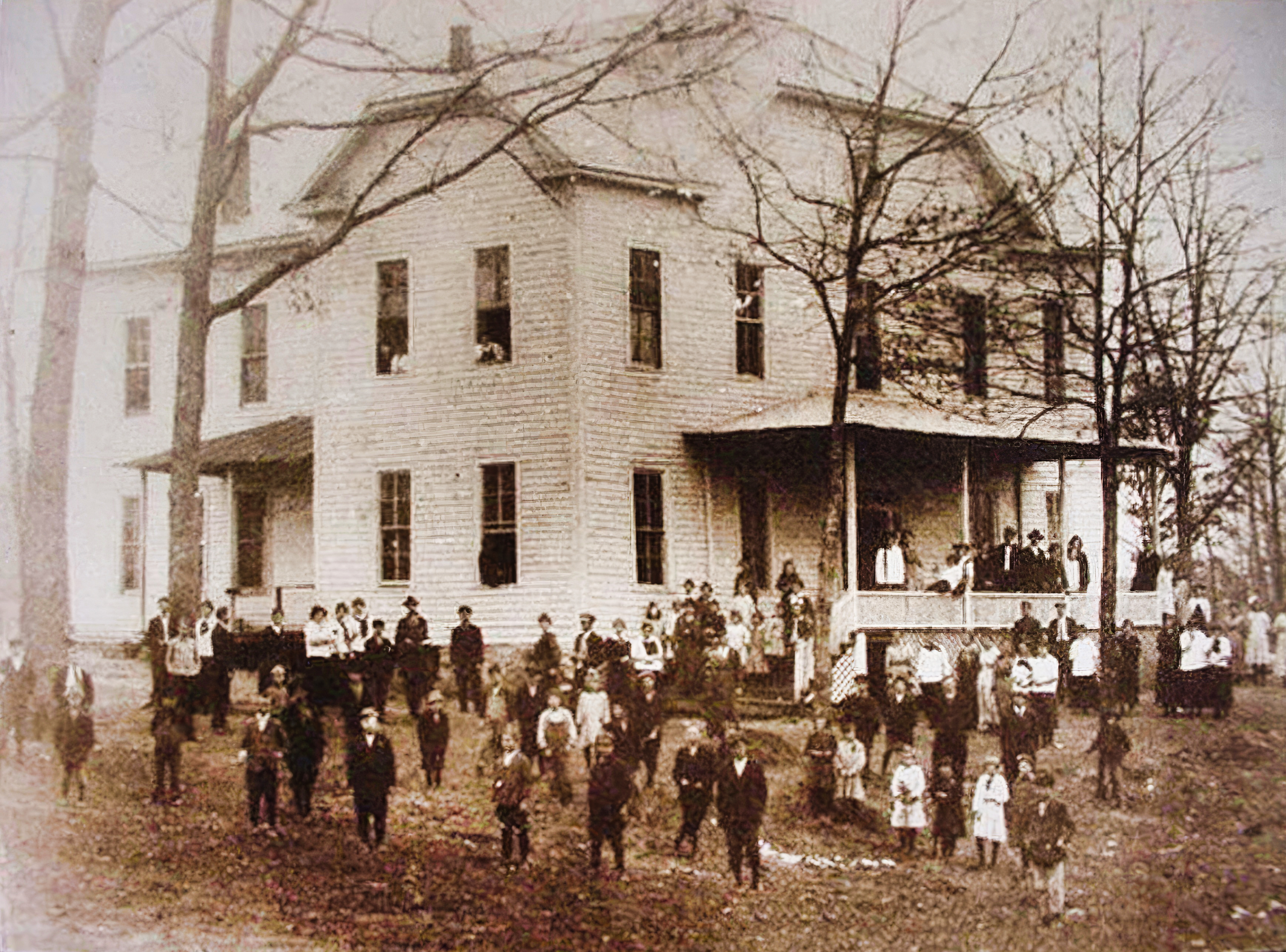
Hayesville High School in the early 1900s

The school continued to board students through the 1909-10 school year. Sometime prior to 1909, the name of the school was changed to Hayesville High School. Hayesville High School received accreditation in 1924. That same year, its two-story wooden frame building was demolished and replaced with a new $36,000 brick schoolhouse. The brick building was the first school in the county to feature indoor plumbing and running water, which was supplied by an on-campus well.

On August 6, 1928, the school stopped charging tuition and became free for all county students.

By 1929, Hayesville High had 11 teachers and approximately 500 students.

That same year, the school fielded a football team; it was undefeated in its opening season.

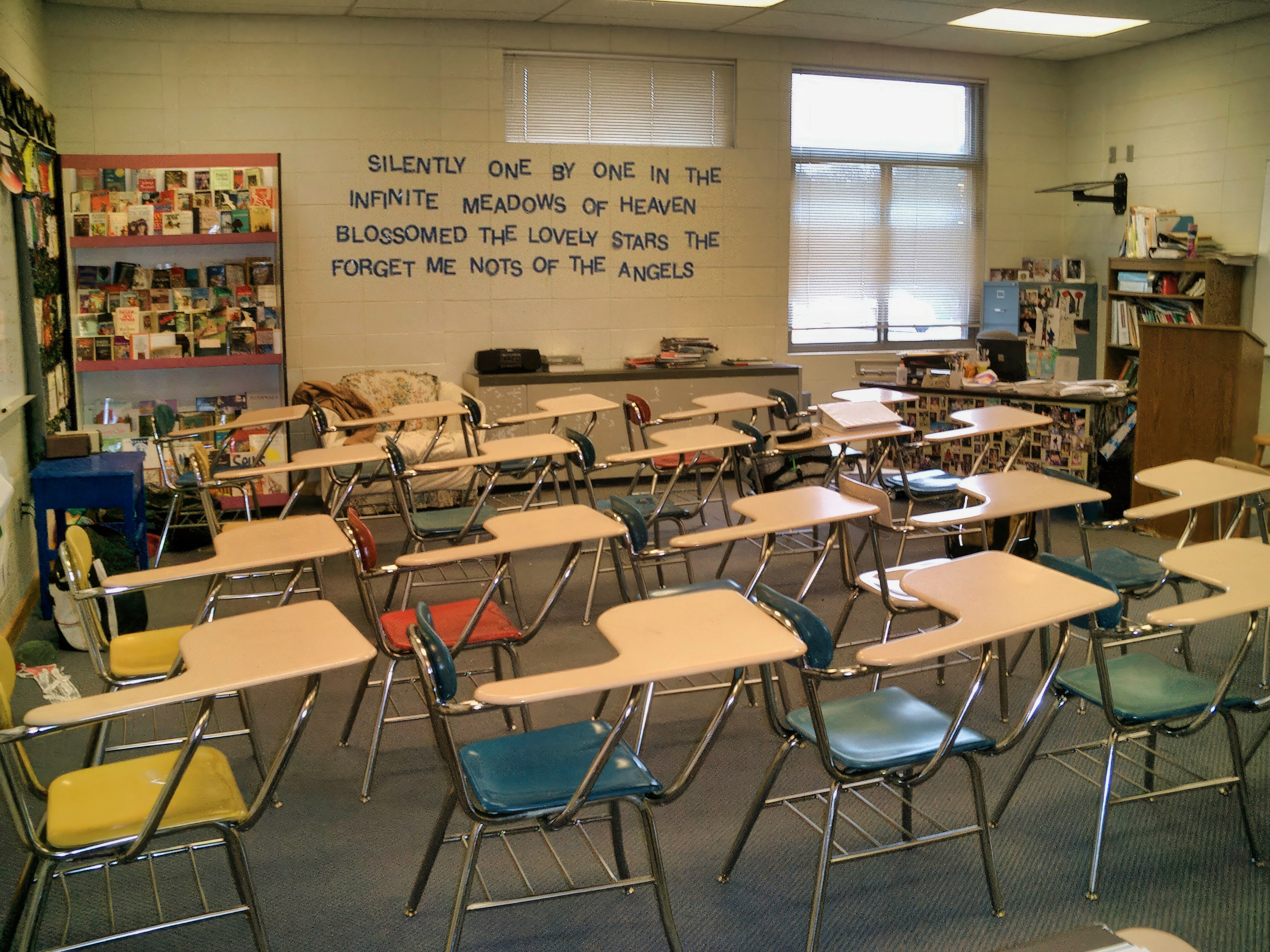
A Hayesville High School classroom in 2004

After Ogden and Elf schools shifted focus to elementary students, Hayesville was the only high school in the county from 1937 on.

In the 1940s and 50s, traveling music groups including Lester Flat and Earl Scruggs, Carl Story, Minnie Pearl, and Hank Williams performed at Hayesville High.

A new school was constructed in 1950, and the old brick schoolhouse was demolished the following year. The new school began using water from the town of Hayesville. A gymnasium was built in 1957. In the 1950s the school added 14 acres of land (including an athletic field), a custodian's home, and a brick auditorium.

In 1972, Hayesville High's shop class students built a new jail for Clay County in Hayesville. This was in use until it was replaced in 2008. In the 1980s, Hayesville High's trade and industrial classes built homes that were auctioned off by the board of education. From 1988 to 1989, the school's vocational carpentry class built the octagonal gazebo stage on the town square next to the Clay County Courthouse.

Hayesville High School served students in grades 7-12 until the creation of Hayesville Middle School in 1989. At that point, HHS began serving grades 9-12. In 1991, the high school moved into its current two-story brick facility, which was designed by 1953 Hayesville High School graduate James Padgett of Padgett and Freeman Architects. Padgett's firm designed many of the buildings and additions on campus.

In 2008, the campus track was named the Buck Carney Track in honor of the school's most successful track and cross country coach, Elda Homer Carney.

Hayesville High School's auditorium was demolished in the summer of 2024, to make room for a new middle school and performing arts center that is expected to open in January 2027.

In 2025, the high school's gym was renamed the Darryl K. McClure Gymnasium in honor of its longtime girls' basketball coach. Cocaine was found on campus for the first time in 2026.

== Principals ==
- John O. Hicks (1870–)
- N.A. Fessenden (1879–)
- Dr. Neal T. Kitchens (c. 1886)
- H.P. Bailey (c. 1889–1890)
- Rev. W.H. Bailey (c. 1891)
- L.F. Shuford
- D.M. Stallings (c. 1909–1912)
- Walter F. McCandless (1912–1913)
- E.L. Adams (1913–1922)
- H. Victor Bailey (1922–1923)
- Allen J. Bell (1923)
- Baxter C. Jones (1923–1926)
- Andrew Harvey Shuler (1926–1928)
- T.C. Lingerfeldt (1928–1930)
- L.L. Shealey (1930–1931)
- William Arthur Young (1931–1934)
- Carl Dan Killian (1934–1935)
- Samuel B. Churchwell (1935–1939)
- Ralph Lynn Smith (1939–1948)
- J. Walter Moore (1943–1946)
- Hugh Scott Beal (1946–1956)
- Guy H. Wheeler (1956–1970)
- Jack R. Rogers (1970–c. 1976)
- Charles F. Carroll, who later became N.C. state superintendent of education
- Richard Jones (1979–1985)
- David Davies (1985 – c. 1988)
- Gail Criss (c. 1997–2005)
- Matt Rogers (c. 2008)
- Mickey Noe (2014–2018)
- Catherine Andrews (c. 2019)
- Jim Saltz (c. 2020–2021)
- Stacey Overlin (2021–present)
