= Hayesville, North Carolina =

- Town
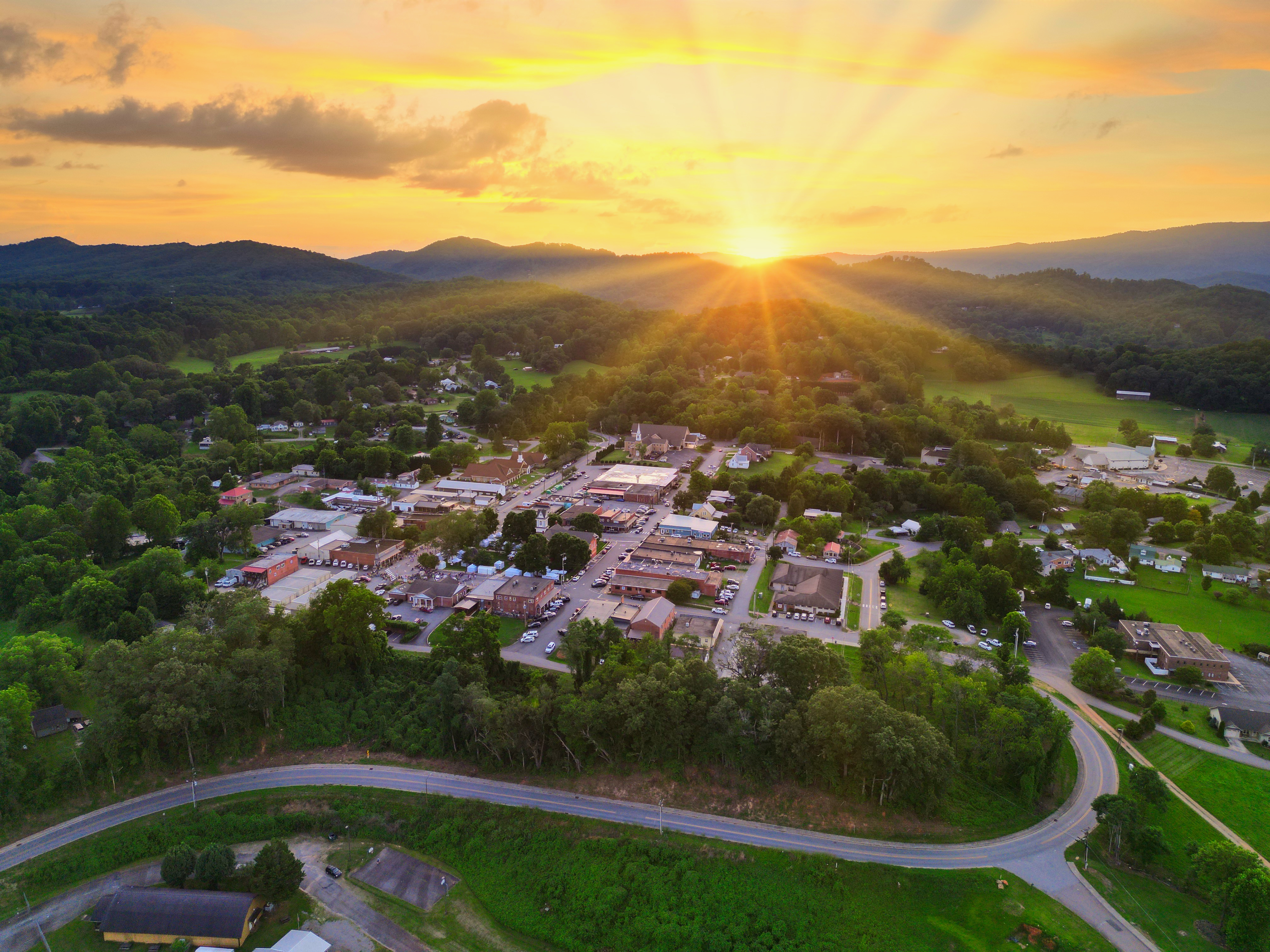
- Downtown Hayesville

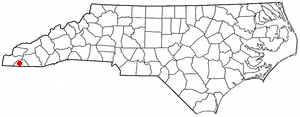
- Location of Hayesville, North Carolina
- Coordinates: 35°02′42″N 83°49′05″W
- Country: United States
- State: North Carolina
- County: Clay

Area
  - Total: 0.64 sq mi (1.65 km^{2})
  - Land: 0.64 sq mi (1.65 km^{2})
  - Water: 0 sq mi (0.00 km^{2})
- Elevation: 1,890 ft (580 m)

Population (2020)
  - Total: 461
  - Density: 724.8/sq mi (279.84/km^{2})
- Time zone: UTC-5 (Eastern (EST))
  - Summer (DST): UTC-4 (EDT)
- ZIP code: 28904
- Area code: 828
- FIPS code: 37-30280
- GNIS feature ID: 2405807
- Website: www.townofhayesville.com

Hayesville is a town in Clay County, North Carolina, United States. As of the 2020 census, Hayesville had a population of 461. It is the county seat of Clay County.

== History ==
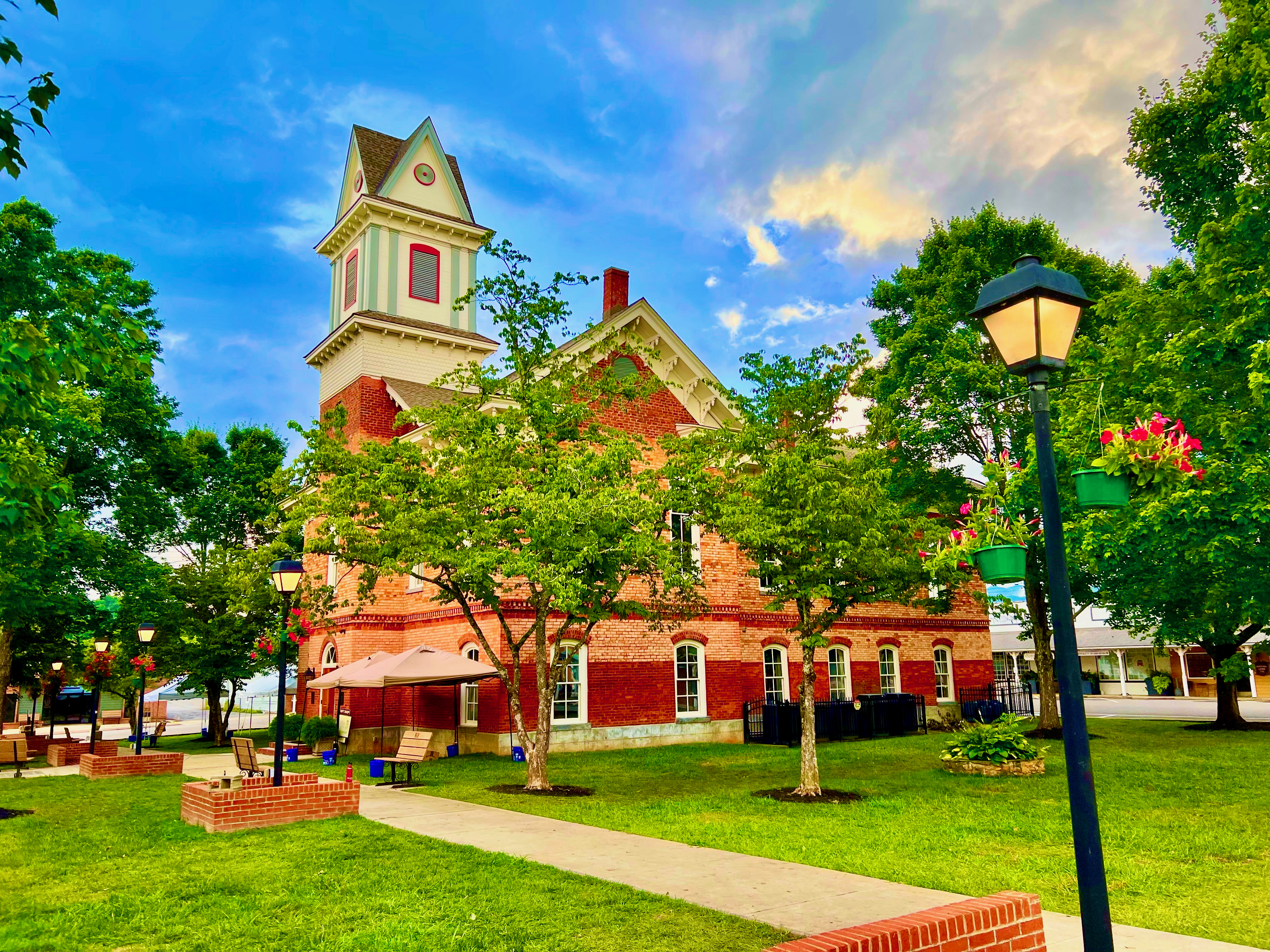
The Clay County Courthouse on the Hayesville square is listed on the National Register of Historic Places

=== Quanassee ===
This was long an area of indigenous settlement along the Hiwassee River. An earthwork platform mound was built here, likely by people of the South Appalachian Mississippian culture about 1000 CE. It would have been the center of their village.

Later, the historic Cherokee developed a town known as Quanassee at this site. They built their townhouse on top of the mound, to provide a place for communal discussion and reaching consensus. It was one of the numerous "Valley Towns" located along the Hiwassee River in Western North Carolina. It was also along the Trading Path (also called the "Unicoi Turnpike"). That road led from Quanassee west to another town at present-day Murphy, North Carolina, then over the Unicoi Range at Unicoi Gap and down to the Cherokee town of Great Tellico (today Tellico Plains, Tennessee).

Quanassee had several hundred inhabitants by 1550. In 1716, South Carolina officials met with Cherokee leaders in Quanassee to obtain the Cherokee's alliance in the Yamassee War. The next year South Carolina built a trading site in Quanassee to gain Cherokee commodities like deerskins in exchange for manufactured English goods. A Coosa (Creek) war party "cut off" Quanassee in 1725, demolishing the village and enslaving or killing most of its residents. The town was briefly reestablished before the American Revolution; Rutherford expedition forces camped there in 1776. In the 1820s, Baptist missionaries visited Quanassee to preach to families living there.

=== Fort Hembree ===
In October 1837, Tennessee militia established Fort Hembree near Hayesville to prepare for deporting the Cherokee. Approximately 1,000 Cherokee people were held prisoner at the fort and removed from the area. The military abandoned Fort Hembree in June 1838, though it was reactivated in 1860 to train soldiers for the Civil War.

After the Cherokee were forced to cede their land, European Americans settled in this rural area and took over what is now known as the Spikebuck Town Mound and Village Site. They cultivated much of the village site, disturbing the topsoil layers. Some excavations were conducted in the 1960s and 1970s. The town mound and village site was listed in 1982 on the National Register of Historic Places as an archeological site.

Clay County acquired the mound site in 2000 and protects it; the Archeological Conservancy acquired the town/village site and farmsteads in 2011.

=== Hayesville founded ===
The town was named Hayesville after 19th-century politician George Hayes. When running for representative from Cherokee County in the fall election of 1860, he learned that residents in the southeast end wanted to separate from Cherokee County and get their own county seat, because of the difficulty of traveling to the distant location. With the promise to introduce legislation to this effect, Hayes won a seat in the legislature. In February 1861 the legislation to organize a new county was introduced and passed by the North Carolina General Assembly. The county was named in honor of Kentucky statesman Henry Clay, and the county seat Hayesville, for Hayes. Though Hayesville was an active town since 1861 and town limits were set in 1882, it was not incorporated until March 12, 1913. The first mayor was S.E. Hogsed. The small town of Hayesville became county seat instead of Fort Hembree mainly because whiskey was too easily available to soldiers at the fort.

Hayesville High School was founded in 1870 as Hicksville Academy. In the 1890s it was bought by Duke University and offered college courses. After the first wood-frame county courthouse in Hayesville was destroyed by arson in 1870, the brick courthouse currently standing on the town square was constructed in 1888. It is listed on the National Register of Historic Places. In mid-2007, courthouse operations moved to a new justice center built 1 mile (1.6 km) west of downtown.

Hayesville's Methodist and Presbyterian churches were the earliest churches in Clay County; both congregations date to 1838. Their present buildings opened in 1943 and 1960 respectively. Truett Memorial, the town's first Baptist church, dates to 1850; its extant stone building opened in 1949.

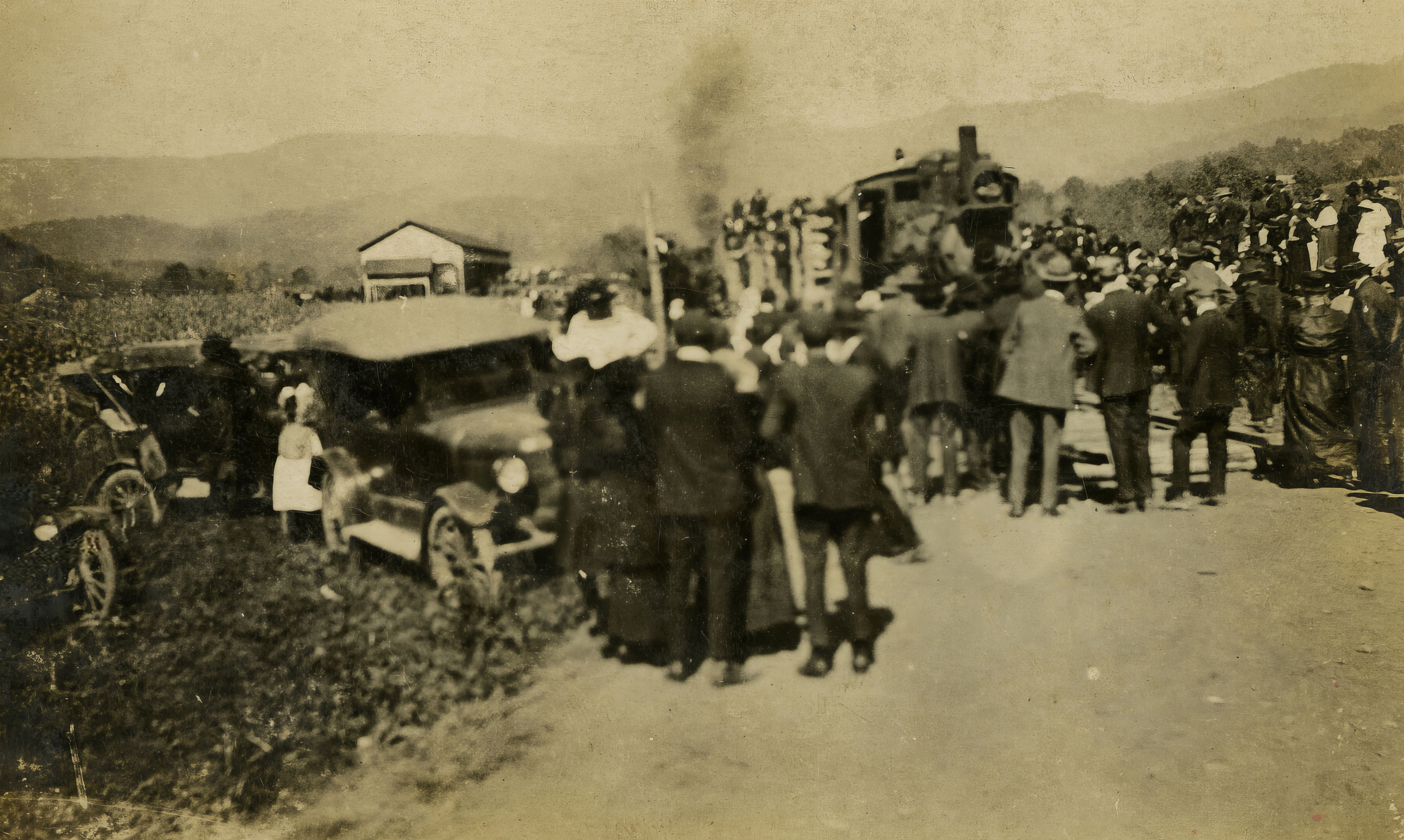
The first train from Hayesville arrives at Tusquittee station in 1920

Hayesville's post office opened May 7, 1868. The county's first official bank opened in Hayesville on May 18, 1910. In October 1920 the railroad came to Hayesville. The Peavine line was completed to Andrews, North Carolina, where it connected with the Southern Railway. The line hauled mainly lumber and was dismantled in 1951.

Tiger's Store downtown is thought to be the oldest continuously operating business in Clay County. It was established in 1875 in Tusquittee and moved to Hayesville around 1908. Hotels began appearing in Hayesville in the 1920s. Clay County had a silent film theater in the 1920s. Later, the Hayesville Theater operated from the 1940s to the 1960s and live music was performed after film showings. Traveling music groups including Lester Flat and Earl Scruggs, Carl Story, Minnie Pearl, and Hank Williams performed at Hayesville High School in the 1940s and 50s. In 1945, Paul Westmoreland debuted his song "Detour (There's a Muddy Road Ahead)" in Hayesville. He wrote the song while on his way to Murphy. As of 2024, there are no movie theaters in Clay County.

On January 22, 1922, a midnight fire destroyed nearly all of downtown Hayesville, including several stores, the highway commission office and records, and the U.S. Post Office. The fire started at DeWease's Hardware Store and was reportedly set intentionally to collect insurance money. The town's current post office building was constructed in 1965.

=== Late 20th century to present ===
Clay County is featuring Cherokee heritage sites as part of its community redevelopment to emphasize its unique character. In addition to the Spikebuck Town Mound, it supports other Cherokee resources in Hayesville: the Quanassee Path, which highlights five Cherokee features on a walking path around Hayesville; the Cherokee Homestead Exhibit, with reconstructions of traditional summer and winter houses and a corn crib; and the Cherokee Botanical Sanctuary. In addition the CCCRA sponsors an annual Cherokee Heritage Festival.

Clay County's public library started in a small room on the second floor of a building on Hayesville's town square. At some point it moved to a small room in the county courthouse. In 1940 it became part of the Nantahala Regional Library system and hired its first librarian, Ellen Scroggs, in 1943. A new $80,000 library building opened on Sanderson St. downtown on June 25, 1967. It was named in honor of local-born Dr. Fred A. Moss, who contributed $10,000 towards its construction and donated books. Today Moss Memorial Library is the only public library in Clay County.

In the early 1940s Chatuge Dam was constructed near Hayesville by the Tennessee Valley Authority, creating Chatuge Lake. It was the tallest earthen dam in the world until the Aswan Dam was built in Egypt in 1964. In 2017, the dam was listed on the National Register of Historic Places.

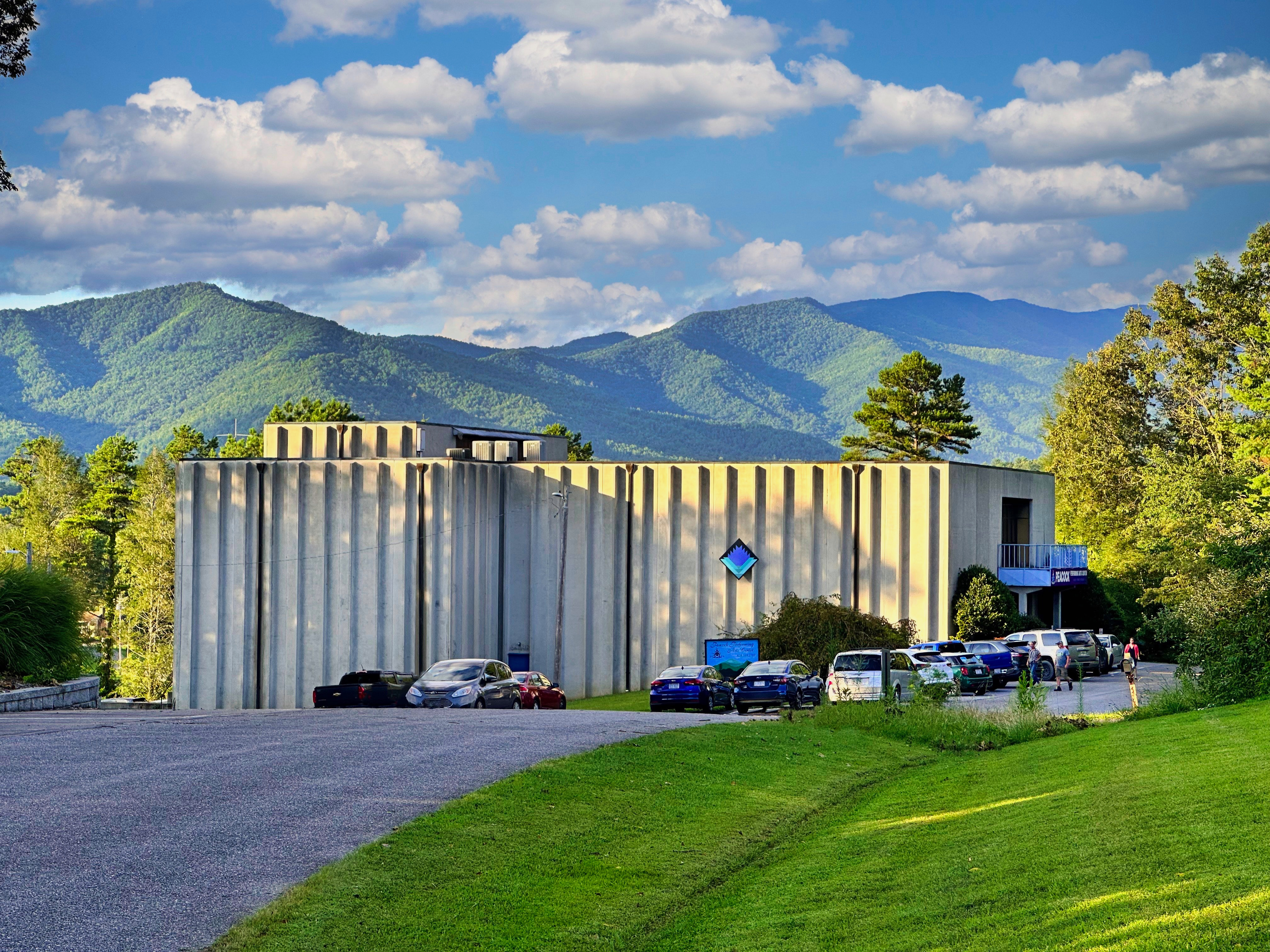
The Peacock Performing Arts Center in Hayesville

Hayesville's annual Festival on the Square began in 1980. The town's annual Christmas parade began in 1987. Despite being a small town, in the 1980s Hayesville gained the only community theatre in far-west North Carolina. The Peacock Playhouse was constructed on Church Street by Lillith Lidseen. Born in Sweden in 1904, Lidseen moved with her parents to Chicago and studied fine arts at Wellesley College. After her brother Edwin established a pipe manufacturing business in Warne, she moved nearby. Nonprofit volunteer organization the Licklog Players (named after the local Licklog Creek) began performing shows at Hayesville High School's auditorium in 1978 and Lidseen was asked to direct Brigadoon. Due to the community's enthusiastic response, she decided that the area needed a professional theatre venue and built a three-story, 250-seat playhouse near downtown. Plans were drawn up in March 1981 and construction began in 1983. The first show performed at the theatre was The Curious Savage by the Licklog Players on June 6, 1986. Lidseen died in January 1987 before she was able to see a production in her theatre. The Lilith Lidseen Performing Arts Association was formed in 2007. It raised $800,000 to buy the building in 2009 and renovate it. After performing more than 100 plays at the venue, the Licklog Players moved to a strip mall and shut down after their 2014 season. Today the Peacock Performing Arts Center offers dozens of events per year, ranging from comedies to concerts.

In 2003 the US 64 bypass through Hayesville was expanded into a four-lane highway. NC 69 from Hayesville to Georgia was widened to four lanes in 2024. The Clay County Recreation Center was built in 2007 in Hayesville and it was expanded in 2013. Historic Hayesville, Inc., an organization dedicated to restoring the town, launched in 2013. In 2017, Reader's Digest named Hayesville one of the top ten nicest places in America.

== Government ==
The town of Hayesville has 290 registered voters as of 2025. Of those, 49 are Democrats, 138 are Republicans, 2 are Libertarians, and 101 are unaffiliated. Municipal elections are held in odd-numbered years.

=== Mayoral history ===
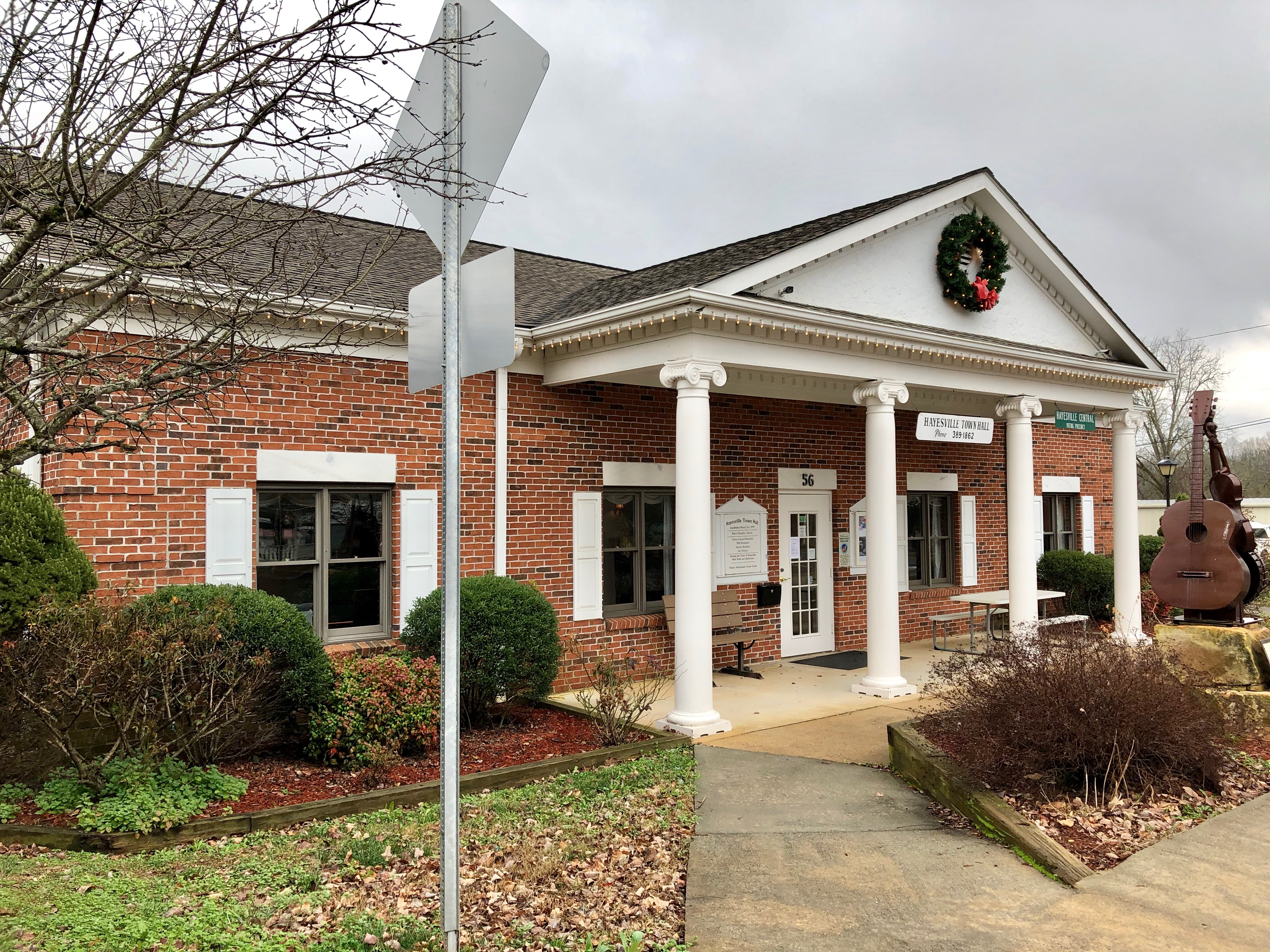
Town hall

1. S.E. Hogsed (1913)
2. Wm. H. Harrison (1913–1914)
3. W.T. Hunt Sr. (1915)
4. G.H. Haigler (1915–1917)
5. T.C. Scroggs (1919)
6. J.B. Gray (1920–1922)
7. O.L. Anderson (1923)
8. Neal Haigler (1924)
9. R.E. Crawford (1925)
10. W. J. Winchester (1929)
11. James Penalnd (1936)
12. W.L. Matheson (1937)
13. T.C. Gray (1938–1946)
14. Fred D. Pass (1947–1948)
15. Glenn Byers (1948–1951)
16. H.M. Crawford (1953)
17. Christine Prater (1955)
18. James H. Walker (1957–1961)
19. Donald S. Weaver (1962–1966)
20. M. Cloe Moore (1967–1969)
21. C.A. Carroll (1970–1972)
22. Paul "Bud" Vaught Jr. (1973–1998)
23. Gwen Weaver (1999–2003)
24. Harrell Moore (2004–2012)
25. Harry Baughn (2013–2021)
26. Joe Slaton (2021–2025)
27. Benita England (2025–present)

== Education ==
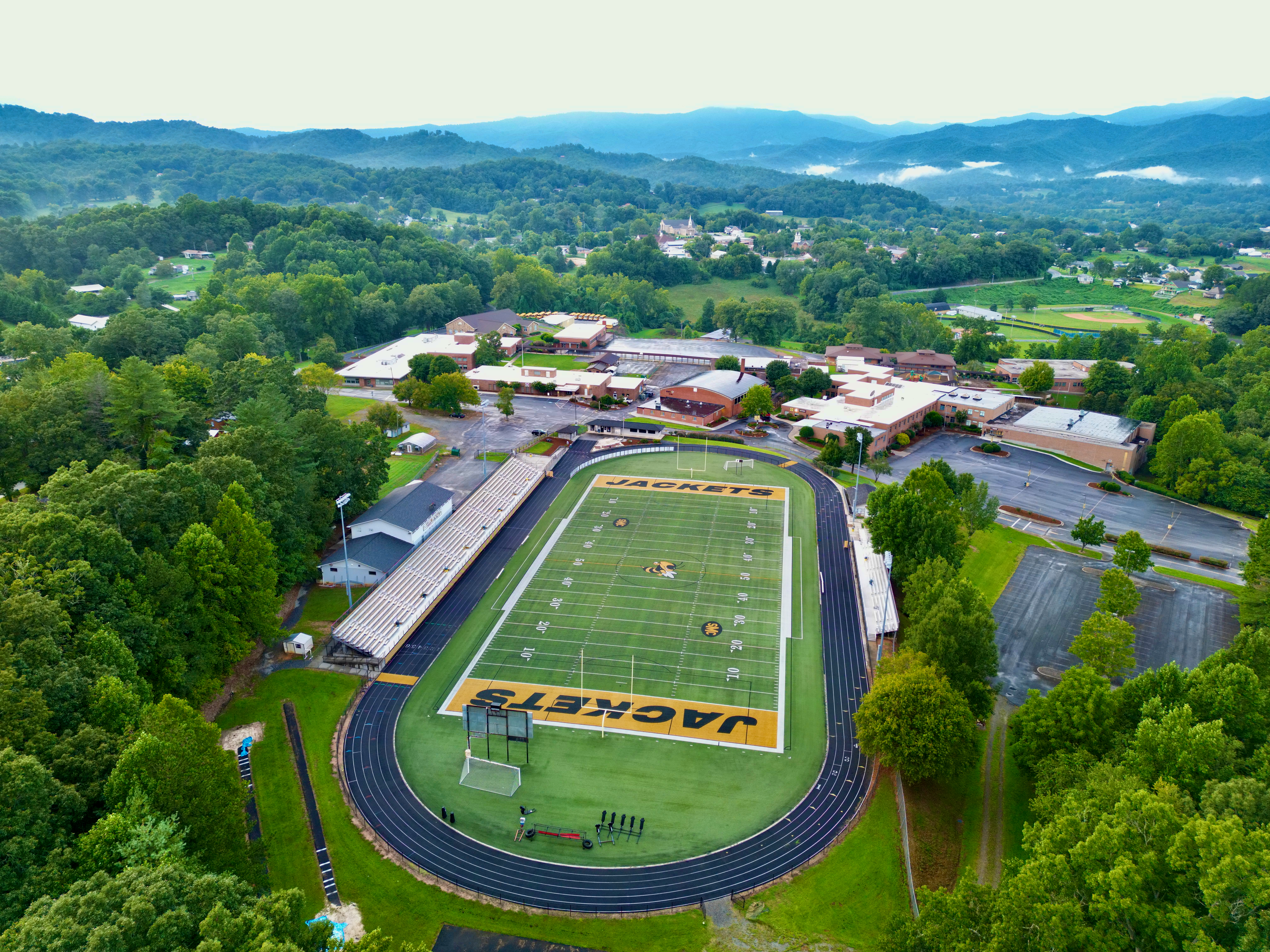
All Clay County public schools operate on a single campus in Hayesville

The local public school system is run by Clay County Schools, which operates four separate schools located on a central campus in Hayesville:

- Hayesville High School
- Hayesville Middle School
- Hayesville Elementary School
- Hayesville Primary School

The schools serve about 1,200 students total.

Higher education is offered nearby at Tri-County Community College, Young Harris College, and Western Carolina University. As of 2023, approximately 19 percent of Hayesville residents have a bachelor's degree or higher, compared to 37 percent of residents statewide.

The oldest and largest folk school in the United States, the John C. Campbell Folk School, is located in Brasstown, an unincorporated community that exists partly in Cherokee County and partly in Clay County. The school focuses on creative folk arts for all ages and offers community dance and concert entertainment.

== Healthcare ==
Hayesville and all of Clay County is served by the 57-bed Erlanger Western Carolina Hospital in nearby Peachtree and Chatuge Regional Hospital across the Georgia state line in Hiawassee.

As of 2023, approximately 19 percent of Hayesville residents have disabilities, compared to 14 percent of residents statewide. About 17 percent of Hayesville residents do not have health insurance, compared to 9 percent statewide.

== Geography ==
According to the United States Census Bureau, the town has a total area of 0.4 square miles (1.0 km^{2}), all land. Hayesville is located 3.9 miles (6.3 km) from the U.S. state of Georgia and 2.4 miles (3.9 km) from Chatuge Lake. The Hiwassee River flows along the outskirts of Hayesville. In 2026, TVA released a map showing that approximately 200 structures around Hayesville would be flooded in the event that Chatuge Dam failed.

== Climate ==
According to the Köppen climate classification, Hayesville has a humid subtropical climate, with cool winters and hot summers.

Climate data for Hayesville, North Carolina(1991-2020 normals)
Month	Jan	Feb	Mar	Apr	May	Jun	Jul	Aug	Sep	Oct	Nov	Dec	Year
Mean daily maximum °F (°C)	49.0 (9.4)	54.0 (12.2)	60.1 (15.6)	69.1 (20.6)	75.4 (24.1)	81.2 (27.3)	84.3 (29.1)	83.5 (28.6)	79.1 (26.2)	70.4 (21.3)	60.1 (15.6)	52.1 (11.2)	68.2 (20.1)
Daily mean °F (°C)	36.7 (2.6)	40.4 (4.7)	46.7 (8.2)	54.3 (12.4)	63.0 (17.2)	69.9 (21.1)	73.3 (22.9)	72.3 (22.4)	66.9 (19.4)	56.5 (13.6)	46.3 (7.9)	39.9 (4.4)	55.5 (13.1)
Mean daily minimum °F (°C)	24.4 (−4.2)	26.7 (−2.9)	33.3 (0.7)	39.5 (4.2)	50.5 (10.3)	58.6 (14.8)	62.3 (16.8)	61.1 (16.2)	54.7 (12.6)	42.6 (5.9)	32.4 (0.2)	27.7 (−2.4)	42.8 (6.0)
Source: https://www.weather.gov/wrh/Climate?wfo=mrx

== Demographics ==
Historical population
Census	Pop.	Note	%±
1870	35		—
1920	257		—
1930	305		18.7%
1940	336		10.2%
1950	356		6.0%
1960	428		20.2%
1970	428		0.0%
1980	376		−12.1%
1990	279		−25.8%
2000	297		6.5%
2010	311		4.7%
2020	461		48.2%
U.S. Decennial Census

=== 2020 census ===
Hayesville town, North Carolina – Racial and ethnic composition Note: the US Census treats Hispanic/Latino as an ethnic category. This table excludes Latinos from the racial categories and assigns them to a separate category. Hispanics/Latinos may be of any race.
Race / Ethnicity (NH = Non-Hispanic)	Pop 2000	Pop 2010	Pop 2020	% 2000	% 2010	% 2020
White alone (NH)	291	299	412	97.98%	96.14%	89.37%
Black or African American alone (NH)	1	0	6	0.34%	0.00%	1.30%
Native American or Alaska Native alone (NH)	0	3	1	0.00%	0.96%	0.22%
Asian alone (NH)	0	0	4	0.00%	0.00%	0.87%
Native Hawaiian or Pacific Islander alone (NH)	0	0	0	0.00%	0.00%	0.00%
Other race alone (NH)	0	0	4	0.00%	0.00%	0.87%
Mixed race or Multiracial (NH)	1	2	10	0.34%	0.64%	2.17%
Hispanic or Latino (any race)	4	7	24	1.35%	2.25%	5.21%
Total	297	311	461	100.00%	100.00%	100.00%

As of the 2020 United States census, there were 461 people, 161 households, and 83 families residing in the town.

=== 2010 census ===
At the census of 2010, there were 311 people, 147 households, and 84 families residing in the town. The population density was 666.6 people per square mile. There were 171 housing units at an average density of 384.7 per square mile (148.5/km^{2}). The racial makeup of the town was 99.33% White, 0.34% African American, and 0.34% from two or more races. Hispanic or Latino of any race were 1.35% of the population.

There were 147 households, out of which 21.1% had children under the age of 18 living with them, 39.5% were married couples living together, 12.9% had a female householder with no husband present, and 44.9% were non-families. 42.9% of all households were made up of individuals, and 19.0% had someone living alone who was 65 years of age or older. The average household size was 1.99 and the average family size was 2.73.

In the town, the population was spread out, with 20.5% under the age of 18, 8.1% from 18 to 24, 23.6% from 25 to 44, 23.2% from 45 to 64, and 24.6% who were 65 years of age or older. The median age was 43 years. For every 100 females, there were 85.6 males. For every 100 females age 18 and over, there were 77.4 males.

The median income for a household in the town was $20,000, and the median income for a family was $30,938. Males had a median income of $21,667 versus $16,500 for females. The per capita income for the town was $12,281. About 7.7% of families and 14.7% of the population were below the poverty line, including 7.4% of those under the age of eighteen and 8.2% of those 65 or over.

== Local cities ==
=== Nearby communities ===
This diagram has a radius of 30 km (19 mi) from Hayesville.

== Notable people ==
- Leon P. Crawford – Republican mayor of Clemson, South Carolina from 1946 to 1965
- Bob Dalsemer – Internationally known square and contra dance writer and caller
- Mark Linkous – musician of the band Sparklehorse, lived in Hayesville for a few years and operated a recording studio in the area
- George Washington Truett – Southern Baptist clergyman and 47-year pastor for the First Baptist Church of Dallas
