= Ghost light (theatre) =

Light left on in theatres

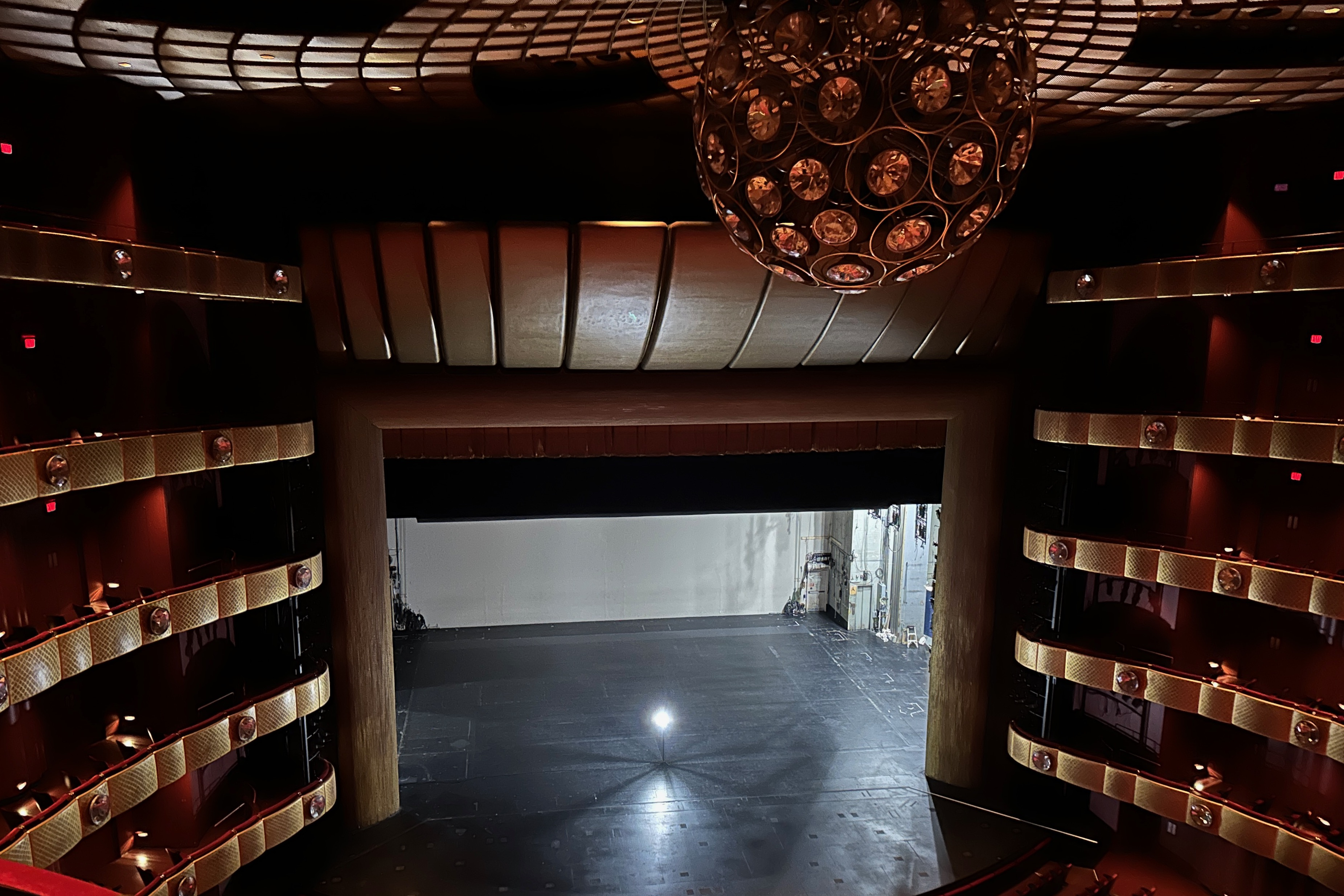
Ghost light on the stage of the David H. Koch Theater

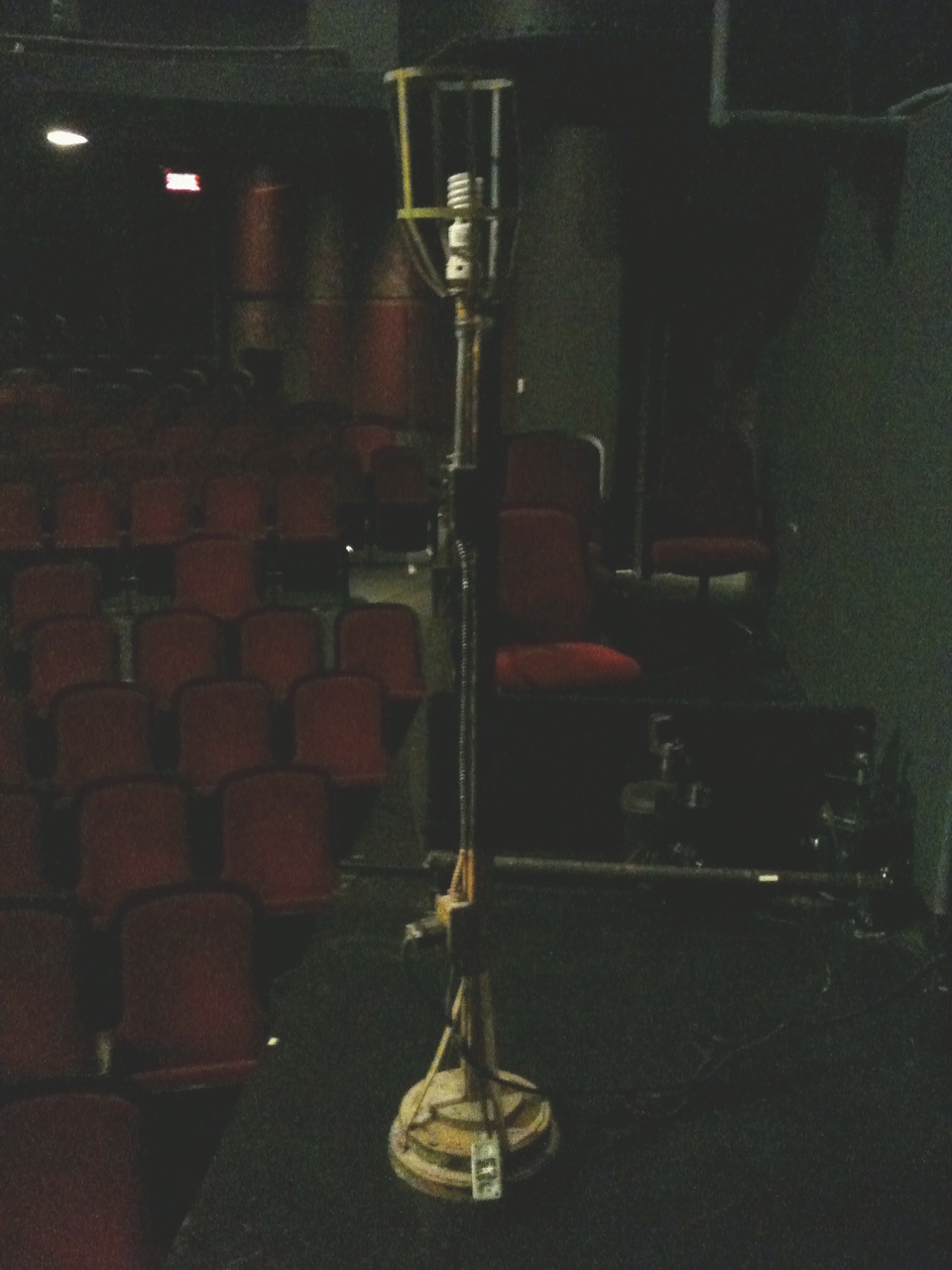
A ghost light.

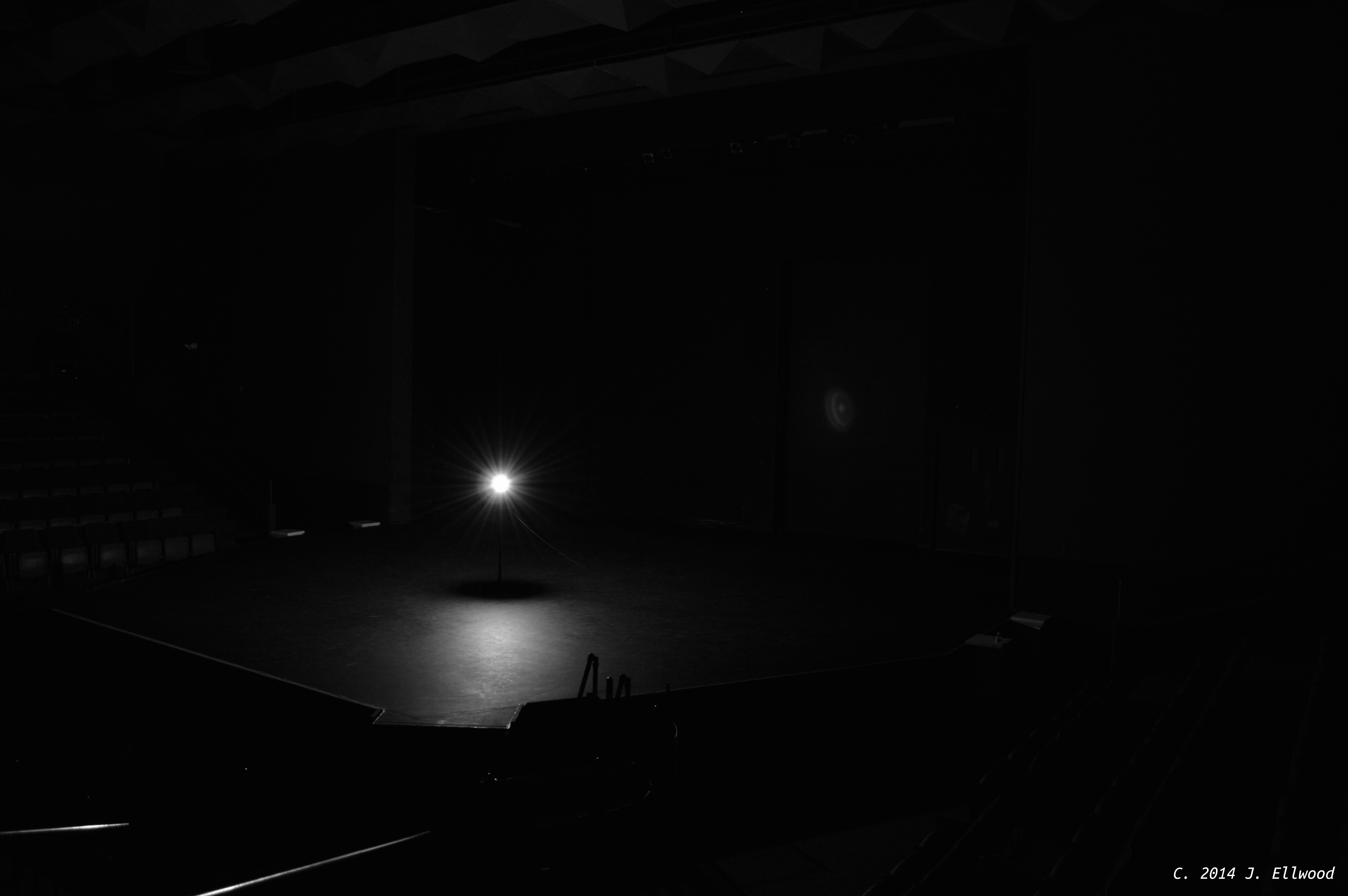
A ghost light illuminating an empty stage in a darkened theatre.

A ghost light is an electric light that is left energised on the stage of a theatre when the theatre is unoccupied and would otherwise be completely dark. Typically, it consists of an exposed light bulb mounted in a wire cage on a portable light stand. It is usually placed near centre stage. Ghost lights are also sometimes known as equity lights or equity lamps, possibly indicating their use was originally mandated by the Actors' Equity Association, or Equity.

== Origin and superstitions ==
The practical use of a ghost light is for safety. A ghost light enables one to navigate the theatre to find the lighting control console and to avoid accidents such as falling into the orchestra pit and stepping on or tripping over set pieces. There is an unsubstantiated story of a burglar who tripped on a dark stage, broke his leg and sued the theatre for damages.

Some claim that the tradition began in the days of gas-lit theatres when dim gas lights were left burning to relieve pressure on the gas valves.

Aside from its obvious practical purpose, there are a number of superstitions associated with the origin and purpose of ghost lights.

The superstitious have various justifications for the ghost light in relation to the supernatural. A popular theatrical superstition holds that every theatre has a ghost, and some theatres have traditions to appease ghosts that reach far back into their history. For example, the Palace Theatre, London keeps two seats in its balcony permanently bolted open to provide seating for the theatre ghosts. Similar superstitions hold that ghost lights provide opportunities for ghosts to perform onstage, thus appeasing them and preventing them from cursing the theatre or sabotaging the set or production. This is also used to explain the traditional one day a week that theatres are closed. Some superstitions claim that the ghost light is in place to scare away ghosts, not to appease them.

== During COVID-19 ==
Many theatres that were forced to close during the COVID-19 pandemic renewed the tradition of ghost lights as a way of indicating the theatres would re-open. The Sydney Opera House left ghost lights on the stages of the Joan Sutherland Theatre, the Drama Theatre, the Playhouse and the Studio. Other theatres then followed suit, including Sydney Theatre Company's Roslyn Packer Theatre in Walsh Bay, the Seymour Centre in Chippendale, and the Merrigong Theatre at the Illawarra Performing Arts Centre in Wollongong. Ghost lights were kept burning in theatres in Florida including Artis—Naples and Barbara B. Mann Performing Arts Hall, Florida Repertory Theatre, Sugden Theater and at the Broadway Palm, Cultural Park Theater. The Royal Alexandra Theatre in Toronto, Canada burned a ghost light through both the 1918 and 2020 pandemics. There is also a claim that during the 2020 pandemic closures "every stage on Broadway has a lamp".

During the pandemic, the closure of theatres worldwide prompted digital and virtual performances inspired by the ghost light concept. The West Australian Opera live-streamed solo aria performances and called the series the Ghostlight Opera. The National Institute of Dramatic Art (NIDA) in Australia held a digital theatre festival which included a show called Ghost Lights where famous theatre characters perform on the empty stages of the world.

On 22 May 2020, while the theatre was closed for the COVID-19 pandemic, the Finnish National Theater presented an installation called “Ghost Light" "in which observations of interconnectedness of species are shared through the undulating light on an empty theatre stage".
