= Catwalk (disambiguation) =

A catwalk is the runway at a fashion show on which models walk.

Catwalk or The Catwalk may also refer to:

== Walkways ==
- A catwalk in this sense is generally a raised walkway that could be located above ceiling in an attic with a weak floor
- Catwalk (theater), a strip walked on for behind-the-scenes technical functions
- Footbridge § Catwalk, a walkway on a bridge which is used for maintenance access
- Skyway, enclosed or open pedestrian bridge over a street, rail line, or body of water

== Film and television ==
=== Film ===
- The Catwalk (film), a 1927 German film
- Catwalk (film), a 1995 American film starring Christy Turlington

=== Television ===
- Catwalk (Australian TV series), a 1972 Australian TV series
- Catwalk (Canadian TV series), a 1992–1994 Canadian TV series
- "Catwalk" (The Adventures of Batman & Robin), a 1995 episode of the American TV animated series
- "Catwalk" (RuPaul's Drag Race), a 2022 episode
- "The Catwalk", a 2002 second-season episode of Star Trek: Enterprise

== Music ==
- "The Cat Walk", a 1958 song by The Kingsmen, a short-lived band of Franny Beecher and other moonlighting Comets from Bill Haley and the Comets
- The Cat Walk, a 1962 album by Donald Byrd
- Catwalk, a 1977 album by Chico Hamilton
- "Cat Walk", a 1983 song by Saga from the album Heads or Tales
- Catwalk (Emily Remler album), 1985
- "Catwalk", a 1995 song by Tangerine Dream from Tyranny of Beauty
- "Catwalk" (Soul'd Out song), 2006
- "Cat Walk", a 2014 song by Jeffree Star

== Other uses ==
- Catwalk!, a series of collages by Christiaan Tonnis
