= San Angelo Performing Arts Coalition =

San Angelo PAC
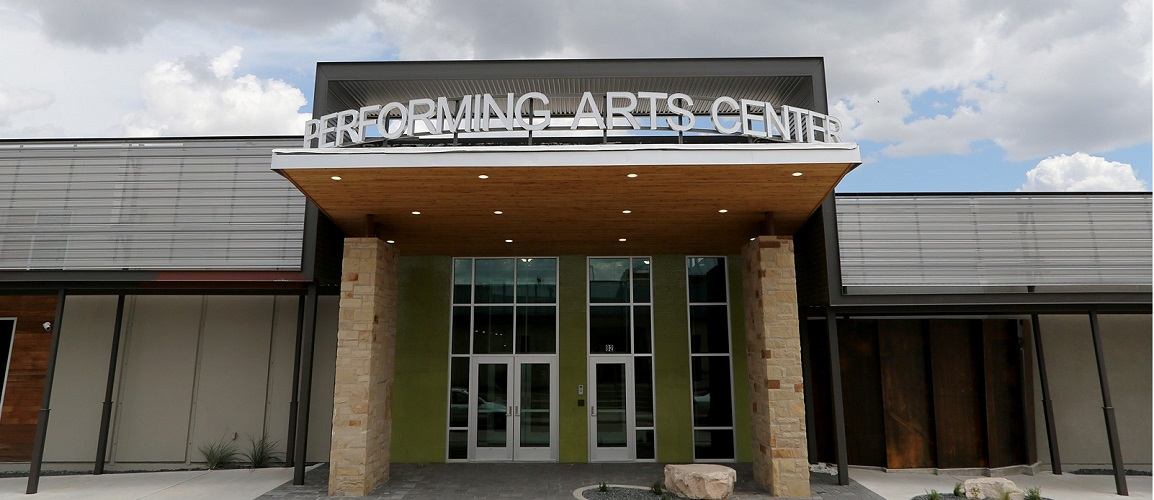
- Interactive map of San Angelo PAC
- Address: 82 Gillis Street; San Angelo, Texas; United States
- Coordinates: 31.46599°N 100.43923°W
- Capacity: Murphey Performance Hall: 1,370; Brooks & Bates Theater:301; San Angelo Health Foundation Black Box:120
- Production: Texas Premiere of Amazing Grace

Construction
- Opened: 2016

The San Angelo PAC, doing business as the San Angelo Performing Arts Center, is a theatrical campus in San Angelo, Texas, including the Stephens Performing Arts Center and Murphey Performance Hall, which opened to the public after renovation in 2016 with Mark Levine as the founding Executive Director. The complex is located downtown just behind city hall.

- The Stephens Performing Arts Center (dedicated on September 8, 2016) is located in the former Coca-Cola warehouse with a new 301-seat theater space, a black box performance space, 6 ballet studios, a Pilates studio, and scene shops. The building also houses Ballet San Angelo and the San Angelo Chorus. From 2017 to 2024, Be Theatre was a resident, non-profit theatre company that occupied a portion of the Stephens PAC and produce an annual season of shows.

- The Elta Joyce Murphey Performance Hall (rededicated on October 3, 2017) is located within City Hall, and was originally constructed in 1928. The San Angelo Symphony, Ballet San Angelo, and the San Angelo Broadway Academy are regular users of the Performance Hall.

The first full performance season (2017/18) encompassing both performance spaces was announced on June 15, 2017.

== Executive Directors ==
2021 to present: Yukio Kuniyuki

2021 (interim): Elena Kent

2020-2021: Larry Hettick (Board Member who performed duties during COVID)

2019-2020: Berkeley Puckitt

2016-2019: Mark Levine

== Performance and other venues ==
=== Murphey Performance Hall ===
This 1356-seat theater is the largest facility on the campus of San Angelo PAC and has been renovated to accommodate both acoustic and amplified performances. Seating is on two levels — orchestra and balcony.

=== Brooks & Bates Theatre ===
The Brooks & Bates Theatre seats 300 on one level. The proscenium theater with full backstage features can accommodate nearly any artistic production on a smaller scale.

=== Black Box Performance Space ===
Built as a "black box theater," customizable for any event. The Black Box Performance Space was the home of the resident theatre company, Be Theatre until 2024. Since then it has become a venue for local comedy and music shows
