= Parts of a theatre =

Components of a performance venue

There are different types of theatres, but they all have three major parts in common. Theatres are divided into two main sections, the house and the stage; there is also a backstage area in many theatres. The house is the seating area for guests watching a performance and the stage is where the actual performance is given. The backstage area is usually restricted to people who are producing or in the performance.

== Types of theatres ==
- Arena: A large open door with seating capacity for very large groups. Seating layouts are typically similar to the theatre in the round, or proscenium (though the stage will not have a proscenium arch. In almost all cases the playing space is made of temporary staging (risers) and is elevated a few feet higher than the first rows of audience.
- Black box theatre: An unadorned space with no defined playing area. Often the seating is not fixed allowing the room to be re-configured for the demands of a specific production. Typically the seating and performance space are on the same level.
- Proscenium: The audience directly faces the playing area which is separated by a portal called the proscenium arch.
- Theatre in the round: The playing area is surrounded by audience seating on all sides.
- Thrust: The playing area protrudes out into the house with the audience seating on 3 sides.
- Traverse: The elongated playing area is surrounded by audience seating on two sides. Similar in design to a fashion show runway.

== Stage ==
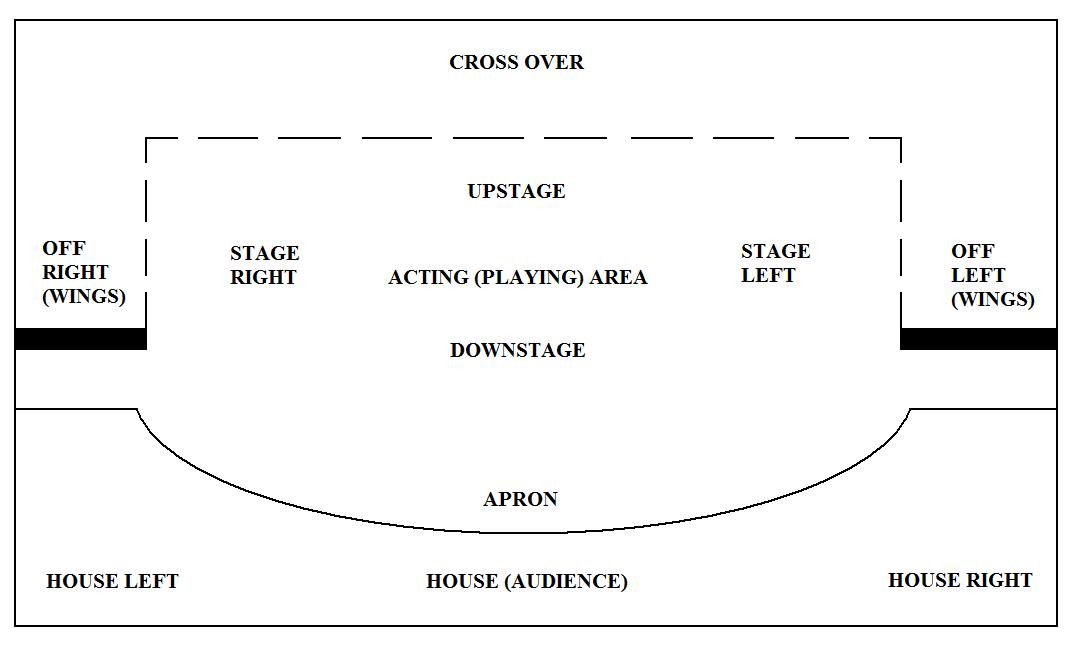
Areas of a typical (proscenium) stage.

The area of the theatre in which the performance takes place is referred to as the stage.

=== Stage directions or stage positions ===
In order to keep track of how performers and set pieces move around the space, the stage is divided up into sections oriented based on the performers' perspective to the audience. Movement is choreographed by blocking which is organized movement on stage created by the director to synchronize the actor's movement onstage in order to use these positions.

Upstage
The area of the stage furthest from the audience.
Downstage
The area of the stage closest to the audience.
Stage left
The area of the stage to the performer's left, when facing downstage (i.e. towards the audience).
Stage right
The area of the stage to the performer's right, when facing downstage (i.e. towards the audience).
Center stage
The center of the playing (performance) area.
Center line
An imaginary reference line on the playing area that indicates the exact center of the stage, travelling from up to downstage.
Onstage
The portion of the playing area visible to the audience.
Offstage
The area surrounding the playing space not visible to the audience. Typically this refers to spaces accessible to the performers but not the audience, such as the wings, crossovers, and voms.

For performance spaces with audiences in more than one orientation, typically one direction is arbitrarily denoted as "downstage" and all other directions reference that point.

=== Stage components ===
Apron
The area of the stage in front of the proscenium arch, which may be small or, in a thrust stage, large.
Backstage
Areas of the theatre adjacent to the stage accessible only to performers and technicians, including the wings, crossover, and dressing rooms. Typically this refers to areas directly accessible from the stage and does not include spaces such as the control booth or orchestra pit
Crossover
The area used by performers and technicians to travel between sides of the stage out of sight of the audience; sometimes created onstage with flats, or masking and drapery.
Plaster line
An imaginary reference line on the playing area that indicates where the proscenium arch is. Typically, the plaster line runs across the stage at the back face (upstage face) of the proscenium wall.
Portal or proscenium arch
An open frame on a proscenium stage that divides the audience from the stage in traditional Western theatres.
Prompt corner
Area just to one side of the proscenium where the stage manager stands to cue the show and prompt performers.
Rake
A slope in the performance space (stage), rising away from the audience.
Safety curtain
A heavy fireproof curtain, in fiberglass, iron or similar material placed immediately behind the proscenium.
Shell
A hard, often removable surface, designed to reflect sound out into the audience for musical performances.
Smoke pocket
Vertical channels against the proscenium designed to contain the safety curtain.
Thrust stage
A performance space projecting well in front of the proscenium arch, usually with the audience on three sides.
Wings
Areas that are part of a stage deck but offstage (out of sight of the audience). The wings are typically masked with legs. The wing space is used for performers preparing to enter, storage of sets for scenery changes and as a stagehand work area. Wings also contain technical equipment, such as the fly system.

In the dressing room there is a makeup bench, chairs and mirrors.

== House ==
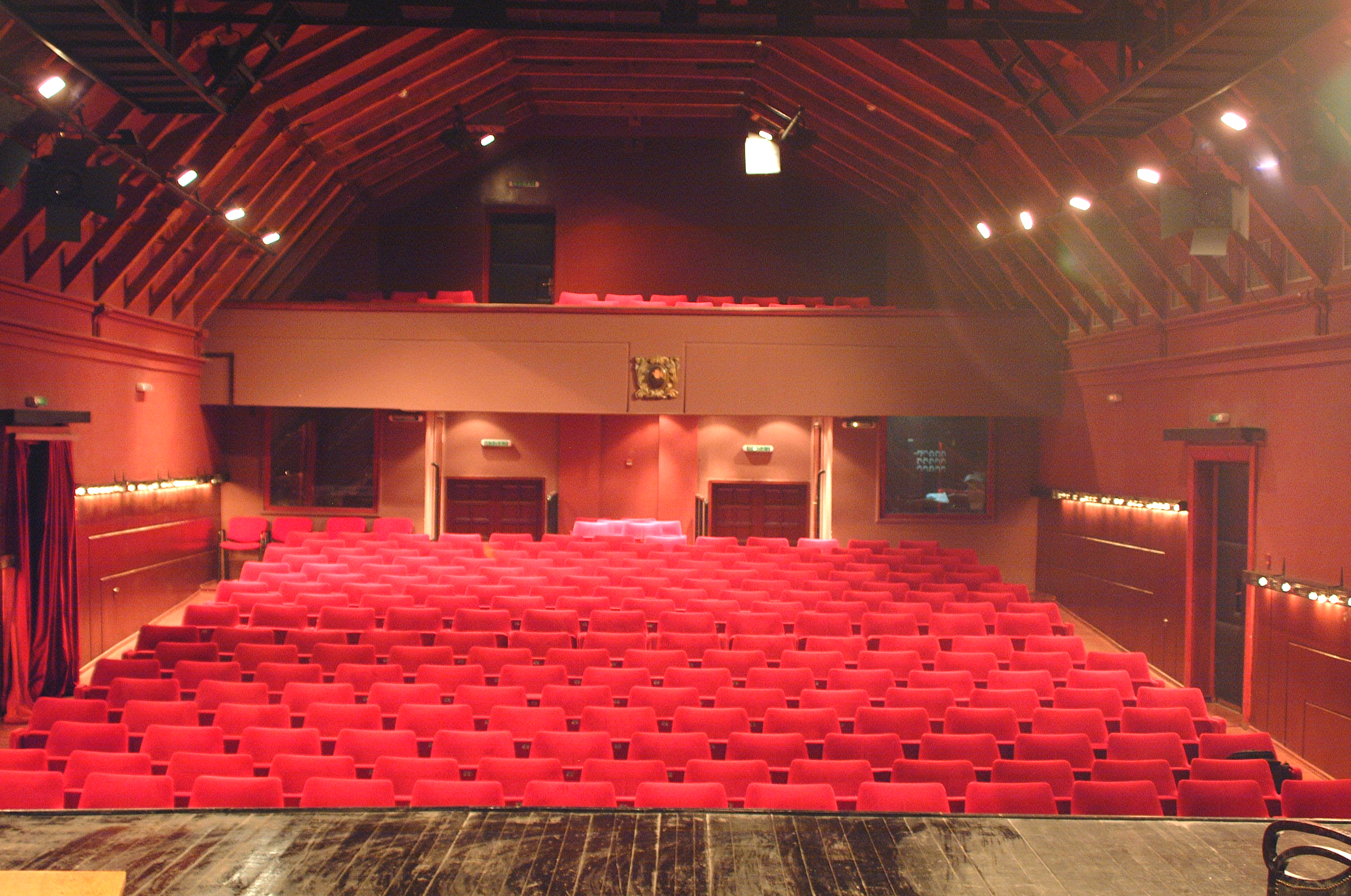
A view from the stage of Knjaževsko-srpski teatar showing the control booths, a balcony, and some catwalks.

The house can refer to any area which is not considered playing space or backstage area. Outside the theatre itself this includes the lobby, coat check, ticketing counters, and restrooms. More specifically, the house refers to any area in the theatre where the audience is seated. This can also include aisles, the orchestra pit, control booth, balconies and boxes.

- Orchestra or Orchestra Pit: In productions where live music is required, such as ballet, folk-dance groups, opera, and musicals, the orchestra is positioned in front and below of the stage in a pit. The pit is usually a large opening ranging from 4–6 feet (1.2–1.8 m) wide, 20–40 feet (6.1–12.2 m) long and 6–10 feet (1.8–3.0 m) deep. Some orchestra pits have lifts or elevators that can raise the floor of the pit up to the same height as the stage. This allows for easier movement of instruments among other things. Often an orchestra pit will be equipped with a removable pit cover which provides safety by eliminating the steep drop off and also increases the available acting area above. In most cases, some sort of lattice or sound port is built into the front of the orchestra pit, to allow audience members in the front rows to hear the music while still having a wall to keep them separated from the orchestra. The orchestra pit is the closest to the audience.
- Auditorium: The section of the theatre designated for the viewing of a performance. Includes the patrons main seating area, balconies, boxes, and entrances from the lobby. Typically the control booth is located in the back of the auditorium, although for some types of performance an audio mixing positing in located closer to the stage within the seating.
- Vomitorium: A passage situated below or behind a tier of seats.
- Control booth: The section of the theatre designated for the operation of technical equipment, followspots, lighting and sound boards, and is sometimes the location of the stage manager's station. The control booth is located in the theatre in such a way that there is a good, unobstructed view of the playing area without causing any (or minimal) distraction to the audience (i.e. preventing distracting light leak or noise), and is generally an enclosed space.
- Catwalks: A catwalk is a section of the house hidden in the ceiling from which many of the technical functions of a theatre, such as lighting and sound, may be manipulated.

=== Front of house ===
- Lobby: The lobby is a room in a theatre which is used for public entry to the building from the outside. Ticket counters, coat check, concessions and restrooms are all usually located in, or just off the lobby.
- Box office: A place where tickets are sold to the public for admission to a venue
- Marquee: Signage stating either the name of the establishment or the play and the artist(s) appearing at that venue.

== Backstage or offstage ==
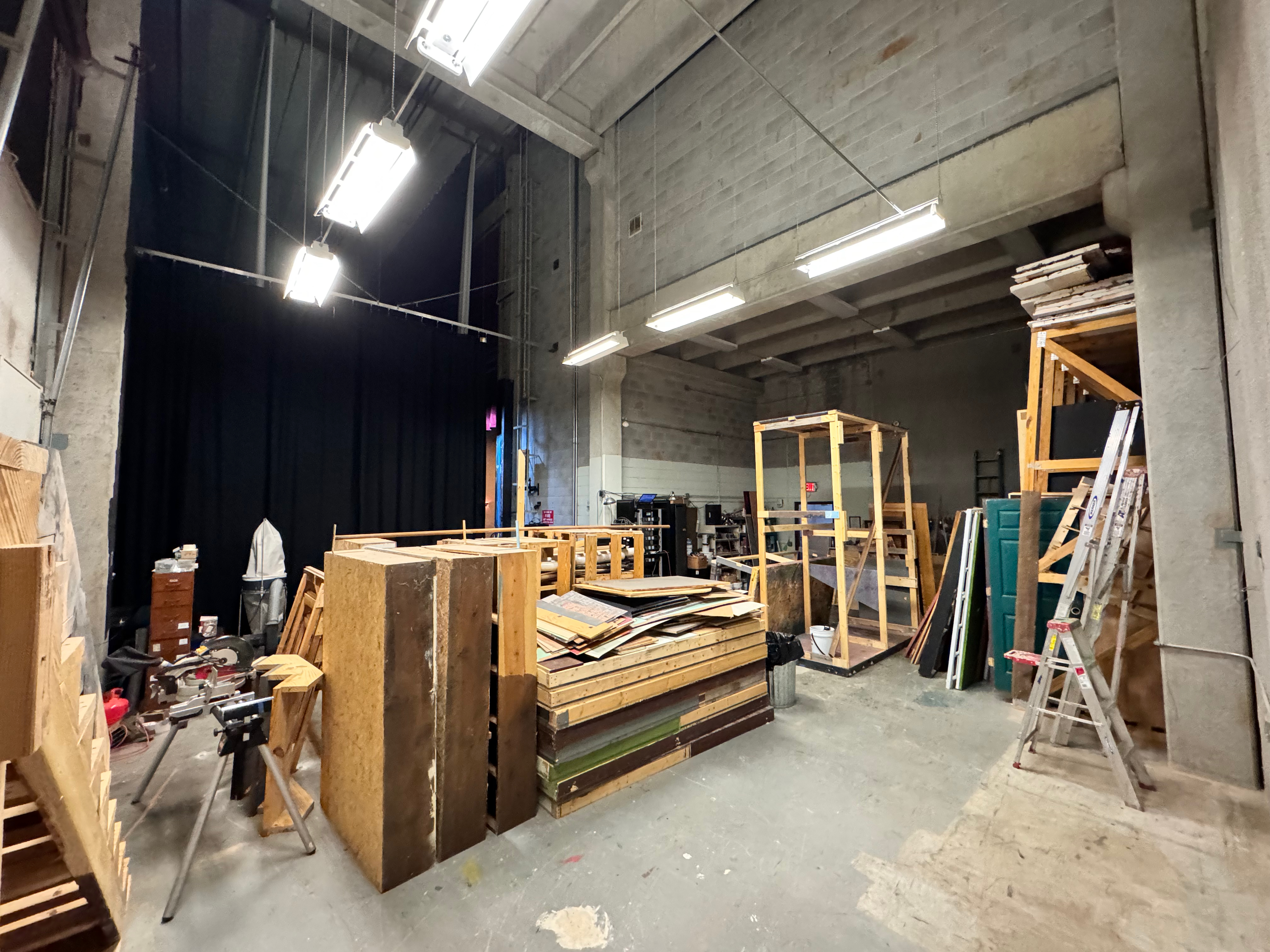
The backstage of the Peacock Performing Arts Center in Hayesville, North Carolina

The areas of a theatre that are not part of the house or stage are considered part of backstage. These areas include dressing rooms, green rooms, offstage areas (i.e. wings), cross-overs, fly rails or linesets, dimmer rooms, shops and storage areas.

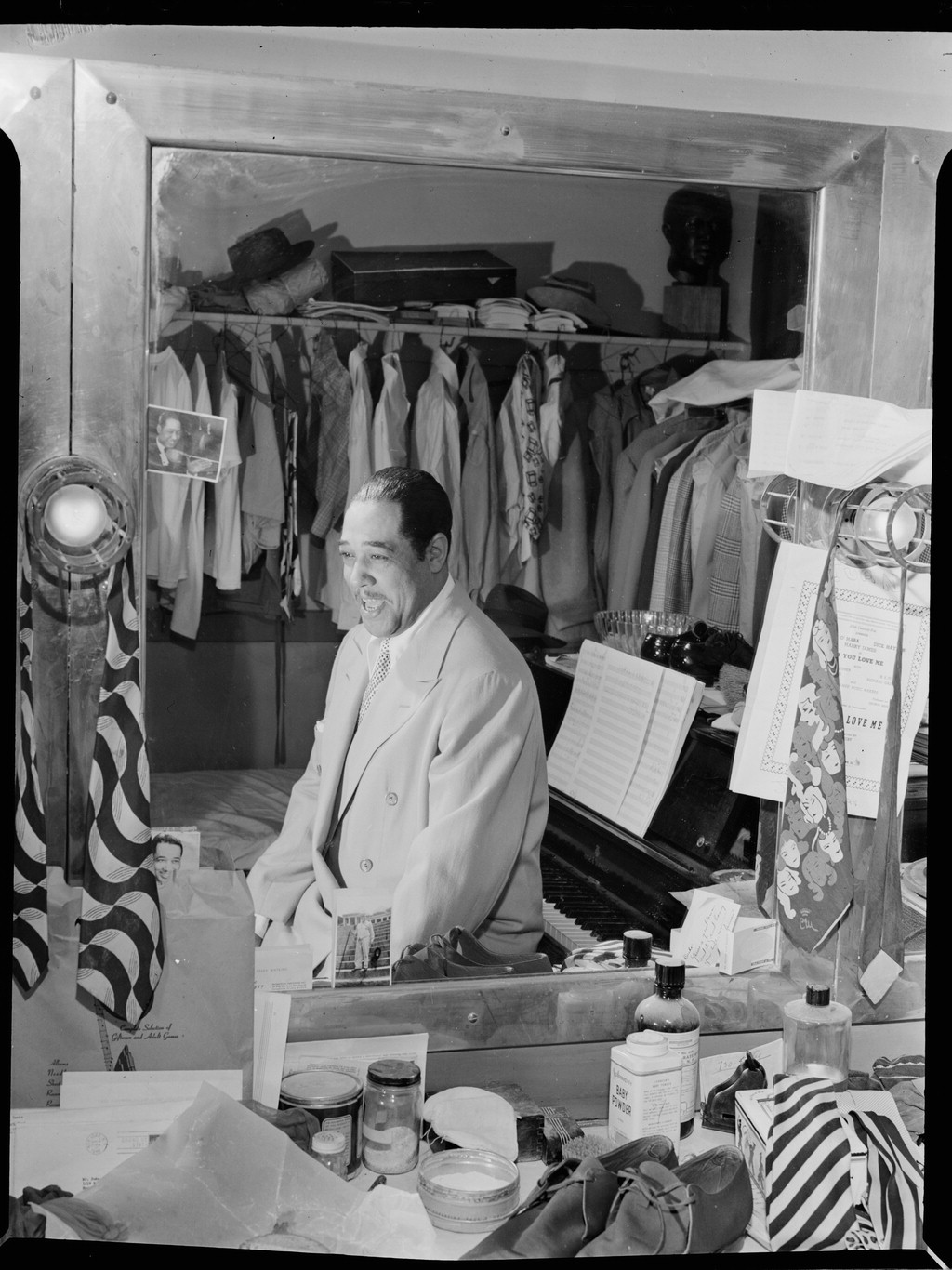
- Duke Ellington in the mirror of a dressing room at Paramount Theatre Manhattan (1946)
  Dressing rooms: Rooms where cast members apply wigs, make-up and change into costumes. Depending on the size of the theatre, there may be only a male and female dressing room, or there might be many (i.e. one for each member of the cast). Often in larger spaces, cast members in lead roles have their own dressing room, those in supporting roles share with one or two others and those in the background or "chorus" roles share with up to 10 or 15 other people. Dressing rooms generally feature a large number of switchable outlets for accessories like hair dryers, straightening irons, and curlers. They also feature mirrors, which are often lit. Sinks are present for the removal of makeup and sometimes a dressing room will have showers and restrooms attached. Lockers, or costume racks are generally used for storage of costumes. In some performances, dressing rooms are used as a secondary green room because of space limitation or noise, especially by performers with long breaks between stage appearances.
- Green room: The lounge backstage. This is the room where actors and other performers wait in when they are not needed onstage or in their dressing rooms.
- Crossover: A crossover is a hallway, room, or catwalk designed to allow actors in a theater to move from wings on one side of a stage to wings on the other side without being seen by the audience. Sometimes this is built as a part of the theater, sometimes exiting the building is required, and still other times the set includes a false wall to create a temporary crossover. A trap room, orchestra pit, or even the front of house can be used as crossovers.
- Fly system: A fly system is a system of ropes, counterweights, pulleys, and other such tools designed to allow a technical crew to quickly move set pieces, lights, and microphones on and off stage quickly by "flying" them in from a large opening above the stage known as a fly tower/flyspace.
- Catwalk: A catwalk is an elevated platform from which many of the technical functions of a theatre, such as lighting and sound, may be manipulated.
- Dimmer room: The room backstage which contains the dimmer racks which power the lighting rig in the theatre. Often dimmer racks may not be housed in dedicated room, instead they may be in a mechanical room, control booth, or catwalk, or even on the side of the stage as is often the case on Broadway, touring shows, or at corporate events. When the dimmers are stored onstage, this area of the stage is known as the "Dimmer Beach". In the UK it is known as "Dimmer City".
- Shops and storage areas: Depending on the space available a theatre may have its own storage areas for old scenic and costume elements as well as lighting and sound equipment. The theatre may also include its own lighting, scenic, costume and sound shops. In these shops each element of the show is constructed and prepared for each production.
- Call board: Literally a backstage bulletin board which contains information about a theatrical production including contact sheets, schedules, rehearsal time changes, etc.
- Trap room: A large open space under the stage of many large theatres. The trap room allows the stage floor to be leveled, extra electrical equipment to be attached, and most importantly, the placement of trap doors onto the stage (hence the name). It is usually unfinished and often doubles as a storage area. It is often also used as a substitute for a crossover.
