= Color commentator =

Sports commentator who assists the play-by-play announcer

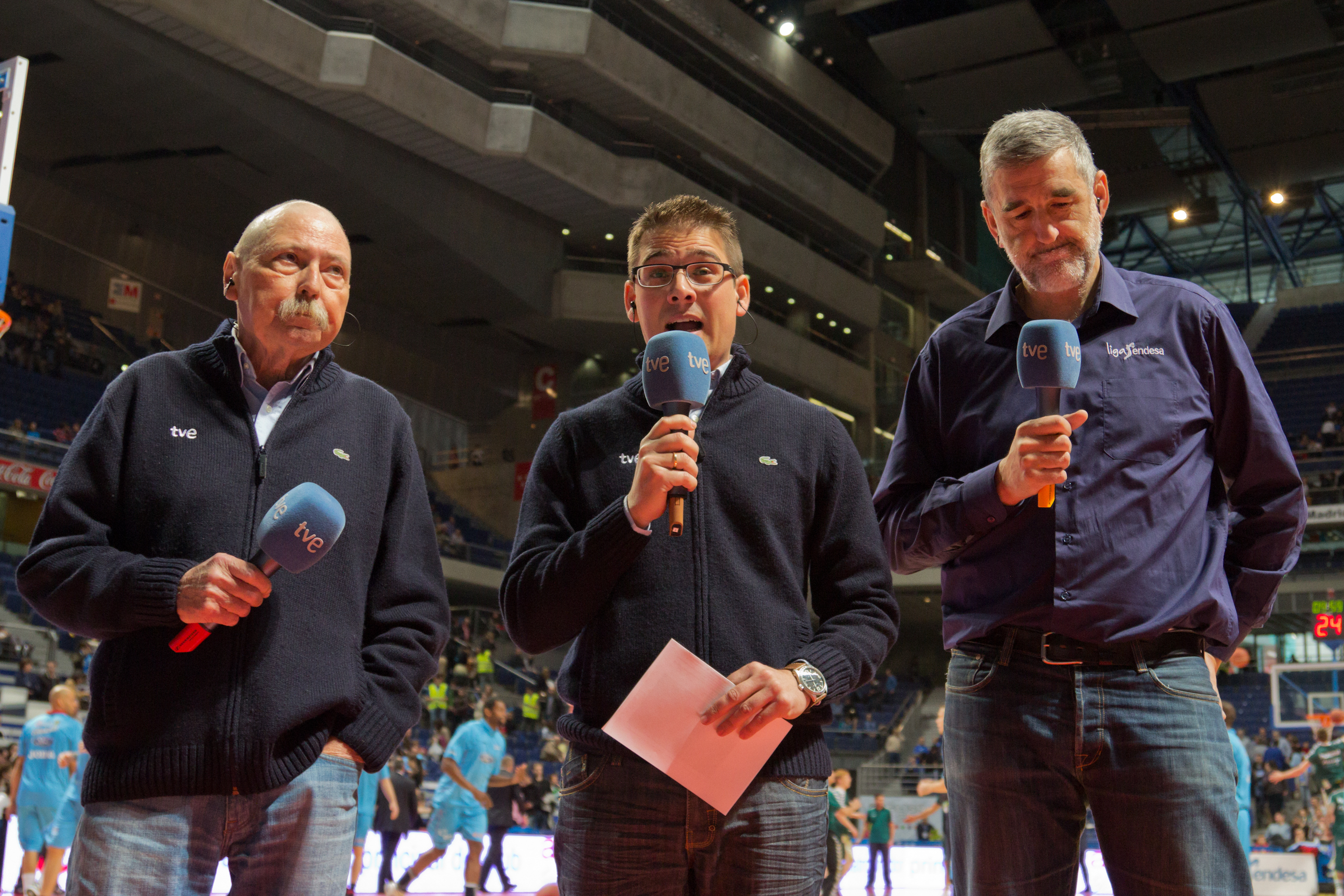
Manel Comas, Arsenio Cañada and Juanma Iturriaga during a live Liga ACB broadcast.

A color commentator or expert commentator is a sports commentator who assists the main (play-by-play) commentator, typically by filling in when play is not in progress. The person may also be referred to as a summarizer (outside North America) or analyst (a term used throughout the English-speaking world). The color analyst and main commentator will often exchange comments freely throughout the broadcast, when the main commentator is not describing the action. The color commentator provides expert analysis and background information, such as statistics, strategy, and injury reports on the teams and athletes, and occasionally anecdotes or light humor. Color commentators are often former athletes, coaches, or experts of the sport being broadcast (such as a former NFL referee as a rules analyst to add color commentary to the rules).

The term color (Note: Specifically meaning #7, "Richness of expression". Spelled "colour" when used in British English.) refers to levity and insight provided by a secondary announcer. A sports color commentator customarily works alongside the play-by-play broadcaster.

== United States and Canada ==
Commentary teams typically feature one professional commentator describing the passage of play, and another, usually a former player, coach, or expert, providing supplementary input as the sports event progresses. Color commentators usually restrict their input to times that the ball or the puck is out of play, or there is no significant action on the field or the court. They usually defer to the main commentator when a shot on goal or another significant event occurs. That sometimes results in them being talked over or cut short by the primary commentator. Former players and managers also appear as pundits and carry out a similar role to that of the co-commentator during the pre-game show before a given contest and the post-game show after it.

In American motorsports coverage, there may be as many as two color commentators in the booth for a given broadcast.

In the 2010s, some sports broadcasters began to employ rules analysts, a contributor—typically a former referee—who provides analysis and opinions regarding calls being made by referees officiating the event. The practice was first popularized in the NFL, with Fox hiring former officials Mike Pereira and Dean Blandino. The practice has since been extended to other sports, with officials such as Steve Javie (basketball), Dave Jackson (hockey), and Joe Machnik (soccer) having taken on similar roles for ESPN/ABC and Fox respectively. CBS similarly hired Gene Steratore in 2018, serving as a rules analyst for both NFL and college basketball coverage.

== United Kingdom ==
The term "color commentator" is largely unknown outside American sports. In the United Kingdom, the equivalent role is usually called "summarizer" but other terms used are "analyst", "pundit" or simply "co-commentator". Cricket coverage on Cricinfo uses similar terminology.

== Australia and New Zealand ==
The term is not used in Australia or New Zealand. Those giving the analysis alongside the main commentator are sometimes said to be giving additional or expert analysis, or "special comments", or they may be referred to as "expert commentators".

== Latin America ==
For Association football broadcasts on Latin American sports television channels, such a commentator is called a comentarista in both Spanish and Portuguese and contrasts with the narrador, locutor (Spanish and Portuguese) or relator (Spanish - Argentina and Uruguay) who leads the transmission. The term "color" is not used or translated.
