= Catwalk (theater) =

Elevated service platform

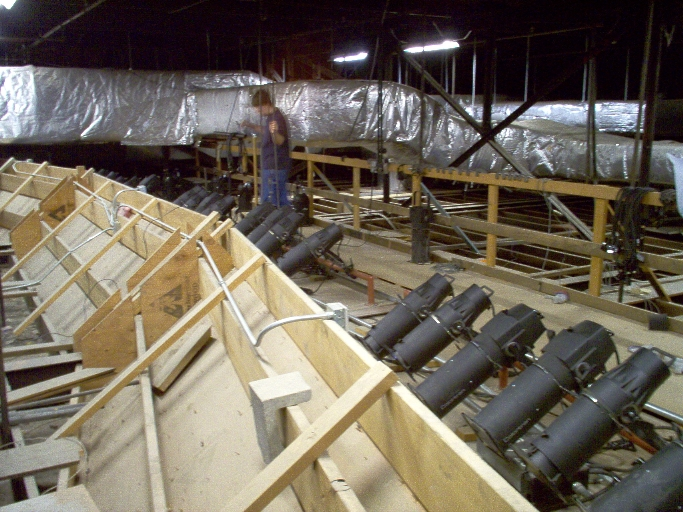
One example of a catwalk with a number of lighting instruments

In theater, catwalk is an elevated service platform close to the ceiling from which lighting and other technical equipment may be manipulated.

== Function ==
Catwalks are used to suspend lighting instruments and microphones directed at the stage. The catwalks provide easy access for theater personnel to perform common tasks. For example, lights may need to be accessed for maintenance, position adjustment, or addition and removal of gels and gobos.

== Placement ==
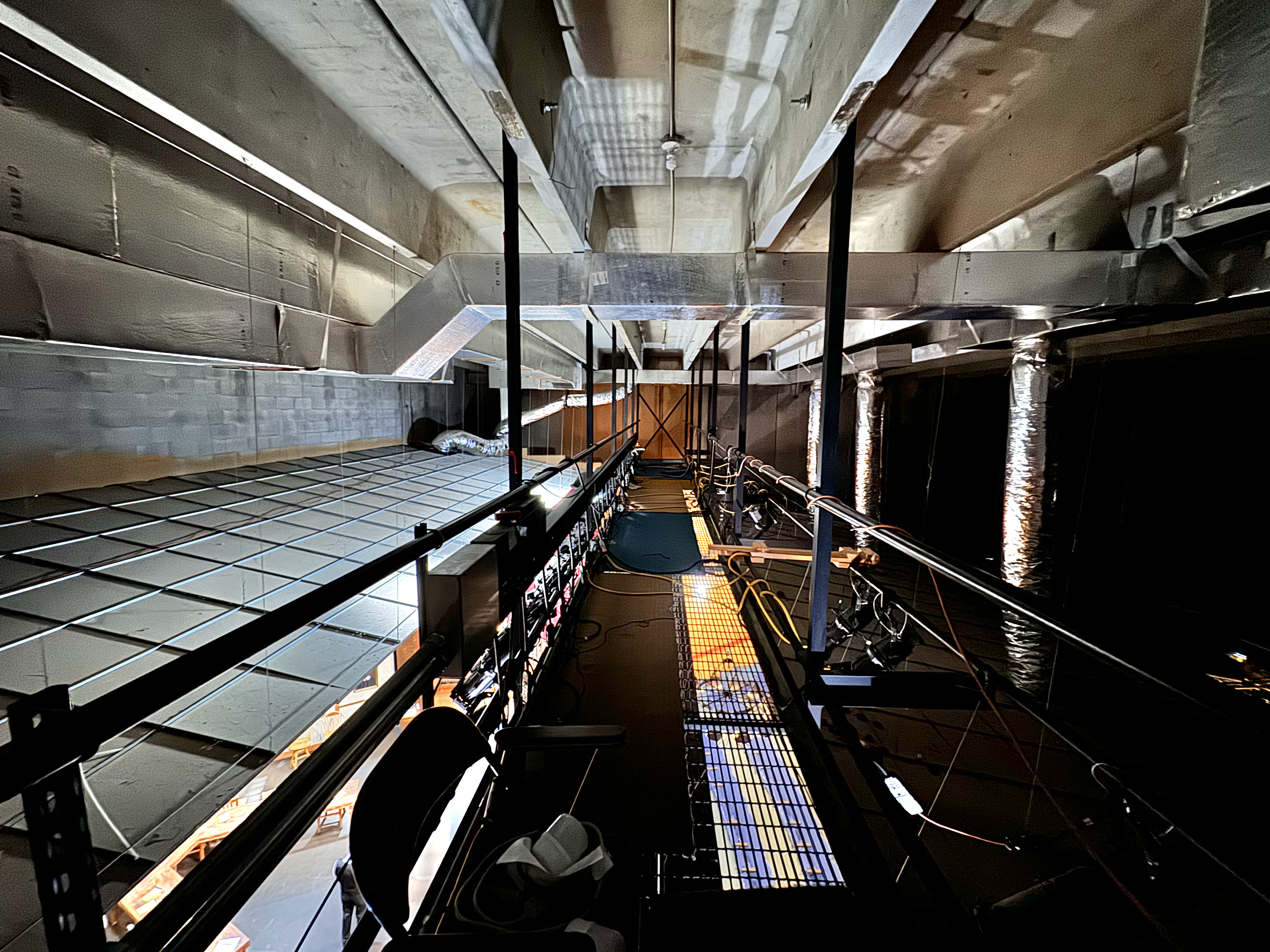
A catwalk above the auditorium of a community theatre

Typically, catwalks are located in positions hidden from audience view or directly above an audience, and are considered "behind-the-scenes". For example, many proscenium theaters have a series of two or more catwalks running parallel to the proscenium arch above a false ceiling. Stairs or a ladder up to the catwalks is usually located somewhere backstage. In modern theatres, many architects design catwalks into the "look" of the theatre. In black box theatres, catwalks and pipe grids may be the only architectural feature.

A catwalk may also be placed upstage of the proscenium as part of the fly system. These may be fixed, or they may be able to be raised and lowered.

In older decorated theaters, the catwalks are not designed to be seen by the audience. Sometimes, because of this, they are placed in the attic area above the auditorium’s ceiling, where slots and movable panels provide openings into the auditorium from the ceiling.

== Construction ==
=== Structural ===
A Hub Electric designed catwalk

Most catwalks have several battens (pipes) that lighting fixtures may be attached to. Lights are usually attached by a C-Clamp or a hook clamp around the pipes. In addition to this primary attachment, fixtures generally have an additional safety cable attaching them to the catwalk, so that if the clamp or bolt gives way, the safety cable will catch the light. This is used because the lights are generally very expensive and heavy, but mainly to protect the audience members and performers from the possibility of fixtures falling down from the catwalks. Catwalks often include a platform for a spotlight operator to work from.

=== Electrical ===
A typical catwalk has a built in electrical conduit to carry power for the lighting fixtures from the dimmers. They often hold other electrical wiring, for example standard sockets for tools, coaxial cable for projection and video monitors, built-in safety lighting to protect technicians, audio cables, and special cables for headset communications with other technicians.

== Safety ==
Since a catwalk is usually placed high above the floor, spaces where lighting instruments can go are usually chained or otherwise blocked off when a light is not present to prevent people and/or objects from falling through. The instruments themselves are attached by a safety chain to prevent them from falling. Technicians normally attach objects (such as wrenches) to themselves before going onto the catwalk, so that such objects cannot fall and possibly injure someone or damage something. This also prevents objects from falling into a place where they cannot be retrieved, such as between the catwalk floor and the ceiling, or into an HVAC vent.

Sometimes, to create better lighting positions or allow more flexibility, catwalks have minimal railings. Because of this, sometimes it is necessary for people working on them to wear fall arrest to satisfy safety requirements, as the railing cannot be considered sufficient.

== See also ==
- Tension grid
- Fly system
- Stage lighting
- Catwalk (disambiguation)
