= Naples Players =

Community theatre company in Naples, Florida

Coordinates: 26.142399°N 81.797577°W

The Naples Players
- Formation: January 19, 1953
- Type: community theatre
- Location: Naples, Florida
- Website: www.naplesplayers.org
Sugden Community Theatre
- Interactive map of Sugden Community Theatre
- Address: 701 5th Avenue South; Naples, Florida
Construction
- Opened: 1998

The Naples Players (TNP) is a community theatre company located in Naples, Florida. The company was founded on January 19, 1953 and performs in the Sugden Community Theatre at 701 5th Avenue South in downtown Naples. It has been named the "Best Live Theatre" in Southwest Florida (including professional theaters) fifteen times by the readers poll of The Naples Daily News.

== History ==
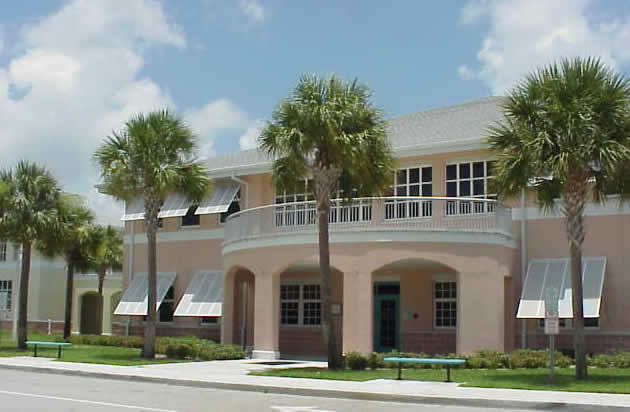
Gulfview Middle School

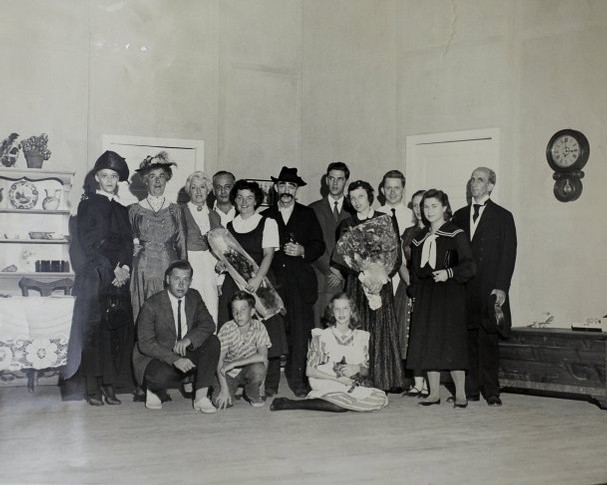
Cast of "I Remember Mama" March 20, 1953

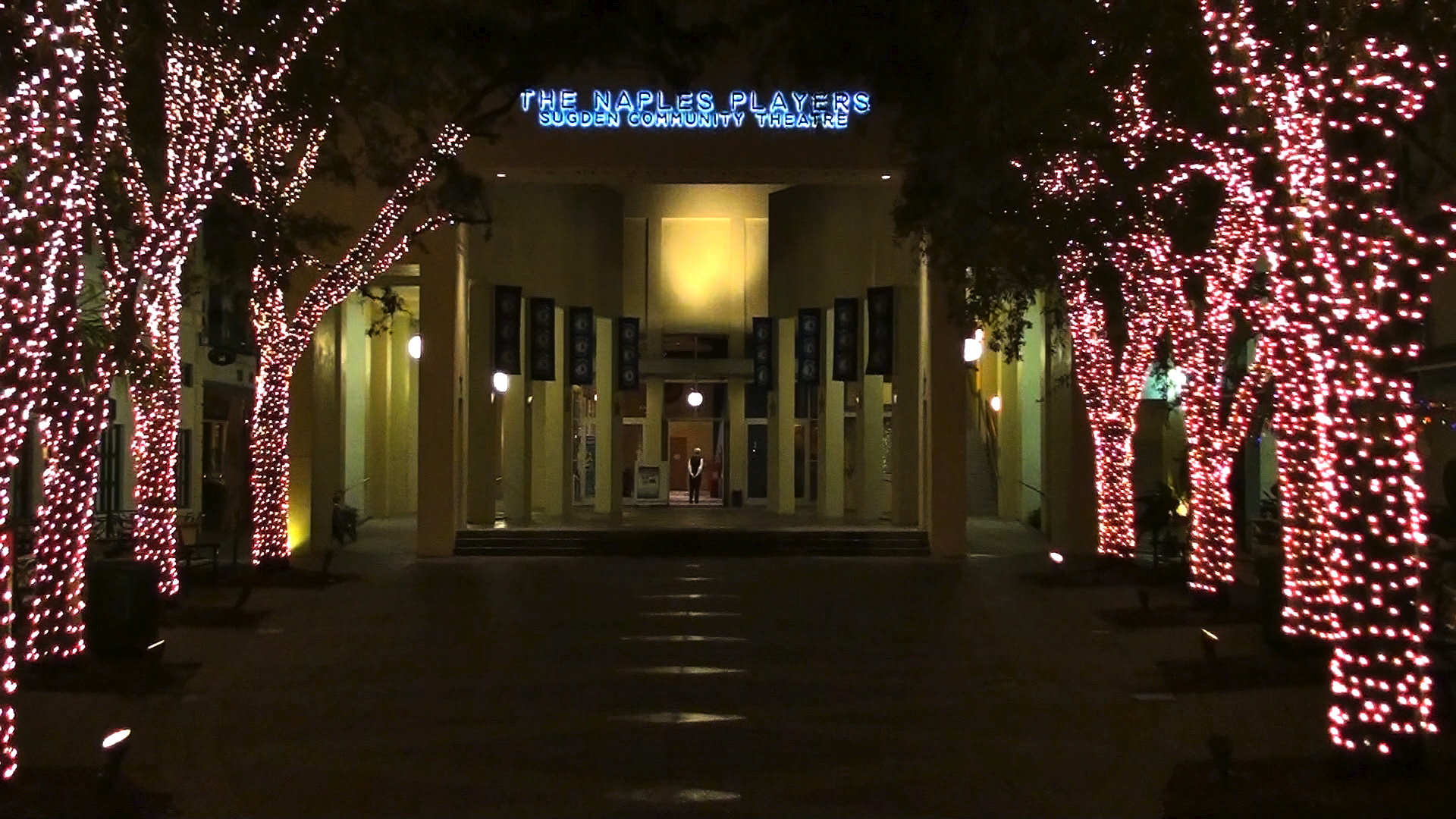
Sugden Community Theatre 1998-Present

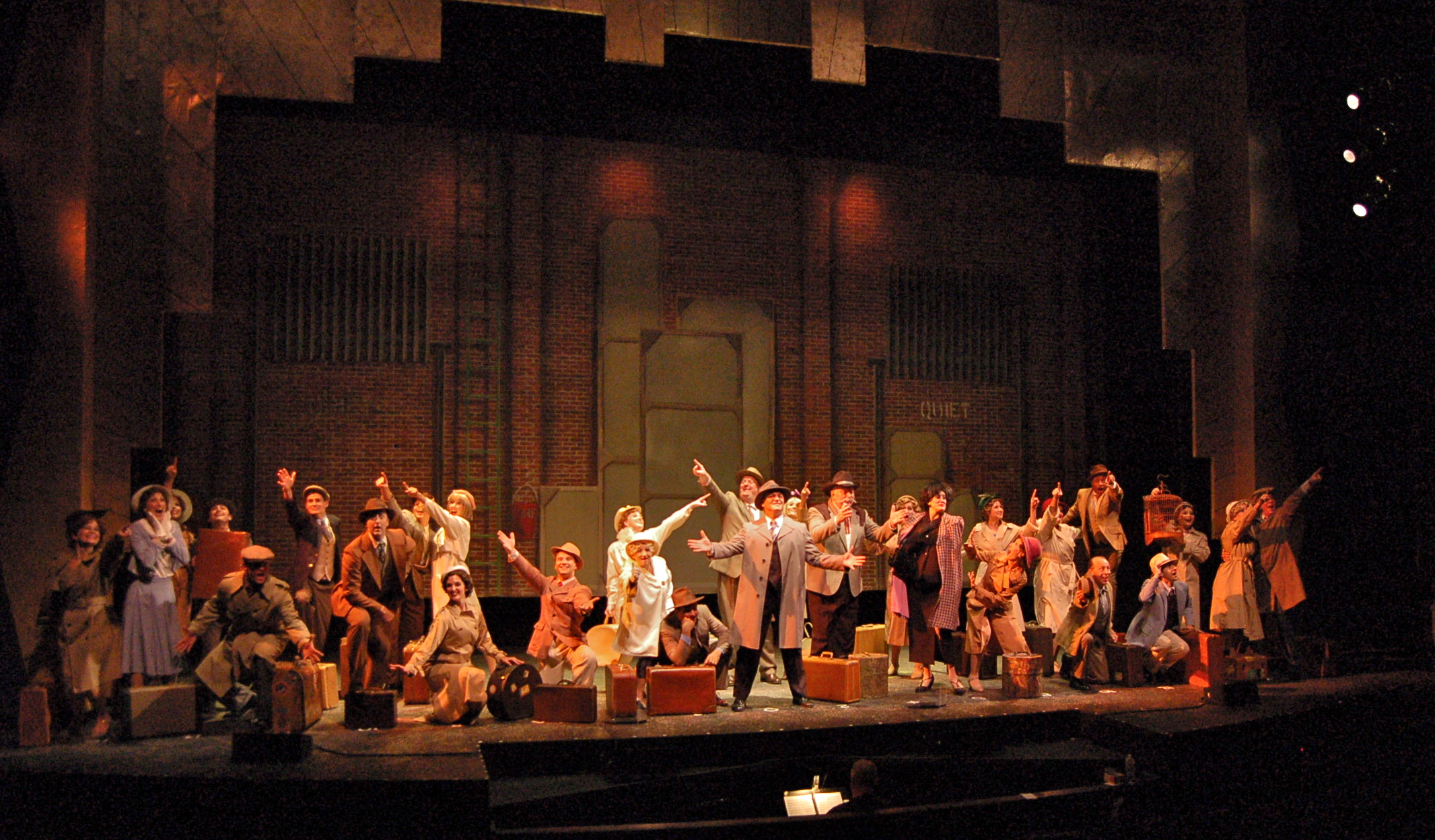
TNP Mainstage Production of 42nd Street

The Naples Players Organization was founded on January 19, 1953. Its first production, I Remember Mama by John Van Druten, was staged in the auditorium of what is now Gulfview Middle School the night of March 20, 1953. The company staged its first musical, HMS Pinafore in 1958. The group performed where it could in its first 22 years of existence in various locations in Naples, from local schools and storefronts to homes. In 1975, they established a home base for the next decade when a 40-seat playhouse was opened at 2363 Davis Boulevard. In 1985, TNP converted the now-demolished Kon-Tiki movie theatre on Goodlette-Frank Road. As many years passed, both the membership and audience for the company grew. However, as TNP entered its fourth decade of existence in the mid-1990s, the Kon-Tiki Playhouse began to suffer from a crumbling facade and mechanical breakdowns, and it soon became clear that a new location was necessary. Following an unprecedented fundraising campaign, and with a partnership with the City of Naples in choosing a suitable location, over $6 million was raised to build the Sugden Community Theatre in downtown Naples on a site provided by the City, which was completed in 1998. The Sugden Theatre sits only two blocks south of Gulfview Middle School, where TNP staged its first production in 1953; Today, the company stages productions year-round and features the talents of volunteer actors, directors, designers, and crew drawn from across Southwest Florida. Currently according to treater's official website, The theatre currently plays to an audience of over 65,000 patrons and season subscription holders annually.

== Performance schedule ==
TNP's annual performance season includes nine main stage and three studio productions of more than 260 performances per year. The Players also present six TNP Academy productions annually, as well as Readers Theatre, showcase classes, and special events such as their annual Front & Center Gala, held under the stars in front of the Theatre on Baker Plaza.

== The Naples Players Academy of Dramatic Arts ==
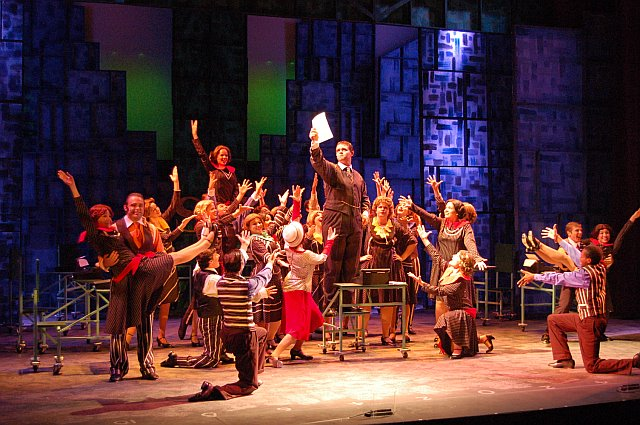
Thoroughly Modern Millie KidzAct (Teen Cast) 2009

TNP Academy (Previously KidzAct) is the youth theatre and theatre education program of The Naples Players, founded in 2002.

While TNP had traditionally produced a youth musical in the summer, an initiative was begun in the early 2000s to create a year-round educational theatre program featuring skills-building and production classes to children and young adults ranging from 4–18 years of age.

TNPA stages six productions annually. Children audition to be admitted to the production classes, which make use in applying what the students learn in the skills building sections of the classes. There is a full-time staff for the Academy and contracted artists specializing in voice, dance, improvisation, and acting instruct nearly 1600 students in house. Scholarships to the program are available based on financial need.

In the spring of 2007, TNPA began an Outreach program. The program teams with local businesses and private donors to present plays in schools which do not have any type of a theatre program. The program does not displace any existing teachers at the chosen school.

In the fall of 2025, TNPA opened a full-time academic program called The Baker Day School. The program provides academic and arts education for middle and high school students. It builds on TNPAcademy classes and camps and offers students a full-time program combining academic and artistic studies.

== Performance facilities ==
The Sugden Community Theatre building includes three main performance spaces, two sprung floor rehearsal halls, a music room and library, scenic and costume construction shops, plus ticket and administrative offices for the full-time staff. It is located at 701 5th Avenue South. From 2023-2024, the building underwent a renovation to add an additional performance space, a balcony to the mainstage, as well as updated technology and support to the rest of the facility.

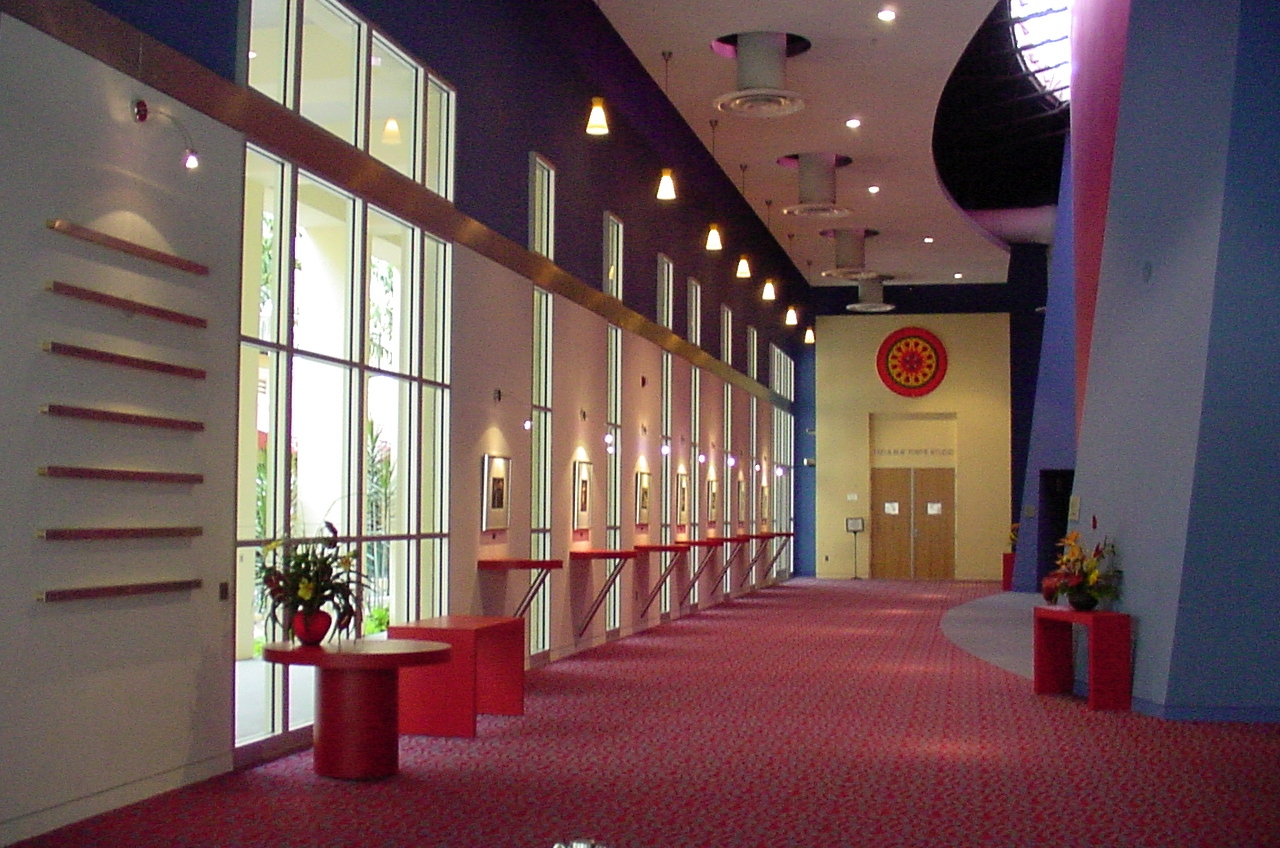
The Lobby of the Sugden Community Theatre

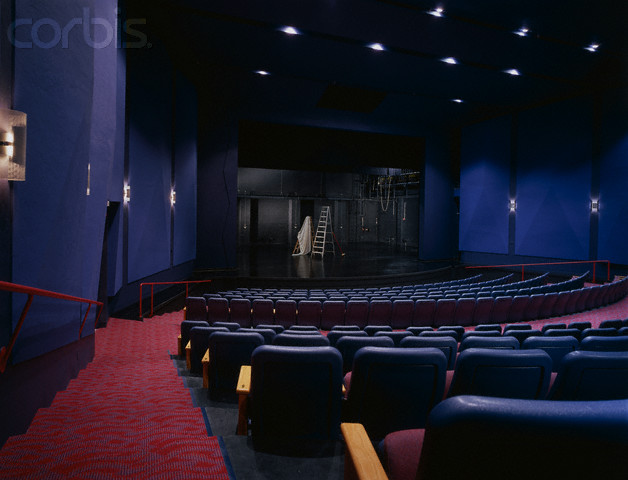
Blackburn Hall

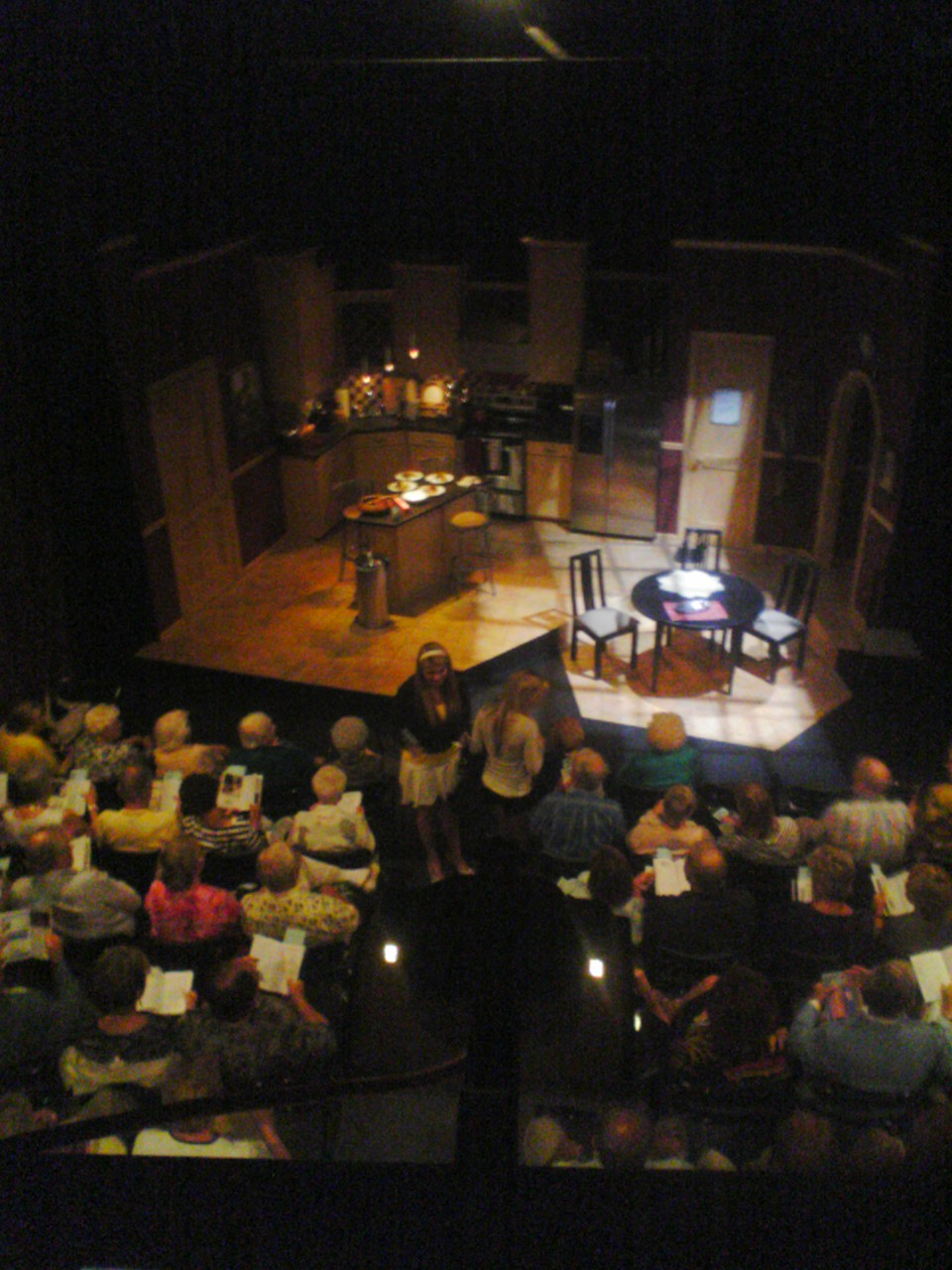
Tobye Studio Theatre

== Kizzie Theater ==
The Kizzie Theater is a 452-seat proscenium theatre, with "European" style seating, meaning the aisles are located on the left and right sides of the auditorium. The theatre features an orchestra pit and 66-foot-tall (20 m) fly tower with 29 lines of rigging to "fly" scenery and lights from overhead. There are four motorized lines dedicated to stage lighting, and 25 lines available for scenic use. The stage features a sprung floor which consists of plywood and pine strips constructed with rubber cushioning. This type of flooring "gives" on impact to reduce and prevent foot and leg injuries to dancers. The Kizzie is the "mainstage" performance space of the company, as well as the TNPA program.

== Price Studio Theater ==
The Price Studio Theatre is a 100-seat "Black Box" theatre in stage parlance. It is a flexible performance space, meaning the layout of the theatre can be changed to offer different seating and performance environments depending on need. The Price Studio has allowed the company to perform "edgier" material not necessarily suitable for a main stage environment such as The Goat or Who is Sylvia?,The Laramie Project. It is also used as a forum for more intimate stagings of classic plays such as The Lion In Winter and The Glass Menagerie. The space is also used for TNPA program performances and staged play readings through the company's Readers Theatre program.

== Glass Educational Theater ==
The Glass Educational Theater hosts performances, education programs, wellness workshops, and community events. Featuring a full-width window wall, the theater has full theatrical capabilities - including a tension grid - reflecting their commitment to innovation, access, and community-centered programming. It is largely used for TNPA productions, including student-produced shows, it also hosts showcases and Readers Theatre performances.

== Critical reception ==
In 2012, Smithsonian Magazine cited the company in naming Naples, Florida the Ninth "Best Small Town In America". In 2008, CNN and Money Magazine cited the company while recognizing Collier County, Florida as one of its "Best Places for a Long Life In The United States".
