= Christiaan Tonnis =

German painter, draftsman and artist (born 1956)

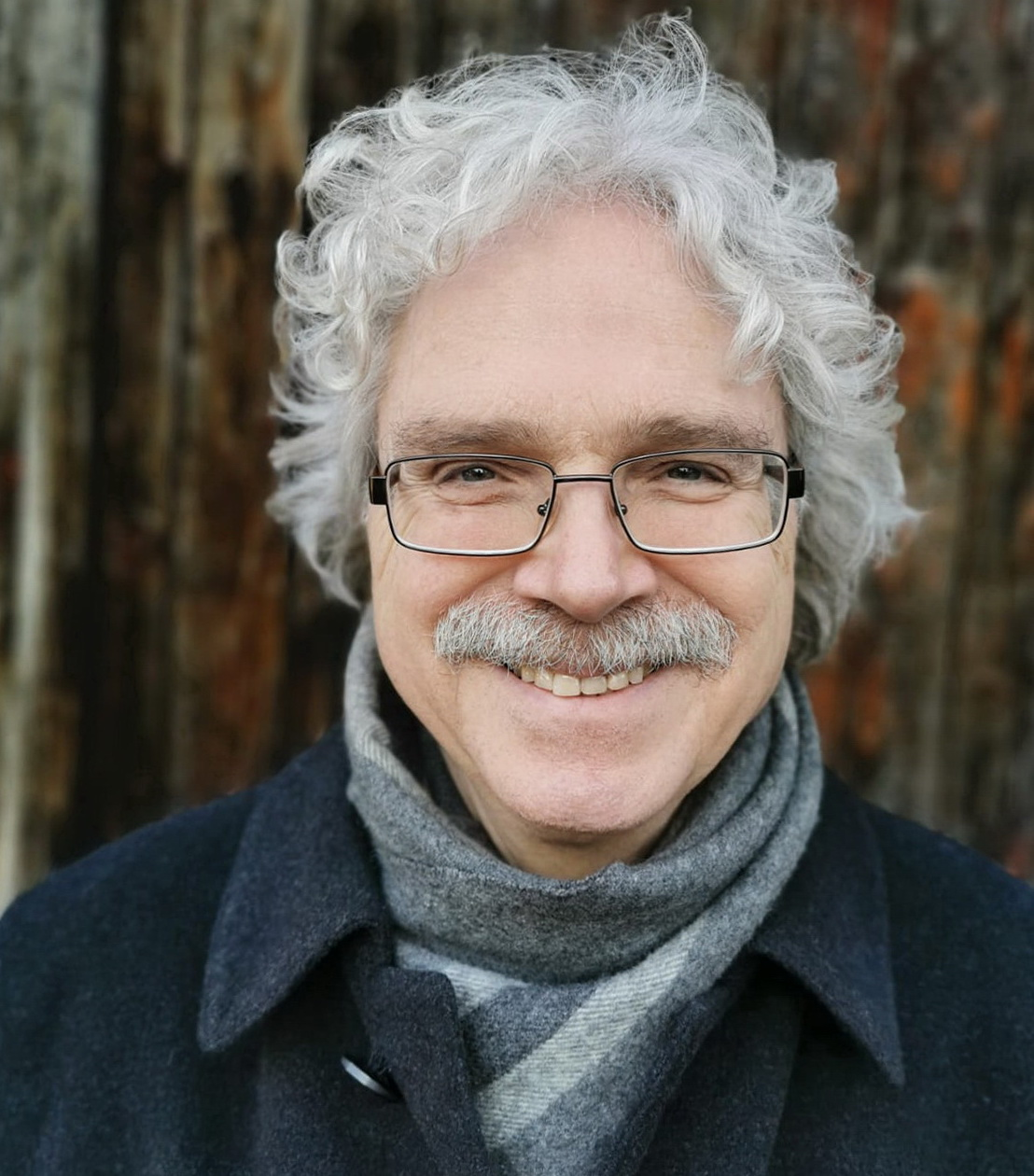
- Christiaan Tonnis in Hannover-Buchholz, 2024
- Born: 5 June 1956 (age 70); Saarbrücken, West Germany
- Education: Hochschule für Gestaltung Offenbach am Main
- Known for: Painting, video art
- Notable work: Ludwig Wittgenstein (1985), Virginia Woolf, William S. Burroughs (1998)
- Movement: Contemporary art

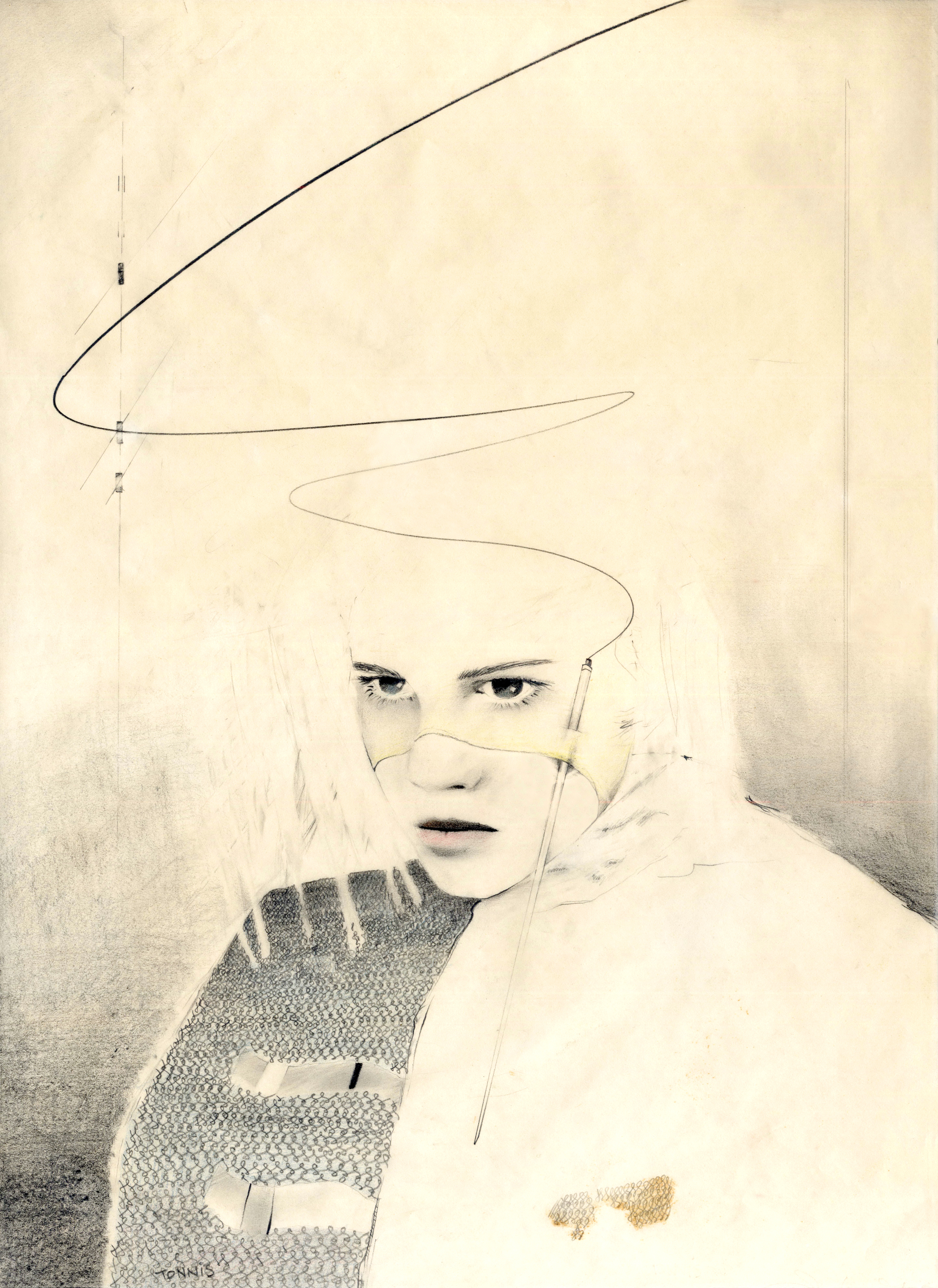
Female Warrior #6 "Behind the Line", Pencil on board, 1982

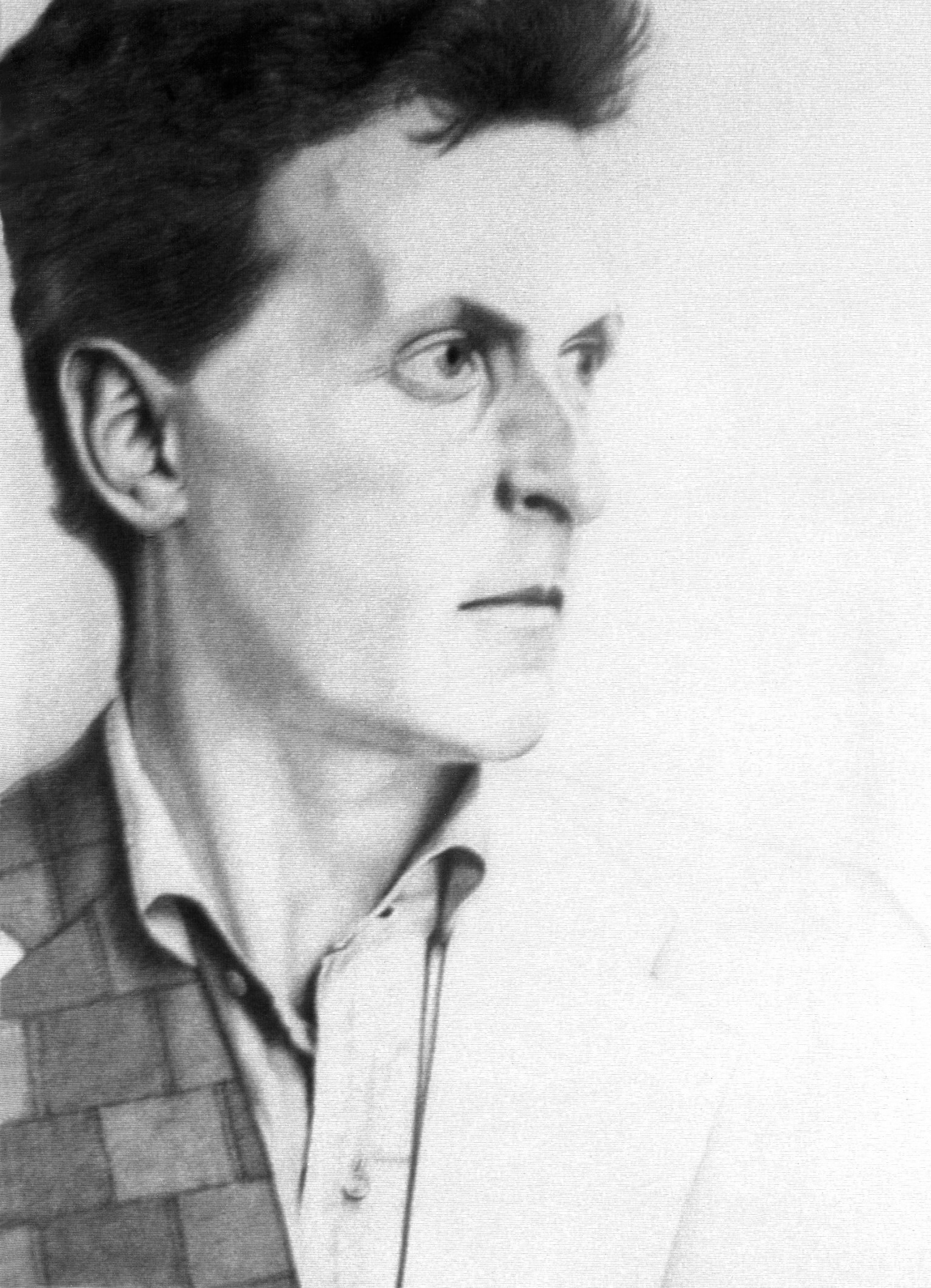
Ludwig Wittgenstein, Pencil on board, 1985

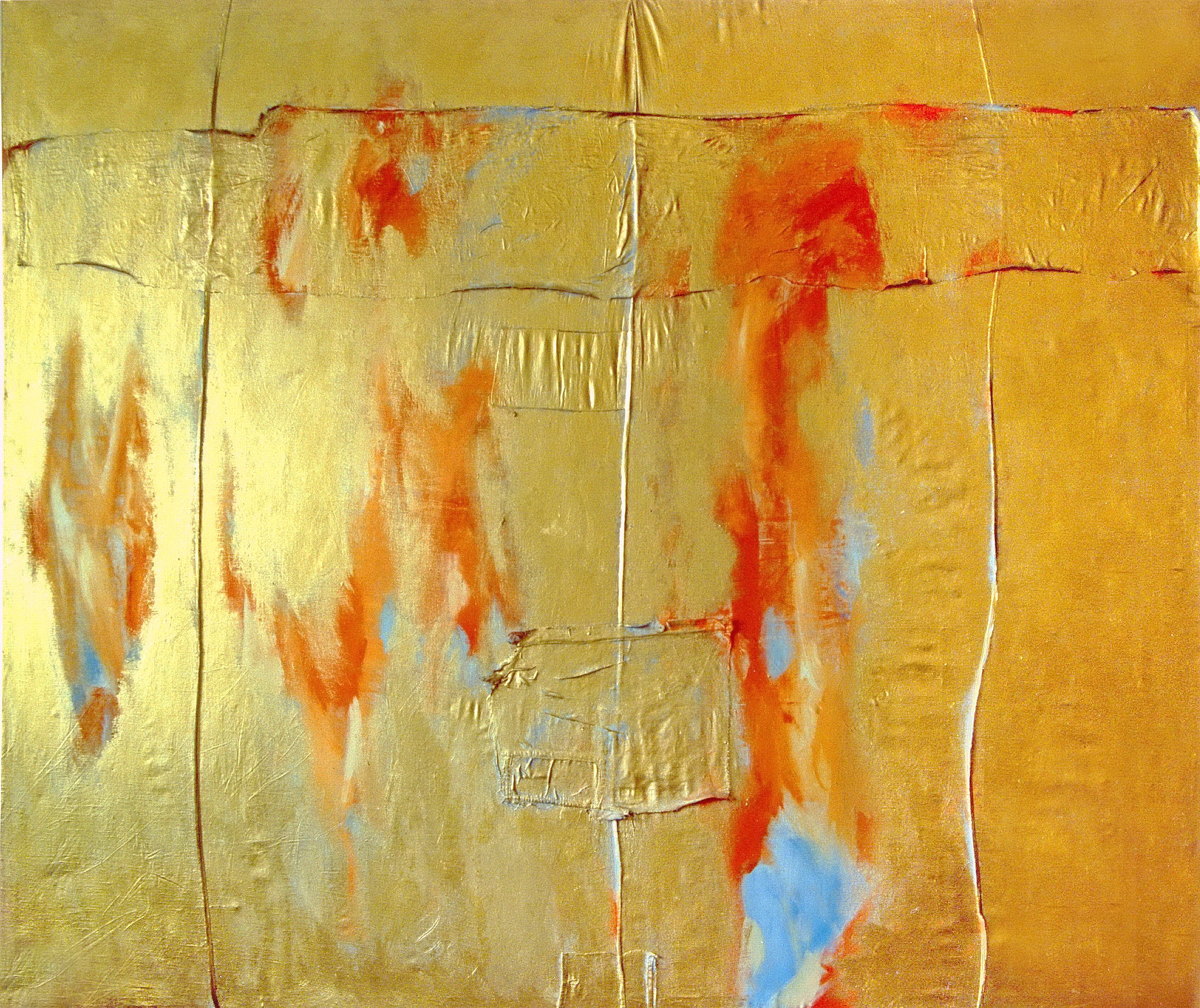
The Bible – Solomon – Song of Songs 8, 6-7, Acrylic, rich pale gold and cloth on linen, 1997

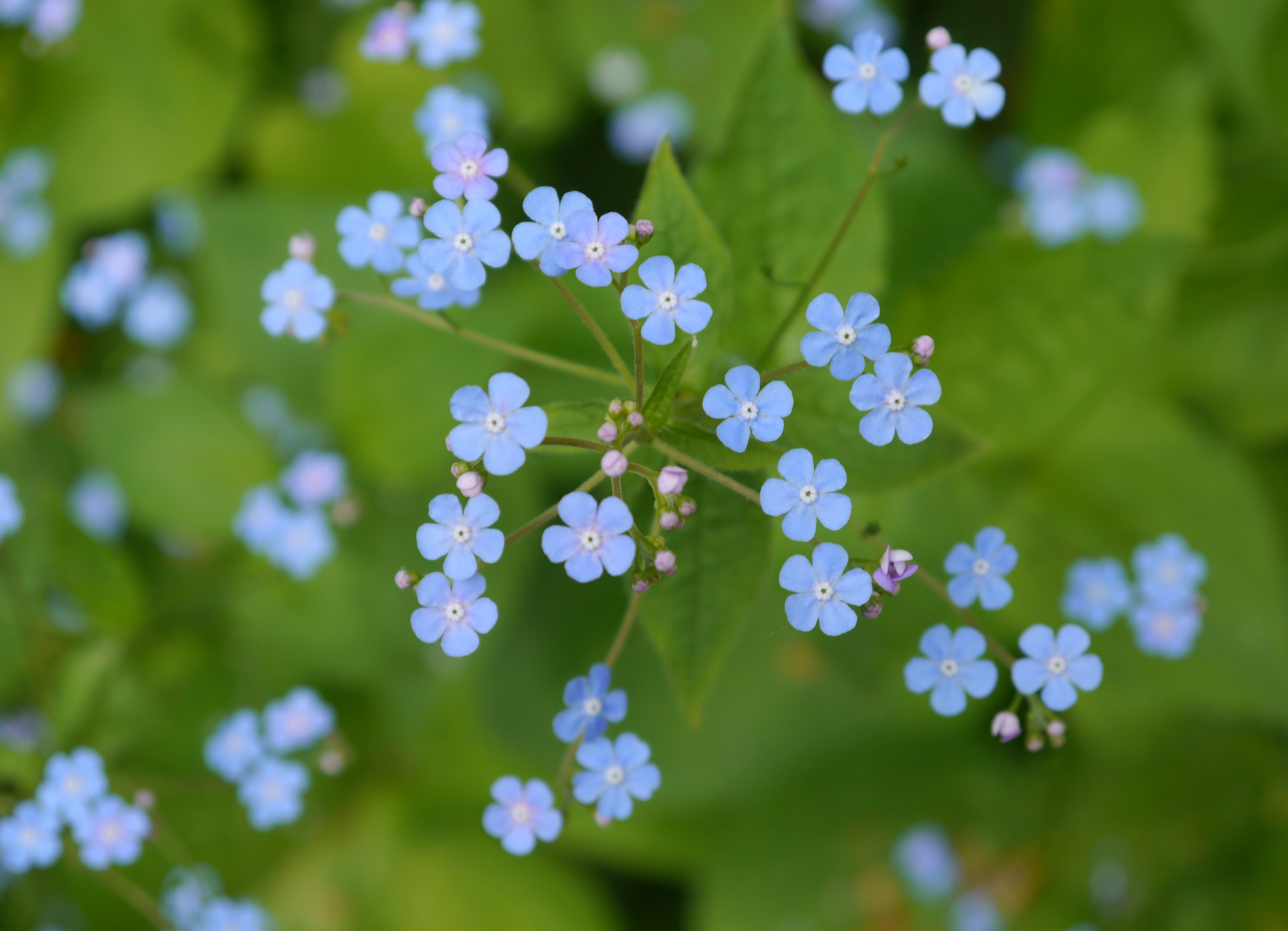
God gave us another Gift # 9 – Blue Flower – Novalis", Photography, 2013

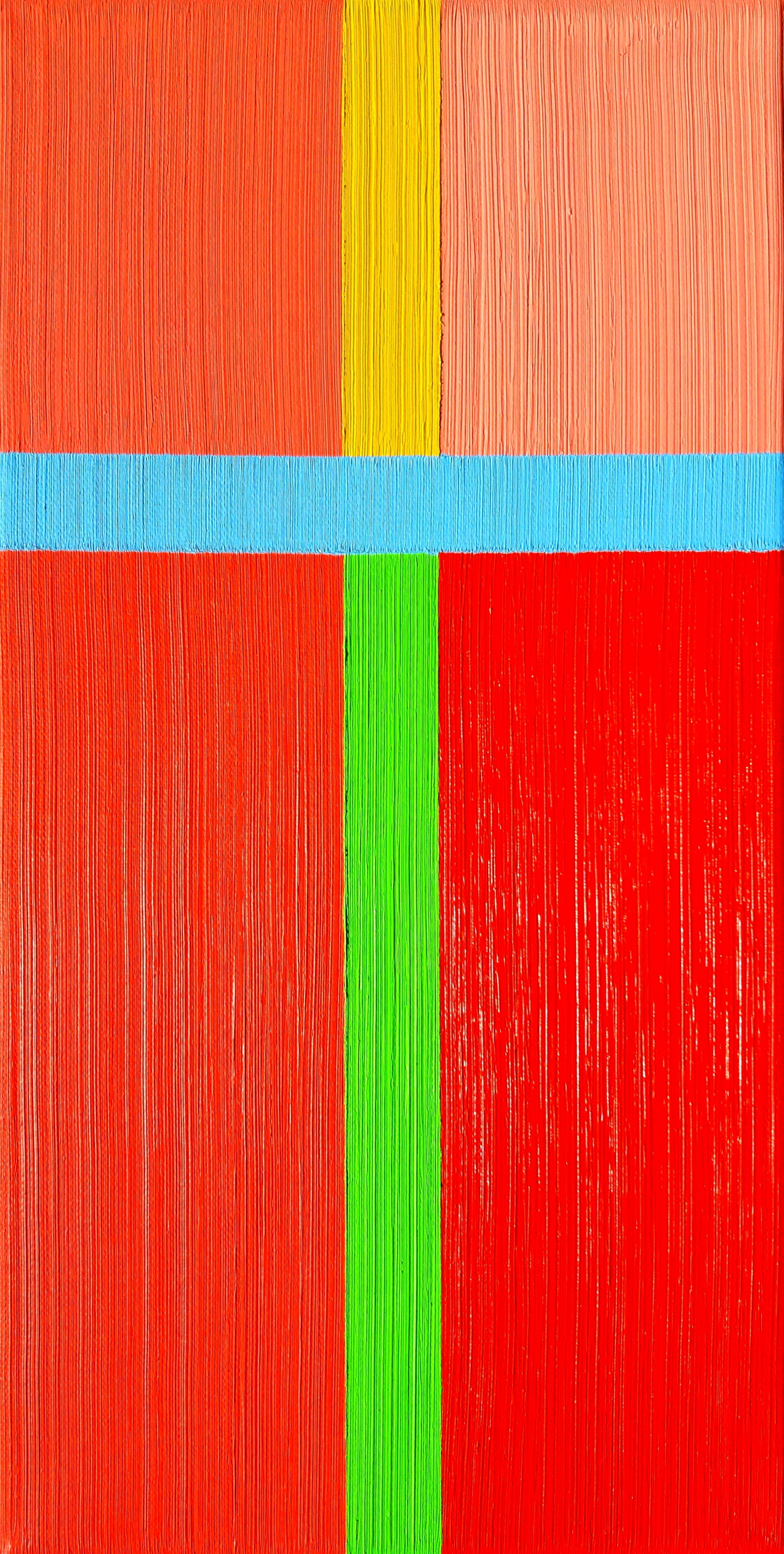
Christian Cross 5, Oil on canvas, 2020

Christiaan Dirk Tonnis (born 5 June 1956) is a German symbolist/realist painter, draftsman, video artist and published author. He studied at the HfG Offenbach with Dieter Lincke and Herbert Heckmann, and lives in Frankfurt, Germany.

== Work ==
Tonnis' works are "supported with psychological knowledge" His earliest drawings reflect his interest in psychoanalysis and psychopathology such as, catatonic rigidity or the postnatal psychosis depicted in his 1980–85 collection. To "show the psychic as a second face" he "uses stitchings, masks and fragments of masks—they are sometimes barely visible"

... in his portraits the artist Christiaan Tonnis shows us the tears in the psyche that are written into faces. In these paintings these faces are, as it were, stage areas of a forgotten Drama, only readable as old and rigid courses of action but with traces of the internal (hidden) foreigner ...

— Kai Hoffmann, Frankfurter Rundschau, 1986-02-20

In 1986, he started to paint landscapes from literature like the "Magic Mountain (after Thomas Mann)" and portraits of writers and philosophers as William S. Burroughs, Virginia Woolf, Ludwig Wittgenstein, and more. His large scale triptych "Frost" is "a material image in harsh black and white which depicts a literary landscape of snow and ice in different viewpoints [...] a picturesque transformation of Thomas Bernhards 1963 novel".

Since 2003 his work has become more meditative: "Geometric patterns in bright colors", consistent with Tibetan Book of the Dead (Bardo Thodol) and New Testament—the series of minimalistic "Meditation pictures".

"Catwalk!" was exhibited at the Showroom Eulengasse in Frankfurt, Germany in 2007. The exhibition consisted of a series of collages created of cats' heads on women's bodies. The most recognizable bodies are those of Virginia Woolf "with big, sad eyes" and Kate Moss.

In 2006 Tonnis set up a MySpace page dedicated to Thomas Bernhard, using pictures tell his biography. The theme of the page was Bernhard's motto "In the darkness everything becomes clear."

In 2008 Tonnis started to contribute reviews on art to the style magazine Dazed Digital, London.

2009: During the "Sommeratelier" at Kunstverein Familie Montez, Frankfurt, he created a painting for the performance "Who let the dogs out, Edith?". This "experimental collage of different media and arts" has been a dialogue with Heinrich von Kleist's play Penthesilea, directed by Hans-Jürgen Syberberg in 1988 with actress Edith Clever.

With the mural of a golden cross on black and violet ground—divided into pixels—Tonnis has been one of 36 international artists who designed the "Pixelkitchen" in January 2013, a tiled room of 177.2 inches height at the Günes Theatre in Frankfurt. "All these artworks are glued, painted or nailed onto the walls."

On June 20, 2021, Tonnis performed "Novalis" as a live stream at the Eulengasse exhibition space. In his glowing hand he held a bouquet of blue flowers and used them to write two passages from Novalis' novel Heinrich von Ofterdingen on a large scale horizon. The inscription of a poetic text from the early Romantic period is to be read “as an alternative to our swaying world that has gotten out of joint”.

Christiaan Tonnis is a member of the St. Paulsgemeinde Frankfurt, which is holding church service at the Old St Nicholas Church, and the Internationale Novalisgesellschaft.

=== Video ===
Tonnis started to make videos in 2006. His subjects have included William S. Burroughs, Thomas Bernhard and the poet Georg Trakl. Alongside these works stand the video series of "Dreams", "Electrical Pictures", and animals—exhibiting a pop, surreal pictorial language, often humorously staged.

Since 2009 Tonnis produced 136 short documentaries about art projects, exhibition setups, openings and interviews for the Kunstverein Familie Montez. Of these, 16 works from December 2020 show the process of creating an 18 × 3.25 meter mural that was created by more than 40 artists in the joint project "Ein ganz normaler Herbst, nur anders ... 2020" ("A completely normal autumn, just different ... 2020). The short documentaries go together with a "Family Album", created out of video stills.

== Solo exhibitions (selection) ==
- 1986: Zeichnungen, Galerie Das Bilderhaus, Frankfurt
- 1986: Zeichnungen, Galerie 42, Gießen
- 1989: Christiaan Tonnis, Galerie Einbaum, Frankfurt
- 1990: Christiaan Tonnis, Galerie Limberg, Frankfurt
- 2006: Dialog, Kunstverein Eulengasse, Frankfurt
- 2006: Zeichnung und Malerei, Höpershof, Hannover-Wedemark
- 2007: CATWALK!, Kunstverein Eulengasse, Frankfurt
- 2010: Hinter dem Spiegel (with a performance by Eva Moll), Klosterpresse, Frankfurt
- 2011: Christiaan Tonnis: Thomas Bernhards "Frost", Kunstverein Eulengasse, Frankfurt
- 2019: Christiaan Tonnis – Screening Montez 2009–14, Kunstverein Familie Montez, Frankfurt
- 2021: Christiaan Tonnis – Novalis (Performance), Kunstverein Eulengasse, Frankfurt

== Group exhibitions and festivals (selection) ==
- 2007: Sem Palavras / Ohne Worte, Instituto Histórico de Olinda, Olinda
- 2008: Antarctic Meltdown, Melbourne International Arts Festival, Melbourne
- 2008: Sanlu Yishu, Huajiadi Beili Wangjing, Beijing
- 2008: Digital Fringe 08, Melbourne Fringe Festival, Melbourne
- 2008: Road Movie, Frieze Film at 6. Frieze Art Fair and Channel 4, London
- 2008: Electrofringe, This Is Not Art, Newcastle
- 2009: Gut ist was gefällt, Kunstverein Familie Montez, Frankfurt
- 2010: 2009 Was A Rough Year – Lilly McElroy, Thomas Robertello Gallery, Chicago
- 2012: Terremoto – Beben, by Nikolaus A. Nessler, in collaboration with Christiaan Tonnis (Film), Nico Rocznik (Light) and Manuel Stein (Sound), Kunsthaus Wiesbaden
- 2013: Wurzeln weit mehr Aufmerksamkeit widmen, Kunstverein Familie Montez and Der Laden/Bauhaus University, Weimar
- 2014: Les Fleurs du Mal – Dithering Cities, Luminale, Frankfurt
- 2015: Kunst Messe Frankfurt 15, Kunstverein Familie Montez, Hall 1.2, Messe GmbH, Frankfurt
- 2017: Supermarket 2017, Stockholm Independent Art Fair, Stockholm
- 2018: Quinceañera, Kunstverein Eulengasse, Frankfurt
- 2018: Supermarket Art Fair, Daily Film Documentation of Performances, Stockholm
- 2019: Latitudes Festival, Santa Cruz de la Sierra
- 2019: Open/Occupy II, Kunstfabrik am Flutgraben, Berlin
- 2020: Ein ganz normaler Herbst, nur anders ..., Kunstverein Familie Montez, Frankfurt
- 2021: Platforms Project Net 2021, Platforms Project – Independent Art Fair, Athens
- 2021: be**pART, Atelier Montez, Rome
- 2022: Kurswechsel, Kunstverein Eulengasse, Frankfurt
- 2023: it's about community ..., TOR Art Space, Frankfurt
- 2024: Mythos - Malerei, Klosterpresse, Frankfurt
- 2025: Stadt.Licht. Frankfurter Fotograf*innen, BBK, Frankfurt
- 2026: Christoph liest, with Christoph Gérard Stein, Edda Rössler and Christiaan Tonnis, Kunstverein Familie Montez, Frankfurt

=== Curated exhibitions ===
- 2011: Schamanismus aus dem Großen Altai, Kunstverein Eulengasse, Frankfurt
- 2011: Meg Cebula. Geheimnis und Schönheit, Kunstverein Eulengasse, Frankfurt

== Literature ==
- Marlies ter Borg: Bipolar creativity: through the ages, Independently published, 2021-02-16, p. 69, back cover, ISBN 979-8708860545
- David Bramwell and Joe Tinsley: The Odysseum: Strange journeys that obliterated convention, Chambers, London, 2018, p. 137, ISBN 978-1-473-66898-0
- ROT – Das Magazin des Kunstvereins Eulengasse, Axel Dielmann-Verlag, Frankfurt, 2013, p. 15-16, 145, 148-149, 15, ISBN 978-3-86638-180-3
- Kerstin Krone-Bayer and Hanna Rut Neidhardt (Publishers): Montez im Exil – Kunstverein Familie Montez, Frankfurt, 2014, ISBN 978-3-00-045918-4

== Bibliography ==
- Krankheit als Symbol, Berlin Pro Business, 1. Edition 2006-11-03, 2006, ISBN 978-3-939533-34-4
- Christiaan Tonnis, Oswald-von-Nell-Breuning-Schule and the town of Rödermark: 5+5=1!, DVD-Video (25 min.), 2011, archived at the town of Rödermark
- Familie Hecht – Eine Erinnerung, 2017, DVD-Video, in collaboration with the Oswald-von-Nell-Breuning-School, Rödermark, archived at the Jewish Museum Frankfurt
- Die Leipziger Baumwollspinnerei, epubli Verlag Berlin, 2017, ISBN 978-3-7450-7655-4
- Das grafische Werk: 2006–2017, epubli Verlag Berlin, 2017, ISBN 978-3-7450-6724-8
- Videos 2009–2017, Kunstverein Familie Montez, Werkverzeichnis, epubli Verlag Berlin, 2017, ISBN 978-3-7450-0580-6
- Copy and Paste, epubli Verlag Berlin, 2017, ISBN 978-3-7450-9175-5
- Texte und Schriften: 1986–2017, epubli Verlag Berlin, 2017, ISBN 978-3-7450-3054-9
- Catwalk: Die Collagen, epubli Verlag Berlin, 2019, ISBN 978-3-7502-5286-8
- Copy and Paste 2, epubli Verlag Berlin, 2021, ISBN 978-3-7541-6369-6
- Das grafische Werk: 2006–2022, epubli Verlag Berlin, 2022, ISBN 978-3-7565-4231-4
- Das fotografische Werk 1, epubli Verlag Berlin, 2022, ISBN 978-3-75-6550-60-9
- Das fotografische Werk 2, epubli Verlag Berlin, 2022, ISBN 978-3-75-6551-23-1
- Das fotografische Werk 3, epubli Verlag Berlin, 2023, ISBN 978-3-757510-99-2
- Virginia Woolf, Georg Trakl, Thomas Bernhard, Ludwig Wittgenstein, William S. Burroughs und Jacob Böhme treffen sich im Café Tomaselli — epubli Verlag Berlin, 2026, ISBN 978-3-56542807-6
- Die Schere und das Licht: William S. Burroughs auf dem Weg nach Salzburg zu einer unmöglichen Begegnung, epubli Verlag Berlin, 2026, ISBN 978-3-565499-10-6
- Gefallene Sterne - Virginia Woolfs tragische Literatur, epubli Verlag Berlin, 2026, ISBN 978-3-565-63859-8
- Die Seele der Kunst - Über den schöpferischen Prozess, epubli Verlag Berlin, 2026, ISBN 978-3-565763-31-3
