= Black box theater =

Simple performance space with black walls

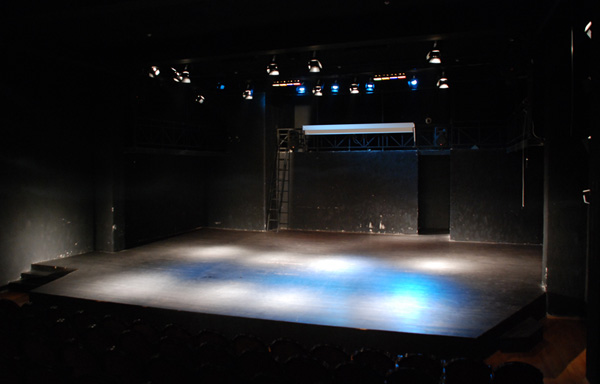
Rustaveli Theatre

A black box theater is a performance space, typically a square or rectangular room, with black walls and a black, flat floor. The simplicity of the space allows it to host a variety of stage configurations, lighting, and audiences.

== History ==
Black box theaters have their roots in the American avant-garde work of the early 20th century. The black box theaters became popular and increasingly widespread in the 1960s as rehearsal spaces. Almost any large room can be transformed into a "black box" with the aid of paint or curtains, making black box theaters an easily accessible option for theater artists. Storefronts, church basements, and old trolley barns were some examples of the earliest versions of spaces transformed into black box theaters. Sets are simple and small and costs are lower, appealing to nonprofit and low-income artists or companies. The black box is also considered by many to be a place where more "pure" theatre can be explored, with the most human and least technical elements in focus.

The concept of a building designed for flexible staging techniques can be attributed to Swiss designer Adolphe Appia, circa 1921. The invention of such a stage instigated a half-century of innovations in the relationship between audience and performers. This idea would again be re-visited by Harley Granville Barker, using Appia's design as his basis. Barker would have ideas of directing productions in “a great white box,” which would see success in 1970. As time went on, black boxes became popular as black provided the most neutral setting for productions. Antonin Artaud also had ideas of a stage of this kind. The first flexible stage in America was located in the home living room of actor and manager Gilmor Brown in Pasadena, California. While the domestic decor meant that Brown's stage was not a traditional black box, the idea was still a revolutionary one. This venue, and two subsequent permutations, are known as the Playbox Theatre, and functioned as an experimental space for Brown's larger venue, the Pasadena Playhouse.

== Design ==
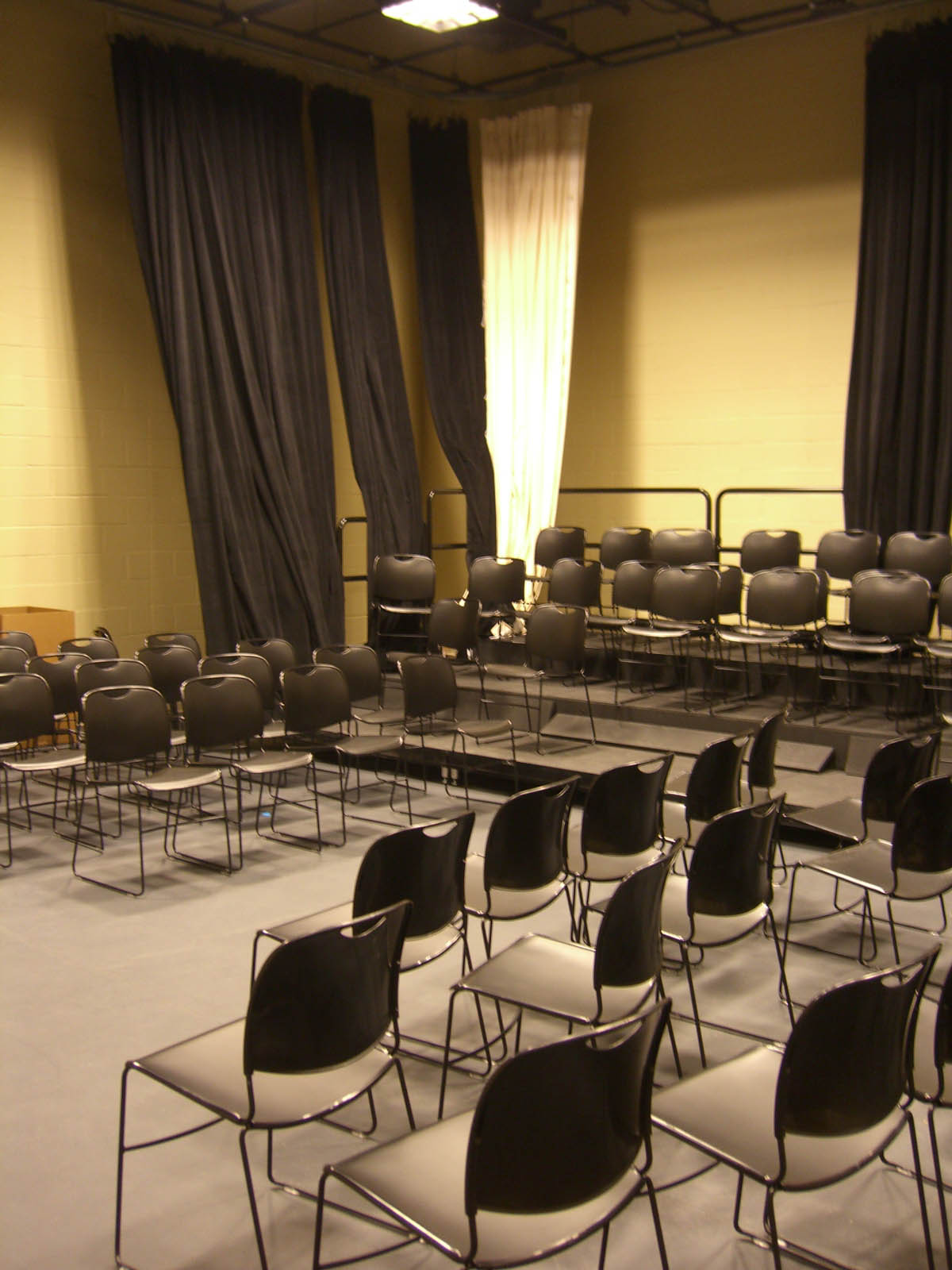
A black box theater used by drama students in Union City High School in New Jersey.

Many older black boxes were built like television studios, with a low pipe grid overhead. Newer black boxes typically feature catwalks or tension grids, the latter combining the flexibility of the pipe grid with the accessibility of a catwalk. The interiors of a black box theaters are most painted black, although that is not a requirement to earn the moniker.

Lighting must often be reconsidered with each production, as the absence of a fixed stage or seating layout requires designers to reconfigure technical elements from scratch. Directors and actors must also account for the close proximity of the audience, adjusting movement, blocking, and projection to suit the space.

Black box theaters usually host plays or other performances requiring very basic technical arrangements, such as limited set construction. Common floor plans include thrust stage, modified thrust stage, and theater-in-the-round.

== Popular usage ==
Universities and other theater training programs often employ the black box theater because the space is versatile and easy to change. The black backdrop can focus the audience's attention on the actors. Many theater training programs will have both a large proscenium theater, as well as a black box theater. Not only does this allow two productions to be mounted simultaneously, but they can also have a large extravagant production in the main stage while having a small experimental show in the black box.

Black box spaces are also popular at fringe theater festivals; due to their simple design and equipment they can be used for several different performances in a day. This simplicity also means that a black box theater can be created from other spaces, such as hotel conference rooms. This is common at the Edinburgh Festival Fringe where the larger venues will hire entire buildings and divide each room to be rented out to several theater companies. "The Black Box Theatre" in Oslo, Norway, and the Alvina Krause Studio at Northwestern University are theaters of this type.

== See also ==
- Dogville (2003) and Manderlay (2005), two Lars von Trier films akin to black box theater
