= Catwalk! =

Series of collages by Christiaan Tonnis

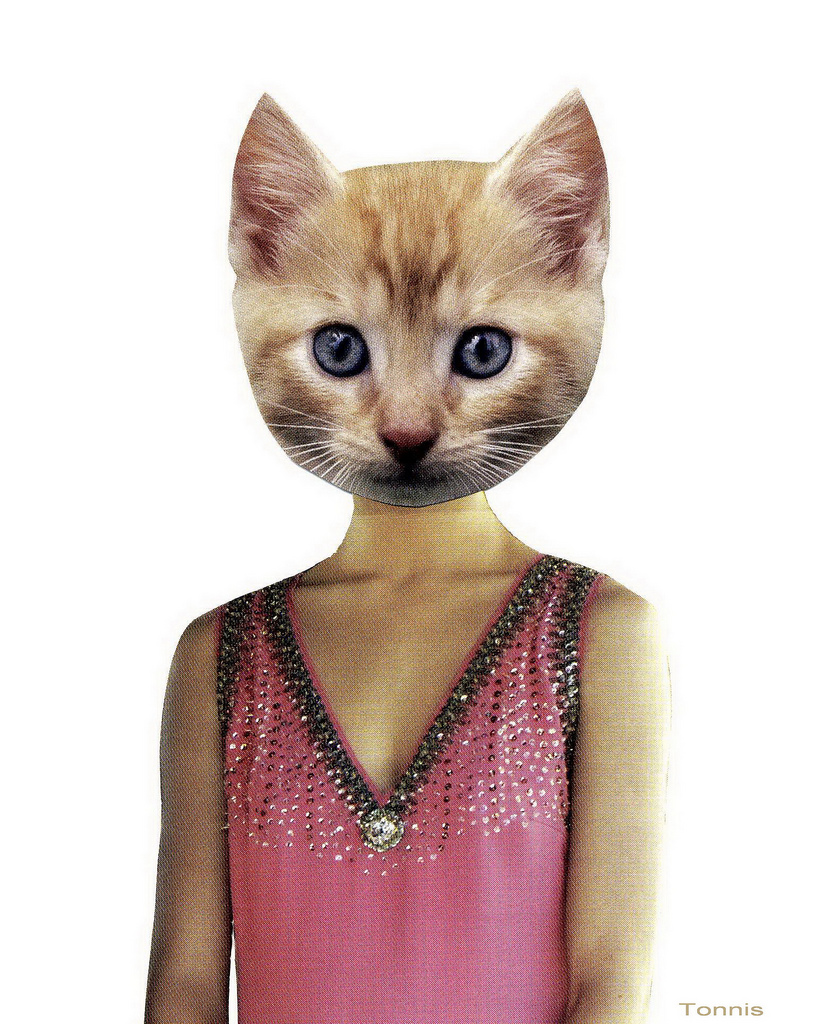
Virginia Woolf, 2006, Collage on paper

Catwalk! is a series of collages created by Christiaan Tonnis.

== Description ==
Catwalk! exhibits a series of collages created of cat's heads on women's physiques. The most known physiques displayed are those of Virginia Woolf "with big, sad eyes" and Kate Moss.

== Video ==
The video "Catwalk" has been shown in 2007 at blogs.elle.fr.

== Exhibitions ==
- 2007 "CATWALK!", Eulengasse, Frankfurt
- 2007 "Sem Palavras/Ohne Worte", Instituto Histórico de Olinda, Olinda
- 2009 "Traumwelten/CATWALK!", Burg Frauenstein, Mining am Inn
