= Tension grid =

Type of catwalk or structural system

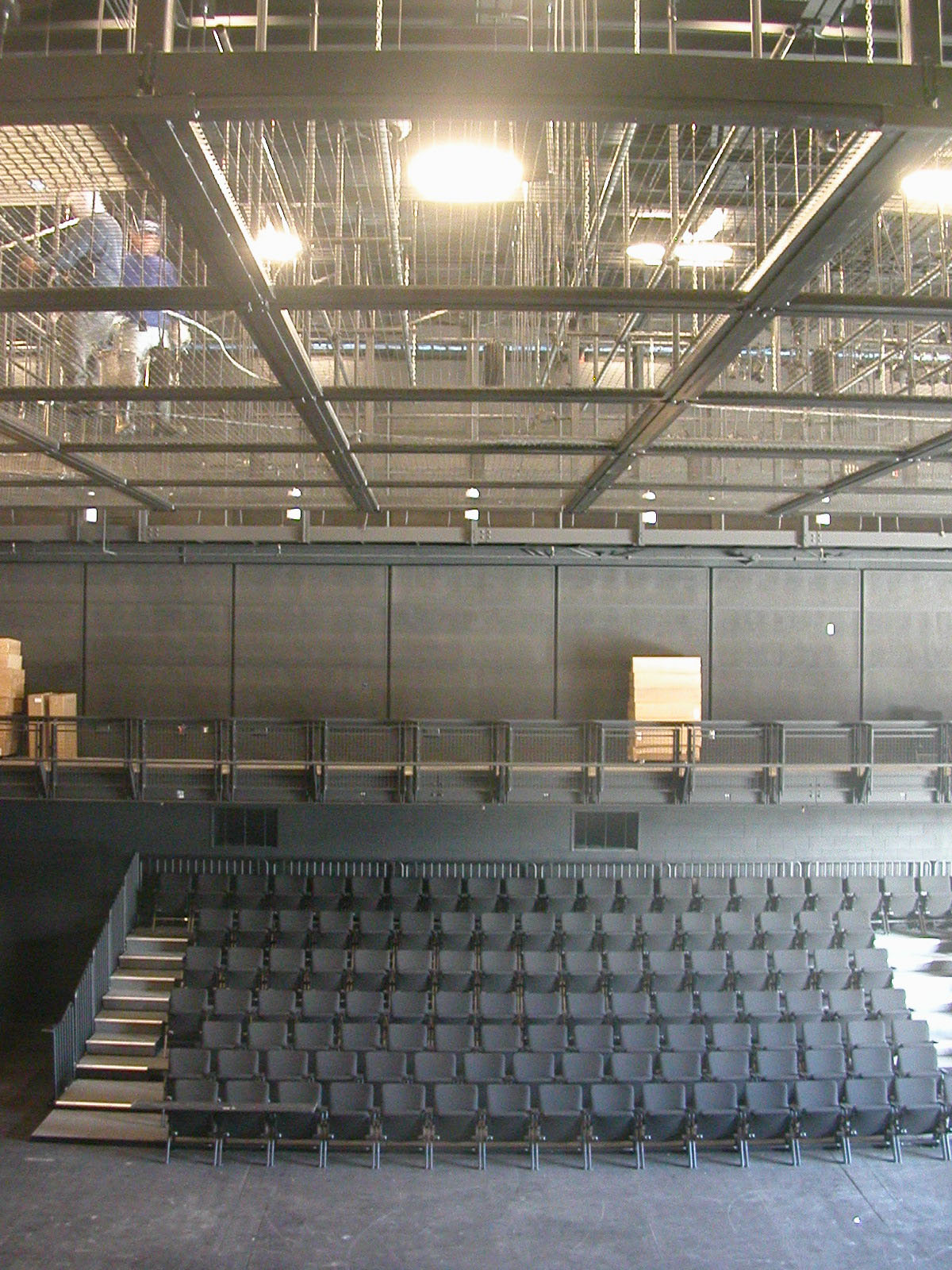
Tension grid assembly with removable modules at La Jolla Playhouse's Potiker Theater

A tension grid is a type of non-standard largely-transparent catwalk or structural system. Tension grids are composed of tightly woven wire rope steel cables that create a taut floor strong enough for technicians to walk on.

== Benefits ==
Lighting instruments can be hung on a pipe grid just above the tension grid; there is no need for holes, as the light can shine through the grid, virtually unobstructed, to the stage. Cables and electrical wires can pass through, and special fixtures may be used to allow beams and other solid material to pass through.

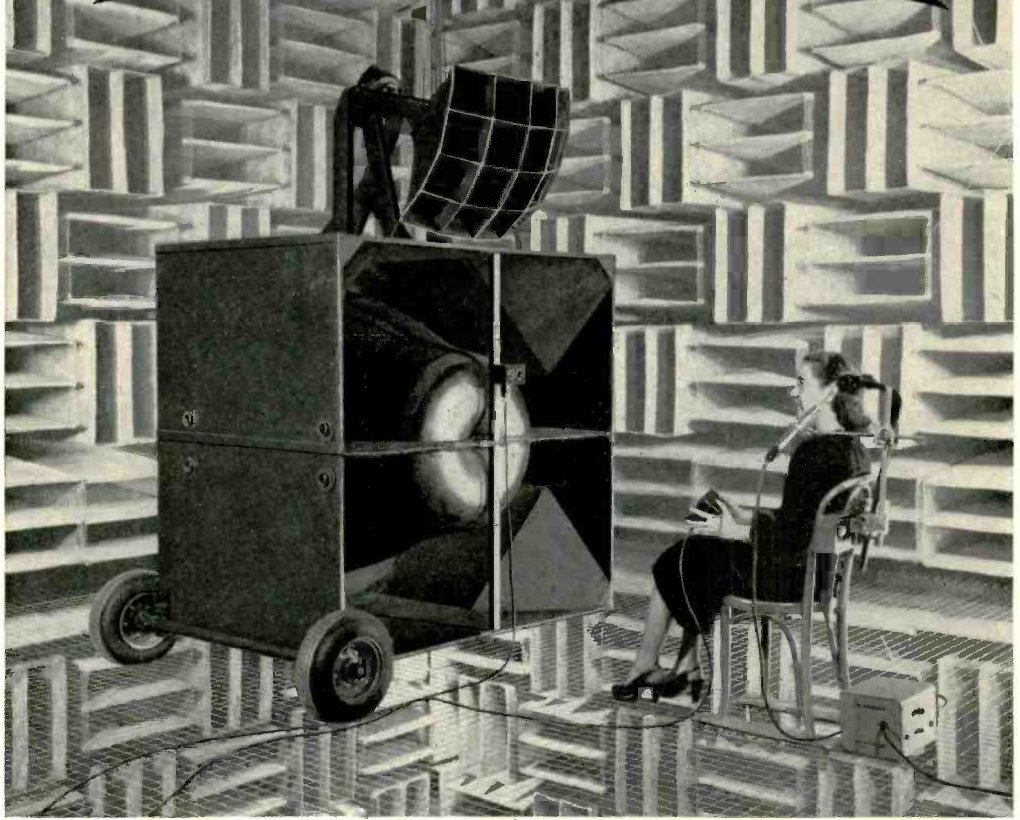
A tension grid forming the floor of an AT&T anechoic chamber

Originally developed for use as a floor in anechoic chambers, this style of catwalk is popular in new and remodeled theatres due to the flexibility it provides. Use of a tension grid does not require working off of edges as a traditional catwalk does, as lights are over the walking surface, not next to it. As a result, many consider tension grids safer in terms of risk of falling.

Wall to wall wire grids are impossible to fall through making them a better solution than catwalks in venues where students or volunteers might work.

== Costs ==
Tension wire grids require periodic inspections. Lights shining through the tension grid light up a section of the grid itself, which some audience members find distracting. The cables of the grid absorb and redirect some of the light from a fixture, leading to a negligible loss in total light output. Working on a tension grid can take time to get used to because of the compliant nature of the surface. This motion coupled with the illusion of no floor can be disconcerting to some.

Most tension grids do not meet the structural standards of a traditional catwalk. The number of technicians permitted to work on a tension grid simultaneously can be limited, relative to a standard catwalk, due to relatively low load ratings.

== Construction ==
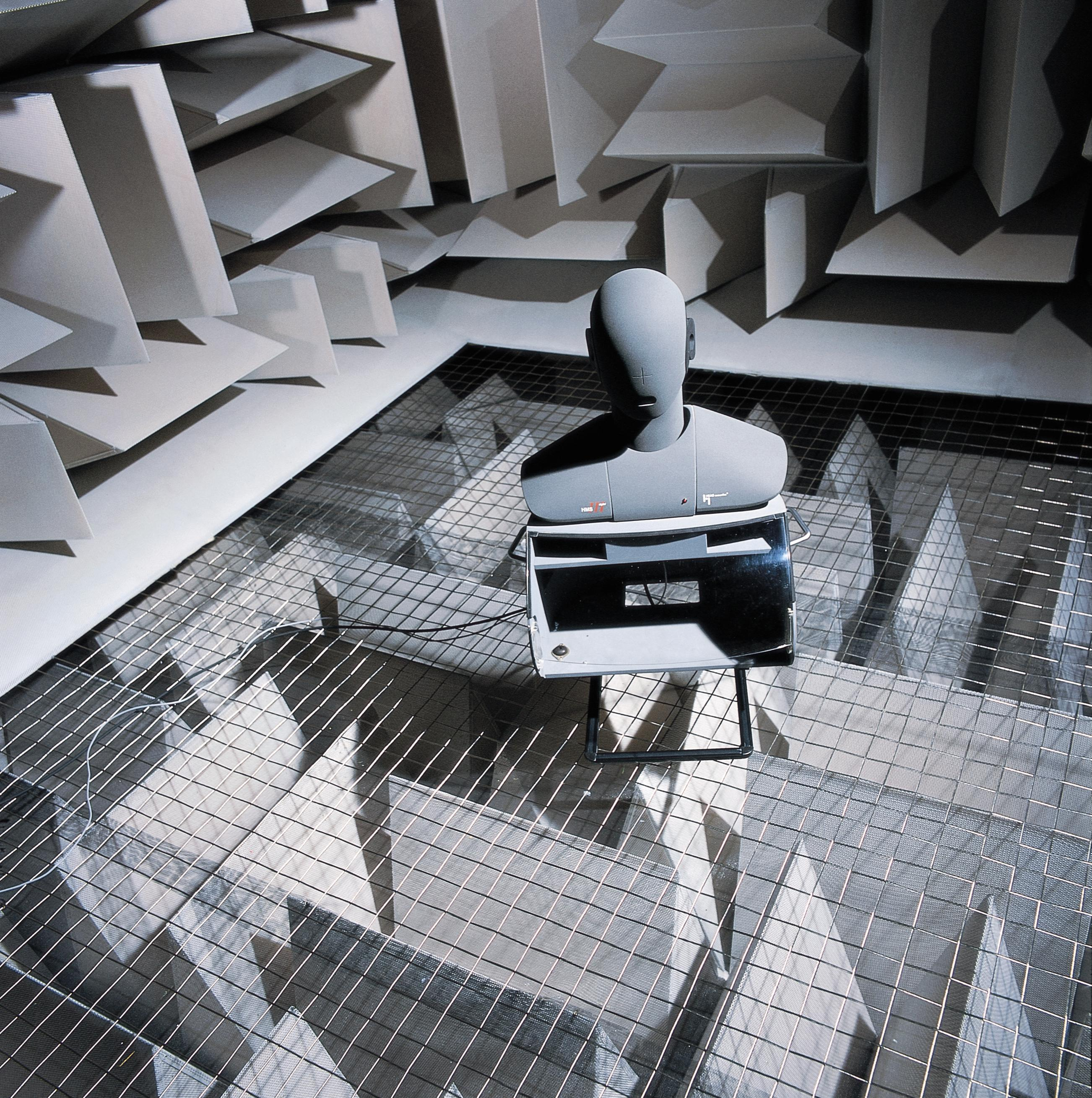
Close-up of an anechoic chamber tension grid from above

Tension grids for theatrical catwalks are typically constructed of 1/8" diameter galvanized aircraft cable woven into a taut grid with 2" spacing, which corresponds to an open area (transparency) of approximately 94%. Swaged fittings terminate the ends of the cables, which are secured at a perimeter frame. Tension grid frames are typically made of steel channel or rectangular tubing. Tension grid assemblies are often made up of tension grid modules arranged in a grid and resting on support structure or suspended from roof structure above.
