= Hiwassee =

The name Hiwassee is derived from the Cherokee word Ayuhwasi, meaning "savanna" or "large meadow". The name has been applied to several entities past and present in the U.S. states of Georgia, North Carolina, and Tennessee:

== Bodies of water ==
- Hiwassee Lake, the reservoir created by Hiwassee Dam
- Hiwassee River, a tributary of the Tennessee River in northern Georgia, western North Carolina, and eastern Tennessee

== Towns ==
- Ducktown, Tennessee, called Hiawassee in the 1840s–1850s
- Hiawassee, Georgia, a town
- Hiwasse, Arkansas, a town
- Great Hiwassee, a Cherokee village once located along the Hiwassee River in Polk County, Tennessee
- Hiwassee, North Carolina, a small community adjacent to Hiwassee Dam
- Little Hiwassee, a Cherokee village once located along the Hiwassee River in Cherokee County, North Carolina
- Hiwassee, Virginia, a census-designated place in Virginia

== Other ==
- Hiwassee College, a college in Madisonville, Tennessee
- Hiwassee Dam, a hydroelectric dam on the Hiwassee River in Cherokee County, North Carolina
- USS Hiwassee (AOG-29), a 1944 Mettawee-class gasoline tanker
