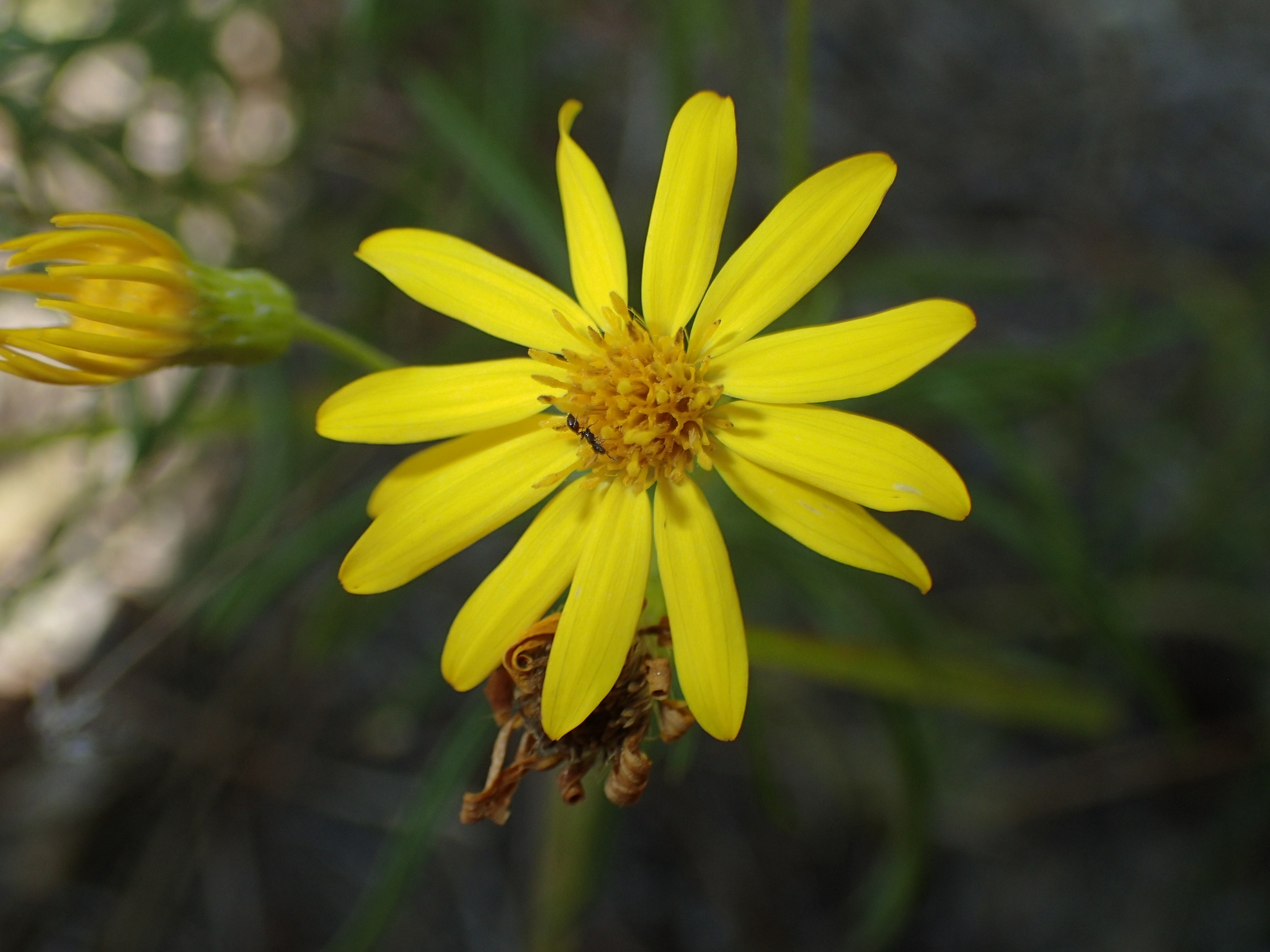

Conservation status
- Vulnerable (NatureServe)

Scientific classification
- Kingdom: Plantae
- Clade: Tracheophytes
- Clade: Angiosperms
- Clade: Eudicots
- Clade: Asterids
- Order: Asterales
- Family: Asteraceae
- Genus: Pityopsis
- Species: P. falcata

Binomial name
- Pityopsis falcata (Pursh) Nutt.

Synonyms
- List: Inula falcata Pursh (1813); Inula mariana var. falcata (Pursh) Nutt. (1818); Chrysopsis falcata (Pursh) Elliot (1823); Diplogon falcatum (Pursh) Kuntze (1891); Heterotheca falcata (Pursh) V.L. Harms (1969)

= Pityopsis falcata =

Species of plant

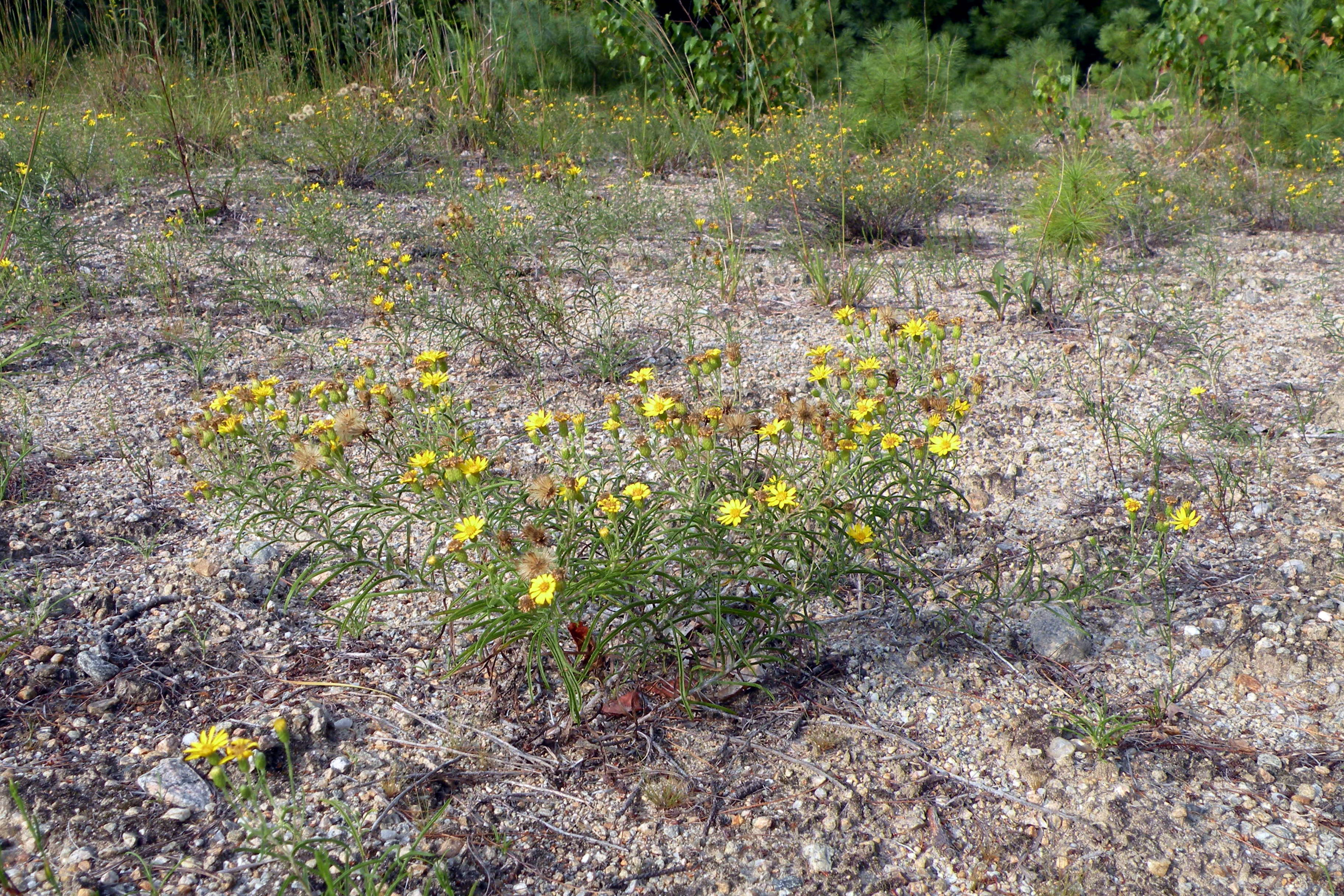
Growing on till in Rhode Island

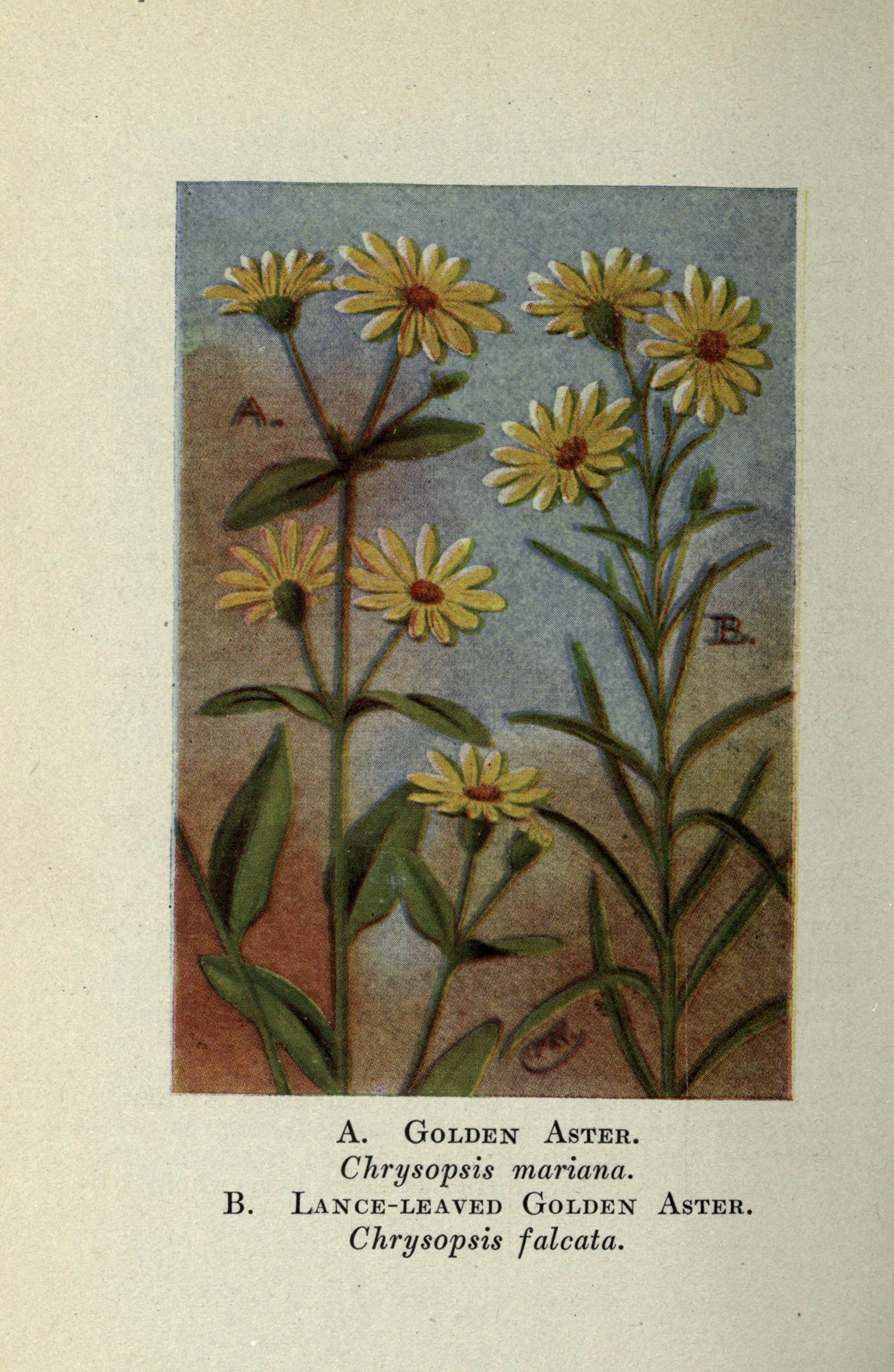
Botanical illustration

Pityopsis falcata, commonly known as sickleleaf silkgrass, sickle-leaved golden aster, and New England Golden aster, is perennial plant in the family Asteraceae native to the northeastern Atlantic Coastal Plain of the United States.

== Description ==
P. falcata is an herbaceous perennial that reaches 10-40 cm in height. It is characteristically caespitose, arising from a dense mass of fibrous roots and rhizomes. The erect stems are sometimes branched, occasionally reddish-brown in color, striated, and covered in long silky hairs.

The basal leaves usually wither by the time the plant flowers, and are shorter than the cauline leaves. The sessile cauline leaves are covered in trichomes, falcate in shape (giving the species its epithet falcata), and often folded along the midvein.

The flowerheads, usually 4-10 but upwards up 25 per plant, are arranged in corymbiform arrays. The peduncles are 1-4 cm long, have sparse bracts, and are covered in fine white woolly hair. The involucres are bell-shaped, 5-8 mm. The phyllaries are in series of 5-6, with tufts of hairs at the top. There are 9-15 yellow ray florets and 30-60 disc florets. P. falcata blooms throughout the summer and fall.

The fruits are fusiform cypselae, 3-4 mm in length. They are wind-dispersed, with pappi 4-6 mm long.

P. falcata has a chromosome count of $2n=9_{II}$ (or $2n = 18$). The most recent phylogenetic analyses indicate that it is most closely related to P. ruthii, with the two being considered sister species.

== Range and Habitat ==
P. falcata has a very limited range, being restricted to coastal areas between Cape Cod and the New Jersey Pine Barrens. It is often locally abundant, growing in open areas on sandy glacial till that was deposited along the front of the Wisconsin Glaciation. It is the northernmost species of the genus Pityopsis, being native to Connecticut, Massachusetts, New Jersey, New York, and Rhode Island.

In 1949, a specimen of P. falcata was collected along Canadian National Railway tracks west of Toronto. This is the only reported occurrence of the species in Canada and was apparently a vagrant individual.

In 1955, a specimen reported as P. falcata was collected along a beach in St. Petersburg, Florida. It is likely that this was a misidentified individual of P. tracyi, which is common in the state.

== Ecology ==
Where they co-occur, Schinia tuberculum, the golden aster flower moth, is a major pollinator of P. falcata. Elsewhere in its range, this moth relies on other species of Pityopsis, such as P. graminifolia, as a food source.

== Conservation Status ==
P. falcata is listed as critically imperiled (S1) in Connecticut, imperiled (S2) in Rhode Island, vulnerable (S3) in New Jersey and New York, and vulnerable to apparently secure (S3S4) in Massachusetts.

Specific threats to the species are not well documented, though like other coastal endemics, P. falcata is potentially threatened by development, increased pressure from human recreation, sea level rise, coastal erosion, and invasive species. The overall impact of these threats, however, may be negligible due to the species' high local abundance and apparent tolerance of moderate disturbance, having been observed colonizing cleared habitats near roads and utility corridors.
