= Mission Dam =

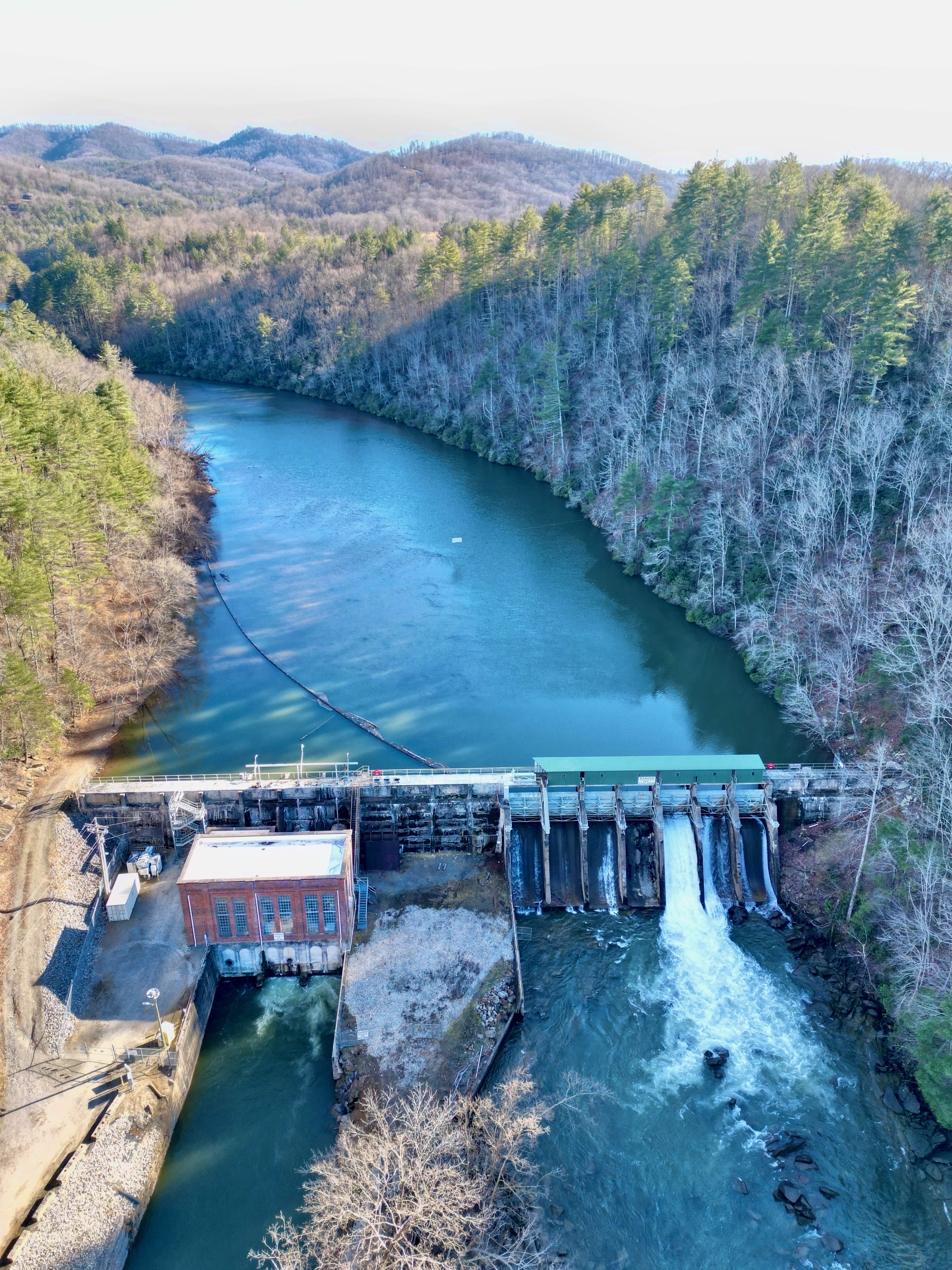
- Mission Dam on the Hiwassee River in Clay County, N.C.
- Interactive map of Mission Dam
- Official name: Mission Dam
- Location: Clay County, North Carolina, U.S.
- Coordinates: 35°3′52″N 83°55′33″W
- Opening date: 1924
- Construction cost: $500,000
- Operator: Duke Energy

Dam and spillways
- Impounds: Hiwassee River
- Height: 50 ft (15 m)
- Length: 397 ft (121 m)

Mission Dam is a dam on the Hiwassee River in Clay County, in the U.S. state of North Carolina. The dam is located between Hiwassee Dam and Chatuge Dam. The city of Andrews, North Carolina built the dam in 1924 at a cost of $500,000 to supply energy. The dam is the oldest on the river (other dams along the Hiwassee were constructed in the 1940s). Nantahala Power and Light bought the facility in 1929 and upgraded it in 1943. Unlike other dams on the river, it is operated by Duke Energy instead of the Tennessee Valley Authority. In 2018 the dam was purchased by Northbrook Power Management

Mission Dam was built as an Ambursen type dam, but in 1999 many of its chambers were filled in due to concrete deterioration. It is 50 feet (15 m) high and 397 feet (121 m) long. Mission Dam is classified by the U.S. Army Corps of Engineers as a high-hazard dam, meaning a dam failure may pose a deadly threat to nearby residents. As of 2023, the dam's condition was listed as "fair."

The reservoir is 47 acres. The dam is adjacent to a portage for canoe access downstream and a hiking trail on the path of the former Peavine Railroad which ran nearby.

== Location ==
Mission Dam is located 106 miles (170 km) above the mouth of the Hiwassee River, just upstream of the Cherokee County line.

The town of Hayesville, North Carolina and TVA's Chatuge Dam are located 9 miles and 15 miles upstream, respectively.
