= Ocoee River State Park =

State park in Tennessee

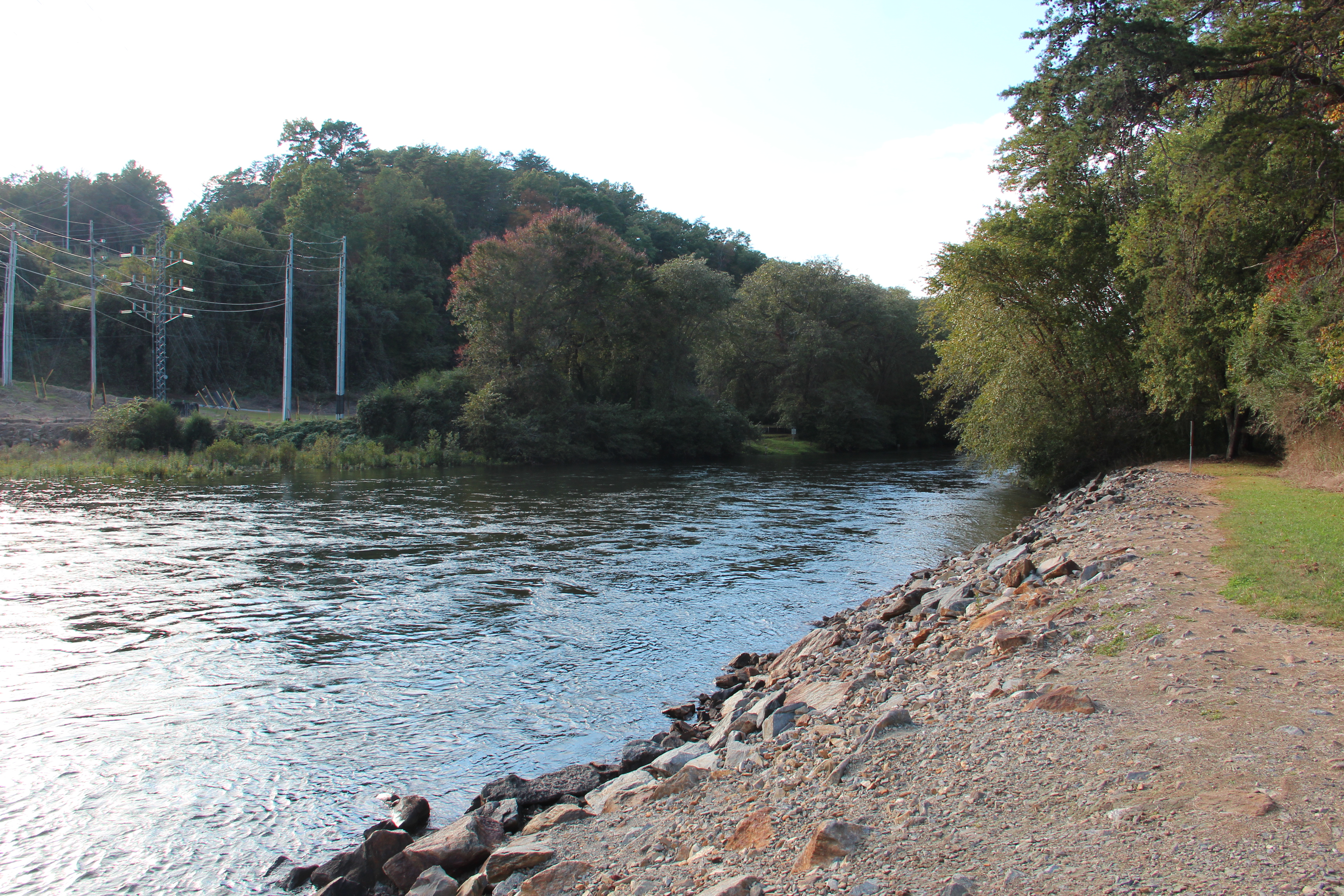
- The river seen near the Blue Ridge Dam
- Length: 17 mi (27 km)
- Established: September 20, 2025

Ocoee River State Park is a state park located in Tennessee, covering portions of the Ocoee River. The state park was founded on September 20, 2025. It is home to a rare plant, the Ruth's golden aster.

== History ==
The park was originally part of the Hiwassee/Ocoee Scenic River State Park, and was established as its own park in 2025.
