= Hiwassee, North Carolina =

Hiwassee
- Village
- Interactive map of Hiwassee
- Coordinates: 35°08′56″N 84°10′17″W
- Country: United States
- State: North Carolina
- County: Cherokee County, North Carolina

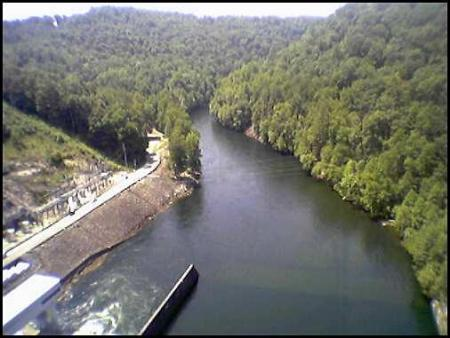
Picture from atop the Hiwassee dam in North Carolina.

Hiwassee is a small village in Cherokee County, North Carolina, United States, which sits next to the Hiwassee Dam and the artificially created Hiwassee Reservoir, on Hiwassee River.

== History ==
Hiwassee Dam had its own post office from 1937 until 1958.

The desire to open a library at the dam's construction site led to the creation of North Carolina's oldest regional library. Nantahala Regional Library was founded May 1, 1937. The village's branch closed in an unknown year but other library locations remain.

Hiwassee Dam High School, the westernmost public school in the state, opened in fall 1939. Four schools (Reid Chapel, Hill, Postell, and Shearer) were consolidated to create HDHS. Three others (Clark, Friendship, and Violet) consolidated with HDHS in the 1940s and 50s. HDHS moved into a new building in 1956.

The Hiwassee Dam Fire Department started in 1974. A station was constructed around the late 1980s. New stations were built in 1992, 2012, and 2021. The Hiwassee Dam Community Center was built in 1976. The Cherokee County Sheriff's Office opened a substation in Hiwassee Dam in September 2024. In 2023, the county planned to build a $1.6 million park with walking trails and a playground near the Hiwassee Dam schools campus, but the project was put on hold in 2024 due to limited local funding. In 2026, Hiwassee Dam resident Maverick Hawley was one of 120 student-athletes from across the nation to participate in the Patriot Games.

== Hiwassee Dam ==
The dam itself was constructed between 1936 and 1940 by the Tennessee Valley Authority as part of Roosevelt's New Deal policy. Hiwassee Dam is still maintained by the TVA. It has a height of 307 feet (94 m), spans a distance of 1,376 feet (419 m) feet across the Hiwassee River, and produces 185,000 kilowatts of electricity.

Hiwassee Dam was the world's tallest "overflow" dam until the completion of the Aswan High Dam on the Nile River in Egypt in the early 1970s. The depth from the top of the spillgates to the bedrock at the face of the dam is 285 feet.

== Hiwassee Reservoir ==
The reservoir serves recreational, power generation and flood control purposes. It is surrounded by the Nantahala and Cherokee National Forests and is almost adjacent to the Appalachia Reservoir. Both reservoirs are important for local wildlife such as deer. The reservoir is relatively shallow with an average depth of 142 feet (43 m) and can exceed depths of 200 feet (61 m) in places.
