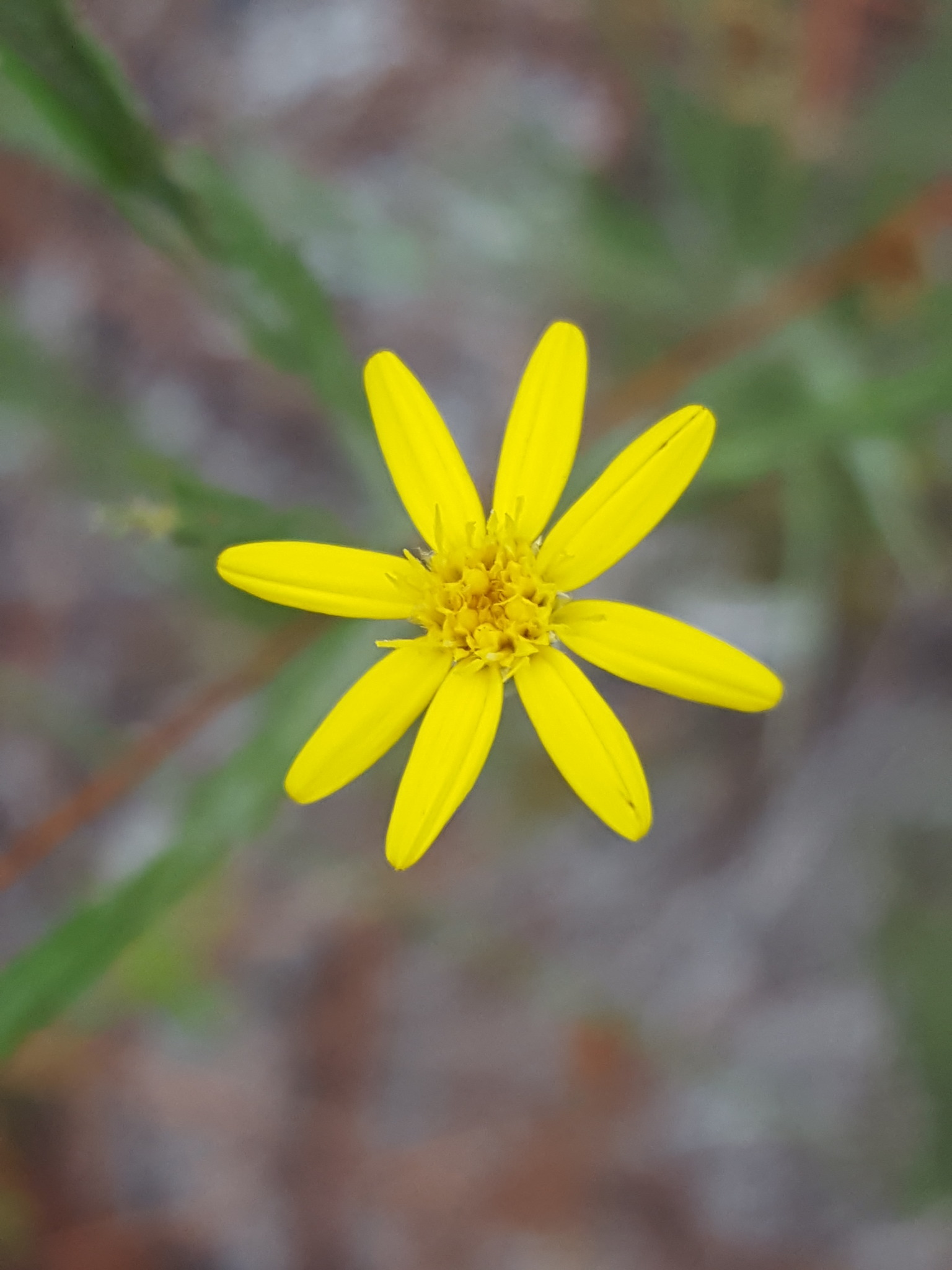

Scientific classification
- Kingdom: Plantae
- Clade: Tracheophytes
- Clade: Angiosperms
- Clade: Eudicots
- Clade: Asterids
- Order: Asterales
- Family: Asteraceae
- Genus: Pityopsis
- Species: P. microcephala

Binomial name
- Pityopsis microcephala Small

= Pityopsis microcephala =

Species of plant

Pityopsis microcephala is a species of flowering plant in the family Asteraceae. The species inhabits both the Atlantic and Gulf coastal plains from southeastern North Carolina to the eastern bank of the Mississippi River, in Louisiana. It typically inhabits drier open habitats such as pine savannas, sandhills, and dry woodlands; but it can also be found in flatwoods (which are generally wetter and have a longer hydroperiod).
