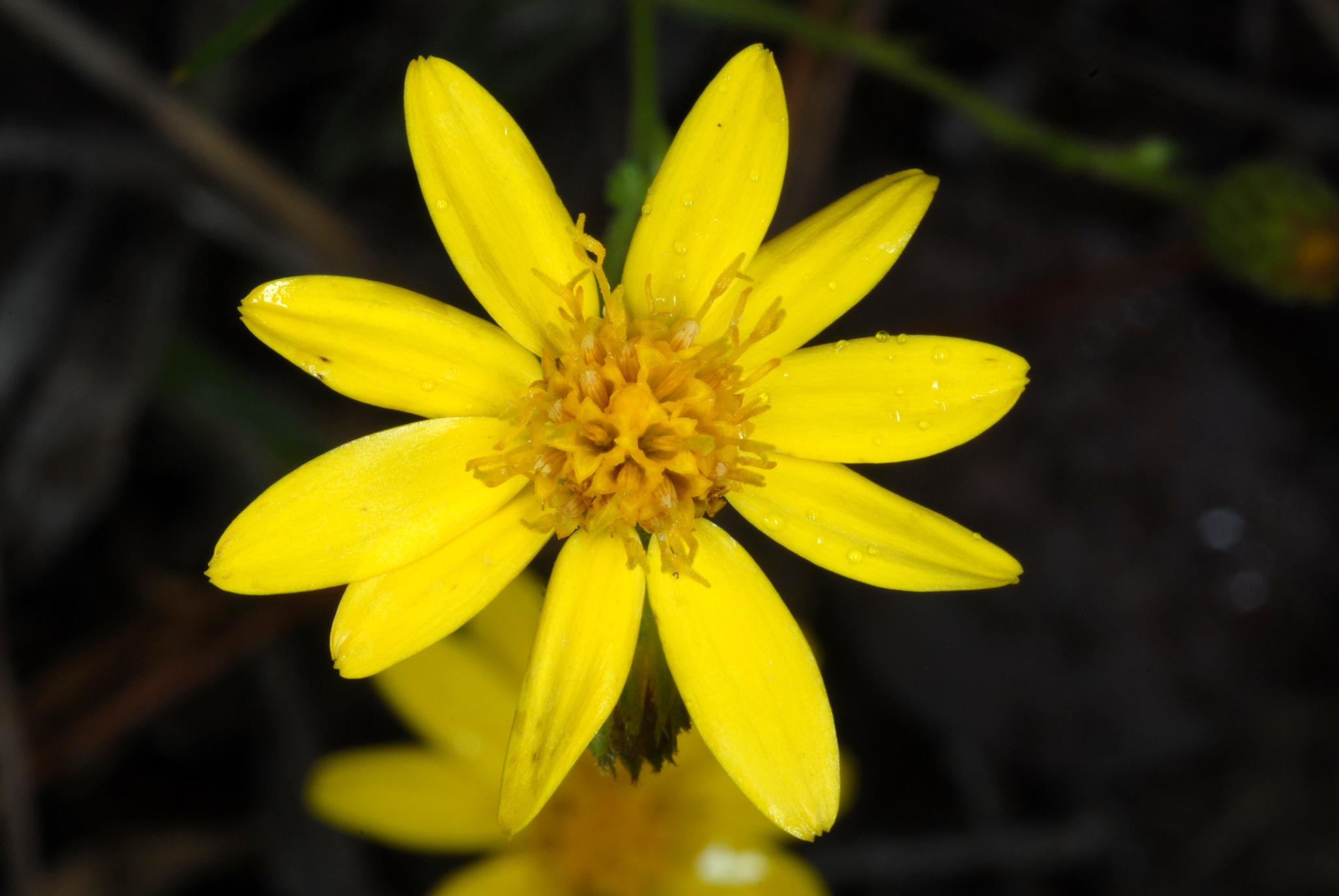
- Pityopsis aspera var. adenolepis

Scientific classification
- Kingdom: Plantae
- Clade: Tracheophytes
- Clade: Angiosperms
- Clade: Eudicots
- Clade: Asterids
- Order: Asterales
- Family: Asteraceae
- Genus: Pityopsis
- Species: P. aspera

Binomial name
- Pityopsis aspera (A.Gray) Small

= Pityopsis aspera =

Speceis of flowering plant

Pityopsis aspera, commonly known as pineland silkgrass or grass-leaved goldenaster, is a member of the Aster family endemic to the southeastern region of the United States. There exist multiple varieties, including: P. aspera var. adenolepsis, P. aspera var. aspera, and Heterotheca adenolepsis.

== Description ==
Pityopsis aspera ranges in height between 20 and 50 cm (8 and 20 in), and commonly possesses a singular erect stem. Leaves are linear-oblanceolate and range in length between 5 and 25 cm (2 and 10 in).

When in bloom, from August through October, the flowers produced possess 6 to 10 yellow petals.

== Distribution and habitat ==
Within the United States, P. aspera's native range stretches from Virginia to Florida and as far west as Mississippi.

Pityopsis aspera can be found in habitats such as dry woodlands, forests, longleaf pine sandhills, and disturbed environments.

== Ecology ==
Pityopsis aspera is insect pollinated and is recorded to have been visited in northern Florida by Agapostemon splendens, Augochlorella aurata, Augochloropsis sumptuosa, Ceratina, Coelioxys mexicanus, Halictus poeyi/ligatus, Heriades variolosa/leavitti, Lasioglossum apopkense, Lasioglossum illinoense, Lasioglossum longifrons, Lasioglossum reticulatum, Lasioglossum weemsi/leviense, Megachile mendica, Megachile petulans, Megachile pseudobrevis, Megachile texana, Melissodes boltoniae, Melissodes dentiventris, Paranthidium jugatorium, Perdita bishoppi, and Pseudopanurgus labrosiformis.
