= Nantahala Regional Library =

Library system in western North Carolina

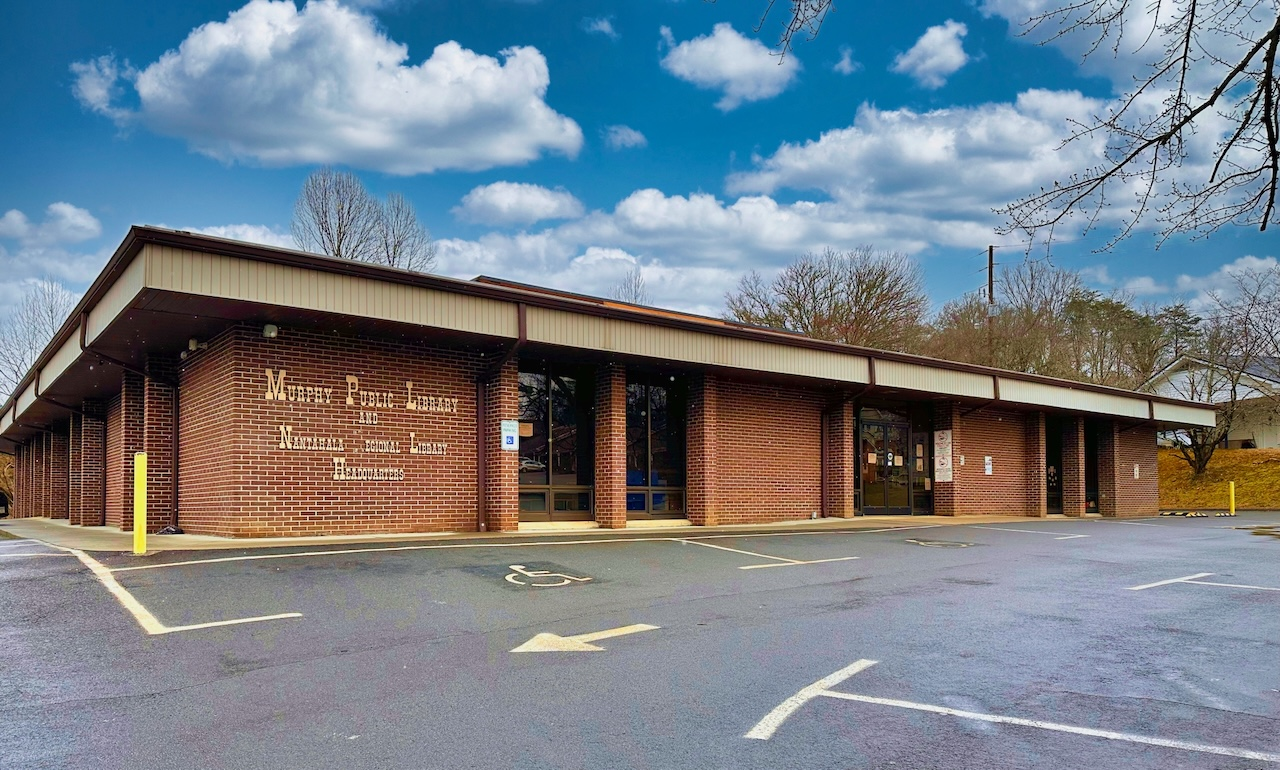
- Nantahala Regional Library headquarters in Murphy, N.C.
- 35°5′11.98″N 84°1′54.27″W
- Location: Cherokee County, North Carolina
- Type: Public library
- Established: 1937
- Branches: 4

Collection
- Size: 100,000 items

Other information
- Director: Franklin Shook
- Website: nrlibrary.org

Nantahala Regional Library is the oldest regional library in North Carolina and one of the first regional libraries formed in the United States. Its headquarters is in Murphy, North Carolina. The library has branches in Cherokee, Clay, and Graham counties.

The board of directors consists of nine members (three from each county) serving six-year terms. The library is funded by local governments. In fiscal year 2023-24, the library received approximately $463,000 in county funding, $367,000 in state funding, and $303,000 in municipal funding.

== History ==
The Nantahala Regional Library was founded May 1, 1937, when the Murphy Library Board entered into a contract with the Tennessee Valley Authority to provide library services at the construction site of Hiwassee Dam. The first regional librarian was hired at that time. The NRL started operation in the Carnegie library building in downtown Murphy.

As the dam project neared completion, citizens voted to provide library support through local taxes. On November 14, 1940, libraries in nearby Hayesville, Andrews, and Robbinsville joined the regional library system. The system has also offered a bookmobile since its inception. The branches in Hiwassee Dam and Fontana have since closed.

When the NRL outgrew Murphy's Carnegie library, it moved to space in the Murphy school until that building burned down. NRL offices then moved to the basement of the Carnegie library until the building partially collapsed during nearby excavation work. The NRL then returned to a school campus space until returning to the Carnegie building in November 1963.

In 1967, Clay County's library moved into a new building on Sanderson Street downtown after a large donation from the Fred A. Moss family. The library was renamed Moss Memorial Library and the facility has been expanded and renovated multiple times since its construction.

On May 16, 1976, the NRL moved to its current headquarters in a shared building when the present Murphy Public Library opened downtown. The building was designed by architect Eric Townson and cost approximately $467,600. In September 2001 the building was renovated and NRL offices moved upstairs.

In 2022, the Nantahala Regional Library joined the N.C. Cardinal system, which allows all public libraries in the state to share materials with each other when requested by patrons. That boosted the system's access from 100,000 physical items to 7.8 million.

Andrews' library building is owned by the town of Andrews. As of 2025, the town paid $20,000 annually for the building's maintenance and utilities, plus $80,000 annually to Nantahala Regional Library to staff and stock the facility.

== Directors ==
1. Ida Belle Entrekin (1941–1945)
2. Sarah H. Lloyd (1945–1949)
3. Phyllis Snyder (1950–1959)
4. Eleanor Brown (1959)
5. Alice Porter (1959–1962)
6. Martha Palmer (1962–1996)
7. Marcia Clontz (1996–2008)
8. Daphne Childres (2008-????)
9. Franklin Shook (2019–present)
