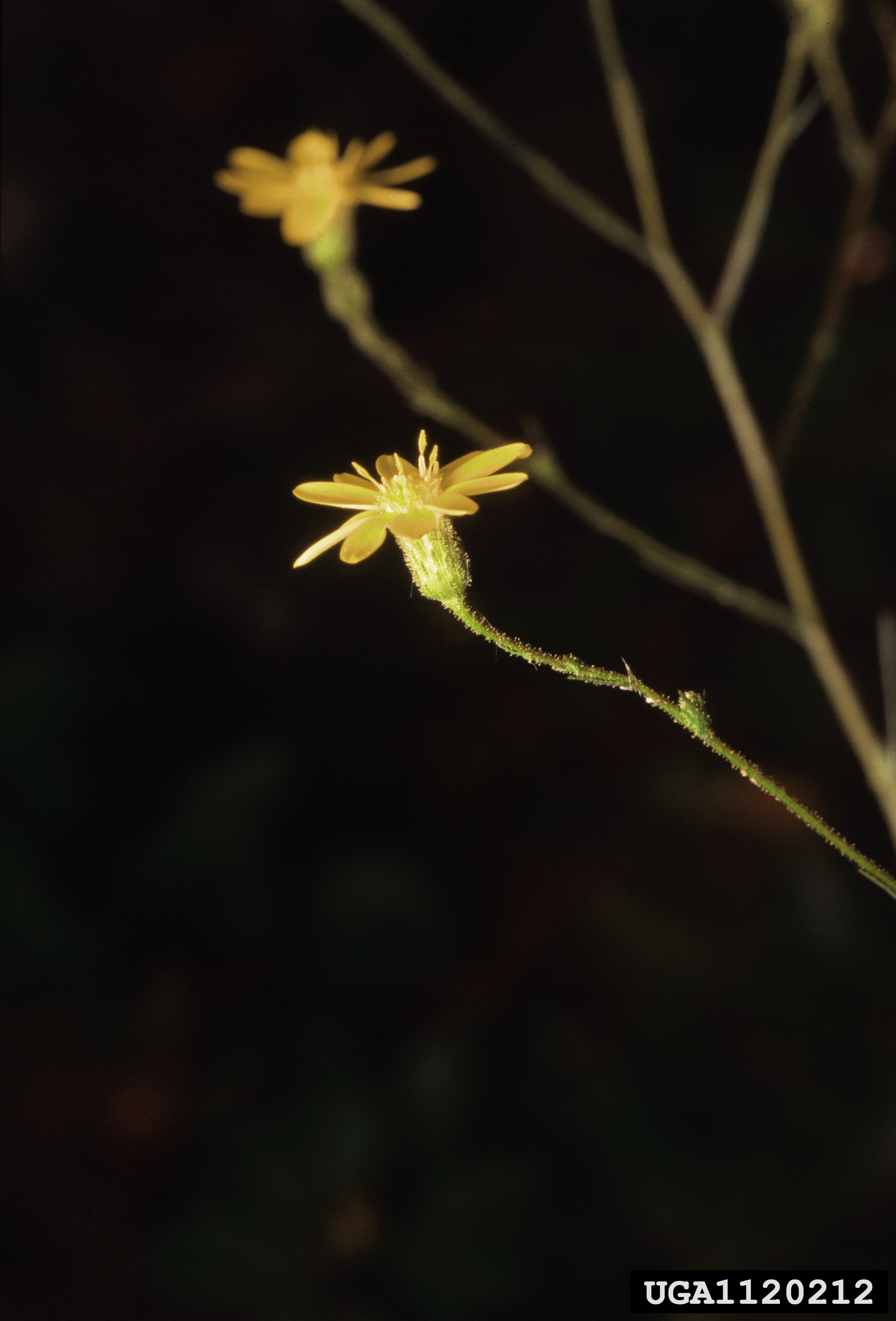

Conservation status
- Secure (NatureServe)

Scientific classification
- Kingdom: Plantae
- Clade: Tracheophytes
- Clade: Angiosperms
- Clade: Eudicots
- Clade: Asterids
- Order: Asterales
- Family: Asteraceae
- Genus: Pityopsis
- Species: P. graminifolia

Binomial name
- Pityopsis graminifolia (Michx.) Nutt.

Synonyms
- Chrysopsis graminifolia Elliot; Heterotheca graminifolia (Michx.) Shinners

= Pityopsis graminifolia =

Species of plant

Pityopsis graminifolia, or narrowleaf silkgrass, is a fibrous-rooted flowering perennial named for the silvery hairs that cover its stems and give a silky appearance. Pityopsis graminifolia flower heads have characteristic ray and disk florets, and the linear-lance-shaped leaves of the plant often appear grasslike. It is part of the Asteraceae family, also known as the daisy or sunflower family.

Pityopsis graminifolia is commonly found in the southeastern United States as well as some parts of Central America. Because Pityopsis graminifolia is drought resilient and can grow in nutrient-deficient soil, it flourishes in many different environments, including coastal sandhills, forests, longleaf pine ecosystems, and roadsides.

== Description ==
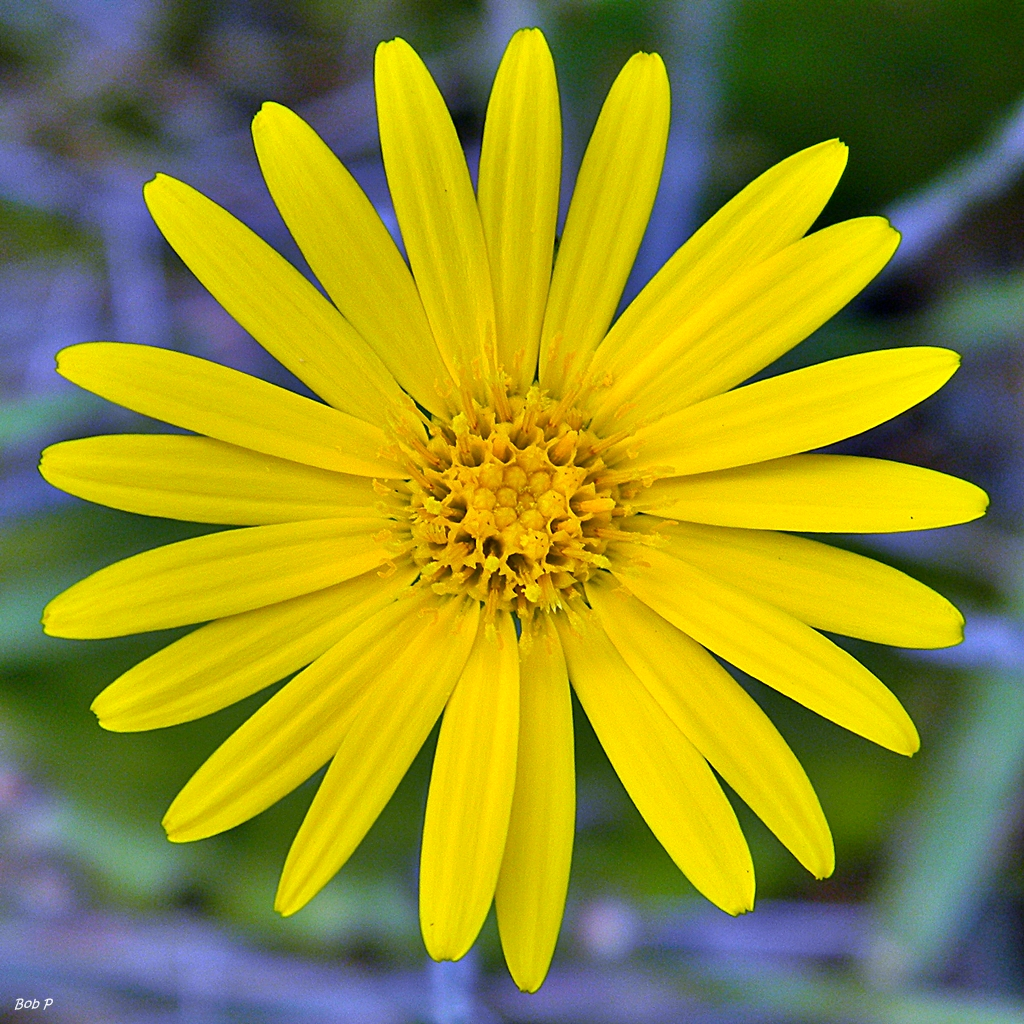
Narrowleaf silkgrass (Pityopsis graminifolia)

Pityopsis graminifolia is also known as narrowleaf silkgrass, Silver-leaved aster, Grass-leaved goldenaster and Silky golden-aster. Many of its common names reference grass because the plant can be mistaken for grass. Its leaves are often basal and range in length from 10 to 35 cm (3.9 to 13.8 in) and reach between 3 and 10 millimeters wide. Each plant has 1-5 stems that reach around 20–80 cm in length, covered in short, alternating stem leaves. The characteristic trait of narrowleaf silkgrass, and the reason for the term ‘silky’ in its common names is the silvery hairs that cover the plant stems. Pityopsis graminifolia has yellow composite flower heads, which are about 2.5 cm wide, with both ray and disk florets. These flowers turn into pappi—another common feature of the Asteraceae family— which are small dry fruits that contain the matured ovary in the form of a seed, with hair-like structures on the top that act as a parachute to disperse the seed with the wind. These pappus have two series. The inner series has barbed bristles ranging from 5-9mm and the outer series has shorter 0.4-0.9mm bristles.

== Reproduction ==
=== Sexual reproduction ===
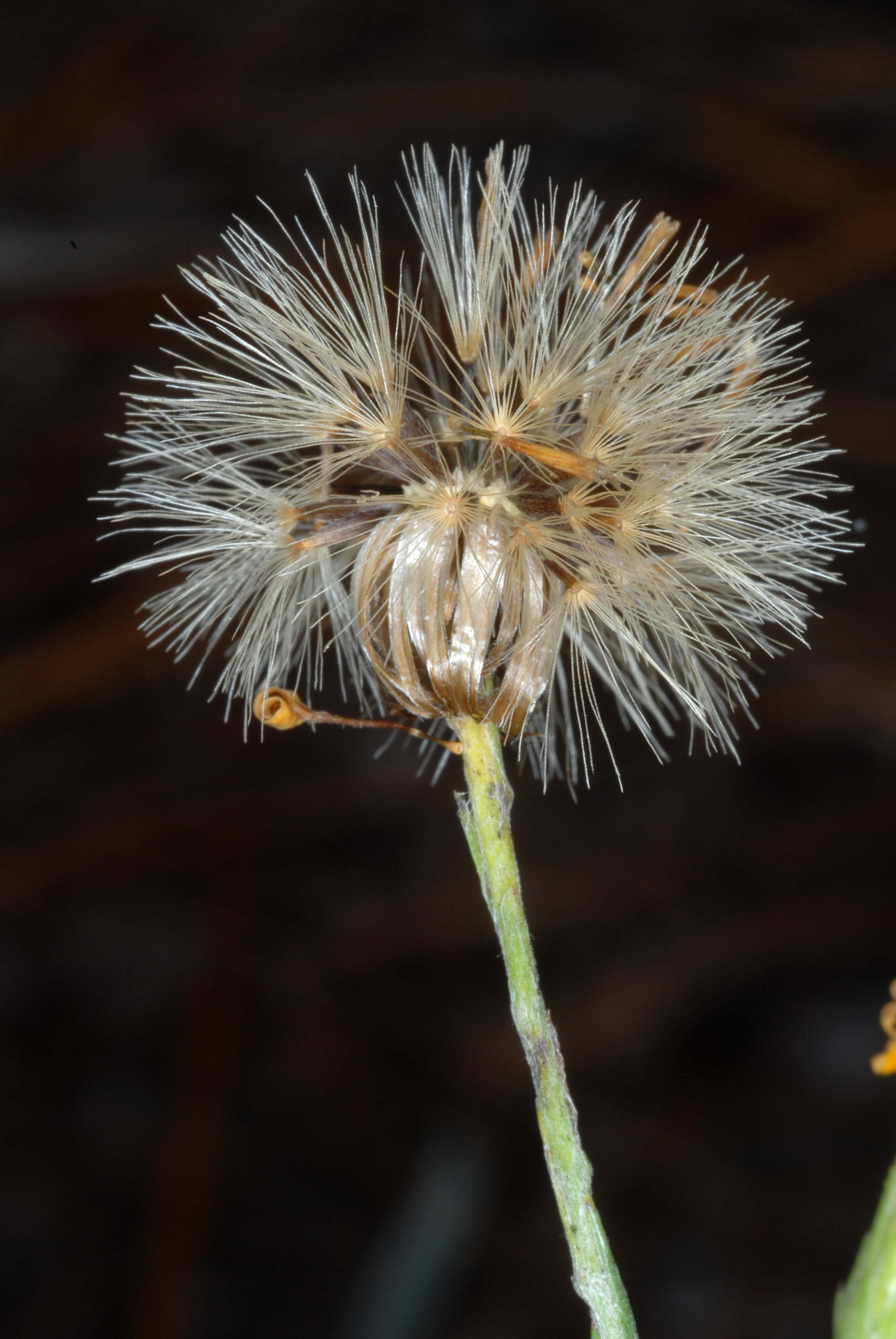
P. graminifolia pappus

Pityopsis graminifolia, a part of the Asteracea family which includes sunflowers, asters, daisies, and marigolds, has ray and disk florets in each flower head. The disk florets are perfect and the ray florets are pistillate. The disk flowers are protandrous, meaning that the florets release pollen before the female reproductive parts become receptive. This dichogamy, in addition to self-incompatibility strategies, make it difficult for Pityopsis graminifolia to self-pollinate, except through geitonogamy. On each capitulate flower there are on average 20-70 florets, with 10-16 ray florets and 30-40 disk florets. Flowering times vary greatly based on subspecies and location, but the plant often flowers between late summer to early winter. Pityopsis graminifolia is pollinated by bumblebees and lepidopterans. Pityopsis graminifolia produces wind-dispersed achenes fruit that are fusiform with translucent, thin ridges running along the sides of the fruit.

=== Cloning ===
Although Pityopsis graminifolia is capable of sexual reproduction through outcrossing, much of its population upkeep comes through cloning through rhizomes to create individual ramet plants. The rhizomes run underneath the soil, with new plants branching off at axillary buds to grow above the surface to form new plants. In fact, Hartnett (1987) documented that an experimental study site population was entirely maintained through cloning over a two year period. During that time, no seedlings were successfully established.

=== Fire-enhanced flowering ===
Pityopsis graminifolia’s reproduction is oftentimes closely linked to growing-season fires, especially in longleaf pine forests. These fires are often the result of lightning strikes. Pityopsis graminifolia has the ability to survive forest fires because their apical shoots lie 2–3 cm below the soil, which provides a protective layer against the fire’s heat. In addition to a protective soil layer, Diaz-Toribio (2021) discusses how nonstructural carbohydrate stores in plants, which Pityopsis graminifolia has a large concentration of in comparison to other species in longleaf pine forests, promote resprouting after a fire. Because this plant can survive fires, its fire-enhanced floral induction is an adaptive trait to help it better compete against other species. Normal seedlings do not compete well against adult plants and have a successful establishment rate of 1-3%. By waiting until immediately following a fire, Pityopsis graminifolia can capitalize on the lack of underbrush and the increase in sunlight from canopy removal to release seeds that have a higher chance of survival. This decreases the energy cost of reproduction when seedling mortality would be high.

== Habitat ==
Pityopsis graminifolia grows best in sandy ecosystems with full sunlight and limited canopy competition. It often chases full sun by growing in sandhill communities, roadsides, or the edges of woods, areas that might not be ideal for other plants because of nutrient poor soil but that Pityopsis graminifolia can grow well in. Pityopsis graminifolia is also drought tolerant. Pityopsis graminifolia is commonly a dominant species in longleaf pine communities because the frequent fires limit the growth of woody plants, which would normally block most of the sunlight by creating dense canopies. It can grow in the piedmont and mountains, but these habitats are not ideal because it grows best in soil with little to no humus. This species occasionally is used for ornamental landscaping.

== Distribution ==
Pityopsis graminifolia is most commonly found in the southeastern United States, especially Florida. However, this plant is not limited to the southeastern United States. It reaches as far north as Ohio and as far west as Texas. Although less common, detached populations can also be found in Central America, the Bahamas, and the Caribbean, even as far as northern Honduras.

=== Distribution of ploidy levels ===
The chromosome count of Pityopsis graminifolia has been a topic of interest to researchers because of the range of ploidy levels. The plant can range from having diploid, tetraploid, or hexaploid chromosomes. Diploid plants are found in the majority of populations. The known tetraploids are all a part of the subspecies latifolia. The latifolia subspecies is found throughout the Pityopsis graminifolia distribution, but tetraploid latifolia have only been found east of the Mississippi. In the northern reaches of the species, specifically Alabama, Tennessee, North Carolina and Virginia, tetraploid populations are the most common, although some hexaploids have been found in Alabama. Florida is unique because diploid, tetraploid, and hexaploid Pityopsis graminifolia have all been collected there. Although Pityopsis graminifolia is known to grow in Central America, there is no evidence of the chromosome numbers of the known populations.

== Taxonomy ==
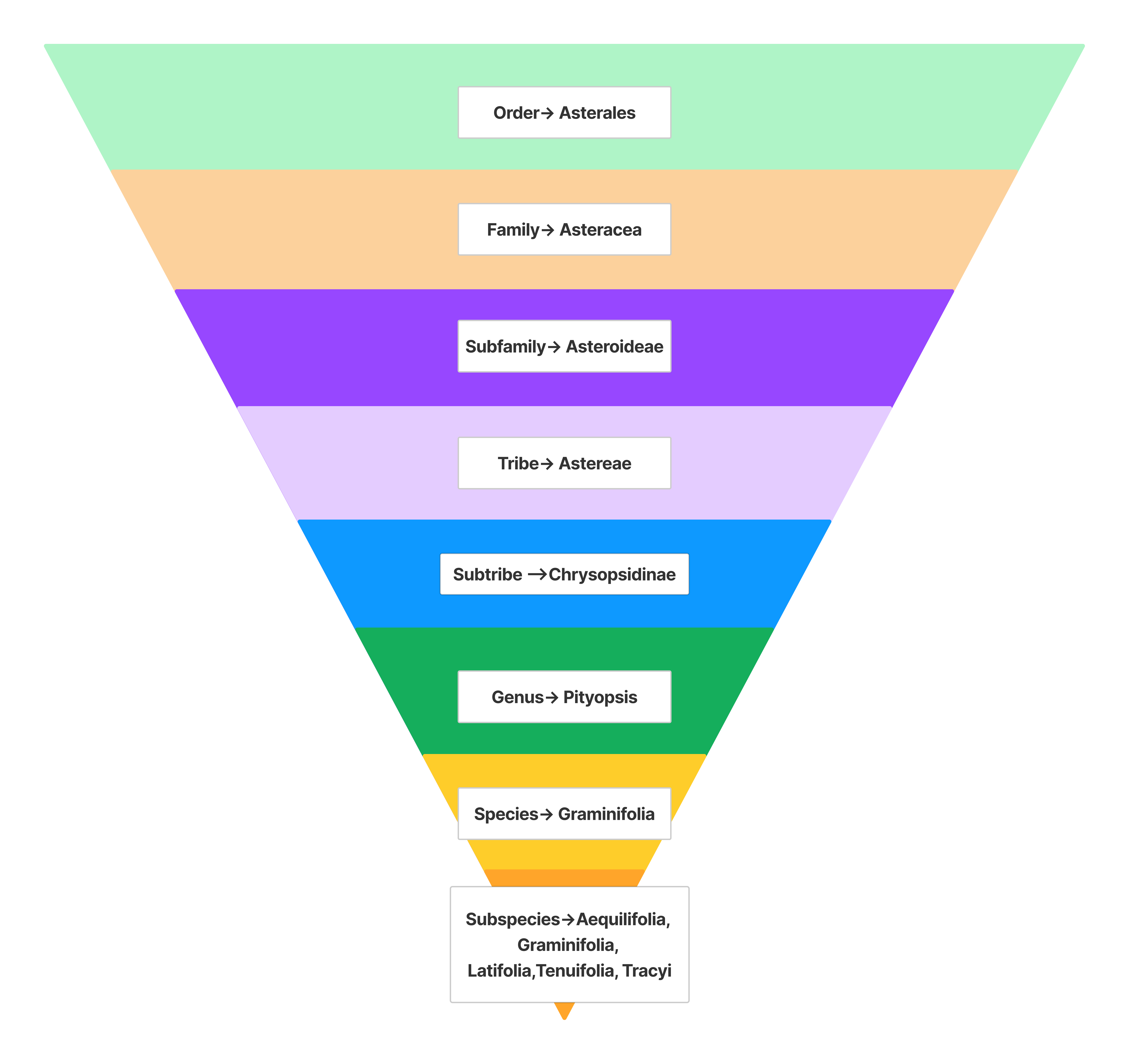
Taxonomy of Pityopsis graminifolia

=== Taxonomy overview ===
Pityopsis graminifolia is notorious for its complex taxonomy. Researchers have spent decades arguing the best way to classify the subtribe Chrysopsidinae and the genus Pityopsis. Some researchers, including Shinners (1951) and Harms (1965) wanted to combine the genera Chrysopsis and Heterotheca. Semple and Bowers (1985) separated the subtribe Chrysopsidinae into three separate genera: Chrysopsis, Heterotheca, and Pityopsis, further classifying Pityopsis into species and subspecies. Some differences in the different genus of the subtribe include fruit morphology, leaf anatomy, root and rhizome distinctions, habitat, and distribution.

=== The Genus Pityopsis ===
The genus Pityopsis is split into two sections, Pityopsis section Pityopsis, and Pityopsis section Graminifoliae. P. sect. Pityopsis has four species and P. sect. Graminifoliae has three. The two genus sections are based on stem leaf and rosette trait differences. P. sect. Pityopsis, at the time of flowering, does not have basal rosette leaves, but P. sect. Graminifoliae does. All species in P. sect. Graminifoliae have fire-dependent flowering, but Pityopsis flexuosa and Pityopsis pinifolia do as well. Pityopsis ruthii is listed under the Endangered Species Act by the United States Fish and Wildlife Service (USFWS) and only grows along The Hiwassee and Ocoee rivers in Polk County, Tennessee. P. ruthii's small geographic range may be due to its low genetic diversity and plasticity responses. Its location in an area with low burn rates and minimal undergrowth leads to minimal competition for the species, making it a poor competitor when compared to other species in the genus Pityopsis. Boggess (2013) reported that only 13,181 P. ruthii plants could still be found along the two rivers. Pityopsis falcata similarly grows in areas with low burn rates. It is also an endemic species. The classification of the genus Pityopsis can be seen below.

- P. sect. Pityopsis
  - Pityopsis pinifolia
  - Pityopsis falcata
  - Pityopsis flexuosa
  - Pityopsis ruthii
- P. sect. Graminifoliae
  - Pityopsis oligantha
  - Pityopsis aspera
    - var. Aspera, Adenolepis
  - Pityopsis graminifolia
    - var. Aequilifolia, Graminifolia, Latifolia, Tenuifolia, Tracyi

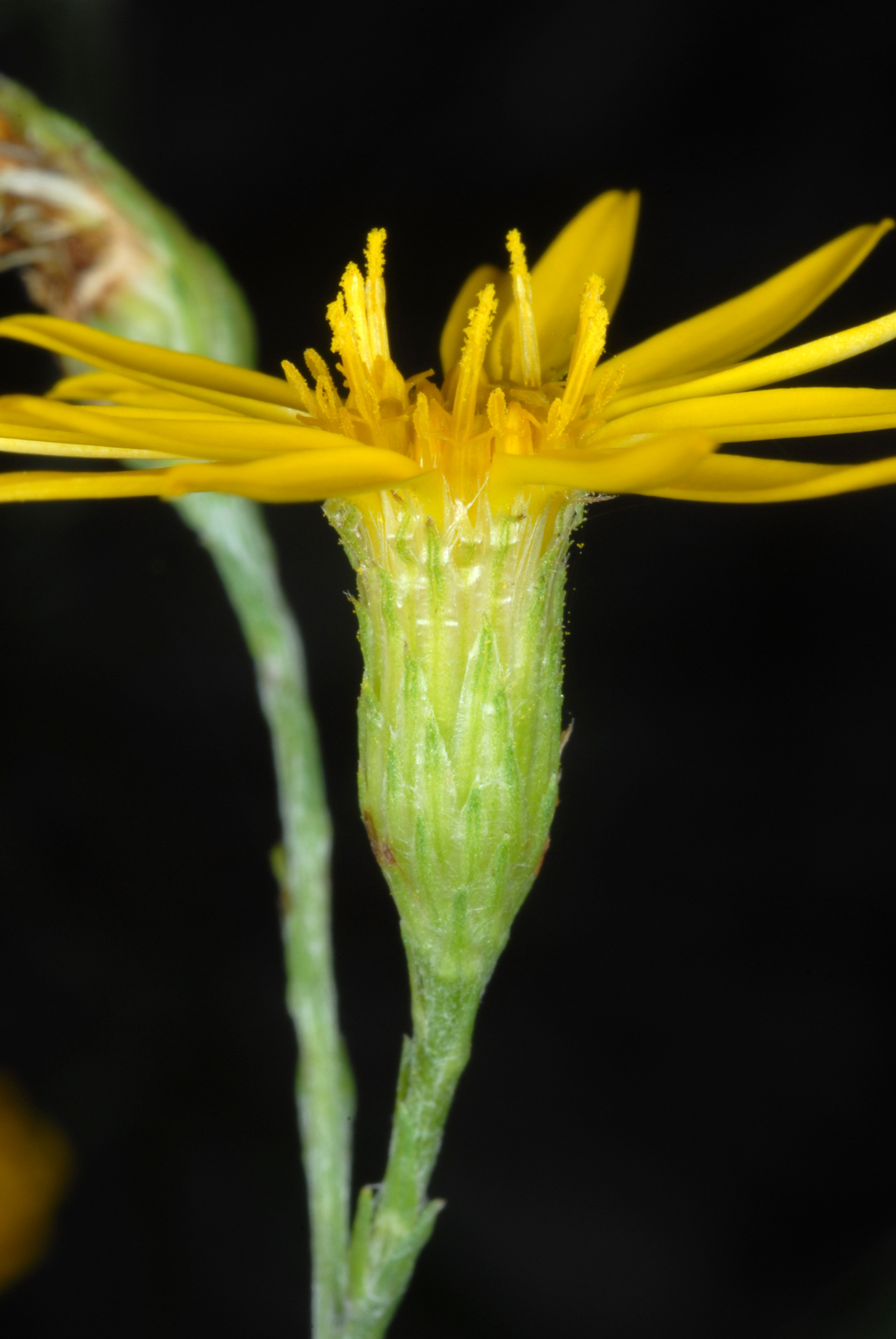
Base of a Pityopsis graminifolia flower

=== Pityopsis graminifolia ===
Pityopsis graminifolia can be differentiated from other species in its genus by certain features around the base of the flowers. The involucres, or leaf-like structures that surround the base of the flower, are larger than in some other species, ranging from 8–10 mm in length. The individual involucre leaves, called phyllaries, are linear-triangular for the outer phyllaries and oblong-lanceolate on the inner phyllaries. Pityopsis graminifolia can be further identified by the occasional glands on the apices of the inner involucres.

=== Subspecies ===
Pityopsis graminifolia is split into five subspecies based on several factors including distribution and habitat, morphology, chromosome ploidy, and phenology.

Pityopsis graminifolia var. Aequilifolia

- Distribution: Florida
- Habitat: sandy soils
- Ploidy: 2n = 18
- Phenology: Flowers in the late summer to the early fall
- Morphology: ray florets 7-10, disk florets 15-20

Pityopsis graminifolia var. Graminifolia

- Distribution: Louisiana, Mississippi, Alabama, Georgia, Florida, North and South Carolina
- Habitat: Coastal Plains
- Ploidy: 2n = 18
- Phenology: Flowers in the fall
- Morphology: ray florets 6-15, disk florets 16-29

Pityopsis graminifolia var. Latifolia

- Distribution: Alaska, Arkansas, Delaware, Florida, Georgia, Kentucky, Louisiana, Maryland, Mississippi, North Carolina, Ohio, South Carolina, Tennessee, Texas, Virginia, Mexico, West Indies (Bahamas), Central America (Belize, Guatemala, Honduras).
- Habitat: sandy soils, roadsides, and pine woods, specifically longleaf pine ecosystems
- Ploidy: 2n = 36
- Phenology: Flowers in the late fall to late winter
- Morphology: ray florets 10-16, disk florets 30-40

Pityopsis graminifolia var. Tenuifolia

- Distribution: Texas, Oklahoma, Arkansas, Louisiana, Alabama, Georgia, Florida, North and South Carolina
- Habitat: sandy soils, roadsides, oak and pine woods
- Ploidy: 2n = 18
- Phenology: Flowers in the early fall through the spring
- Morphology: ray florets 8-12, disk florets 15-28

Pityopsis graminifolia var. Tracyi

- Distribution: Florida
- Habitat: sandy soils, rocky soils, edges of pine woods
- Ploidy: 2n = 54
- Phenology: Flowers in the late fall through the winter
- Morphology: ray florets 13-25, disk florets 30-37

== Etymology ==
The binomial name Pityopsis graminifolia is a combination of Greek and Latin etymology. Pityopsis comes from the Greek nymph Pitys, which means pine. Greek mythology narrates that the god of livestock, Pan, chased Pitys, whose flight prompted the pity of the other Greek gods, and led them to turn her into a pine tree to protect her from Pan. Other versions of the myth also exist. Graminifolia has its roots in Latin. Gramen means grass, and folius means leaf.
