= Hanging Dog Creek =

Stream in North Carolina, USA

Hanging Dog Creek Tributary to Hiawassee River
- Location of Hanging Dog mouth Hanging Dog Creek (the United States)

Location
- Country: United States
- State: North Carolina
- County: Cherokee

Physical characteristics
- Source: Hyatt Creek divide
  - location: Hanging Dog Gap
  - coordinates: 35°12′48″N 083°58′03″W
  - elevation: 3,450 ft (1,050 m)
- Mouth: Hiawassee River
  - location: Hiawassee Lake
  - coordinates: 35°06′22″N 084°04′33″W
  - elevation: 1,525 ft (465 m)
- Length: 14.57 mi (23.45 km)
- Basin size: 40.94 square miles (106.0 km^{2})
- Discharge
  - location: Hiawassee River
  - average: 120.86 cu ft/s (3.422 m^{3}/s) at mouth with Hiawassee River

Basin features
- Progression: Hiawassee River → Tennessee River → Ohio River → Mississippi River → Gulf of Mexico
- River system: Hiawassee River
- Population: Swannanoa River → French Broad River →
- Tributaries
  - left: Will Creek; Augen Branch; Grindstone Branch; Davis Creek; Cook Creek; Dockery Creek
  - right: Bear Creek; Owl Creek; Bates Creek
- Bridges: Clearview Lane, Boiling Springs Road (x2), Woody Branch Road, Boiling Springs Road (x3), Running Deer Lane, Boiling Springs Road (x2), Hanging Dog Road, Tranquil Valley Lane, Ed Graves Road (x2), Ebenezer Road, McDonald Road, Haven Lane, Joe Brown Highway

Hanging Dog Creek is a stream in the U.S. state of North Carolina. It is a tributary to the Hiwassee River.

Some say the name Hanging Dog is a corruption of "Hanging Maw", a local Cherokee, while others believe the name stems from an incident when Indian's dog was "hung up" in river debris before being rescued.
