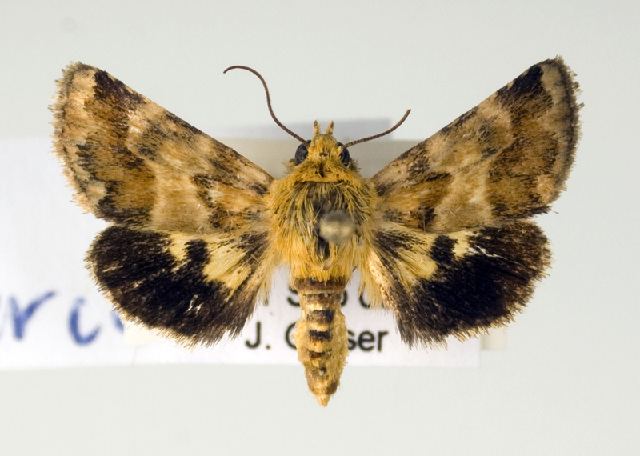

Scientific classification
- Kingdom: Animalia
- Phylum: Arthropoda
- Clade: Pancrustacea
- Class: Insecta
- Order: Lepidoptera
- Superfamily: Noctuoidea
- Family: Noctuidae
- Genus: Schinia
- Species: S. tuberculum

Binomial name
- Schinia tuberculum Hübner, 1827-31

= Schinia tuberculum =

Species of moth

Schinia tuberculum is a moth of the family Noctuidae. It is found from New York to Florida, west to Oklahoma and Texas.

Its wingspan is about 20 mm. Adults are on wing from August to October. There is one generation per year.

The larvae feed on Pityopsis graminifolia.
