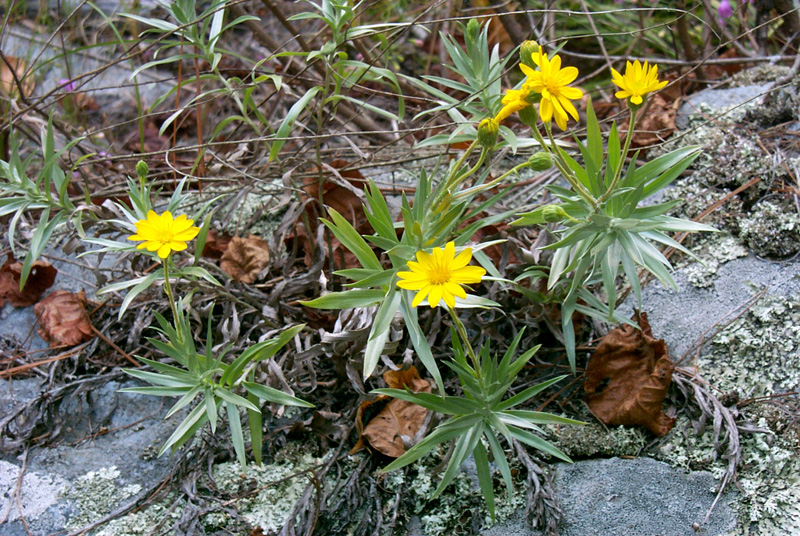
- Pityopsis ruthii

Scientific classification
- Kingdom: Plantae
- Clade: Tracheophytes
- Clade: Angiosperms
- Clade: Eudicots
- Clade: Asterids
- Order: Asterales
- Family: Asteraceae
- Subfamily: Asteroideae
- Tribe: Astereae
- Subtribe: Chrysopsidinae
- Genus: Pityopsis; Nutt.

Type species
- Pityopsis pinifolia (Elliott) Nutt.

Synonyms
- Heterotheca sect. Pityopsis (Nutt.) V.L.Harms; Chrysopsis ect. Pityopsis (Nutt.) Torr. & A.Gray

= Pityopsis =

Genus of plants

Pityopsis is a genus of North American plants in the tribe Astereae within the family Asteraceae. Species of Pityopsis are known by the common names silkgrass or golden asters or grass-leaved goldenasters .

Species

- Pityopsis aspera (Shuttlw. ex A.Gray) Small – Pineland silkgrass - LA MS AL GA FL SC NC VA TN
- Pityopsis falcata (Pursh) Nutt. – Sickleleaf silkgrass - ONT NY MA CT RI NJ FL
- Pityopsis flexuosa (Nash) Small – Zigzag silkgrass - FL
- Pityopsis graminifolia (Michx.) Nutt. – Narrowleaf silkgrass - Bahamas, Belize, Honduras, Chiapas, Oaxaca, Veracruz, Tamaulipas, United States (TX LA MS AL GA FL SC NC VA MD DE WV OH KY TN AR OK)
- Pityopsis microcephala (Small) Small - FL GA SC NC AL MS LA
- Pityopsis oligantha (Chapm. ex Torr. & A.Gray) Small – Grassleaf goldaster - USA (TX LA MS AL GA FL)
- Pityopsis pinifolia (Elliott) Nutt. – Taylor County goldaster - USA (AL GA SC NC)
- Pityopsis ruthii (Small) Small – Ruth's golden aster - TN
