= Apalachia Dam =

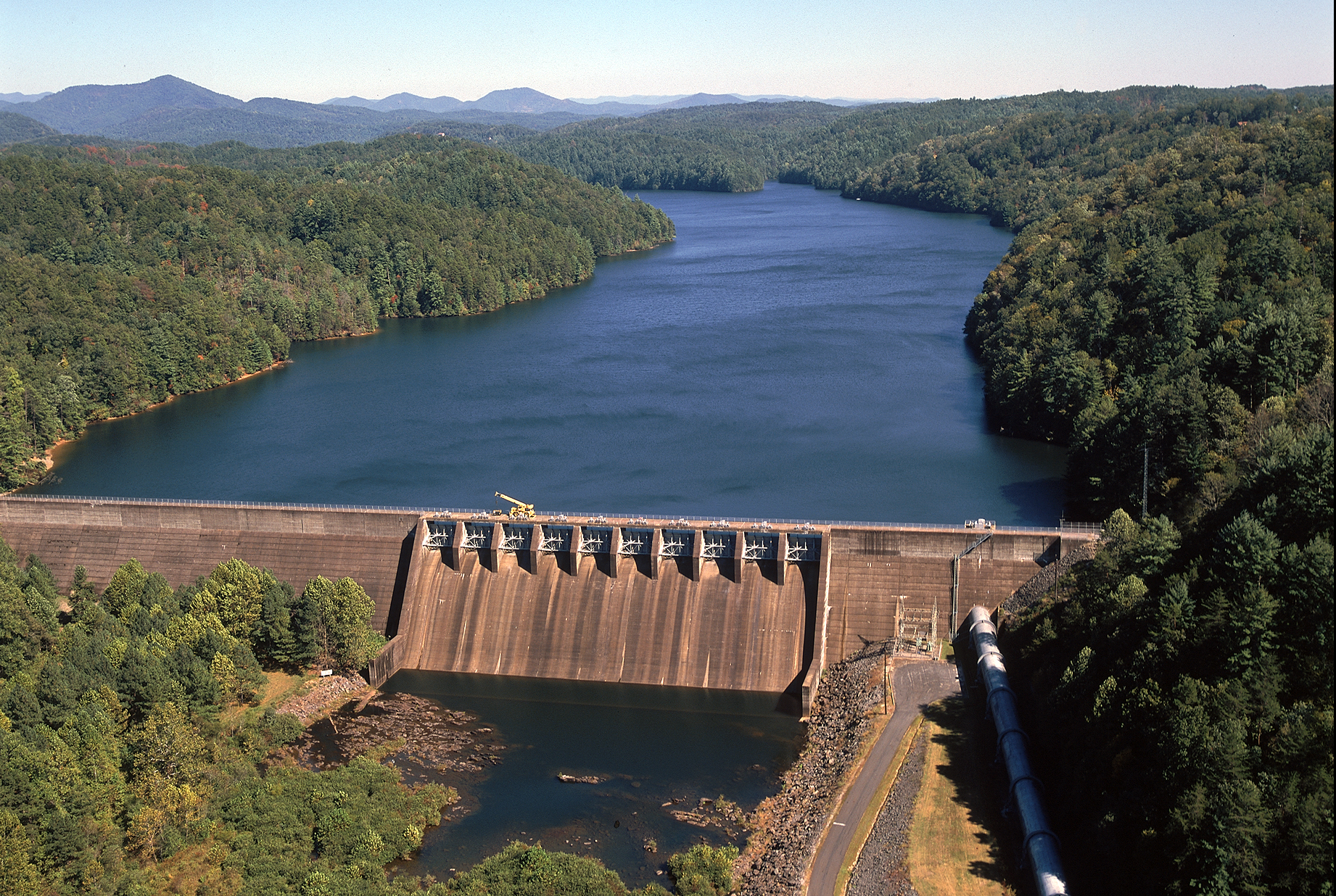
- Interactive map of Apalachia Dam
- Official name: Apalachia Dam
- Location: Cherokee County, North Carolina, United States
- Coordinates: 35°10′4″N 84°17′44″W
- Construction began: July 17, 1941
- Opening date: February 14, 1943
- Operator: Tennessee Valley Authority

Dam and spillways
- Impounds: Hiwassee River
- Height: 150 ft (46 m)
- Length: 1,308 ft (399 m)

Reservoir
- Creates: Apalachia Reservoir
- Total capacity: 57,800 acre⋅ft (71,300 dam^{3})
- Catchment area: 1,018 mi^{2} (2,640 km^{2})

Apalachia Dam is a hydroelectric dam on the Hiwassee River in Cherokee County, in the U.S. state of North Carolina. The dam is the lowermost of three dams on the river owned and operated by the Tennessee Valley Authority, which built the dam in the early 1940s to provide emergency power for aluminum production during World War II. While the dam is in North Carolina, an 8.3-mile (13.4 km) underground conduit carries water from the dam's reservoir to the powerhouse located 12 miles (19 km) downstream across the state line in Polk County, Tennessee. The dam and associated infrastructure were listed on the National Register of Historic Places in 2017. Apalachia Dam is classified by the U.S. Army Corps of Engineers as a high-hazard dam, meaning a dam failure may pose a deadly threat to nearby residents. The dam's condition is not made available to the public due to security concerns.

Apalachia Dam is named for the crossroads community of Old Apalachia, located near the dam site in North Carolina, and the community's L&N railroad stop, known simply as Apalachia, which was further downstream on the Tennessee side of the state line.

== Location ==
Apalachia Dam is located nearly 66 miles (106 km) upstream from the mouth of the Hiwassee River, where it joins the Tennessee River near Birchwood, Tennessee. The Hiwassee River rises in Northern Georgia, flows northwestward into Western North Carolina, then into Eastern Tennessee, before emptying into Chickamauga Lake, which is a reservoir of the Tennessee River created by the Chickamauga Dam in East Tennessee. The Apalachia dam is situated near the center of a scenic and relatively isolated valley sliced by the river as it winds its way through the southwestern fringe of the Blue Ridge Mountains. The Unicoi Mountains rise to the north of the dam, and the Nantahala National Forest surrounds the dam and its reservoir on all sides.

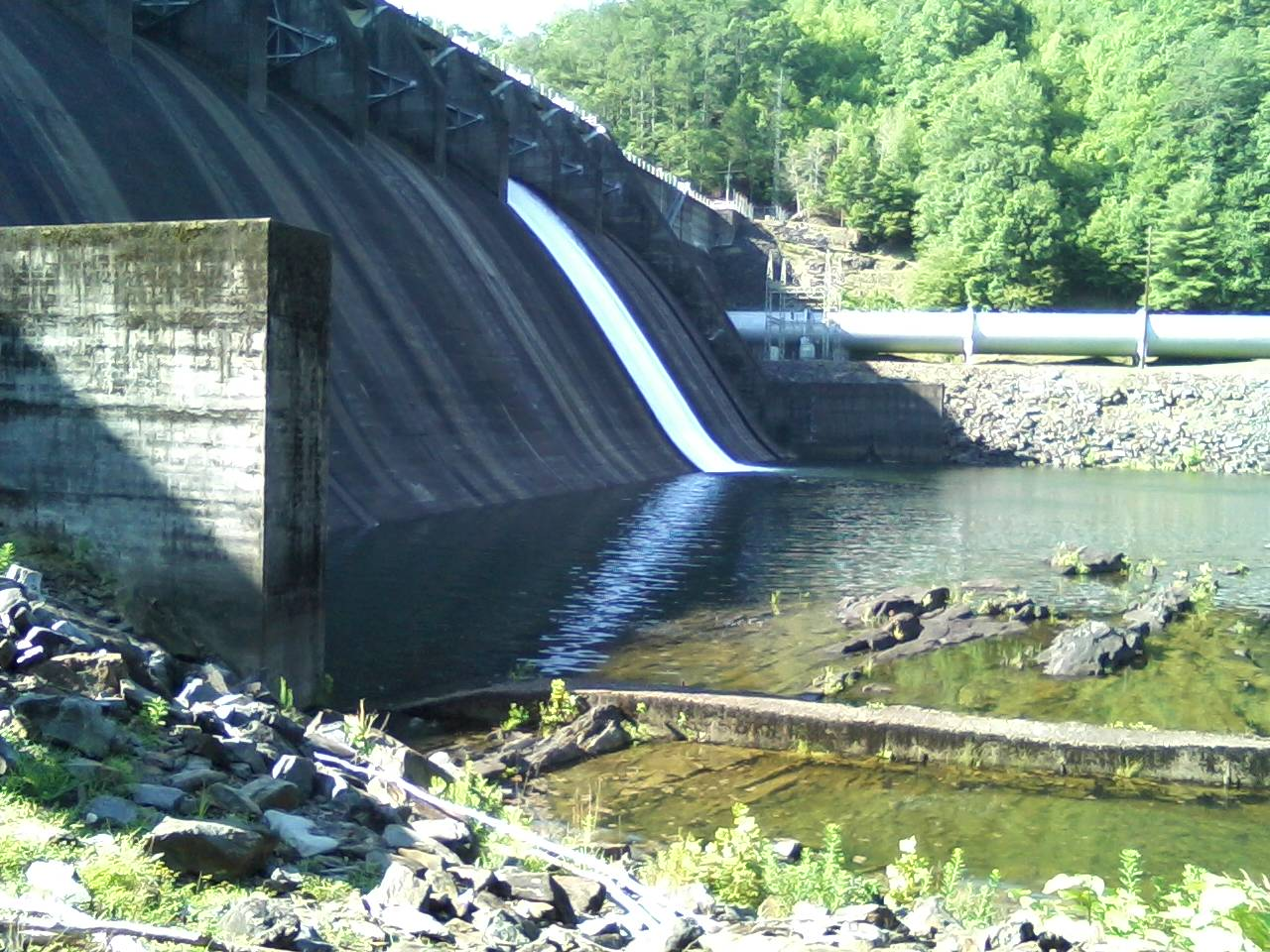
View from downstream

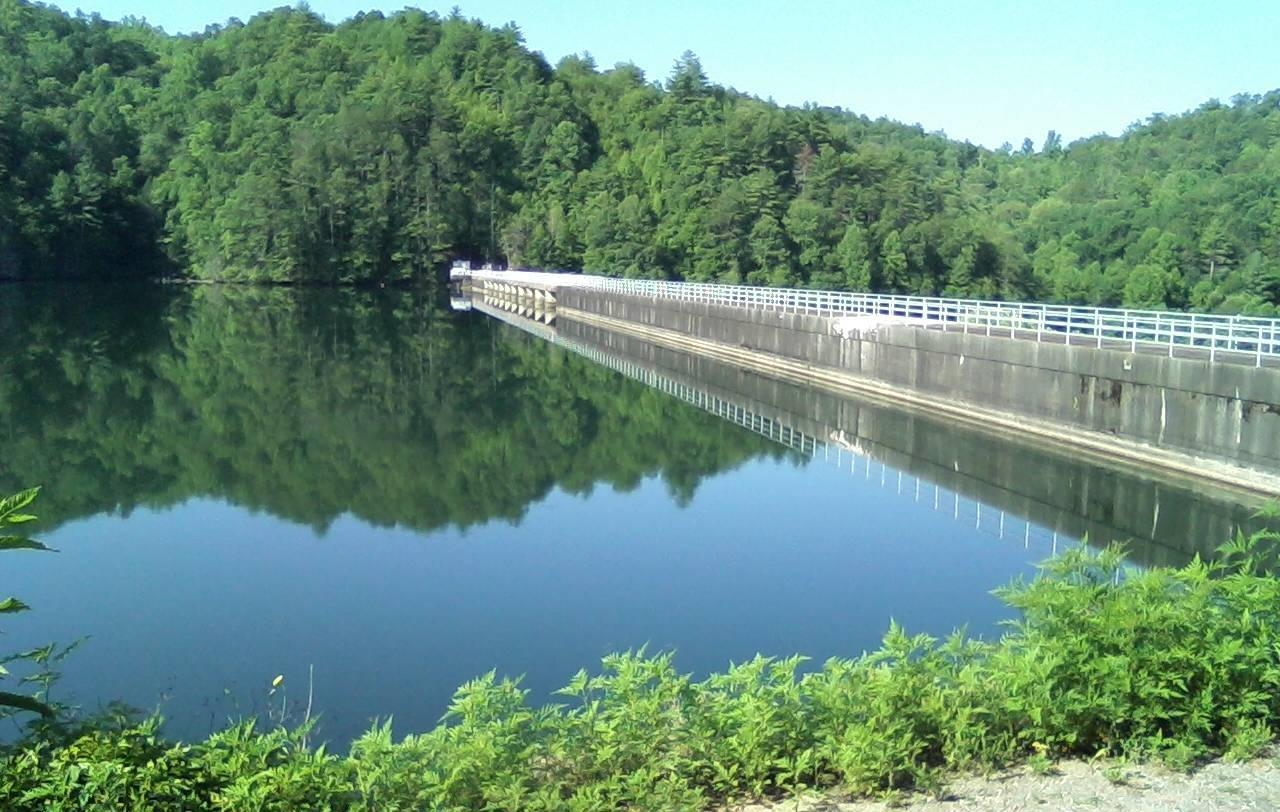
View from upstream

Apalachia Dam's powerhouse is located 12 miles (19 km) downstream from the dam at the base of a steep-walled gorge formed as the river flows between two mountain formations. The dam's 8.3-mile (13.4 km) conduit—all but 1,600 feet (490 m) of which is underground—passes behind the cliffs on the south side of the river.

== Capacity ==
Apalachia Dam is a concrete gravity diversion-type dam 150 feet (46 m) high and 1,308 feet (399 m) long, and has a generating capacity of 93,600 kilowatts. The dam's spillway is controlled by 10 radial gates with a combined discharge of 136,000 cubic feet per second (3,900 m^{3}/s). Apalachia Lake stretches for 9.8 miles (15.8 km) to the base of Hiwassee Dam, and contains 31 miles (50 km) of shoreline and 1,070 acres (430 ha) of water surface.

A 900-foot (270 m) steel penstock connects the reservoir intake at the dam site to the 8.3-mile (13.4 km) conduit. The conduit emerges from a cliffside overlooking the dam's powerhouse, where it splits into two smaller tunnels which carry the water to a valve house. From the valve house, the water drops 200 feet (61 m) through two steel penstocks to the powerhouse turbines below. The total elevation drop from lake surface to power house discharge is 394 feet (120 m) to 436 feet (133 m), depending on the lake level.

== Background and construction ==
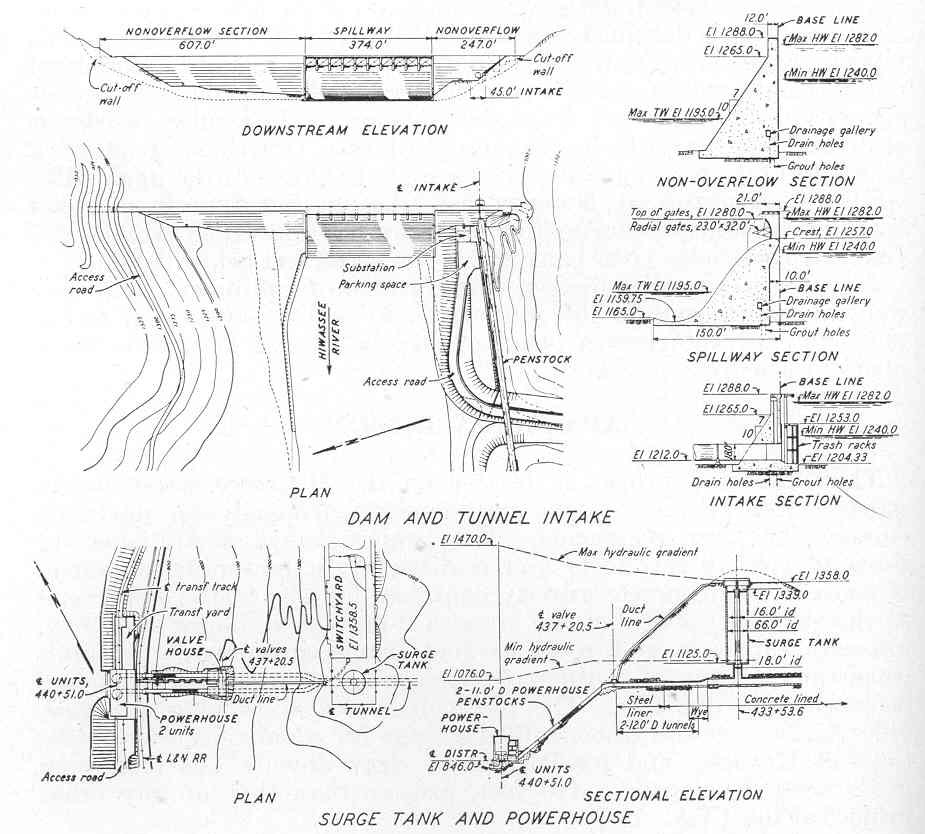
TVA's design plan for Apalachia Dam, circa 1941

Private and public entities had been aware of the hydroelectric potential of the Hiwassee River since the early 1900s. The U.S. Army Corps of Engineers identified several potential dams sites, including Apalachia, in the 1920s, and by the time the Tennessee Valley Authority was formed in 1933, several companies had bought up land and flowage rights in the Hiwassee Valley. TVA took the initiative in the valley, however, with the construction of Hiwassee Dam in the late 1930s. By 1941, the outbreak of World War II in Europe brought a drastic increase in the demand for electricity—especially to support aluminum production in the Tennessee Valley— and TVA quickly put together a plan to build several new dams, including Apalachia, all of which were authorized July 16, 1941. Work began on Apalachia the following day.

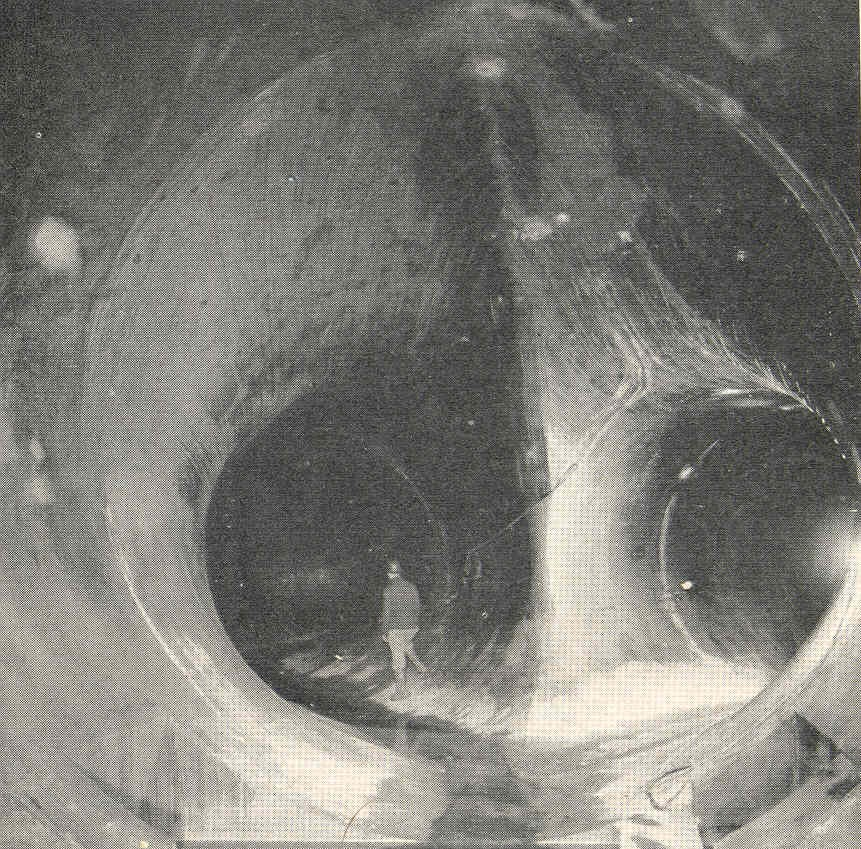
A worker walks through Apalachia's conduit tunnel

The construction of Apalachia Dam and its reservoir required the purchase of 4,500 acres (1,800 ha) of land, most of which was in possession of three private entities—the Union Power Company, the Hiwassee-Nolichucky Power Company, and the Hiwassee River Power Company, with Union holding nearly half of the 4,500 acres (18 km^{2}). After the initial purchase, the Hiwassee-Nolichucky Power Company sold TVA an additional 8,100 acres (3,300 ha), nearly tripling the reservation size. Land for the conduit was transferred by the U.S. Forest Service. Since most of the land was in possession of private companies, only 22 families and 2.4 miles (3.9 km) of roads had to be relocated.

The construction of the conduit was necessary to exploit the 12-mile (19 km) stretch of river immediately downstream from the dam site in which the river drops on average 26 feet (7.9 m) per mile. The conduit's tunnel was built using blasting and a drill jumbo, and its 235-foot (72 m) surge tank was excavated into the rock near the valve house.

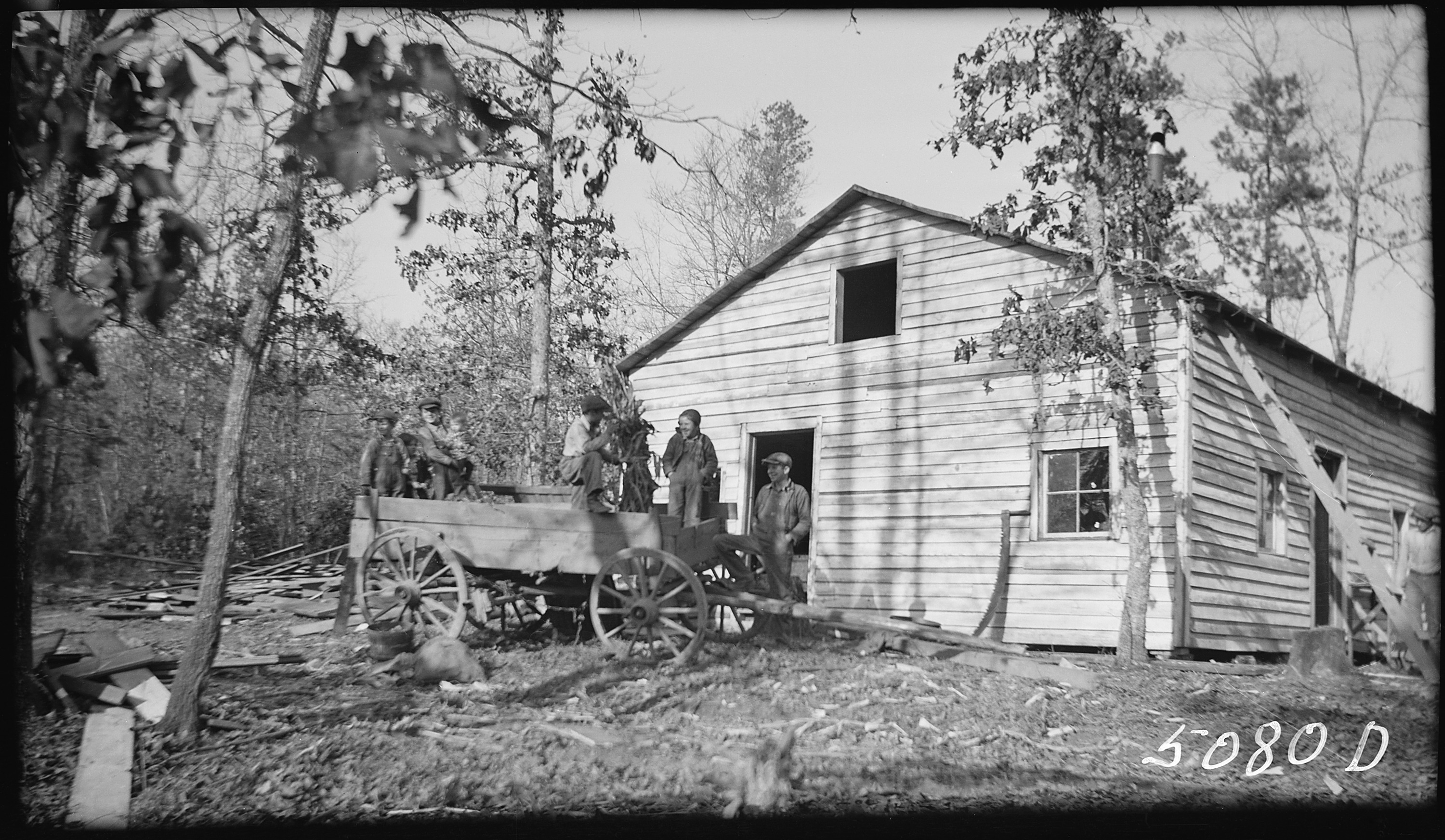
Family displaced in Cherokee County

Apalachia Dam was completed September 15, 1942, and its gates were closed February 14, 1943. The tunnel was completed April 1, 1943. The dam's first generator went online September 22, 1943, and a second went online November 17 of the same year. The total cost of the project was just over $24 million (equivalent to $347 million in 2024).

== Ecology ==
The construction of the Apalachia Dam eliminated the natural water flow on the Hiwassee River, causing the decline of Ruth's golden aster (Pityopsis ruthii), a major reason why the plant was placed on the Endangered Species List in 1985.

== See also ==
- New Deal
