= Hiwassee Lake =

Water reservoir in North Carolina, US

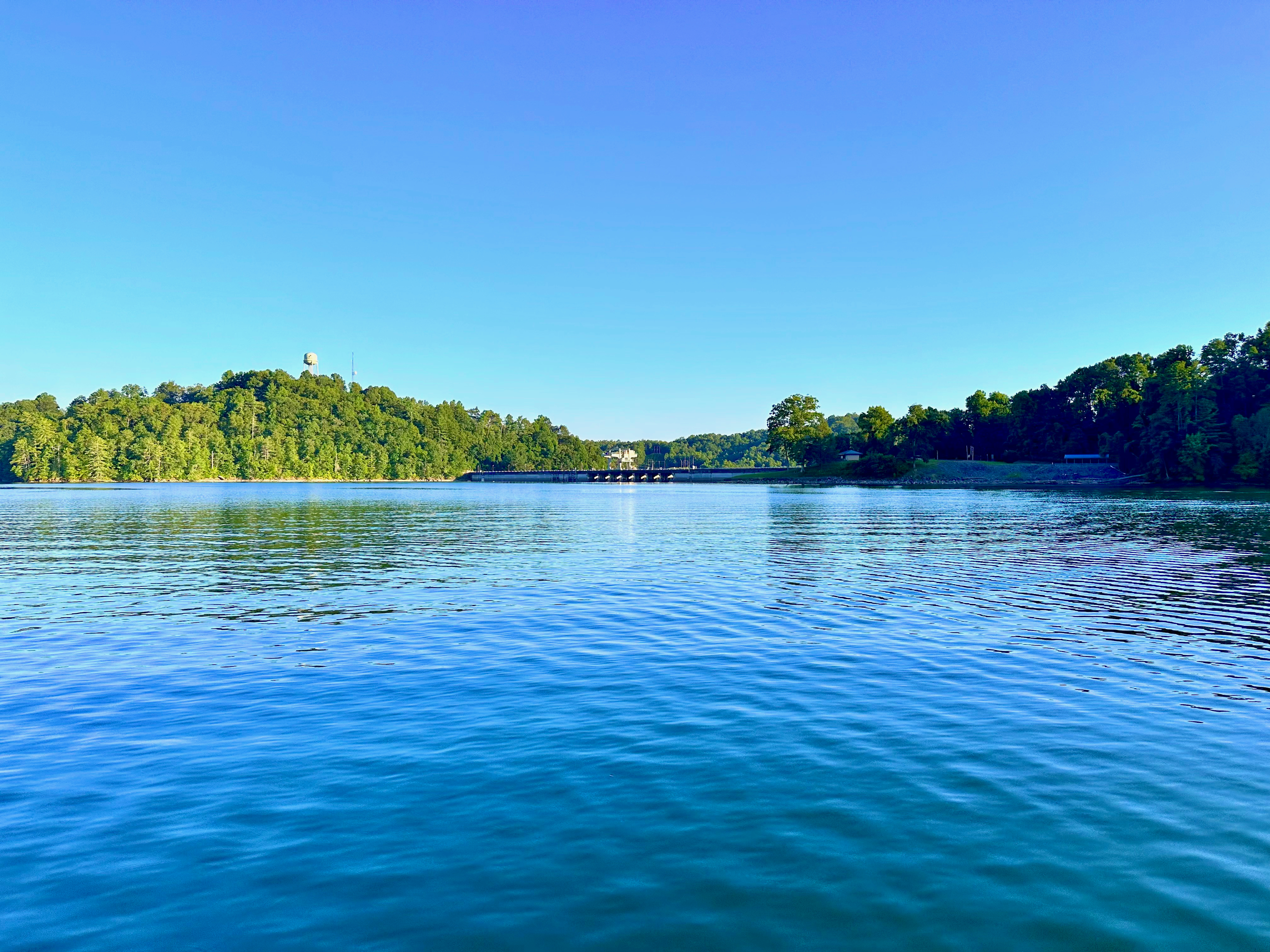
- Hiwassee Lake is impounded by Hiwassee Dam

- Location within North Carolina Location within the United States
- Location: United States
- Coordinates: 35.160°N 84.165°W
- Max. length: 22 mi (35 km)
- Surface area: 9.3 sq mi (24 km^{2})
- Water volume: 434,000 acre⋅ft (0.535 km^{3}) peak 639,590 acre⋅ft (0.78892 km^{3})
- Shore length^{1}: 180 mi (290 km)
- Surface elevation: 1,503 ft (458 m)
- Settlements: Murphy
- ^{1} Shore length is not a well-defined measure.

Hiwassee Lake is a man-made reservoir in Cherokee County, North Carolina. It lies along the Hiwassee River created by the Hiwassee Dam which finished construction in 1940. Hiwassee Lake stretches along the river for approximately 22 miles (35 km) to the town of Murphy, North Carolina. It has 180 miles (290 km) of shoreline, a storage capacity of 434,000 acre⋅ft (535,000 dam^{3}), and 205,590 acre⋅ft (253,590 dam^{3}) of flood storage.

Hiwassee Lake is 6,000 acres (2,400 ha). Its tailwaters are part of Apalachia Lake. The reservoir's operating level varies by roughly 38 feet (12 m) in a typical year. The southwestern arm of the reservoir over Persimmon Creek is known as Persimmon Lake. It reaches to a smaller dam which contains Cherokee Lake. The Nottely River also flows into Hiwassee Lake from North Georgia.

== History ==
Hiwassee Lake is named after the Hiwassee River. Two 18th-century Cherokee towns along the river were named Hiwassee. The river's name comes from the Cherokee word for large meadow, or savanna.

The Tennessee Valley Authority started work creating Hiwassee Lake in 1936. More than 24,000 acres (9,700 ha) were purchased for the project. Twenty-five miles of roads, 21 cemeteries, 462 graves, and 261 families were relocated from the site. Eight new bridges were constructed. The reservoir was completed in 1940. A small community, Hiwassee Village, developed on the south side of the reservoir.

The U.S. Navy tested torpedoes in Hiwassee Lake in 1942 during World War II. The lake was chosen due to its isolation and its depth – more than 250 feet (76 m) in places. The Navy Bureau of Ordnance installed a launcher, net, and underwater camera. Torpedoes sometimes landed in nearby farmland as the net didn't always work.

In 1951, the state record smallmouth bass (10.2-pounds) was caught at Hiwassee Lake by Archie Lumpkin. The world record striped bass (66.1 pounds) was also caught at Hiwassee Lake by Tyler Shields. Both records continue to stand as of 2025.

Bear Paw Resort opened on the lake in 1973. The U.S. Forest Service owns almost all of the property along the lake's shore. In mid-2025, Cherokee County's board of commissioners unanimously approved a petition to the federal government stating that TVA took more land than necessary to create the lake and that, instead of giving it back to the original owners, it deeded the land to the Forest Service. Commissioners claimed the Forest Service is restricting lakefront land from being made available for commercial and private development and that the agency is incapable of maintaining its property. In early 2026, commissioners reluctantly rescinded the petition after several thousand people signed a protest against converting public lands to be used for commercial development. However, commissioners continued to call for the Forest Service to provide property on Hiwassee Lake for a state park.
