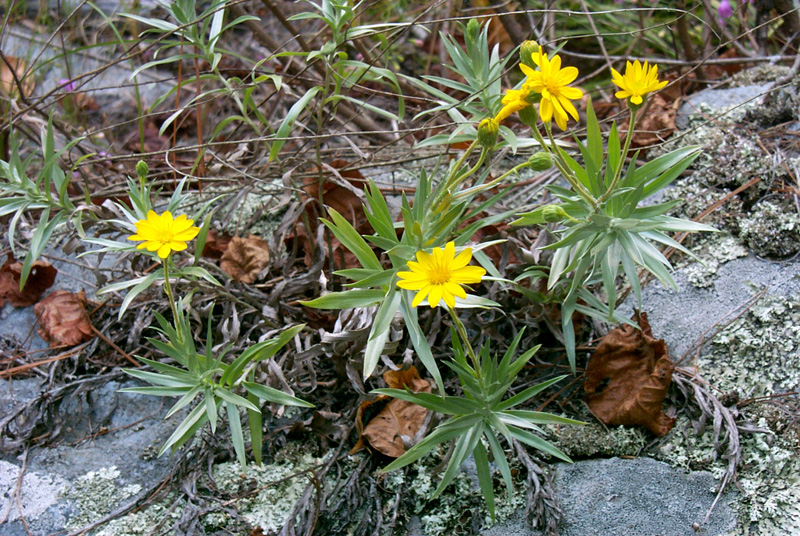

Conservation status
- Critically Imperiled (NatureServe)

Scientific classification
- Kingdom: Plantae
- Clade: Tracheophytes
- Clade: Angiosperms
- Clade: Eudicots
- Clade: Asterids
- Order: Asterales
- Family: Asteraceae
- Genus: Pityopsis
- Species: P. ruthii

Binomial name
- Pityopsis ruthii Small

Synonyms
- Chrysopsis ruthii Heterotheca ruthii

= Pityopsis ruthii =

Species of plant

Pityopsis ruthii is a rare species of flowering plant in the family Asteraceae known by the common name Ruth's golden aster. It is endemic to the US state of Tennessee, where it is known only from Polk County. It is threatened by the modification of its habitat. It is a federally listed endangered species.

== Description ==
This is a perennial herb growing 10 to 30 centimeters tall from a rhizome several centimeters in length. There are one to several erect, slender stems covered in silvery hairs. The basal leaves are lance-shaped and 3 or 4 centimeters long. Leaves on the stem are longer, overlapping, and silver-haired. The inflorescence is an array of several flower heads on hairy, glandular branches. Each head has nine to eighteen yellow ray florets.

== Habitat ==
This plant grows in soil that has accumulated in the cracks of riverbank boulders on two Tennessee rivers, the Hiwassee and Ocoee Rivers. The rocks are subjected to periodic flooding when the river levels rise, submerging the plants and scouring the substrates they grow on. The plants grow in nearly full sunlight and cannot tolerate much shade. The flooding and scouring action of the river water prevents the growth of other plants that might shade it out. The plant is associated with Liatris microcephala (smallhead blazing star), which tolerates the same kind of habitat. Other plants located near the aster include Schizachyrium scoparium (little bluestem), Andropogon gerardi (big bluestem), Agalinis tenuifolia (slenderleaf false foxglove), Symphyotrichum dumosum (button aster), and Symphyotrichum undulatum (wavyleaf aster).

== Conservation ==
This river plant is threatened by a number of processes that affect its environment. The stretches of river where it occurs are downstream from dams. The Apalachia Dam has eliminated the natural water regime in the Hiwassee River habitat. Water is now piped out of the river to a powerhouse and most of the flow comes from tributaries and runoff from surrounding hills. This stoppage of the normal river flow has allowed plants to move into the small patches of soil occupied by the aster, leading to competition and excessive shade. Troublesome competing plant species include Toxicodendron radicans (poison ivy), Parthenocissus quinquefolia (Virginia creeper), Vitis rotundifolia (wild grape), Campsis radicans (trumpet creeper), Lonicera japonica (Japanese honeysuckle), Lespedeza cuneata (lespedeza), and Microstegium vimineum (Nepal grass). Water is occasionally released from the dam when toxic pollution builds up and needs to be flushed out of the river. When the aster was placed on the endangered species list, its Hiwassee River population had declined 50% in eight years. Since then it has declined another 40% and all subpopulations are likely to become extinct within 50 years. The other population on the Ocoee River was composed of about 500 plants growing in a habitat affected by nearby mining operations, as well as power production. It is also located in an area that is subjected to trampling associated with whitewater rafting recreation on the river. Despite these threats, the Ocoee population, recently counted at 593 plants, is considered to be secure for the time being.

Conservation activities include propagation of the plant in greenhouses. This is made difficult by the infestation of the greenhouse plants by powdery mildew. The mildew is not present in the wild populations. Competing vegetation has been increasing yearly, and this is likely causing a negative impact. The Cherokee National Forest implemented a plan to remove poison ivy from aster sites, and though this was effective it was not feasible. Mechanical and chemical means are used to remove the vegetation.
