= Hiwassee Dam =

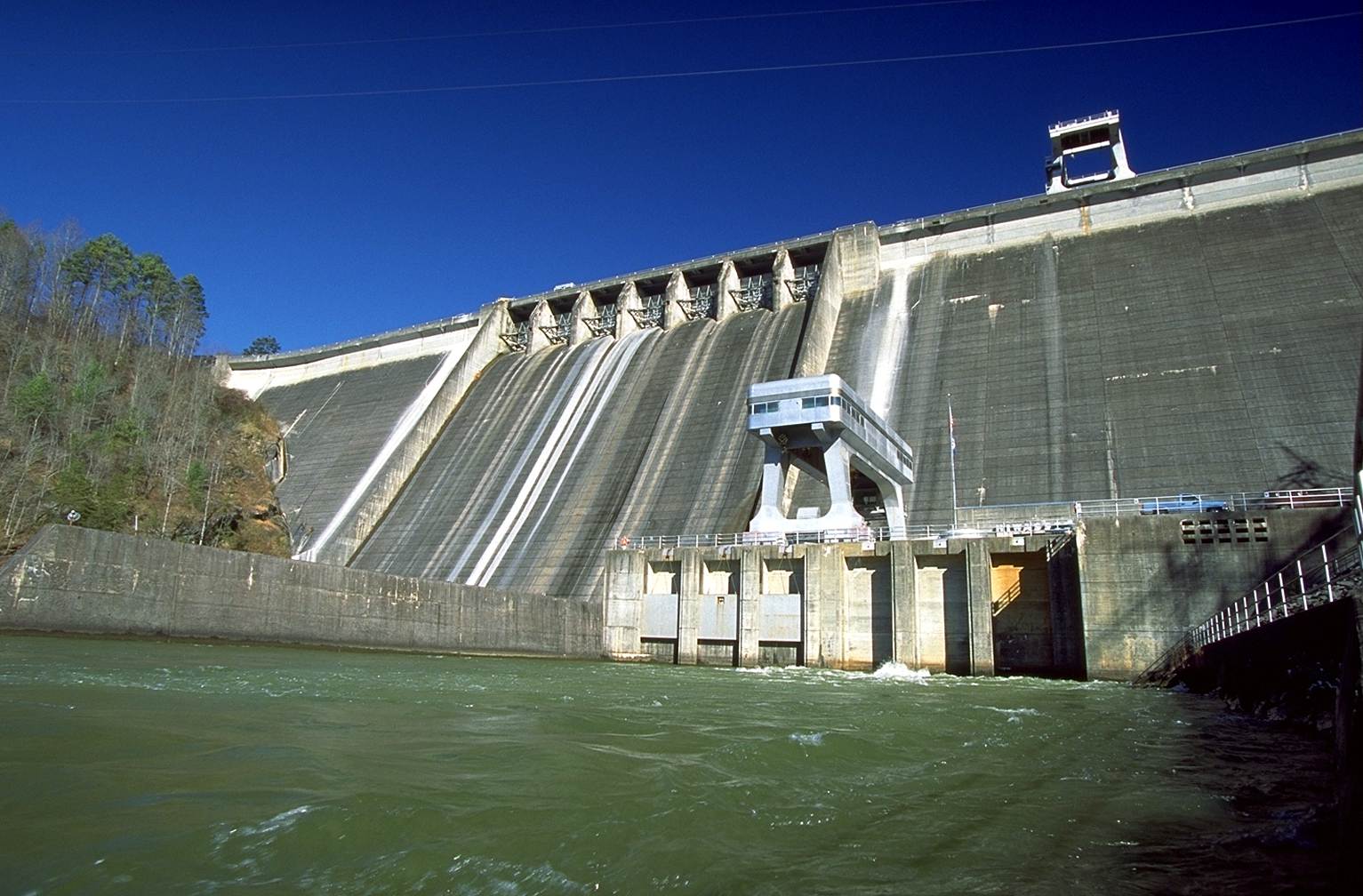
- Official name: Hiwassee Dam
- Location: Cherokee County, North Carolina, U.S.
- Coordinates: 35°9′5″N 84°10′39″W
- Construction began: July 15, 1936
- Opening date: February 8, 1940
- Operator: Tennessee Valley Authority

Dam and spillways
- Impounds: Hiwassee River
- Height: 307 ft (94 m)
- Length: 1,376 ft (419 m)

Reservoir
- Creates: Hiwassee Lake
- Total capacity: 434,000 acre⋅ft (535,000 dam^{3})
- Catchment area: 968 sq mi (2,510 km^{2})

Power Station
- Installed capacity: 185 MW

Hiwassee Dam is a hydroelectric dam on the Hiwassee River in Cherokee County, in the U.S. state of North Carolina. It is one of three dams on the river owned and operated by the Tennessee Valley Authority, which built the dam in the late 1930s to bring flood control and electricity to the region. The dam impounds the Hiwassee Lake of 6,000 acres (2,400 ha), and its tailwaters are part of Apalachia Reservoir. At 307 feet (94 m), Hiwassee Dam is the highest overspill dam east of the Mississippi River and is second only to Grand Coulee dam in the nation. At the time it was completed, it was the highest overspill dam in the world.

Hiwassee Dam is the third highest dam in the TVA system, behind only Fontana and Watauga. The dam and associated infrastructure was listed on the National Register of Historic Places in 2017. Hiwassee Dam is classified by the U.S. Army Corps of Engineers as a high-hazard dam, meaning a dam failure may pose a deadly threat to nearby residents. The dam's condition is not made available to the public due to security concerns.

Hiwassee Dam is named after the Hiwassee River. The river's name is derived from the Cherokee word for savanna, or large meadow. Two of the tribe's towns along the river in the 18th century were also called Hiwassee.

== Location ==
The Hiwassee River flows northwestward from its source in Towns County, Georgia through Western North Carolina, where it proceeds to slice a scenic valley through the southern Appalachian Mountains en route to its mouth along Chickamauga Lake in Tennessee.

Hiwassee Dam was constructed nearly 76 miles (122 km) above the river's mouth, at the downstream end of a large bend in the river known as Fowler Bend. The dam is 10 miles (16 km) upstream from Apalachia Dam (which is near the Tennessee-North Carolina state line) and 45 miles (72 km) downstream from Chatuge Dam. Hiwassee Dam and its reservoir are surrounded by the Nantahala National Forest.

Hiwassee Village, a small community that developed alongside the dam and reservoir, is located immediately south of Hiwassee Dam. North Carolina Secondary Road 1314 (Hiwassee Dam Access Road) crosses the top of the dam.

== Capacity ==
Hiwassee Dam is a concrete, gravity-overflow dam 307 feet (94 m) high and 1,376 feet (419 m) long, and has a generating capacity of 185,000 kilowatts. The dam's spillway is controlled by seven radial gates, which, along with four regulating conduits at the bottom of the dam, give the dam a total maximum discharge of 112,000 cubic feet per second (3,200 m^{3}/s).

Hiwassee Lake stretches along the river for approximately 22 miles (35 km) to the town of Murphy, North Carolina. It has 180 miles (290 km) of shoreline, a storage capacity of 434,000 acre⋅ft (535,000 dam^{3}), and 205,590 acre⋅ft (253,590 dam^{3}) of flood storage. The reservoir's operating level varies by roughly 38 feet (12 m) in a typical year.

== Pumped storage ==
In the 1950s, TVA began experiments with pumped storage at Hiwassee Dam. It used an energy-generating turbine that was run in reverse during low-demand hours to pump water from below the dam into the upper reservoir. This integration of pump and turbine was the first of its kind in the United States; further, at the time it was the largest and most powerful pump in the world, capable of pumping 1,750,000 gallons of water per minute. The "pump-turbine" at Hiwassee is designated as a "National Historic Mechanical Engineering Landmark" by the American Society of Mechanical Engineers (ASME).

== Background and construction ==
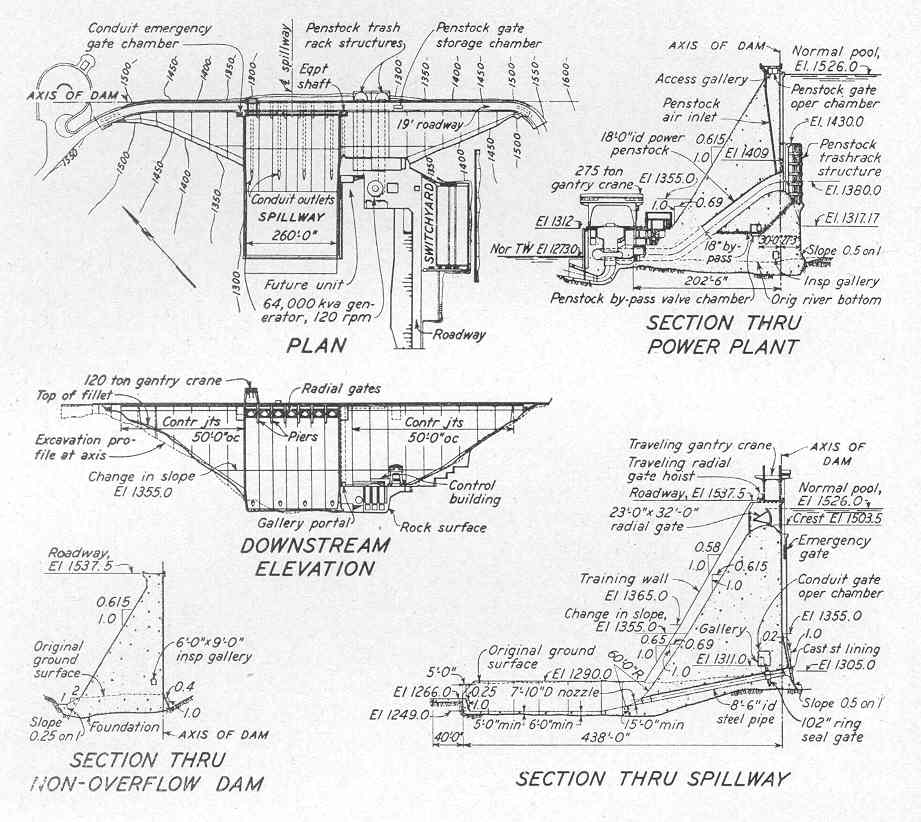
TVA's design plan for Hiwassee Dam, circa 1936

The hydroelectric potential of the Hiwassee River has been recognized since the early 1900s. The cities of Andrews and Murphy in North Carolina had already established minor dams with generating capacities along the river when major power companies began planning large-scale hydro projects in the valley in the 1920s. The Carolina-Tennessee Power Company (later reorganized as the Southern States Power Company) purchased 10,000 acres (4,000 ha) of land and flowage rights along the river in 1924 in hopes of building a large dam just above the present dam site, but the project was never fully developed.

The Tennessee Valley Authority, created as a New Deal measure in 1933 during the Franklin D. Roosevelt administration, was given oversight of flood control operations in the Tennessee River watershed, which included the Hiwassee. It also intended to develop hydroelectric projects to generate electricity for the rural region. One of TVA's first initiatives was to control flooding on the Hiwassee River, the waters of which contributed to regular seasonal flooding in the city of Chattanooga. Congress authorized the construction of Hiwassee Dam in 1935, and work began the following year. TVA also considered two sites in Tennessee for constructing Hiwassee Dam. Original plans called for a $13 million dam 185 feet (56 m) high with a 4,000 foot (1,200 m) tunnel. Southern States Power agreed to sell its Hiwassee tract to TVA, although the two entities bickered over the land's value in federal court until 1944, when TVA agreed to a final price of $250,000.

The construction of Hiwassee Dam and its reservoir required the purchase of 24,102 acres (9,754 ha) (including the 10,000 acres (4,000 ha) purchased from Southern States Power), 3,836 acres (1,552 ha) of which had to be cleared. 261 families, 462 graves, and 25 miles (40 km) of roads had to be relocated. Eight new bridges were constructed, and a Southern Railway trestle required modification. Several changes were necessary to protect the city of Murphy's riverfront, mainly at its main bridge and filtering plant.

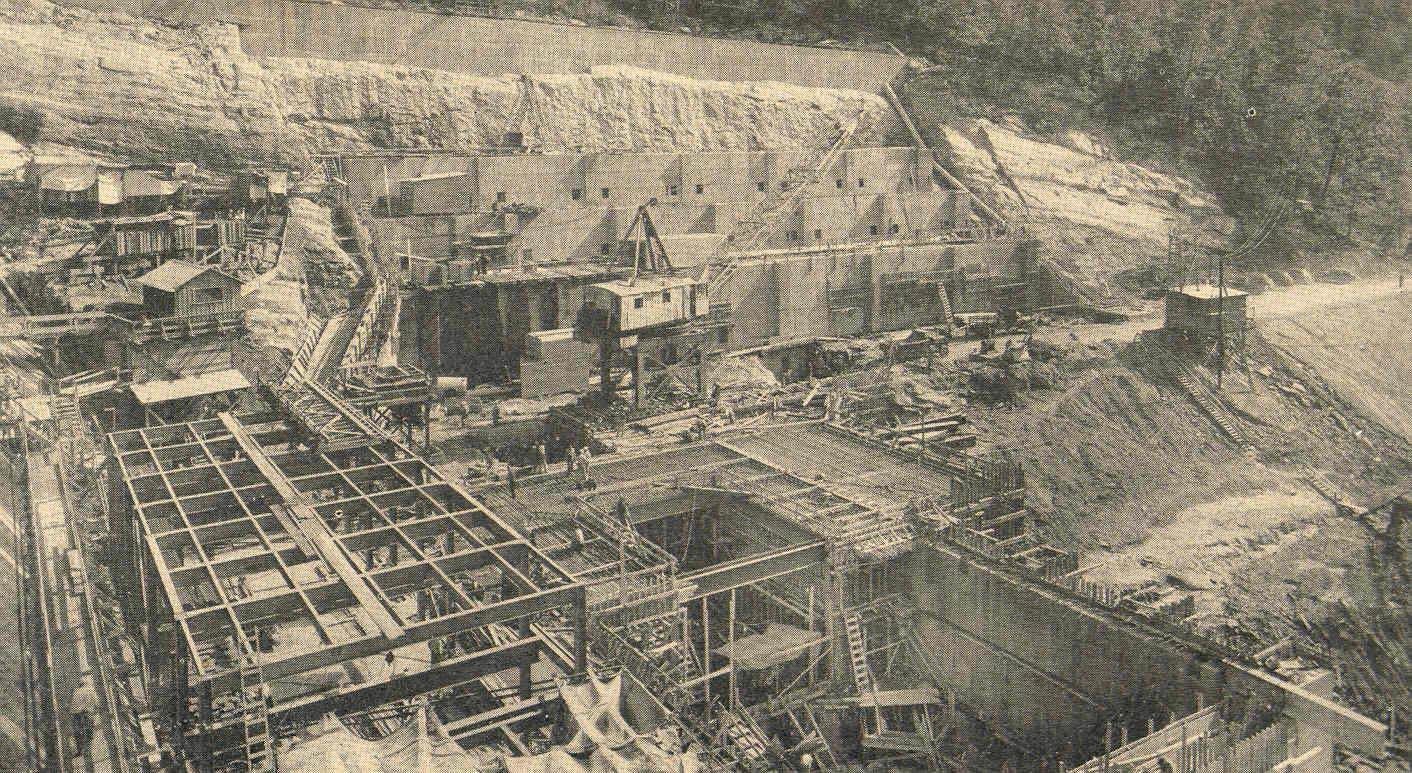
Construction of Hiwassee Dam's powerhouse and switchyard

Hiwassee Dam's height required a large mass of concrete which engineers feared would trap heat during its setting, making the dam more vulnerable to cracks. To help heat escape, the dam's concrete sections were divided into blocks no more than 50 feet (15 m) in length. The blocks' joints were formed with shear keys, and pipes were installed to allow future grouting should it become necessary. Several practices were employed to avoid trapping heat in the setting of the concrete, including the use of low-heat cement.

Hiwassee Dam's gates were closed on February 8, 1940, although minor construction work continued until later that same year. The first generator went online May 21, 1940. The dam's final price tag was just over $24 million. Shortly after the project's completion, TVA transferred 17,000 acres (6,900 ha) of its Hiwassee property reservation to the U.S. Forest Service for inclusion in the Nantahala National Forest.

In 1952 unit 2 was added, an integration of pump and turbine built by Allis-Chalmers Company. After the electrical system for the pump failed in 2011, it remained offline until being repaired in 2016.
