= Hiwassee River =

River in Georgia, North Carolina and Tennessee

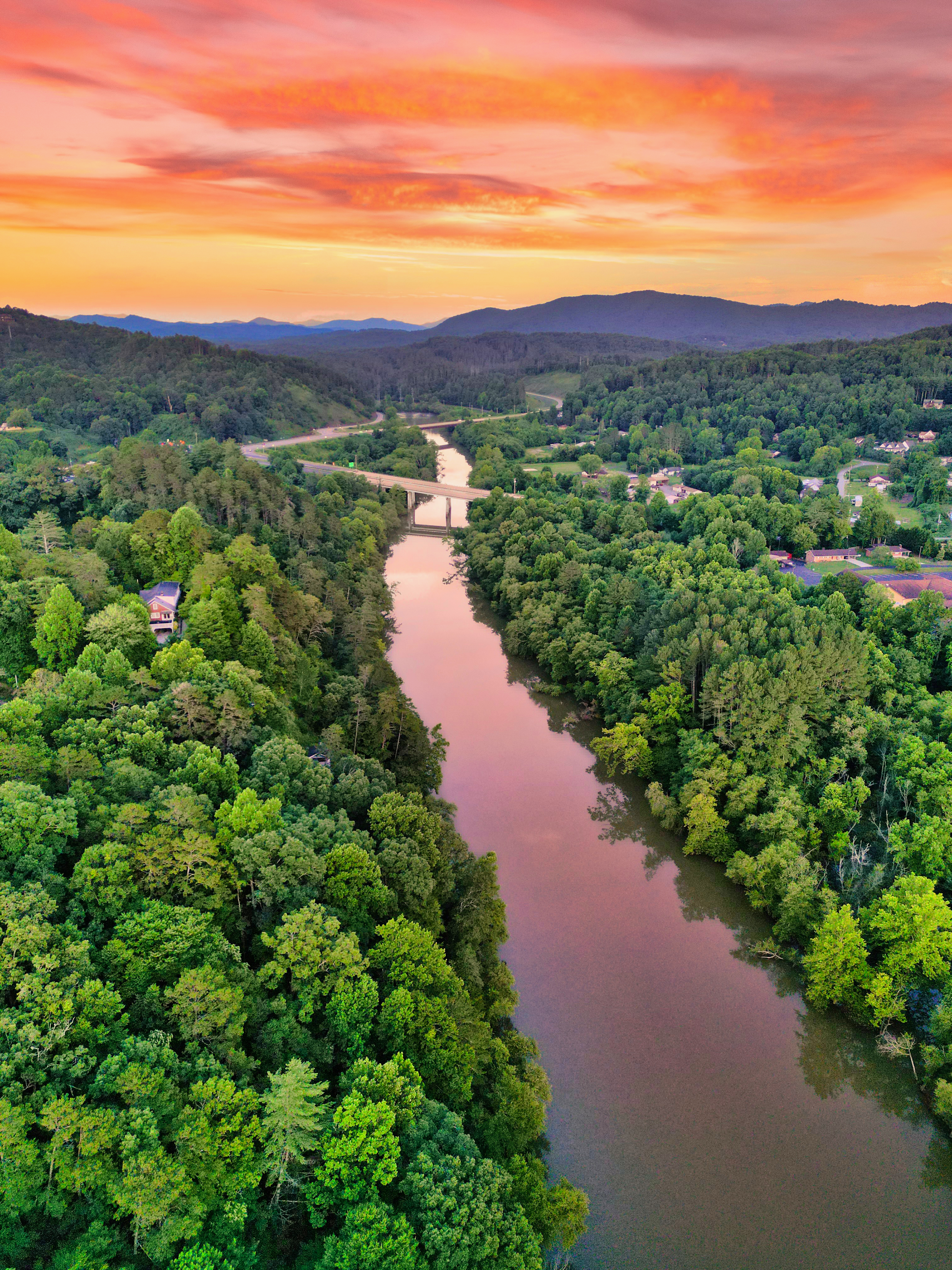
- The Hiwassee River as it flows through Murphy, July 2022

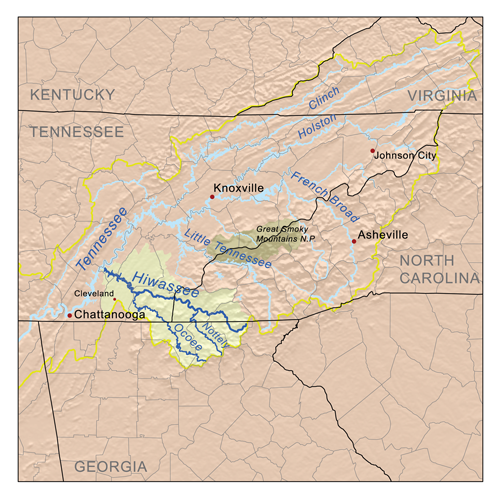
- The Hiwassee drainage basin

Location
- Country: United States
- State: Georgia, North Carolina, Tennessee

Physical characteristics
- Source: North slope of Rocky Mountain in Towns County, Georgia
  - coordinates: 34°48′4″N 83°44′4″W
  - elevation: 3,640 ft (1,110 m)
- Mouth: Tennessee River at Hiwassee Island in Meigs County, Tennessee
  - coordinates: 35°24′36″N 85°0′36″W
  - elevation: 682 ft (208 m)
- Length: 147 mi (237 km)
- Basin size: 2,700 sq mi (7,000 km^{2})
- Discharge
  - location: at the Apalachia Dam powerhouse, 53.2 miles (85.6 km) above the mouth(average for the years 1942-1979)
  - average: 2,431 cu ft/s (68.8 m^{3}/s)(average for the years 1942-1979)
  - minimum: 30 cu ft/s (0.85 m^{3}/s); September 1955
  - maximum: 47,100 cu ft/s (1,330 m^{3}/s); May 1973

Basin features
- Progression: Tennessee River → Ohio River → Mississippi River → Gulf of Mexico
- River system: Tennessee River
- Tributaries
  - left: Soapstone Creek, Wheeler Branch, Spainard Branch, Owl Creek, The Gorge, Sparks Branch, Fodder Creek, Woodring Branch, Sutton Branch, Hog Creek, Woods Creek, Mill Creek, Blair Creek, Town Creek, Qually Creek, Poplar Creek, Owenby Creek, Coot Cove, Walnut Cove, Passmore Branch, Carver Branch, Anderson Branch, Suddawig Branch, Brasstown Creek, Penland Creek, Hampston Creek, Right Prong, Nottely River, Beech Creek, Persimmon Creek, Bearpaw Creek, Micken Creek, Shouth Shoal Creek, Baine Branch, Camp Creek, Laurel Branch, Shadwick Branch, Ball Shanty Cove, Turtletown Creek, Wolf Creek, Little Branch, Butler Branch, Big Hopper Camp Branch, Smith Creek, Little Jobe Patch Branch, Big Lost Creek, Ellis Creek, Junebug Creek, Spring Falls Branch, Tieskee Creek, Lowry Branch, Spanking Stump Branch, Pell Branch, Lillard Branch, Horton Branch, Raht Chapel Branch, Ocoee River, Bacon Branch, Chestuee Creek, Parker Branch, Chatcha Creek, South Mouse Creek, Candies Creek, Roger Creek, Gunstocker Creek, Coppinger Creek, Lick Branch
  - right: High Shoals Creek, Corbin Creek, Brown Branch, Mill Creek, Big Brown Cove, Cynth Creek, Hightower Creek, Bearmeat Creek, Allen Mill Creek, Shake Rag Branch, Bell Creek, Reed Branch, Sneaking Branch, Shooting Creek, Downing Creek, Sandersen Cove, Tusquittee Creek, Carver Creek, Bob Branch, Allbone Branch, Mob Branch, Fires Creek, Watson Branch, Betty Branch, Auberry Branch, Calhoun Branch, Sudderth Branch, Mission Branch, McComb Branch, Peachtree Branch, Fall Branch, Burnthouse Branch, Will Scott Creek, Valley River, Hanging Dog Creek, Grape Creek, Hyatt Mill Creek, Taylor Branch, Chambers Creek, Beaverdam Creek, Rose Creek, Anderson Creek, Beavers Branch, North Shoal Creek, Adams Branch, Shuler Creek, Brushy Creek, Watertank Branch, Miller Cove, Womble Branch, Rough Branch, Land Branch, Coker Creek, Loss Creek, Towee Creek, Cappy Branch, Beach Bottom Branch, Plum Branch, Childers Creek, Presswood Branch, Ernie King Hollow, Ruckers Branch, Hopper Branch, Spring Creek, Watertank Branch, Coffee Branch, Gee Creek, Siccowee Branch, Dairy Branch, Hawkins Branch, Conasauga Creek, Spearman Branch, Frog Hollow Branch, Chestutee Creek, Horse Branch, McKnight Hollow, Ben Liner Hollow, Squire Liner Hollow, Oostanauta Creek, North Mouse Creek, Silvils Creek, Rogers Creek, Racepath Hollow, Price Creek, Agency Creek, Bird Hollow, Roberts Hollow

The Hiwassee River is a 147-mile (237 km) river in the states of Georgia, North Carolina, and Tennessee. In Georgia, the river is called Hiawassee. It originates from a spring on the north slope of Rocky Mountain in Towns County in northern Georgia, then flows northward into North Carolina before turning westward into Tennessee; it joins the Tennessee River a few miles west of what is now State Route 58 in Meigs County, Tennessee.

== Hydrography ==
The river is dammed by the Tennessee Valley Authority (TVA) in four locations, all in Western North Carolina: Chatuge Dam, Mission Dam (not owned by TVA), Hiwassee Dam, and Apalachia Dam. Water is diverted from the stream bed at Apalachia Dam and sent through a pipeline, which is tunneled through the mountains for eight miles (13 km); then it flows through the Apalachia Powerhouse to generate electricity. The stretch of the river that flows between Apalachia Dam and Apalachia Powerhouse features reduced flow. The John Muir Trail in Tennessee's Cherokee National Forest goes along this part of the river.

The 23-mile (37 km) stretch of river that flows from the North Carolina/Tennessee state line to U.S. Highway 411 near Delano is designated as a Tennessee State Scenic River (Class III Partially Developed River). For recreational purposes, it is managed by the Tennessee Resource Management Division, in cooperation with TVA. The river features Class I through Class III rapids, depending on water levels.

After exiting the mountains through a gorge, the Hiwassee broadens, meandering through rural Polk and Bradley counties in Tennessee. It is crossed by a bridge carrying US-411 soon after it exits the mountains. U.S. Route 11 passes over the river at Calhoun and Charleston, Tennessee, where local industries such as Bowater Newsprint Mill and Arch/Olin Chemical use river water in their operations.

At this point the river interfaces with the impoundment of Chickamauga Dam (located in Chattanooga, Tennessee). Many marshes and wetlands surround the main channel, providing rich habitats for wildlife and areas for hunting and fishing.

Interstate 75 passes over the river on the border of McMinn and Bradley counties. The Hiwassee continues westward; it is crossed by SR 58's bridge on its way to its confluence with the Tennessee River. This area of the river is enjoyed by boaters, fishermen, and water skiers.

Major tributaries include Valley River, Nottely River, Coker Creek, Big Lost Creek, Spring Creek, Conasauga Creek, and Toccoa/Ocoee River.

== Etymology ==
The Hiwassee River has been known by many variant spellings, particularly Hiawassee, which is also the name of the Georgia town through which the river flows. Other alternate spellings include Heia Wassea, Highwassee, Euphasee, and Quannessee. Some say the name came from the Cherokee word Ayuhwasi, meaning meadow or savanna; the river is known in Cherokee as ᎭᏳᏩᏒ ᎡᏉᏂ ᏄᏪᏴᎢ, romanized: hayuwasv equoni nuweyvi.

== History ==
The Hiwassee River passes through Murphy, North Carolina, where it flows past a site famous in Cherokee Indian mythology. The legend tells of a house-sized leech that could command the waters and use them to sweep hapless people to the bottom of the river and consume them. It was known as Tlanusi-yi, "The Leech Place."

The river flows west from North Carolina into Tennessee. This area is popular for whitewater rafting, whitewater canoeing, and whitewater kayaking. Recreational fishing is popular with several outfitters located near the river, and there is also industrial activity along the river, such as paper mills.

Brittannica reports that, "Snail darters, which had previously lived only on the Little Tennessee River, were transplanted to the Hiwassee River following a celebrated ecological controversy in the 1970s over the building of Tellico Dam on the Little Tennessee".

The Interstate 75 bridge crossed the Hiwassee between McMinn and Bradley counties in Tennessee. This was the site of a fatal 99-vehicle accident in December 1990, during extremely foggy weather in the area of a paper mill in the valley. During the years since then, a computerized system of warning signs and lights has been built on that stretch of Interstate 75 to warn automobiles and trucks against incidents of foul weather, characterized by heavy rains and clouds. Many serious collisions had occurred in this area.

== See also ==
- Hiwassee Lake
- List of rivers of Tennessee
