= Hiawassee Township, Clay County, North Carolina =

Township in Clay County, North Carolina

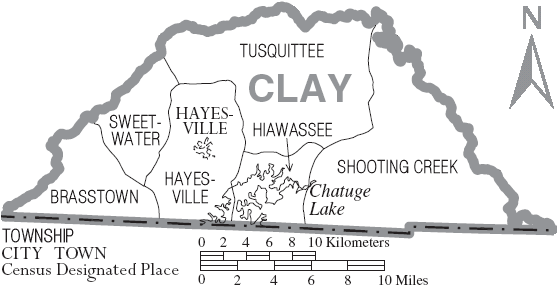
Map of Clay County, North Carolina With Municipal and Township Labels

Hiawassee is a township of Clay County, North Carolina, United States. It is the central most and smallest township in the county, situated between Hayesville Township to the west, Shooting Creek Township to the east and Tusquittee Township to the north. The other two are Brasstown and Sweetwater.

== Cities and Towns ==
Hiawassee is home to one unincorporated community called Elf, North Carolina, that lies on the east side of Lake Chatuge.
