= Sweetwater Township =

Sweetwater Township may refer to:

- Sweetwater Township, Clay County, North Carolina
- Sweetwater Township, Lake County, Michigan
