= Warne, North Carolina =

- Unincorporated community
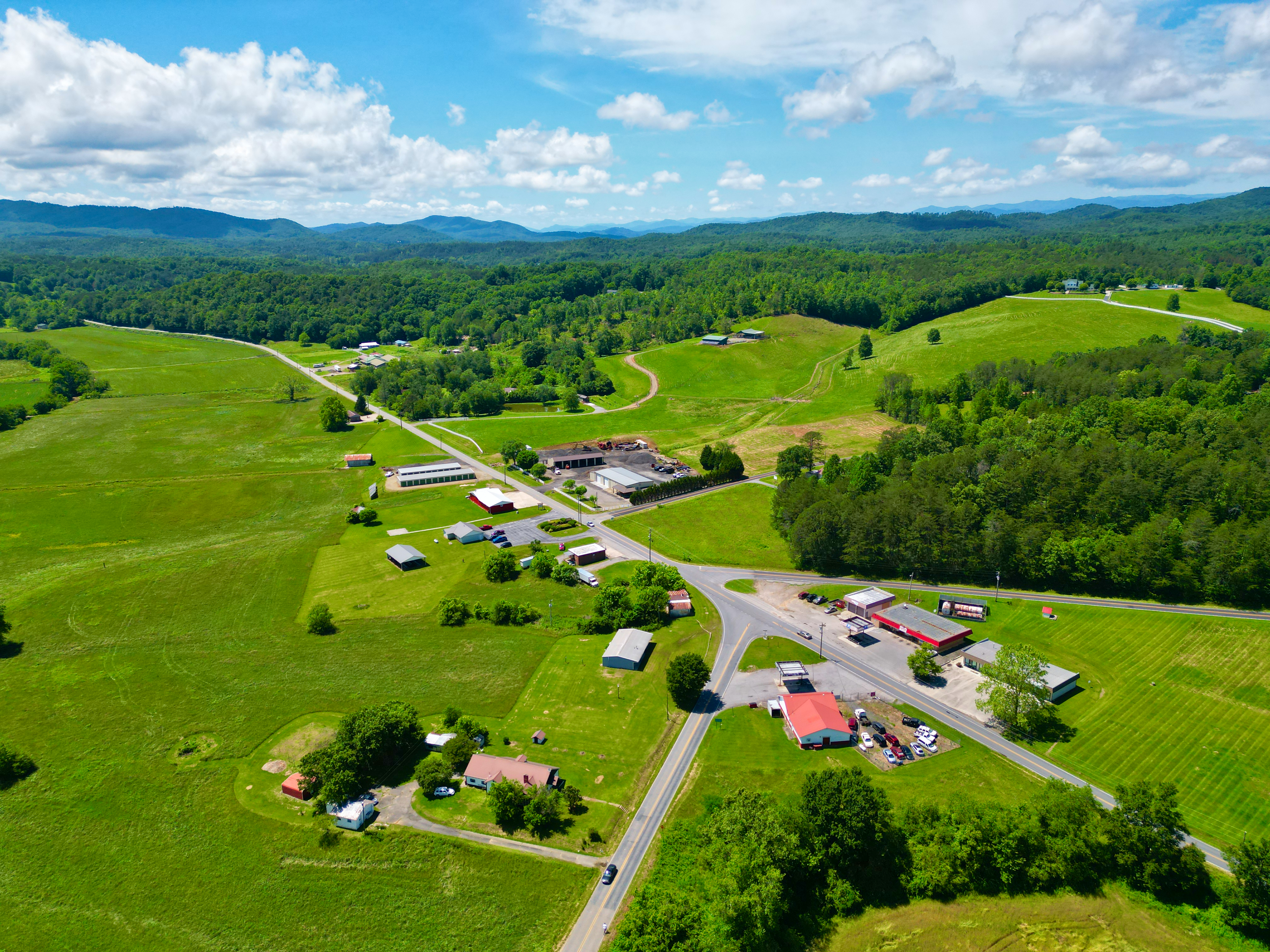
- An aerial photo of Warne in 2024
- Motto: Where your welcome is never "Warne" out
- Location within the state of North Carolina
- Coordinates: 34°59′40″N 83°53′35″W
- Country: United States
- State: North Carolina
- County: Clay
- Elevation: 1,736 ft (529 m)
- Time zone: UTC-5 (Eastern (EST))
  - Summer (DST): UTC-4 (EDT)
- ZIP codes: 28909
- Area code: 828
- GNIS feature ID: 1020542

Warne (/ˈwɔːrn/ "worn") is an unincorporated community in Brasstown Township, Clay County, North Carolina, United States. In 2010, Clay County was the fourth least populated county in North Carolina, inhabited by approximately 10,587 people. The region has added considerably to its population, a 20.6% increase since 2000. Warne is closer to the capitals of five other states (Georgia, Alabama, Tennessee, South Carolina, and Kentucky) than to Raleigh, the capital of North Carolina.

Warne's elevation is 1,736 feet (529 m) above sea level. It has an area of 8.05 square miles (21 km^{2}). It has a volunteer fire department and a post office, with the ZIP code of 28909.

== History ==
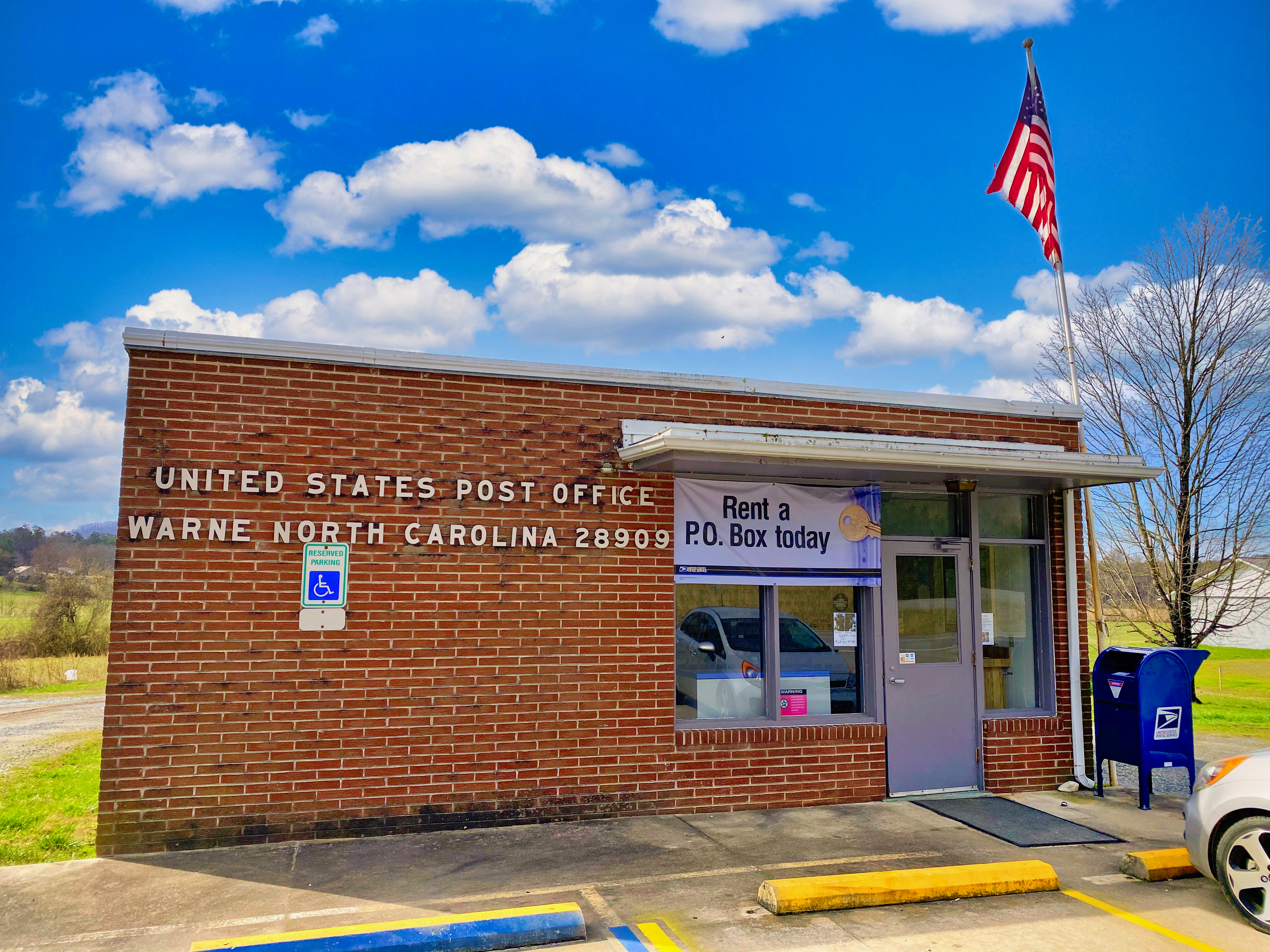
The Warne post office

Warne is thought to be named for William Warne who, along with William Calhoun, operated a gold mine in the area around 1858. Warne's U.S. Post Office opened in 1887. Construction on US 64 between Hayesville, Warne, and Brasstown started in 1921. The gold mine remained in operation through the 1930s. The Ingram Mule Barn erected near Warne in the late 1800s to early 1900s is now on display at the Foxfire Museum and Heritage Center in Mountain City, Georgia.

In 1926, the five-classroom Ogden School opened to consolidate small schools in Warne and neighboring Brasstown. It offered up to high school classes and closed in 1975. One of Clay County's only manufacturing companies, Lidseen of North Carolina, Inc., has operated a metal fabrication plant in Warne since 1957. Warne's volunteer fire department started in 1984. Warne's community center was constructed in 1998 and serves as the area's polling place. Commercial tubing began in Warne in spring 2021 on Brasstown Creek when West Tubing Company opened at the site of the former Tellico Lace plant.

== Geography ==
=== Topography ===
Warne is located in the southeastern United States in the western portion of North Carolina, approximately halfway between Atlanta and Knoxville. The location in the Blue Ridge Mountains has helped the community retain a rural character, surrounded by wildlife such as bear, deer, fox and recently reintroduced elk.

Warne is 10 miles (16 km) north of Brasstown Bald, the highest mountain in Georgia at 4,784 feet (1,458 m) above sea level.

=== Climate ===
Warne has a humid subtropical climate, (Cfa) according to the Köppen classification, with hot, humid summers and mild, but occasionally cold winters by the standards of the southern United States.

July highs average 85 °F (29 °C) or above, and lows average 55 °F (12.8 °C). Infrequently, temperatures can even exceed 100 °F (38 °C). January is the coldest month, with an average high of 48 °F (9 °C), and low of 33 °F (.6 °C).

Like the rest of the southeastern U.S., Warne receives abundant rainfall, which is relatively evenly distributed throughout the year. Average annual rainfall is 55.9 inches (1,420 mm). Blizzards are rare but possible; one nicknamed the 1993 Storm of the Century hit the entire Eastern United States in March, 1993.

Climate data for Warne

Month	Jan	Feb	Mar	Apr	May	Jun	Jul	Aug	Sep	Oct	Nov	Dec
Average high Fº (Cº)	47.8 (8.8)	52.2 (11.2)	61.1 (16.2)	69.9 (21.0)	77.3 (25.2)	83.3 (28.5)	85.8 (29.9)	85.6 (29.8)	80.7 (27.0)	71.8 (22.1)	61.9 (16.5)	51.4 (10.8)
Average low Fº (Cº)	24.1 (-4.4)	26.1 (-3.3)	32.9 (0.5)	39.9 (4.4)	49.1 (9.5)	56.8 (13.8)	61.4 (16.3)	60.9 (16)	54.8 (12.7)	41.6 (5.3)	34.2 (1.2)	26.8 (-2.9)
Precipitation inches (mm)	5.2 (132)	5.2 (132)	6.0 (152.4)	4.6 (116.8)	4.6 (116.8)	4.2 (106.7)	5.5 (139.7)	4.1 (121.9)	3.7 (94.0)	3.3 (83.2)	4.1 (104.1)	4.8 (121.9)

=== Nearby communities ===
These are towns within an approximate 15-mile (24 km) radius of Warne.

== Demographics ==
According to the 2000 Census, Warne had a population of 573 people living in 317 households with a population density of 71.17 people per square mile (27.48/km2). Of the 317 households, 227 were occupied, 90 were vacant, and 71 were used only occasionally such as vacation homes. 91.2% of households are owner-occupied while 8.8% rent. Average household size of rental occupied units were 12% larger than owner-occupied homes while the median house value was $81,300.00. 16.7% of rental homes remain vacant.

Of the 227 occupied households, 30.8% had children under the age of 18 living with them, 68.3% were married couples living together, 5.7% had a female householder with no husband present, and 22.9% were non-families. 18.5% of all households were made up of individuals, and 10.6% had someone living alone who was 65 years of age or older. The average household size was 2.52 and the average family size was 2.89.

The community's population is spread out, with 20.8% under the age of 18, 6.8% from 15 to 19, 14.5% from 20 to 34, 33.0% from 35 to 54, and 12.6% who were 55 to 64 and 16.3% aged 65 or over. The median age was 41.9 years.

98.3% of Warne residents are White, 1.4% are African American, 3% are Hispanic or Latino of any race, and .3% are of other races

Warne was not specially delineated for population statistics after 2000.

== Economy ==
=== Occupations ===
The largest employment sector for the area is the sales and office industries, employing about 1/3 (32.5%) of the population, followed by production and transportation, which employs close to 1/4 (22.5%) of the population. The service industry provides jobs for the next largest section of the working population, at close to 1/5 (17.5%), followed closely by construction, extraction and maintenance, which provides jobs for 15.7%. The remaining 12.1% work in management or professional industries.

=== Household income ===
1.9% make less than $10,000 per year. The largest percentage at 36.9% make between $15,000 and $24,999 per year. 16.8% make between $50,000 and $74,999 per year and 20.1% make between $35,000 and $49,999 per year. 22% make between $50,000 and $74,999 per year while the remaining 2.3% make over $75,000 per year.

8.4% of Warne individuals are unemployed with 3.9% living below poverty. Median household income is $33,120.

== Arts and culture ==
Located in Brasstown Township, Warne is surrounded by many locations of cultural significance such as the John C. Campbell Folk School, which offers weekly and weekend classes in traditional and contemporary crafts such as basketry.

=== Religion ===
Local churches include Mount Pisgah Baptist Church, Shady Grove Church and Copperhill Church.

== Parks and recreation ==
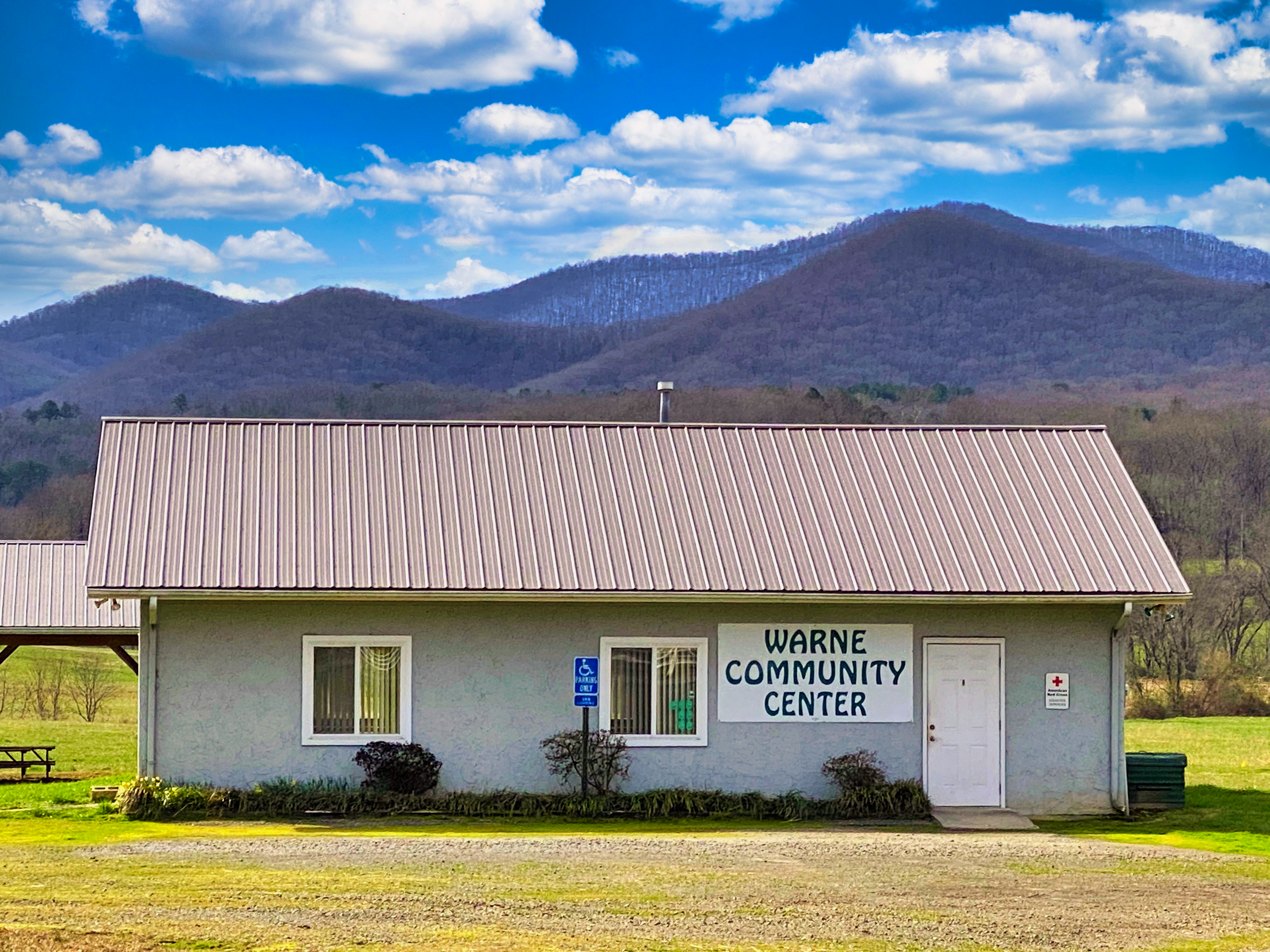
The Warne, N.C., community center

Warne is a very rural town, surrounded by wildlife, countryside, and national forests. It lies just 0.5 miles (800 m) north of the Nantahala National Forest, 1.8 miles (2.9 km) north of the Chattahoochee National Forest, 5.5 miles (8.9 km) west of Chatuge Lake, 11.8 miles (19.0 km) northeast of Nottely Lake, and approximately 15 miles (24 km) west of the Appalachian Trail.

== Government ==
Warne is an unincorporated community with no formal government; services are provided at the county level.

=== Law enforcement ===
Warne is protected by Sheriff Mark Buchanan of the Clay County Sheriff's Office in Hayesville.

==== Crime data ====
According to the 2009 Crime Rate Index, Warne was rated a personal crime risk of 23, which reflects the combined risks of rape, murder, assault and robbery. Warne also scored a property crime risk of 45, which reflects the combined risks of burglary, larceny and motor vehicle theft. Both scores are compared to a national average of 100.

== Education ==
The public school system (Clay County Schools) is run by the Clay County Board of Education with superintendent Scott Penland. The school system is small, with an active enrollment of approximately 1,250 students attending a total of three schools on a single campus. All schools are accredited by the North Carolina State Board of Education, and Hayesville High School is accredited by the Southern Association of Colleges and Schools. Test scores are unfailingly in the top 10% of all North Carolina Schools.

Hayesville Elementary School covers grades K-4 and has an enrollment of 450 students. It has been rated Exemplary every year since the ABCs began.

Hayesville Middle School covers grades 5–8 with an enrollment of approximately 400 students. It has been classified as either a School of Distinction or School of Excellence every year since the ABCs began.

Hayesville High School covers grades 9–12 with an enrollment of approximately 400. It has the best SAT scores of any school in the area.

== Media ==
Warne and the surrounding area are served by a few local television stations, numerous local radio stations that serve several genres of music including sports, news and talk radio, and three local papers.

Local television channels include W50AB (Channel 50), based in Hiawassee, Georgia; W42AT (Channel 42), based in Hayesville, North Carolina; and W31AN (Channel 31), based in Murphy, North Carolina

Warne is served by 11 local radio stations. WCVP-AM (600), WCNG-FM (102.7), and WKRK-AM (1320) are based in Murphy, North Carolina. WJRB (95.1) and is based in Young Harris, Georgia. WCVP-FM (95.9) is based in Robbinsville; WGHC-AM (1400) is based in Clayton, Georgia; and WFSC-AM (1050), WPFJ-AM (1480), WFQS-FM (91.3), and WNCC (96.7) are based in Franklin, North Carolina. WYHG-AM (770) was based in Young Harris, Georgia.

Clay County's newspaper is the Clay County Progress. Two other nearby newspapers are the Cherokee Scout and the Towns County Herald.

== Infrastructure ==
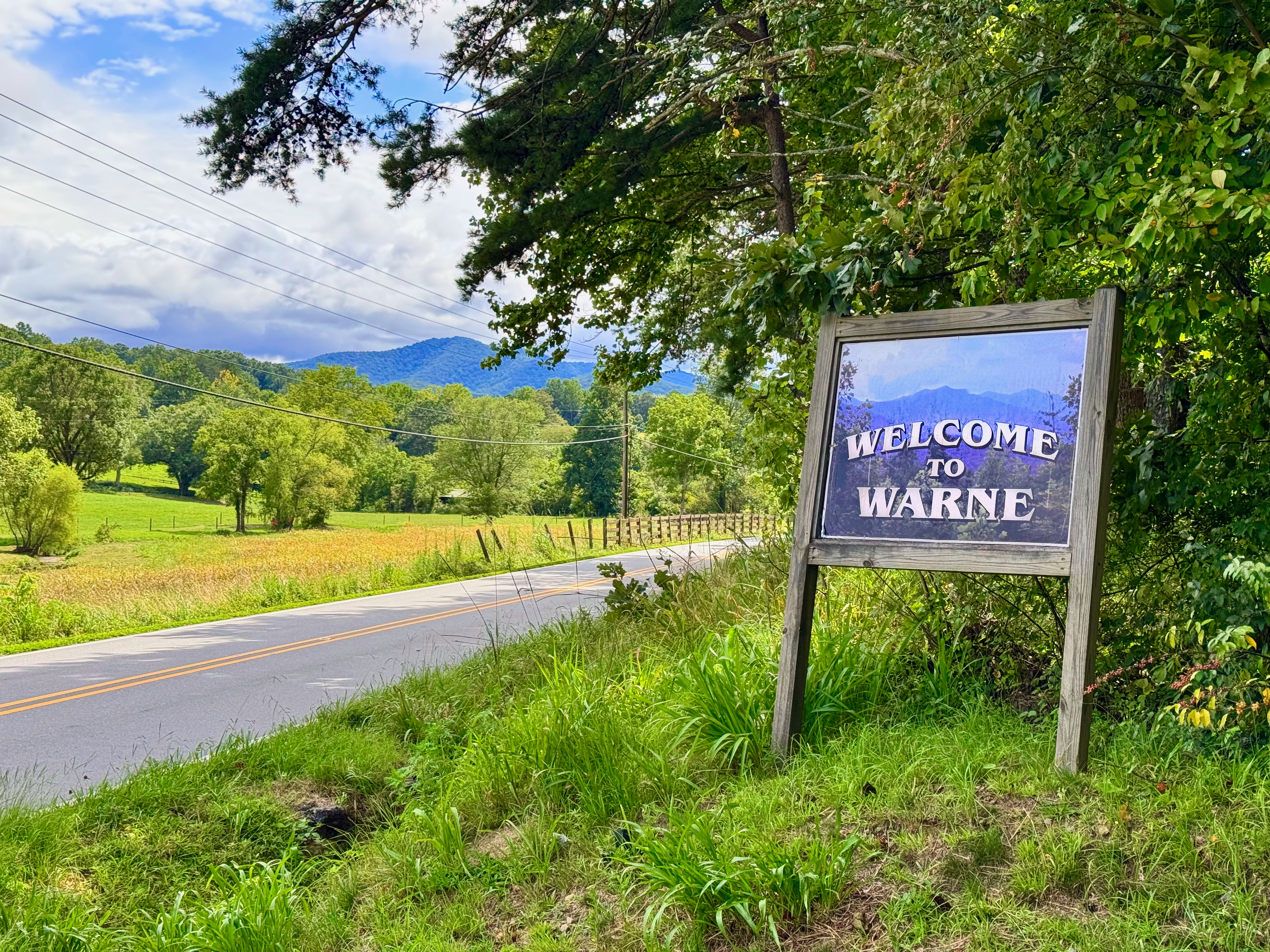
A "Welcome to Warne" sign on Old Hwy 64

=== Transportation ===
Warne sits on Old Hwy 64, which connects Hayesville to the northeast and Brasstown to the northwest. Young Harris Road connects Warne to State Road 515 in Young Harris, Georgia.

Western Carolina Regional Airport (ICAO: KRHP, FAA LID: RHP), known locally as the Murphy Airport, Andrews Airport, or Murphy-Andrews Airport, is located approximately 20 miles (32 km) north of Warne between the towns of Andrews and Murphy.

Blairsville Airport (ICAO: KDZJ, FAA LID: DZJ, formerly 46A) lies approximately 16.8 miles (27.0 km) southwest of Warne, near Blairsville, Georgia.

=== Utilities ===
Electricity for Warne (and all of Clay County) is provided by Blue Ridge Mountain Electric Membership Corporation, a member-owned cooperative located in Young Harris, GA. Blue Ridge Mountain EMC purchases wholesale electricity from the Tennessee Valley Authority (TVA), and distributes it in Towns, Union, and Fannin counties in Georgia, and Clay and Cherokee counties in North Carolina.

Natural gas is supplied by Piedmont Gas, which serves over 1 million customers in North and South Carolina and Tennessee. In 2004 the company formed the Piedmont Natural Gas Foundation and has since invested over 4 million dollars in the various communities it serves.

Industrial and personal waste is landfilled.

=== Healthcare ===
Erlanger Western Carolina Hospital, located in Peachtree, sports 57 hospital beds and a 120-bed nursing home.
