= Clay County, North Carolina =

County in North Carolina, United States

- County
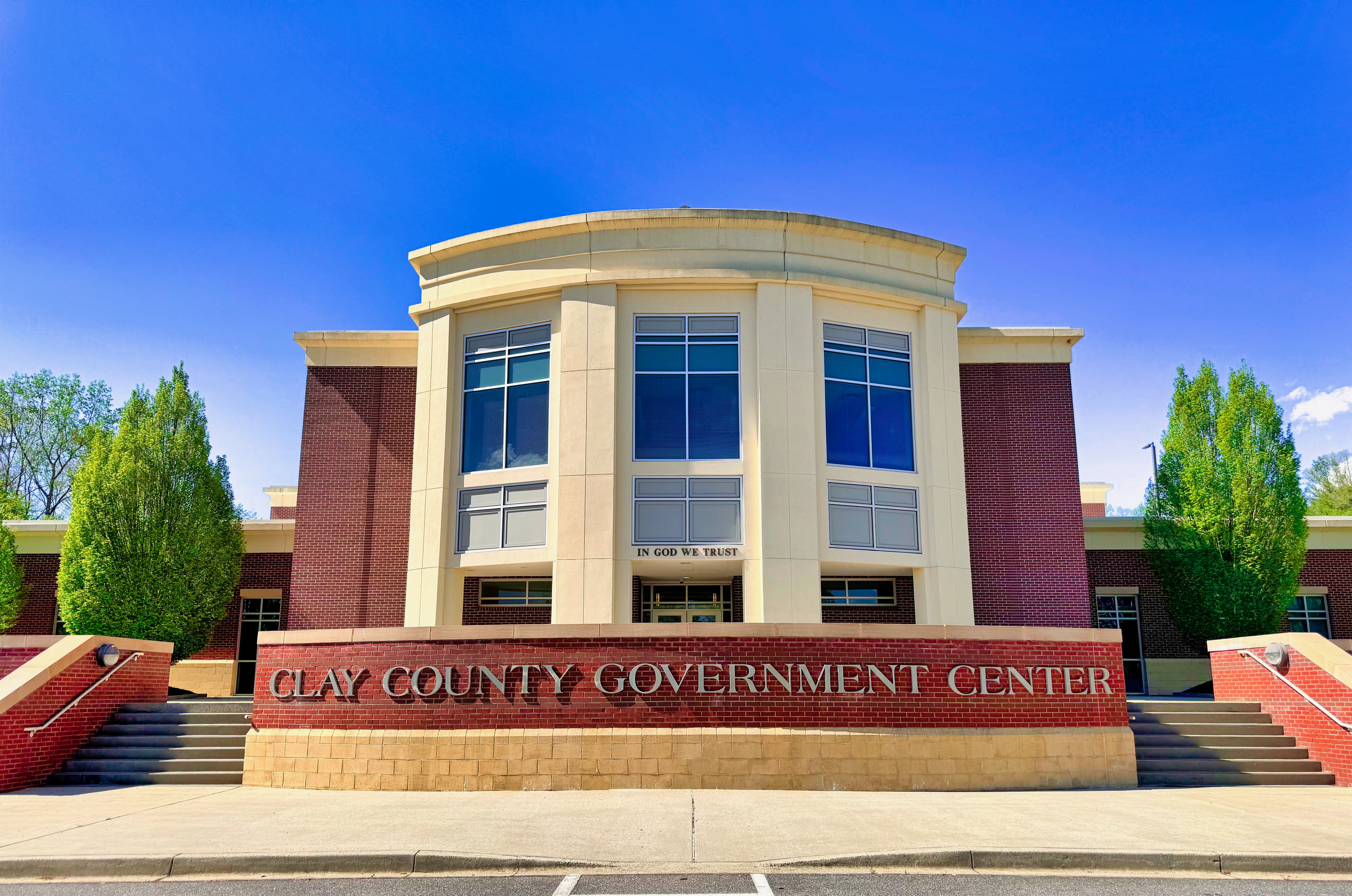
- Clay County Government Center

- Seal
- Motto: "Clay County – It's Good for the Soul"
- Location within the U.S. state of North Carolina
- Interactive map of Clay County, North Carolina
- Coordinates: 35.05°N 83.75°W
- Country: United States
- State: North Carolina
- Founded: 1861
- Named for: Henry Clay
- Seat: Hayesville
- Largest community: Hayesville

Area
  - Total: 220.78 sq mi (571.8 km^{2})
  - Land: 214.98 sq mi (556.8 km^{2})
  - Water: 5.80 sq mi (15.0 km^{2}) 2.63%

Population (2020)
  - Total: 11,089
  - Estimate (2025): 12,239 ▲
  - Density: 51.582/sq mi (19.916/km^{2})
- Time zone: UTC−5 (Eastern)
  - Summer (DST): UTC−4 (EDT)
- Congressional district: 11th
- Website: www.clayconc.com

Clay County is a county located in the far western part of U.S. state North Carolina. As of the 2020 census, the county population was 11,089. The county seat is Hayesville.

== History ==
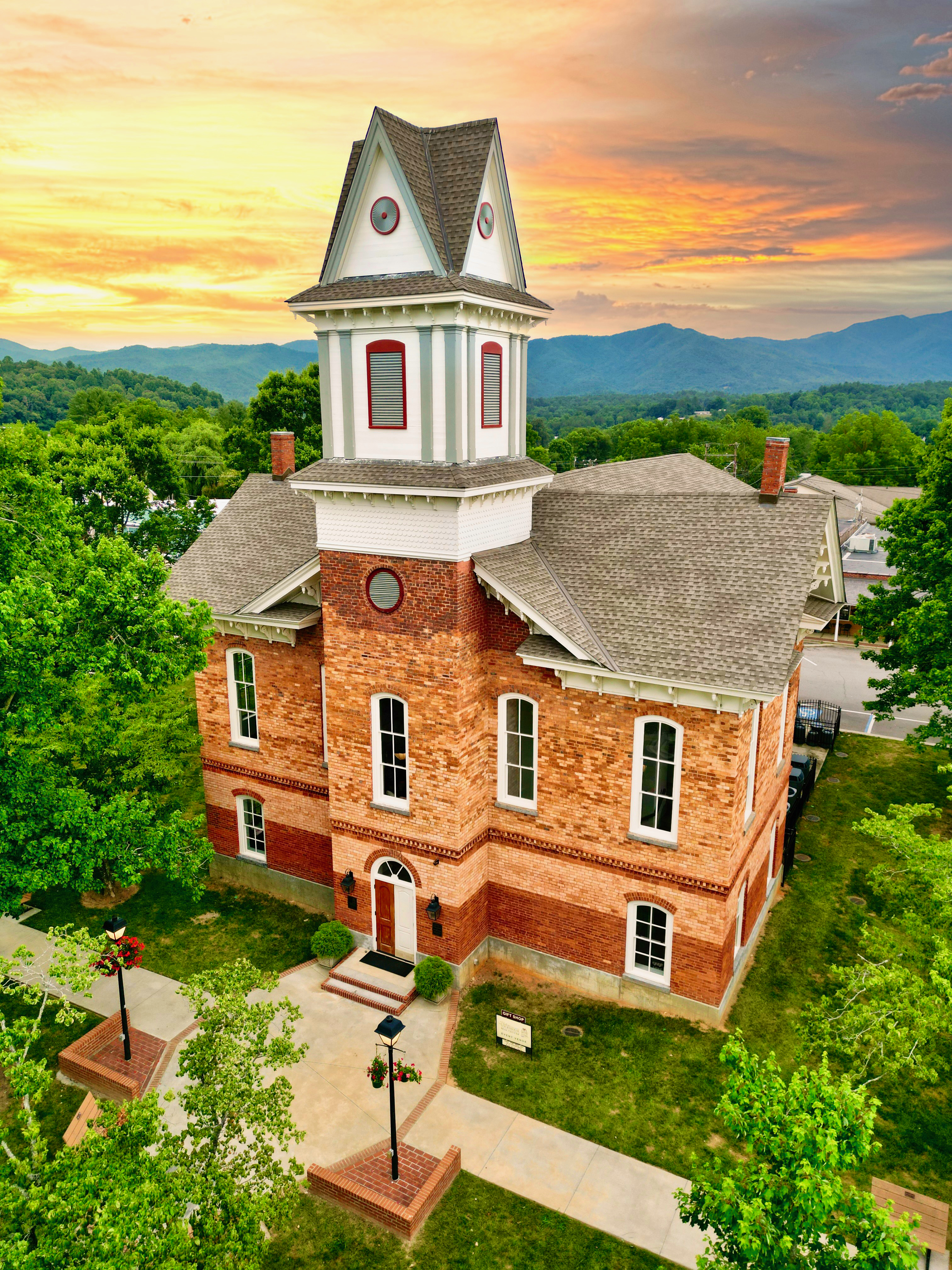
Former Clay County Courthouse in Hayesville

=== Early inhabitants ===
The area that became Clay County has long been occupied by indigenous people. An earthwork platform mound was built around 1000 AD in modern-day Hayesville, likely by people of the South Appalachian Mississippian culture as the center of their village. The Cherokee Native Americans later constructed a town known as Quanassee at the site. Quanassee had several hundred residents by 1550. In 1716, South Carolina officials met with Cherokee leaders at Quanassee to gain the Cherokee's alliance in the Yamassee War. The next year South Carolina built a trading site in Quanassee to provide English goods in exchange for Cherokee commodities like deerskins. A Coosa (Creek) war party "cut off" Quanassee in 1725, wrecking the village and enslaving or killing most of its residents. The village was briefly reestablished before the American Revolution; Rutherford expedition forces camped there in 1776.

The Unicoi Turnpike, a 1,000-year-old Native American trading route, ran through the site of Quanassee and modern-day Brasstown. In 1813, the trail was developed into a toll road from Tennessee to Georgia, creating the first highway through the area. Today Brasstown is the oldest continuous settlement in the county, having hosted residents since the establishment of the toll road.

The land which would become Clay County was claimed by Buncombe County in 1791, Haywood County by 1810, and Macon County in 1828. In the 1820s, Baptist missionaries visited Quanassee to preach to families living there. The first white settlers moved into what would become Clay County in the early 1830s. Migrants into the area were primarily of Scots-Irish descent, who had moved into the backcountry of the Appalachians from eastern areas. They moved south from Pennsylvania and Virginia after the American Revolution. Most became yeomen farmers and few owned slaves in the antebellum years. The first school in the area began operation in 1834. It was a tuition-based academy started by Leonard Butterfield on a farm near Hyatt's Creek. From 1836–1838, the state of North Carolina surveyed and subdivided land in the area to be sold. The parcels were put on public sale in Franklin in fall 1838.

In October 1837, Tennessee militia established Fort Hembree at present-day Hayesville to prepare for deporting the Cherokee people. Approximately 1,000 Cherokee were held prisoner there and removed from the area. The U.S. Military abandoned Fort Hembree in June 1838. In 1839, most of the area became part of Cherokee County, which was formed from western Macon County. Clay County's oldest remaining church, Hayesville Presbyterian Church, was built in 1848. Three Clay County structures from the 1800s (Shooting Creek's John Davis cabin, Warne's Ingram Mule Barn, and Tusquittee's Abner Moore House) are now on display at the Foxfire Museum and Heritage Center in Mountain City, Georgia.

=== County formation ===
In the fall of 1860, George Hayes, who was running for state representative from Cherokee County, promised his constituents to introduce legislation to organize a new county in the region. That would bring business associated with a new county seat, and make government accessible to more people. In February 1861 the legislation was introduced and passed by the North Carolina General Assembly. Clay County was formed primarily from Cherokee County, however a small area was taken from Macon County; it was named for statesman Henry Clay, former Secretary of State and member of the United States Senate from Kentucky. In honor of Mr. Hayes, the legislature designated the new county seat as Hayesville. The town was incorporated on March 12, 1913.

In 1860 Fort Hembree was reactivated to train soldiers for the Civil War. Early county trials and the first county commissioners’ meetings were held at the fort. It also contained a general store. Given the interruption of the war, Clay County lacked an organized, formal government until 1868. The small town of Hayesville became county seat mainly because whiskey was too easily available at Fort Hembree. Hicksville Academy, which became Hayesville High School (today the county's only public high school), was founded in 1870. In the 1890s it was bought by Duke University and offered college courses.

After the initial wood-frame county courthouse was destroyed by arson in 1870, the brick courthouse was constructed in 1888. It has been listed on the National Register of Historic Places. In mid-2007, courthouse operations moved to a new complex built 1 mile (1.6 km) west of the town square.

The first post office to open in what became Clay County began service January 8, 1844, at Fort Hembree. At its peak, Clay County boasted 17 post offices. By 1976 there were only three remaining, in Hayesville, Warne, and Brasstown.

Clay County’s borders have expanded twice since its formation. In 1872, the county annexed Buck Creek and Black Mountain from Macon County. In 1874, the county added a part of the Brasstown Creek area extending to the Georgia state line.

In the late 1870s and early 1880s the Tusquittee Turnpike toll road operated from Clay County to the Nantahala River in Macon County. Tiger’s Store is thought to be the oldest continuously operating business in Clay County. It was established around 1899 in Shooting Creek and moved to Hayesville around 1908. A ruby from Clay County is part of the Crown Jewels of the United Kingdom.

=== 20th century to present ===
Clay County’s two-story brick jail was built in 1912 to replace a log building. In 1972, shop class students from Hayesville High School constructed a replacement prison in downtown Hayesville. That was in use until 2008 when a new $4.3 million detention center opened at the judicial complex site. Today the brick jail is home to the Clay County Historical & Arts Museum.

Clay County's first official bank opened on May 18, 1910. A creamery opened in Brasstown in 1924. Mission Dam was constructed on the western end of the county in 1924. Gold mines operated in Tusquittee, Warne and Brasstown around the 1930s. In the 1940s and 50s, Clay County’s largest employers were band saw lumber mills. One of the county’s only manufacturing companies, Lidseen of North Carolina, Inc., has operated a metal fabrication plant in Warne since 1957. Another manufacturing plant, American Components Incorporated, made a metal film resistor for the Saturn V rocket that carried Neil Armstrong to the moon. Clay County has also manufactured ladies’ dresses, items for combat soldiers, and kitchen and bathroom fixtures.

The county’s first electric power came from a small dam across Shooting Creek near the Elf community in January 1920. The Blue Ridge Electric Association of Young Harris, Georgia, took over providing electricity for all of Clay County in 1939. By 1950, every community in the county had electricity.

The first automobile came to Clay County in 1914. From the early 1900s until the 1930s, every male citizen of Clay County between the ages of 18 and 45 was required to work five days per year without pay to help maintain public roads. Construction on US 64 between Hayesville, Warne, and Brasstown started in 1921. In 1959 a new highway was built from Hayesville through Sweetwater to Peachtree to provide Clay County residents with faster access to Andrews' new District Memorial Hospital. The US 64 moniker moved to this new route and the former route became Old Hwy. 64. US 64 connected Hayesville to Franklin in the early 1930s. NC 69 was built between Hayesville and Georgia in 1922. The entire road had to be relocated when Chatuge Lake was created twenty years later.

In October 1920, Clay County’s first and only railroad line, the Peavine, was completed between Hayesville and Andrews, where it connected with the Southern Railway. Cherokee and Clay counties each contributed $75,000 toward its construction. The Peavine hauled mainly lumber, but also kaolin mined in Clay County. The line was dismantled in 1951.

A silent film theater opened in the county in the 1920s. A movie theater later operated in Hayesville from the 1940s to the 1960s. The county has not had a movie theater since. Clay County's public library was established by the 1930s. It began in a two-story building on Hayesville's town square and at some point moved to a small room in the courthouse. In 1940 it became part of Nantahala Regional Library system. Its first librarian, Ellen Scroggs, was hired in 1943. A new $80,000 library building opened downtown on June 25, 1967. It was named in honor of local-born Dr. Fred A. Moss, who gave $10,000 towards its construction and donated books. Today Moss Memorial Library is the only public library in Clay County. In the 1940s Clay County became a "dry" county. The county banned alcohol sales until August 2009.

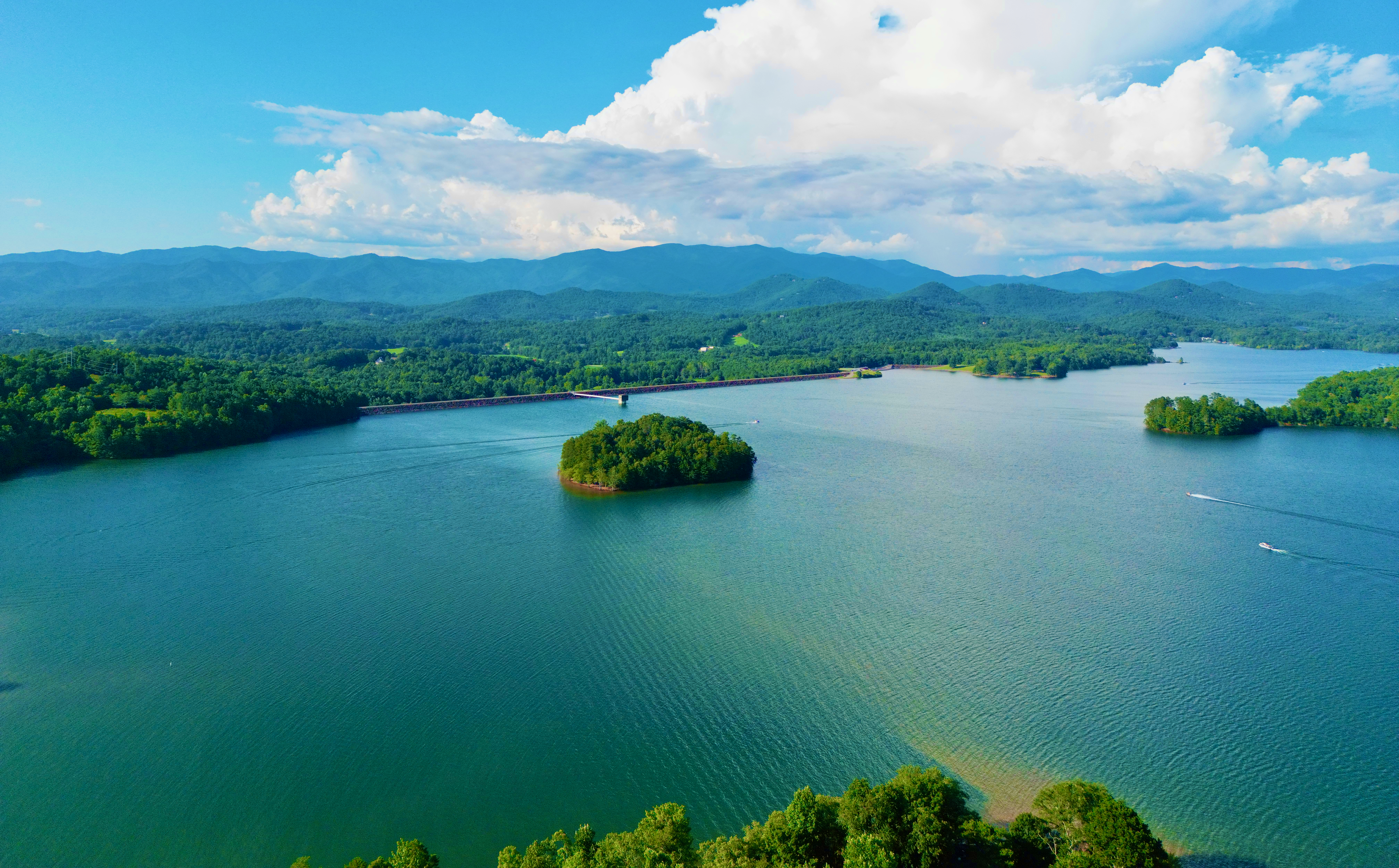
Lake Chatuge was created in 1942

Chatuge Dam was constructed near Hayesville in the early 1940s by the Tennessee Valley Authority, creating Chatuge Lake. At the time, Chatuge Dam was the highest earthen dam in the world until the Aswan Dam was constructed in Egypt in 1964. The dam was listed on the National Register of Historic Places in 2017.

In the 1950s, Clay County's official song was written. Willie Forrest Standridge wrote "Clay County Song" to the tune of Onward Christian Soldiers. The county's oldest nonprofit, Hinton Rural Life Center, began in 1957. A mission retreat operated by the United Methodist Church, it serves churches across nine southeastern states and is named for benefactor Harold H. Hinton. The Clay County Rescue Squad was organized in 1964. The county's first golf course opened in 1970. The Clay County Historical & Arts Council was founded February 6, 1974. The Peacock Performing Arts Center, the only community theatre in far-west North Carolina, opened in Hayesville in 1986. The Clay County Chamber of Commerce began in 1986. Clay County's building inspections department started in 1987. The famed New Year's Eve "Possum Drop" was held annually in Brasstown between 1990 and 2018. The Clay County Food Pantry was founded in 1992. The Clay County Recreation Center was built in Hayesville in 2007 and expanded in 2013. In 2025, Amazon built a distribution center and warehouse in the county. The biggest known drug bust in Clay County history (involving mainly fentanyl and cocaine) occurred in March 2025. In the mid-2020s, Clay County was among the first counties in North Carolina to ban development of crypto mining facilities and AI data centers.

Since the nineteenth century, Clay County has remained largely agricultural. Given its relative isolation, in the 21st century, residents continue to be overwhelmingly of European-American ancestry.

== Geography ==
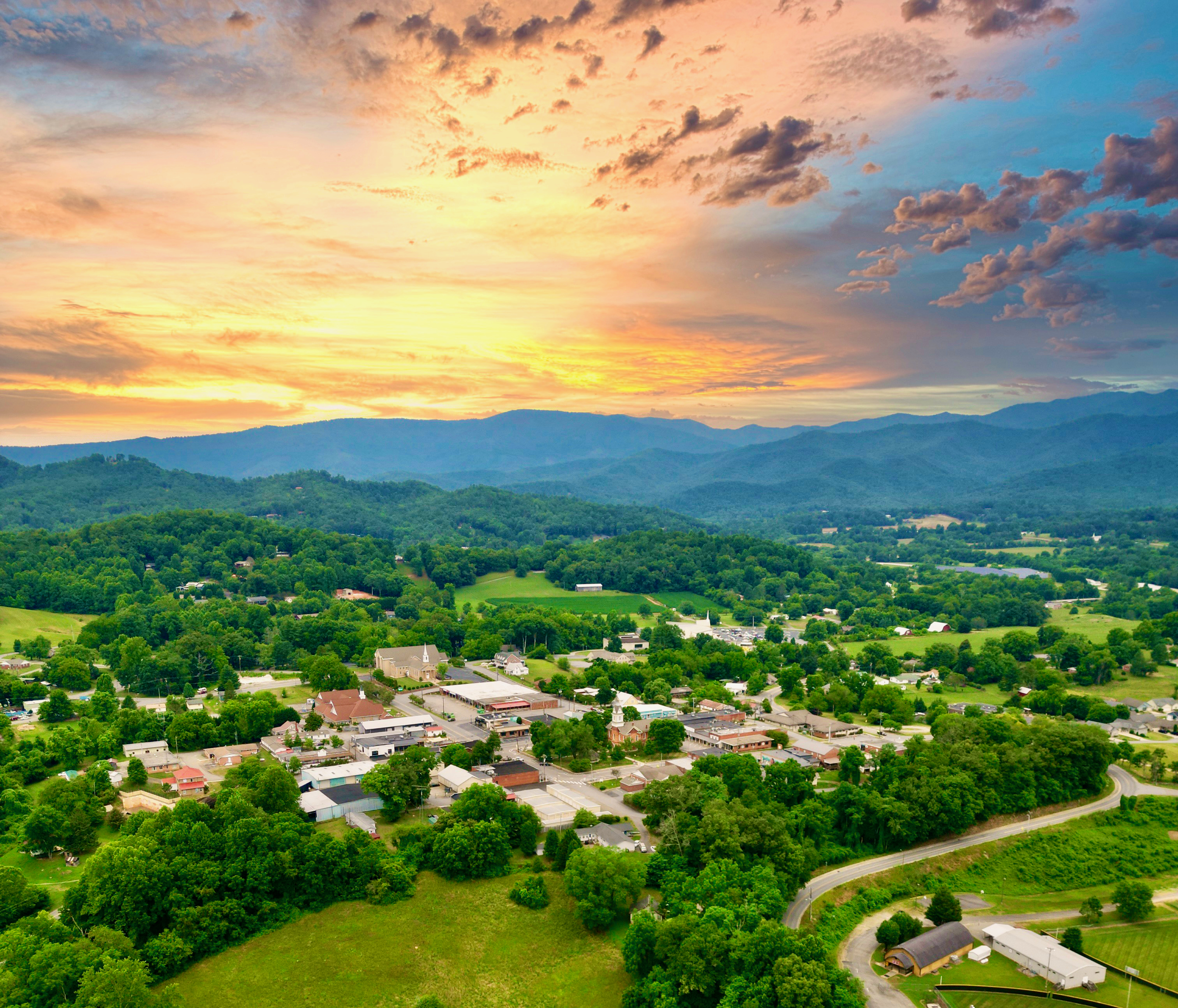
Downtown Hayesville from the air

According to the U.S. Census Bureau, the county has a total area of 220.78 square miles (571.8 km^{2}), of which 214.98 square miles (556.8 km^{2}) is land and 5.80 square miles (15.0 km^{2}) (2.63%) is water. It is the third-smallest county in North Carolina by land area and smallest by total area.

Clay County is bordered to the south by the state of Georgia and the Chattahoochee National Forest. The Nantahala River forms part of its northeastern border. The county is drained by the Hiwassee River. In the southern part of Clay County is Chatuge Lake, on the North Carolina–Georgia border. Much of Clay County exists within the Nantahala National Forest. Fires Creek Bear Reserve is north of the township of Tusquittee and offers multiple hiking trails. The Appalachian Trail winds through southeast Clay County. Clay County is home to five publicly-accessible waterfalls, the tallest of which are Clear Creek Falls and Lower Bald Spring Falls – each 35 feet (11 m) high. Bald Springs Falls has a total height of 100 feet (30 m) spread across multiple ledges.

Before 1941 the U.S. government purchased most of Clay County’s forest land to preserve it as National Forest Service property. The Forest Service oversees approximately 60 percent of Clay County’s land. Of Clay County's 136,096 acres, 110,096 are forested lands, including 65,934 in the eastern part of the county owned and maintained by the federal government as part of Nantahala National Forest. As of 2024, 14,515 acres are devoted to agriculture, with a total of 178 farms. Clay County has a total of 11 dams listed on the National Inventory of Dams; six are classified as high-hazard, meaning a dam failure may be deadly. In 2026, TVA released a map showing that approximately 360 structures in Clay County would be flooded if Chatuge Dam failed. Two-hundred of those buildings were in the Hayesville area.

=== Climate ===
Clay County has a humid subtropical climate, (Cfa) according to the Köppen classification, with hot, humid summers and mild, but occasionally cold winters by the standards of the southern United States.

Like the rest of the southeastern U.S., Clay County receives abundant rainfall, which is relatively evenly distributed throughout the year. Average annual rainfall is 55.9 inches (1,420 mm). Blizzards are rare but possible; one nicknamed the Storm of the Century hit the entire Eastern United States in March 1993.

=== National protected areas ===
- Appalachian Trail (part)
- Nantahala National Forest (part)

=== State and local protected areas ===
- Fires Creek Wildlife Management Area (part)
- JackRabbit Mountain Recreation Area
- Nantahala National Forest Game Land (part)

=== Major water bodies ===
- Buck Creek
- Chatuge Lake
- Crawford Creek
- Hiwassee River
- Little Tennessee River
- Nantahala River
- Park Creek
- Tusquitee Creek

=== Adjacent counties ===
- Cherokee County – northwest
- Macon County – east
- Union County, Georgia – southwest
- Towns County, Georgia – south
- Rabun County, Georgia – southeast
- Cherokee County – west

=== Major highways ===
- US 64
- US 64 Bus.
- NC 69
- NC 175

== Demographics ==
Historical population
Census	Pop.	Note	%±
1870	2,461		—
1880	3,316		34.7%
1890	4,197		26.6%
1900	4,532		8.0%
1910	3,909		−13.7%
1920	4,646		18.9%
1930	5,434		17.0%
1940	6,405		17.9%
1950	6,006		−6.2%
1960	5,526		−8.0%
1970	5,180		−6.3%
1980	6,619		27.8%
1990	7,155		8.1%
2000	8,775		22.6%
2010	10,587		20.6%
2020	11,089		4.7%
2025 (est.)	12,239	▲	10.4%
U.S. Decennial Census; 1790–1960 1900–1990; 1990–2000 2010 2020

As of 2024, Clay County has the third-oldest population of any county in North Carolina. The county's median age is 51.5, just behind Brunswick County and Cherokee County. The county's homeless population was 52 as of 2025. The county's jobless rate was 3.5 percent as of 2025.

Clay County has the fifth lowest gross domestic product in the state as of 2024. As of 2025, the county's median household income is $62,461, the median net worth is $244,790, and the county has 499 businesses.

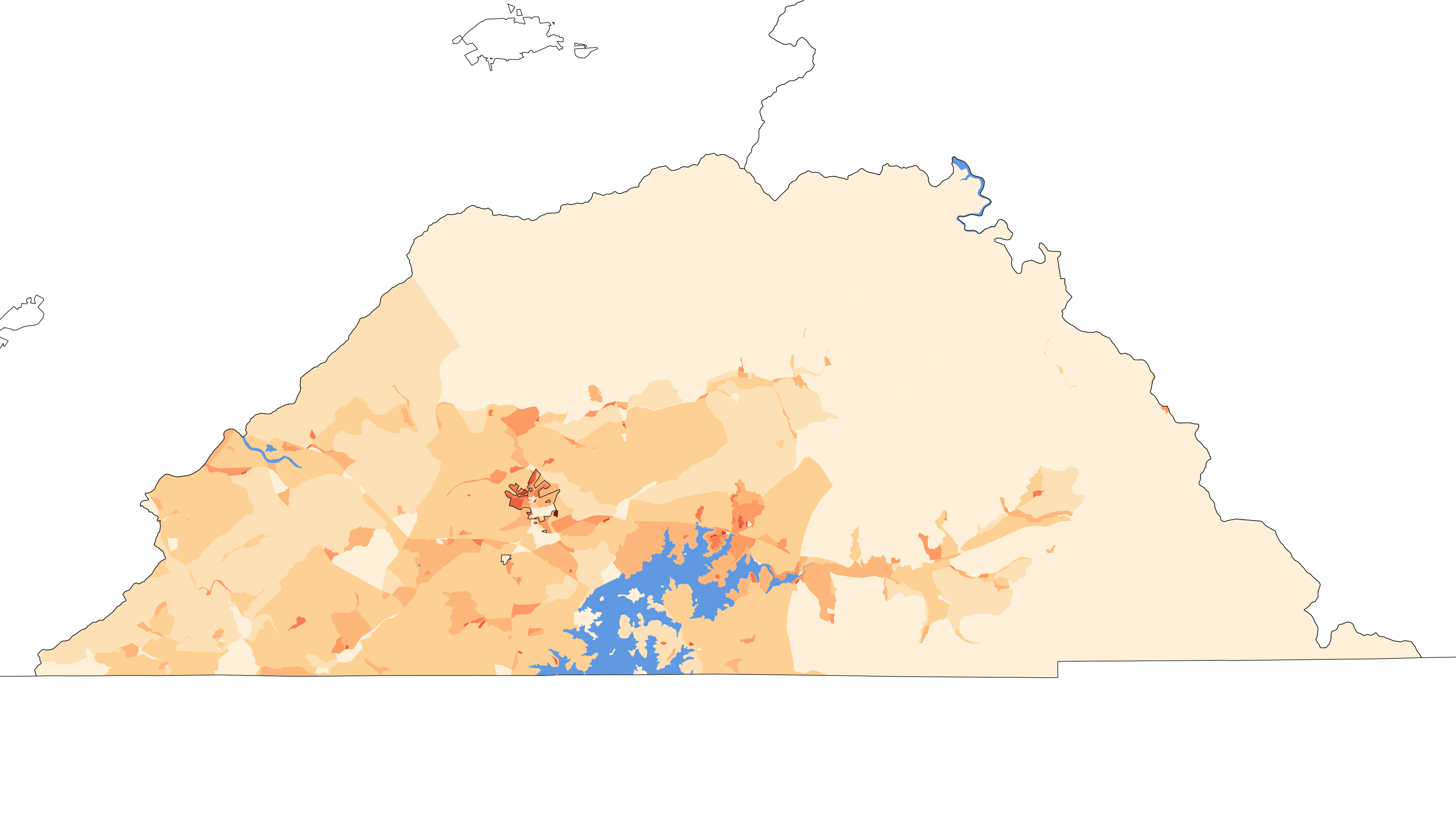
2020 population density of Clay County NC by census block

=== 2020 census ===
As of the 2020 census, there were 11,089 people, 4,996 households, and 3,424 families residing in the county. The median age was 55.3 years; 16.7% of residents were under the age of 18 and 33.3% of residents were 65 years of age or older. For every 100 females there were 96.3 males, and for every 100 females age 18 and over there were 93.0 males.

The racial makeup of the county was 91.5% White, 0.6% Black or African American, 0.4% American Indian and Alaska Native, 0.4% Asian, 0.1% Native Hawaiian and Pacific Islander, 1.6% from some other race, and 5.4% from two or more races. Hispanic or Latino residents of any race comprised 3.9% of the population.

<0.1% of residents lived in urban areas, while 100.0% lived in rural areas.

There were 4,880 households in the county, of which 20.2% had children under the age of 18 living in them. Of all households, 53.7% were married-couple households, 16.5% were households with a male householder and no spouse or partner present, and 24.9% were households with a female householder and no spouse or partner present. About 28.1% of all households were made up of individuals and 16.8% had someone living alone who was 65 years of age or older. There were 7,295 housing units, of which 33.1% were vacant. Among occupied housing units, 79.7% were owner-occupied and 20.3% were renter-occupied. The homeowner vacancy rate was 3.3% and the rental vacancy rate was 13.2%. The county's child poverty rate was 17.9%.

=== Racial and ethnic composition ===
Clay County, North Carolina – Racial and ethnic composition Note: the US Census treats Hispanic/Latino as an ethnic category. This table excludes Latinos from the racial categories and assigns them to a separate category. Hispanics/Latinos may be of any race.
Race / Ethnicity (NH = Non-Hispanic)	Pop 1980	Pop 1990	Pop 2000	Pop 2010	Pop 2020	% 1980	% 1990	% 2000	% 2010	% 2020
White alone (NH)	6,531	7,028	8,536	10,080	10,044	98.67%	98.23%	97.28%	95.21%	90.58%
Black or African American alone (NH)	34	41	70	64	60	0.51%	0.57%	0.80%	0.60%	0.54%
Native American or Alaska Native alone (NH)	10	39	27	32	44	0.15%	0.55%	0.31%	0.30%	0.40%
Asian alone (NH)	4	7	7	24	40	0.06%	0.10%	0.08%	0.23%	0.36%
Native Hawaiian or Pacific Islander alone (NH)	x	x	6	2	7	x	x	0.07%	0.02%	0.06%
Other race alone (NH)	2	0	8	0	23	0.03%	0.00%	0.09%	0.00%	0.21%
Mixed race or Multiracial (NH)	x	x	48	127	433	x	x	0.55%	1.20%	3.90%
Hispanic or Latino (any race)	38	40	73	258	438	0.57%	0.56%	0.83%	2.44%	3.95%
Total	6,619	7,155	8,775	10,587	11,089	100.00%	100.00%	100.00%	100.00%	100.00%

=== 2000 census ===
At the 2000 census, there were 8,775 people, 3,847 households, and 2,727 families residing in the county. The population density was 41 people per square mile (16 people/km^{2}). There were 5,425 housing units at an average density of 25 per square mile (9.7/km^{2}). The racial makeup of the county was 98.01% White, 0.80% Black or African American, 0.33% Native American, 0.09% Asian, 0.07% Pacific Islander, 0.15% from other races, and 0.56% from two or more races. 0.83% of the population were Hispanic or Latino of any race.

There were 3,847 households, out of which 23.50% had children under the age of 18 living with them, 59.80% were married couples living together, 7.50% had a female householder with no husband present, and 29.10% were non-families. 26.30% of all households were made up of individuals, and 14.40% had someone living alone who was 65 years of age or older. The average household size was 2.25 and the average family size was 2.68.

In the county, the population was spread out, with 18.60% under the age of 18, 6.20% from 18 to 24, 22.80% from 25 to 44, 29.80% from 45 to 64, and 22.70% who were 65 years of age or older. The median age was 47 years. For every 100 females there were 94.90 males. For every 100 females age 18 and over, there were 91.40 males.

The median income for a household in the county was $31,397, and the median income for a family was $38,264. Males had a median income of $29,677 versus $19,529 for females. The per capita income for the county was $18,221. About 7.80% of families and 11.40% of the population were below the poverty line, including 14.60% of those under age 18 and 13.00% of those age 65 or over.

== Law, government, and politics ==
=== Government ===
The Clay County government is a constitutional body and is granted specific powers by the Constitution of North Carolina, most of which are determined by the state's General Assembly. The county is governed by an elected five member four-year term Board of Commissioners. Clay County is a member of the regional Southwestern Commission Council of Governments. The county's annual operating budget is $29.4 million as of 2026. As of 2026, Clay County is tied for the third lowest tax rate in the state.

=== Politics ===
In the North Carolina Senate, Clay County is part of the 50th Senate district and is represented by Republican Jim Davis. In the North Carolina House of Representatives, Clay County is part of the 120th district, represented by Republican Kevin Corbin.

No Democratic presidential candidate has won Clay County since Jimmy Carter in 1976. Bill Clinton in 1996 was the last Democratic candidate to reach forty percent of the county's vote. Before the Progressive Era, Clay County was uniformly Democratic, but since Charles Evans Hughes became the first Republican to carry the county in 1916, it has voted for the GOP in all but five elections.

United States presidential election results for Clay County, North Carolina
Year	Republican		Democratic		Third party(ies)	
Year	No.	%	No.	%	No.	%
1912	17	2.19%	372	47.94%	387	49.87%
1916	453	53.11%	400	46.89%	0	0.00%
1920	911	54.68%	755	45.32%	0	0.00%
1924	1,090	52.89%	953	46.24%	18	0.87%
1928	1,106	55.05%	903	44.95%	0	0.00%
1932	1,265	48.39%	1,341	51.30%	8	0.31%
1936	1,525	53.23%	1,340	46.77%	0	0.00%
1940	1,176	46.57%	1,349	53.43%	0	0.00%
1944	1,263	50.36%	1,245	49.64%	0	0.00%
1948	1,213	47.11%	1,307	50.76%	55	2.14%
1952	1,443	50.07%	1,439	49.93%	0	0.00%
1956	1,442	52.84%	1,287	47.16%	0	0.00%
1960	1,657	56.73%	1,264	43.27%	0	0.00%
1964	1,286	46.88%	1,457	53.12%	0	0.00%
1968	1,390	54.94%	847	33.48%	293	11.58%
1972	1,545	65.19%	797	33.63%	28	1.18%
1976	1,428	47.41%	1,569	52.09%	15	0.50%
1980	2,136	60.22%	1,324	37.33%	87	2.45%
1984	2,259	62.42%	1,340	37.03%	20	0.55%
1988	2,174	62.47%	1,289	37.04%	17	0.49%
1992	1,890	47.73%	1,600	40.40%	470	11.87%
1996	1,769	48.40%	1,462	40.00%	424	11.60%
2000	2,416	62.72%	1,361	35.33%	75	1.95%
2004	3,209	65.95%	1,628	33.46%	29	0.60%
2008	3,707	66.88%	1,734	31.28%	102	1.84%
2012	3,973	70.42%	1,579	27.99%	90	1.60%
2016	4,437	73.83%	1,367	22.75%	206	3.43%
2020	5,112	74.16%	1,699	24.65%	82	1.19%
2024	5,761	74.55%	1,899	24.57%	68	0.88%

=== Law and public safety ===
The Clay County sheriff's office is the sole policing agency for the county. The sheriff protects the court and county owned facilities, manages the jail, and provides patrol and detective services. The Clay County K-9 Initiative was founded in 2024. The Clay County sheriff’s office employed 22 officers and 15 detention officers as of 2025. The department’s 2024-2025 budget is $3.77 million. The office fielded more than 8,000 service calls in 2024, including 212 motor vehicle accidents, 12 sexual assaults, and 59 calls for breaking and entering. The department conducted 728 vehicle stops that year. Clay County’s 46-bed detention center had 339 bookings in 2024. From May to June 2026, a severe staffing shortage forced inmates to be removed from the jail.

== Education ==
Clay County Schools serves all of the county with about 1,200 students attending a total of 4 separate schools, located on a central campus in Hayesville. After county government, Clay County Schools is the largest employer in the county with a staff of 205 people. Hayesville High School serves grades 9–12. Around seven percent, or $2.1 million of Clay County's annual budget, goes to the Clay County Board of Education as of 2025.

Higher education is offered nearby at Tri-County Community College, Young Harris College, and Western Carolina University.

The largest and oldest folk school in the United States, the John C. Campbell Folk School, is located in Brasstown, an unincorporated community that exists partly in Cherokee County and partly in Clay County. The school focuses on creative folk arts for all ages and offers community dance and concert entertainment.

== Media ==
The Clay County Progress is published weekly in Hayesville. It is the only newspaper in the county. Between 1902 and at least 1909 the community was served by the Clay County Courier newspaper. Between 1926 and 1943 the area was served by the Clay County News. The Progress was founded in 1951 and faced competition from weekly newspaper The Smoky Mountain Sentinel between 1987 and 2012.

== Communities ==
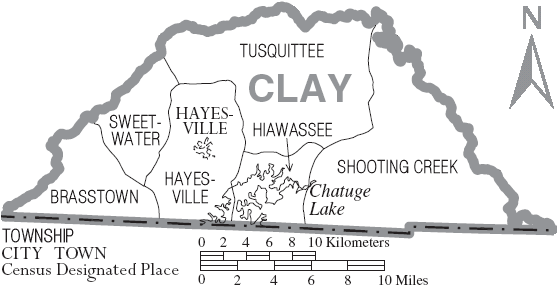
Map of Clay County with municipal and township labels

=== Town ===
- Hayesville (county seat and largest community)

=== Unincorporated communities ===
- Brasstown
- Elf
- Shooting Creek
- Tusquittee
- Warne

=== Townships ===
The county is divided into six townships:

- Brasstown comprises the westernmost township
- Hayesville is centrally located and home to the county seat
- Hiawassee, named after the major river in the region, is the smallest township, surrounding Chatuge Lake
- Shooting Creek is the easternmost township
- Sweetwater is a small township northwest of Hayesville
- Tusquittee is one of the larger townships and the most northern

== See also ==
- List of counties in North Carolina
- National Register of Historic Places listings in Clay County, North Carolina
- List of Highway Historical Markers in Clay County, North Carolina
- Upper Hiwassee Highlands AVA, wine region partially located in the county
