= Brasstown Township, Clay County, North Carolina =

Brasstown Township
- Township
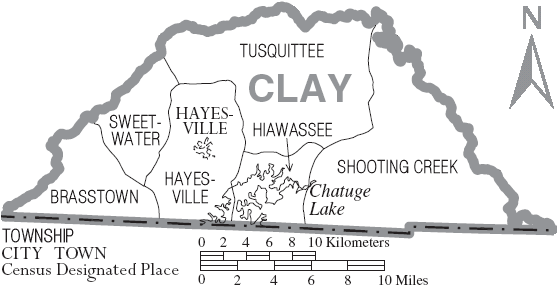
- Location in Clay County
- Coordinates: 35.03986°N 83.95839°W
- Country: United States
- State: North Carolina
- County: Clay

Area
  - Total: 24.0 sq mi (62 km^{2})
  - Land: 24.0 sq mi (62 km^{2})
  - Water: 0.0 sq mi (0 km^{2})
- Elevation: 1,070 ft (326 m)
- Area code: 828

Brasstown is one of the six township of Clay County, North Carolina, United States. It is the westernmost township in the county. The other five are Hayesville, Hiawassee, Shooting Creek, Sweetwater, and Tusquittee. By area, it is the third smallest township in Clay County.

== Geography ==
Brasstown has an elevation of 1,811.0 ft. (552.0 meters)

== Unincorporated communities ==
Brasstown is home to four unincorporated communities, Fires Creek, Warne, Shewbird, and a town of the same name, Brasstown.

== Churches and cemeteries ==
Brasstown is home to four cemeteries: Brasstown Cemetery, Fires Creek Cemetery, Hunt Cemetery, and Mcclure Cemetery.

Brasstown has 15 as of 2025: Bethesda Church, Brasstown Church, Copperhill Church, Fires Creek Church, Hayesville Church, Many Forks Church, Martin Hill Church, Mount Pisgah Church, Myers Chapel, New Hope Church, Ogden Church, Pine Grove Church, Shady Grove Church, Sweetwater Church, and Truett Memorial Church.

== Major highways ==
Highway 64
