= Shooting Creek Township, Clay County, North Carolina =

Township in Clay County, North Carolina

Coordinates: 35°01′55″N 83°38′56″W

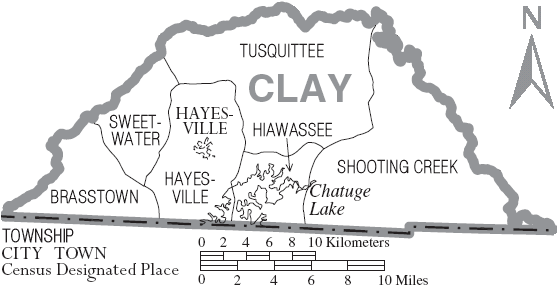
Map of Clay County, with municipal and township labels

Shooting Creek Township is a township and one of the six townships of Clay County, North Carolina, United States, and is the easternmost of the six. The other five are: Brasstown, Hayesville, Sweetwater, Hiawassee, and Tusquittee.

== History ==
The John Davis cabin erected in Shooting Creek before the Civil War is on display at the Foxfire Museum and Heritage Center in Mountain City, Georgia.
