= Fires Creek =

Recreational area in North Carolina, US

Fires Creek Wildlife Management
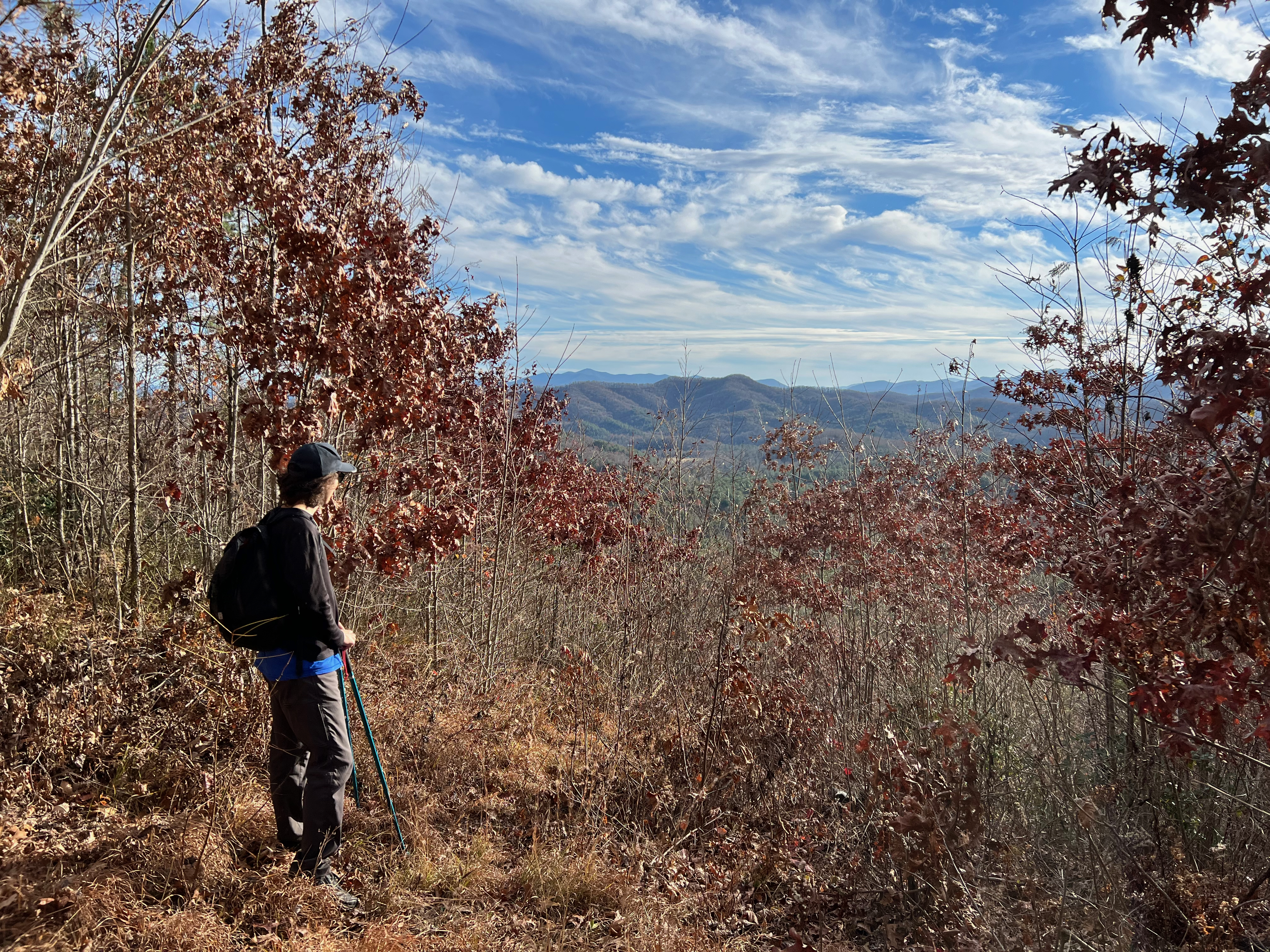
- A hiker takes in the view from a trail in the Fires Creek Recreation Area

- Location within North Carolina
- Nearest city: Andrews, North Carolina
- Coordinates: 35.132867°N 83.805176°W
- Governing body: Fires Creek Wildlife Management

Fires Creek is a recreational area located in the Nantahala National Forest in Clay County, North Carolina. It takes its name from Fires Creek, which runs through it. The creek was named for the first white settler who lived in the area. The area offers paved and unpaved hiking trails, swimming holes, camping spots, picnic tables, grills, scenic views, horseback riding, fishing. Fires Creek Recreation Area is an active bear sanctuary.

== Fires Creek Rim Trail ==
Fires Creek Rim Trail is a 23.4 mile hiking and horseback riding trail within Nantahala National Forest that travels around the rim of Fires Creek Wildlife Management Area and is marked with a blue blaze. It offers several side trail and access roads and is generally entered from the Fire's Creek Picnic Area along the trail to Leatherwood Falls. Upon reaching Leatherwood Falls, Fire's Creek Rim Trail travels right as it climbs to the ridge.

Trails and Peaks along Fires Creek Rim Trail include:

- Big Stamp (4,337') to Weatherman Bald (4,960') 5.4 miles, average hiking time 4 hrs
- Weatherman Bald to Tusquitee Bald (5,240') 1.9 miles, average hiking time 2.5 hrs
- Tusquitee Bald to Chestnut Stump Knob (4,400') 2.6 miles, average hiking time 3 hrs
- Chestnut Stump Knob to Carver Gap (2,996') 3.5 miles, average hiking time of 3.5 hrs
- Carver Gap to Hunter Camp (1,800') 3.75 miles, average hiking time of 2 hrs.
