= Tusquittee Township, Clay County, North Carolina =

Township in Clay County, North Carolina, U.S.

Coordinates: 35.0845°N 83.7266°W

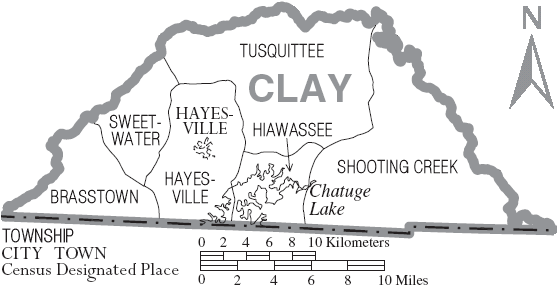
Map of Clay County, with municipal and township labels

Tusquittee Township is one of the six townships of Clay County, North Carolina, United States, and is the northernmost of the six. The other five are Brasstown; Hayesville, which contains the county seat of the same name; Sweetwater, Hiawassee, and Shooting Creek. The name is derived from the Cherokee people, who occupied this area as part of their homeland.
