= Chatuge Dam =

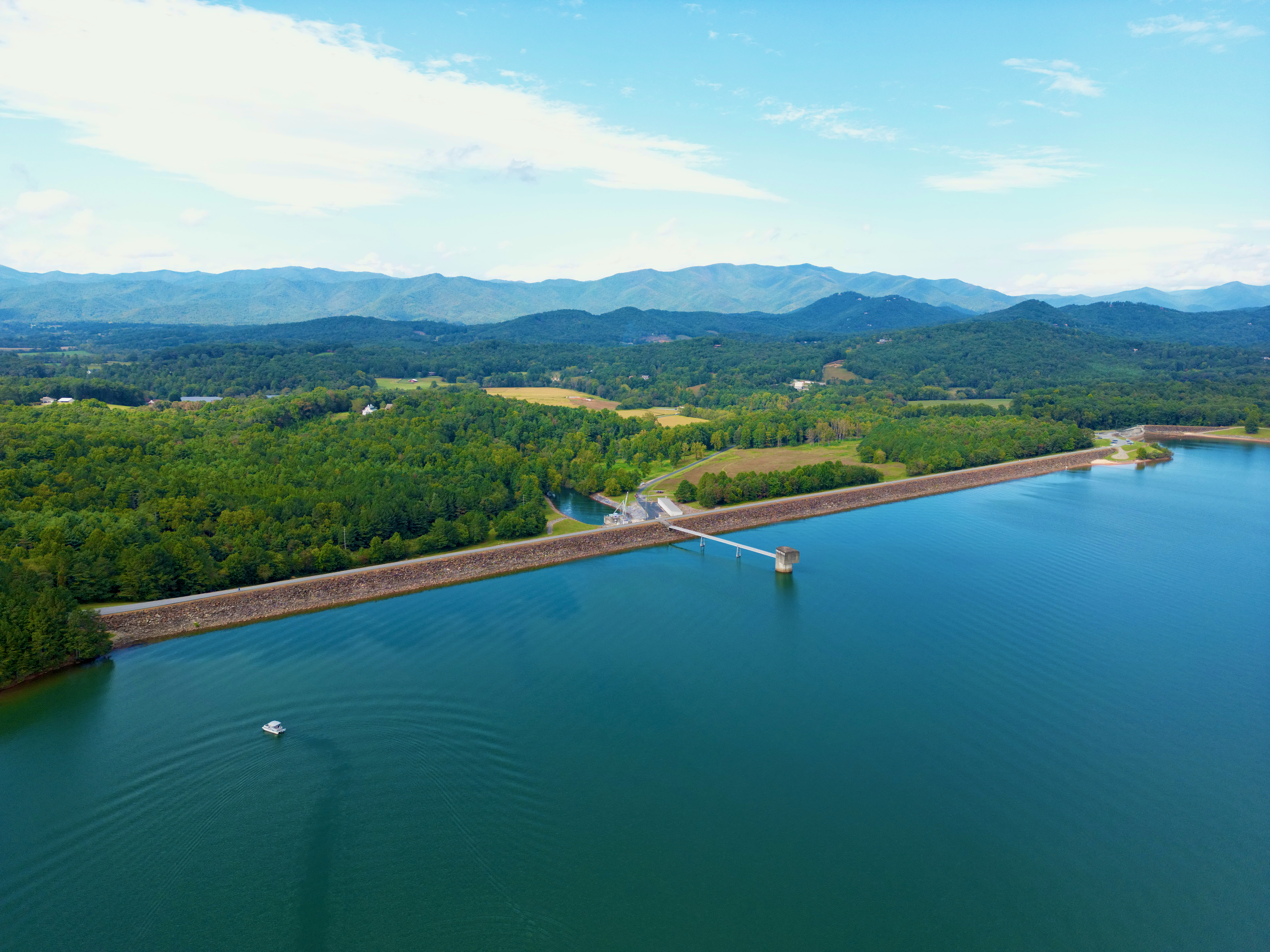
- Chatuge Dam contains Chatuge Reservoir
- Interactive map of Chatuge Dam
- Official name: Chatuge Dam
- Location: Clay County, North Carolina, U.S.
- Coordinates: 35°1′3″N 83°47′28″W
- Construction began: July 17, 1941
- Opening date: February 12, 1942
- Operator: Tennessee Valley Authority

Dam and spillways
- Impounds: Hiwassee River
- Height: 144 ft (44 m)
- Length: 2,850 ft (870 m)

Reservoir
- Creates: Chatuge Lake

Chatuge Dam is a flood control and hydroelectric dam on the Hiwassee River in Clay County, in the U.S. state of North Carolina. The dam is the uppermost of three dams on the river owned and operated by the Tennessee Valley Authority, which built the dam in the early 1940s for flood storage and to provide flow regulation at Hiwassee Dam further downstream. The dam impounds the 7,000-acre (2,800 ha) Chatuge Lake, which straddles the North Carolina-Georgia state line. While originally built solely for flood storage, a generator installed at Chatuge in the 1950s gives the dam a small hydroelectric output. At the time it was built, Chatuge Dam was the highest earthen dam in the world until the Aswan Dam was built in Egypt in 1964. The dam and associated infrastructure was listed on the National Register of Historic Places in 2017.

Chatuge Dam is named for an 18th-century Cherokee village once situated near the dam site. The dam is the easternmost TVA energy facility in North Carolina. The main dam has three saddle dams – one to the west (19 feet high and 300 feet long) and two to the east (27 feet high and 500 feet long; and 37 feet high and 320 feet long). Chatuge Dam and its three saddle dams are classified by the U.S. Army Corps of Engineers as high-hazard dams, meaning a dam failure may pose a deadly threat to nearby residents. All four dams' conditions are not made available to the public due to security concerns.

In early 2025, a TVA safety study showed that Chatuge Dam's spillway is at risk. Extremely heavy rain could erode the spillway by lifting its concrete slabs, ultimately breaching the reservoir. The spillway underwent temporary measures to improve its slab joints. TVA continues to study long-term solutions, including a new spillway next to the current one. In 2026, TVA released a map of flooding that would occur if the spillway were to fail. The map showed that more than 700 structures would be flooded, including about 360 in Clay County, 130 in nearby Cherokee County, and around 250 in East Tennessee.

== Location ==
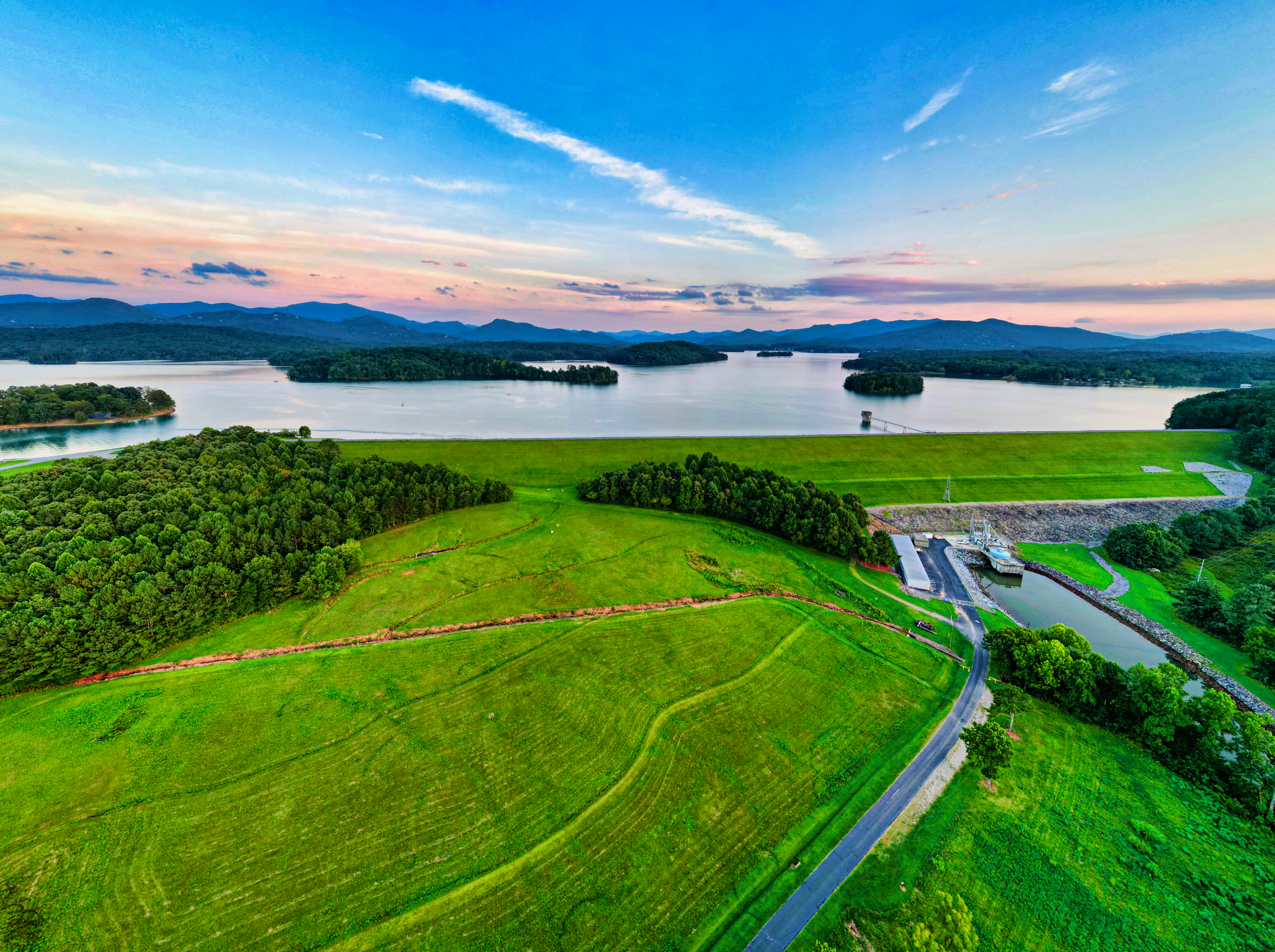
Chatuge Dam contains Chatuge Reservoir

Chatuge Dam is located 121 miles (195 km) above the mouth of the Hiwassee River, just north of the North Carolina-Georgia state line. Chatuge Lake extends southward for 13 miles (21 km) along the Hiwassee and eastward for roughly 6 miles (9.7 km) along Shooting Creek, which once emptied into the Hiwassee immediately upstream from the dam site. The dam and the North Carolina section of the reservoir are surrounded by the Nantahala National Forest, and the Georgia section of the reservoir is surrounded by the Chattahoochee National Forest. Hayesville, North Carolina (north of the dam) and Hiawassee, Georgia (to the south) are the nearest communities of note.

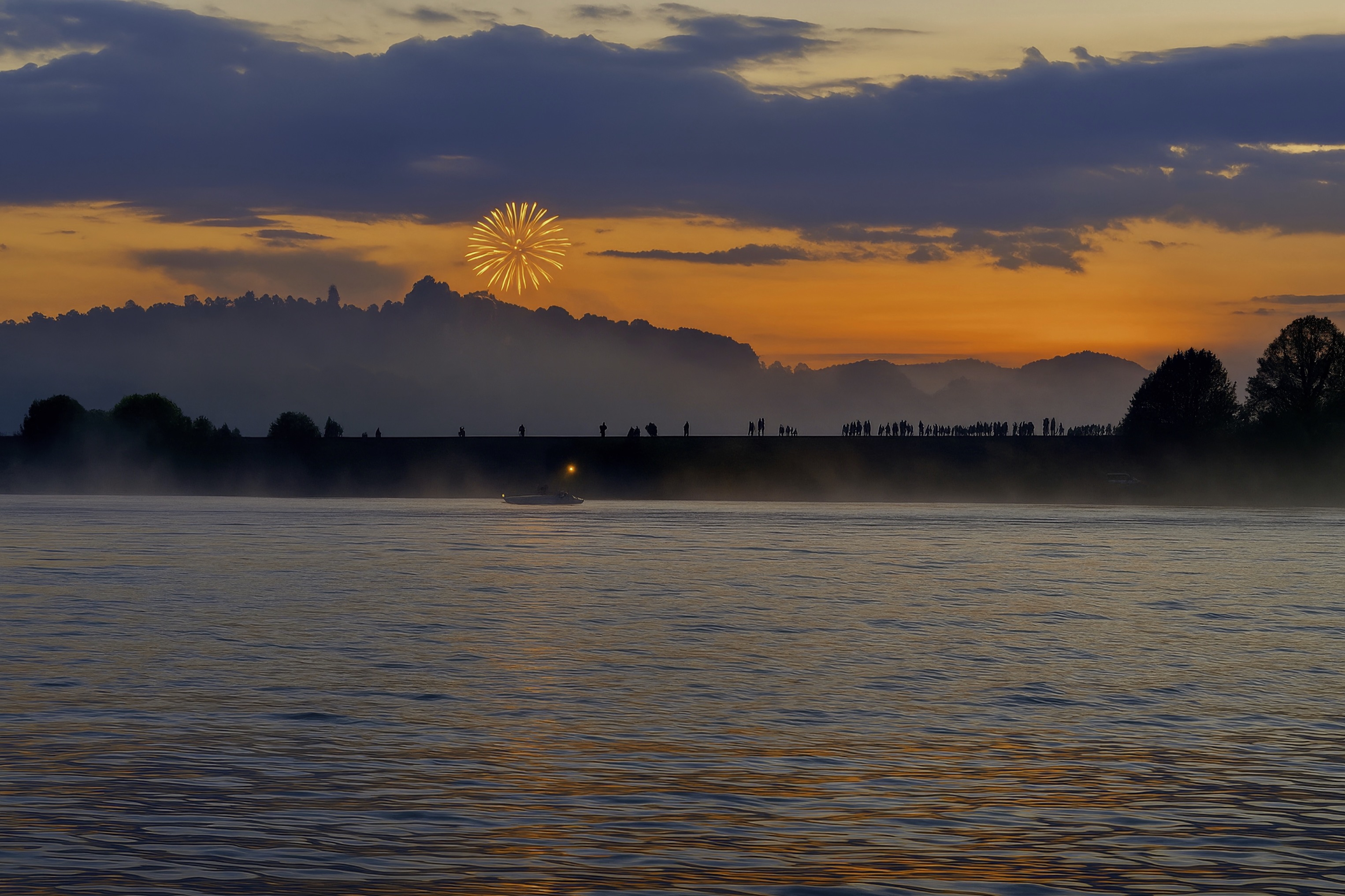
People stand on Chatuge Dam to watch fireworks on the Fourth of July

The dam also serves as a social gathering place for Clay County citizens. The county's annual Independence Day fireworks celebration is held at the dam, crossing the dam and back provides a one-mile walk, a relatively flat 3.5-mile paved walk extends from the dam to campgrounds and recreation areas, and Clay County Schools' cross country teams practice and hold meets at the dam.

== Capacity ==
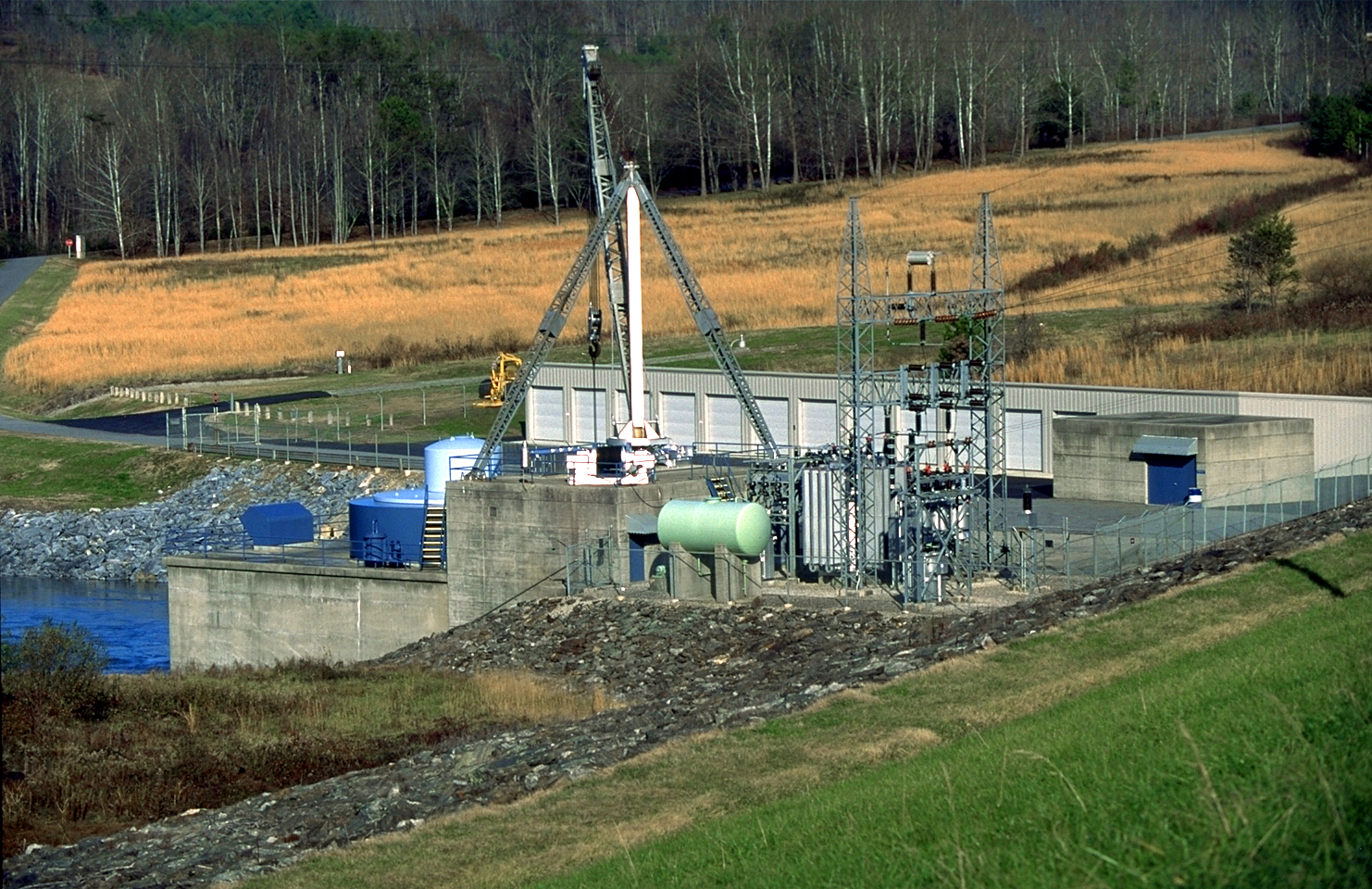
The power plant below Chatuge Dam

Chatuge Dam is an earth-and-rock dam 144 feet (44 m) high and 2,850 feet (870 m) long, and has a generating capacity of 10,000 kilowatts. The dam's concrete overflow "ski-jump" spillway consists of 50 bays with a combined discharge of 11,500 cubic feet per second (330 m^{3}/s). Chatuge Lake has a flood storage capacity of 62,619 acre-feet (77,239,000 m^{3}) and 132 miles (212 km) of shoreline.

Water passes Chatuge Dam via the dam's intake tower (connected to the dam by a footbridge), from which a steel conduit carries the water under the dam and empties it downstream.

== Background and construction ==
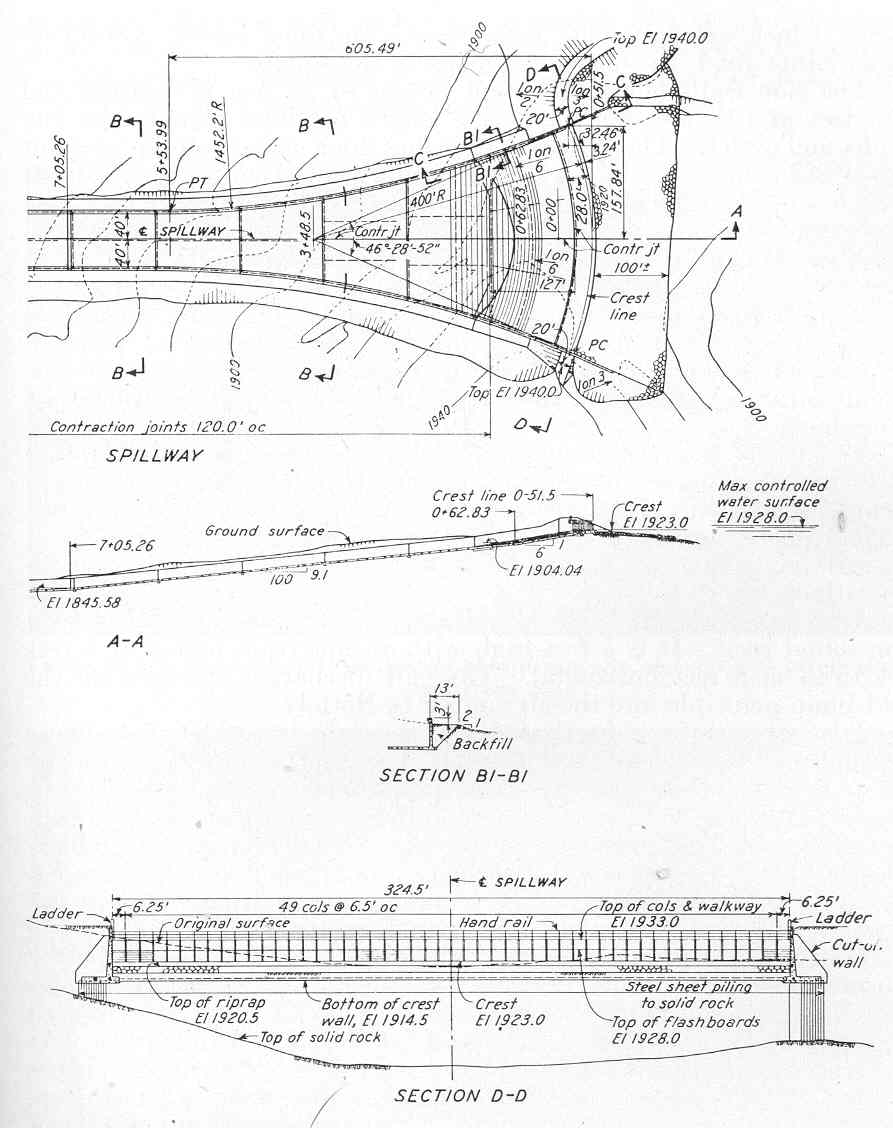
TVA's design plan for Chatuge Dam, circa 1941

Various private entities recognized the hydroelectric potential of the Hiwassee in the early 1900s, although plans for dams were typically focused further downstream from the Chatuge site. TVA had considered an alternate site two miles downstream at Blair Creek. After taking control of flood control operations in the valley in the 1930s, the Tennessee Valley Authority built Hiwassee Dam and carried out an extensive survey of the river (the waters of which were a major contributor to flooding in Chattanooga) in which they identified the Chatuge site. The outbreak of World War II in Europe brought an emergency demand for electricity, mainly to power aluminum production in East Tennessee, and TVA offered to meet this demand by building a series of dams on the Hiwassee and several other Tennessee River tributaries. The Chatuge Dam project (originally called the Hayesville project), along with several other dam projects, was authorized by the United States Congress on July 16, 1941. Work on the dam began the following day.

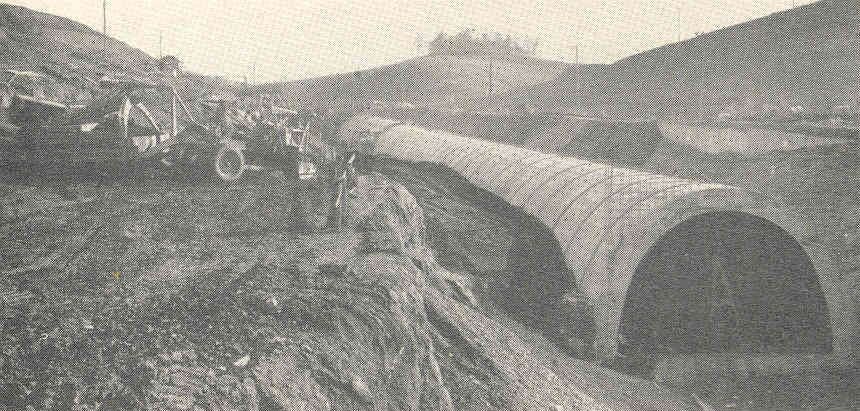
Workers building the concrete culvert for Chatuge's conduit

The construction of Chatuge Dam and its reservoir required the purchase of 11,641 acres (4,711 ha) of land, 1,904 acres (771 ha) of which had to be cleared. 278 families, 532 graves, and 40 miles (64 km) of roads (including part of U.S. Route 64 and all of NC 69) had to be relocated. One house relocated from the Elf community during the clearing of the land later became the Clay County School District superintendent’s office until 2005. TVA kept the dam's design simple and relied on basic building materials (i.e., earth and rock) in order to complete the dam as quickly as possible in hopes of allowing the reservoir to collect the 1941-1942 winter rains. The dam was constructed of impervious earthen fill fortified on both sides by riprap. The spillway was the only major part of the dam that required concrete. Since the reservoir would fill slowly and create mosquito-breeding environments, various measures were taken to prevent malaria outbreaks.

Chatuge Dam was completed and its gates closed on February 12, 1942. The cost of the whole project was just over $9 million. Construction took 1.5 million man-hours to complete. One worker died during the construction after falling from a railroad car at the station while unloading cement for the dam. For most of its early years, Chatuge was operated as a flood storage unit in conjunction with nearby Nottely Dam (which has an almost identical design) to regulate water flow at Hiwassee Dam 45 miles (72 km) downstream. In 1954, the saddle dams and main dam were raised ten feet and flash boards were installed on the spillway so the lake could rise an additional 4 feet (1.2 m). A small generator was also installed at Chatuge in 1954. In 1985, TVA spent $3 million to raise Chatuge Dam by six feet in order to accommodate higher rainfall.
