= Hinton Rural Life Center =

Mission retreat operated by the United Methodist Church

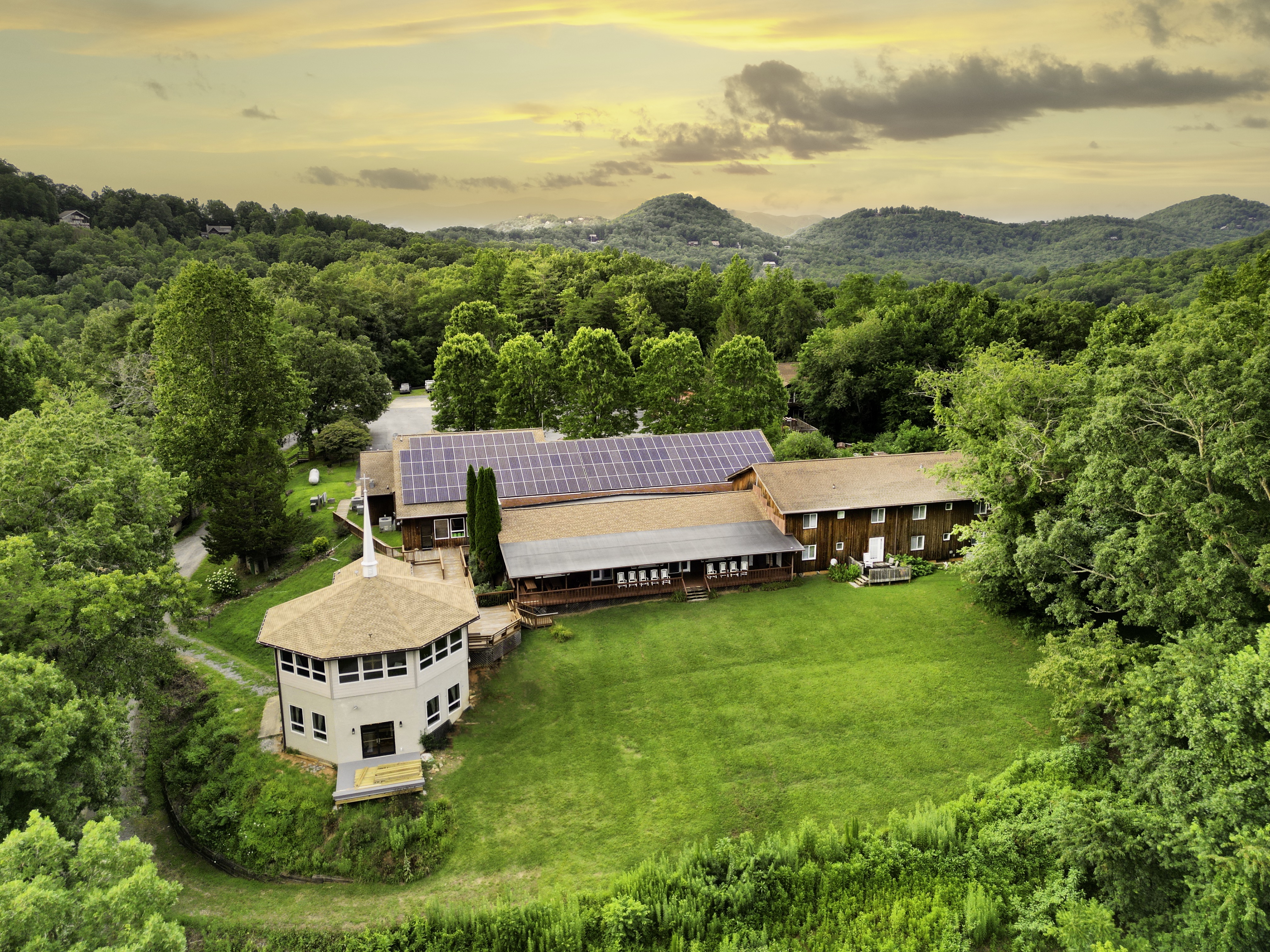
The main lodge and chapel at the Hinton Center

Hinton Rural Life Center, also known as the Hinton Center, is a mission retreat in the United States operated by the United Methodist Church. It serves churches across nine southeastern states. It is located on a mountain in Hayesville, North Carolina, and overlooks Lake Chatuge, the highest lake in the state of Georgia.

The Hinton Center is the oldest nonprofit organization in Clay County.

== History ==
Harold Hopkins Hinton was born December 31, 1884, in Social Circle, Georgia, and grew up in Athens, Georgia. He attended Asheville Military School and North Georgia College in Dahlonega. Hinton’s summer home was in western North Carolina. He began building the center in Clay County as a hotel but fell ill and was unable to complete construction. He died on October 29, 1956.

Velma and J. Walter Moore met with pastor H. Claude Young, Jr. about purchasing the land and unfinished building for community ministry. They bought the land and Hinton's widow, Alice Lanier Hinton, provided funding to complete the building. The Hinton Memorial Rural Life Center opened in 1957 with a focus on retreat ministry and community outreach. It was incorporated as a non-profit of the Southeastern Jurisdiction of the Methodist Church on June 7, 1961. The center’s first executive director was Harold McSwain.

In the early 1960s, groups visiting the center were charged $6 per day for three meals and overnight lodging. In 1970, the center purchased lakefront land and its property grew to 10 acres by 1973. In the late 1970s, the center constructed Lakehouse, Staff Cottage, and Sells Cottage. Ten years later, in the late 1980s, Patterson Cottage and the Gentry Office Building were built. The lodge was remodeled in 1990 and the Hinton Center built its first new home with the help of community volunteers. Over the following decade, volunteers built 20 new homes.

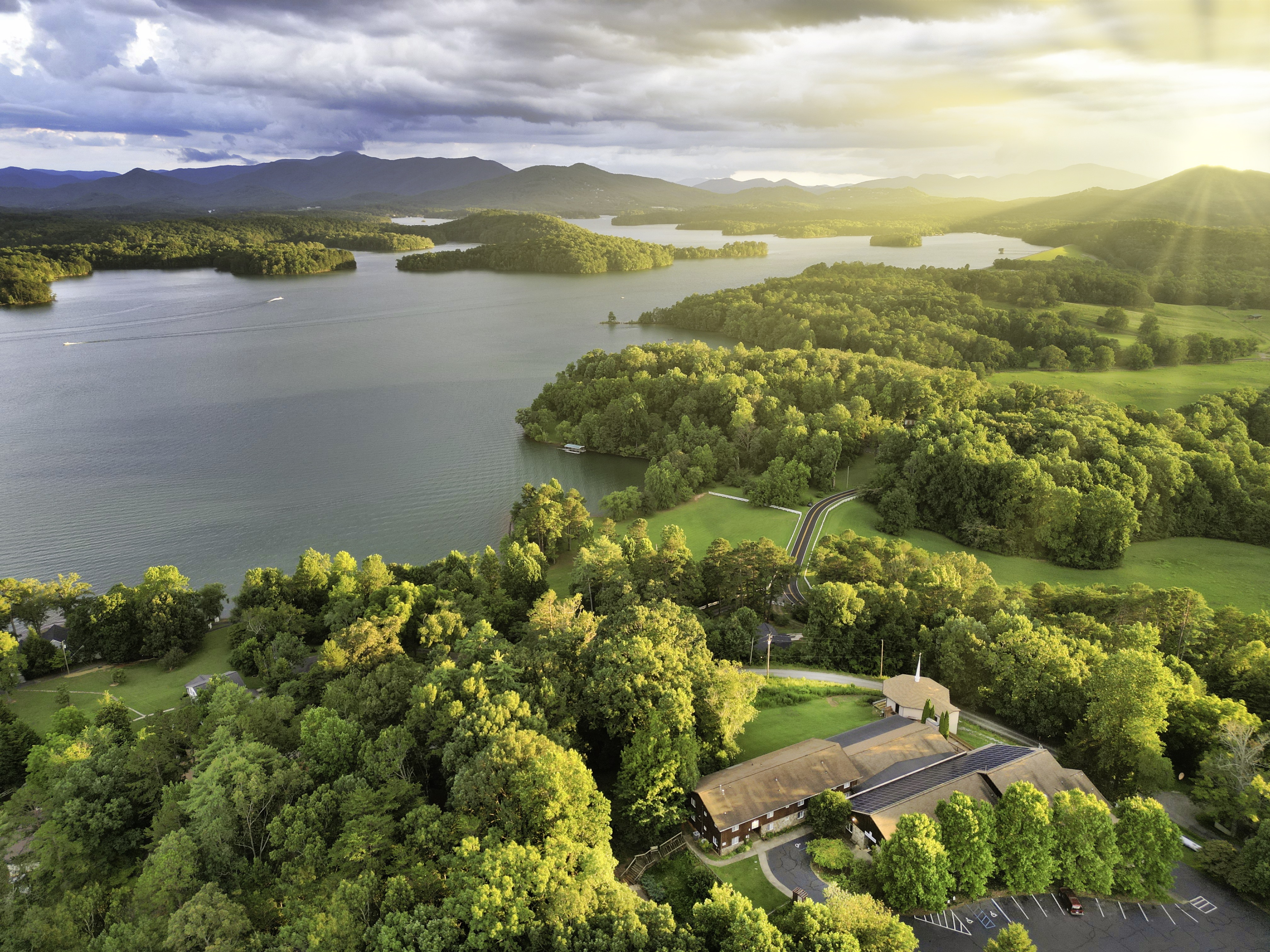
Hinton Rural Life Center overlooks Lake Chatuge

In the early 1990s, dining and commons rooms were added to the lodge and a tool building was built. Dysart Chapel was completed in 1996. Around 2000, Hinton Center had a total of 33 acres and built four hermitages. The center partnered with USDA Rural Development to keep building new homes.

In the mid 2000s, Hinton acquired the McCall House and built the Joe Ervin, Nadine Johnson, and Young Commons buildings. During the 2016 western North Carolina wildfires, dozens of firefighters from around the nation stayed at Hinton Center. A lakeside pavilion and worship center opened in 2018. As of 2025, the Hinton Center also hosts private events like weddings and family reunions for groups of up to 200 people. In 2024, a new Educational Tool Barn was constructed. The Hinton Center had 13,499 volunteers contribute 243,000 service hours – an estimated $6.5 million in volunteer labor – from 2014 through 2025. In 2025 and 2026, the Hinton Center was named Organization of the Year by the Clay County Chamber of Commerce.
