= Hayesville Township, Clay County, North Carolina =

Township in Clay County, North Carolina, U.S.

Coordinates: 35°02′27″N 83°49′35″W

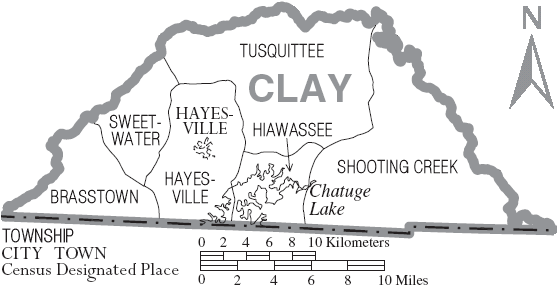
Map of Clay County, North Carolina with municipal and township labels

Hayesville is one of the six townships of Clay County, North Carolina, United States. The other five are Brasstown, Hiawassee, Shooting Creek, Sweetwater, and Tusquittee.

== Cities and towns ==
Hayesville is home to the county seat, Hayesville, the town of the same name.
