= Sweetwater Township, Clay County, North Carolina =

Township in Clay County, North Carolina, U.S.

Coordinates: 35.0674898°N 83.8816003°W

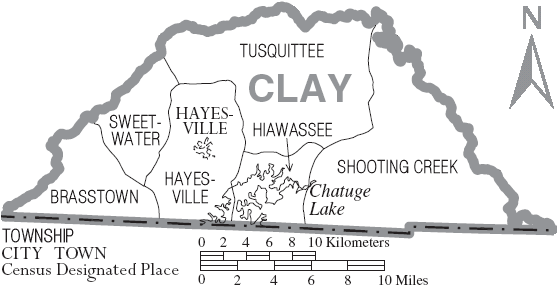
Map of Clay County, with municipal and township labels

Sweetwater Township is one of the six townships of Clay County, North Carolina, United States, located in the northwestern part of the county. The other five are Brasstown, Hayesville, Shooting Creek, Hiawassee, and Tusquittee.
