= Chatuge Lake =

American water reservoir on the North-Carolina–Georgia border

Lake Chatuge
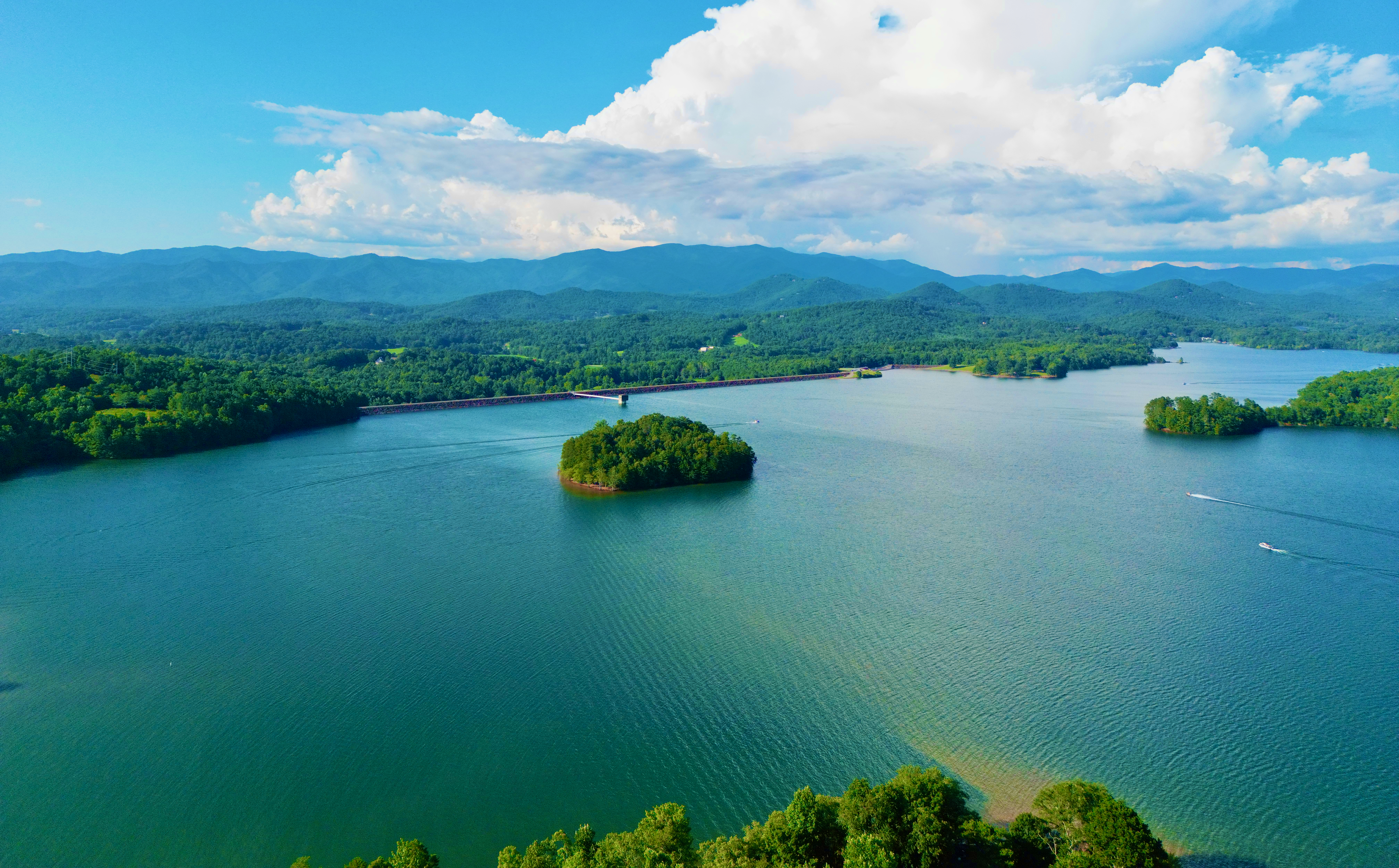
- Lake Chatuge reservoir on August 3, 2022

- Location within Georgia Location within the United States
- Location: United States
- Coordinates: 34°59′28″N 83°47′06″W
- Surface area: 10.9 sq mi (28 km^{2})
- Average depth: 9.1 m (30 ft)
- Max. depth: 44 m (144 ft) at dam
- Water volume: 62,619 m^{3} (2,211,400 cu ft) maximum
- Shore length^{1}: 132 mi (212 km)
- Surface elevation: 1,926 ft (587 m)
- Settlements: Hayesville, Hiawassee,
- ^{1} Shore length is not a well-defined measure.

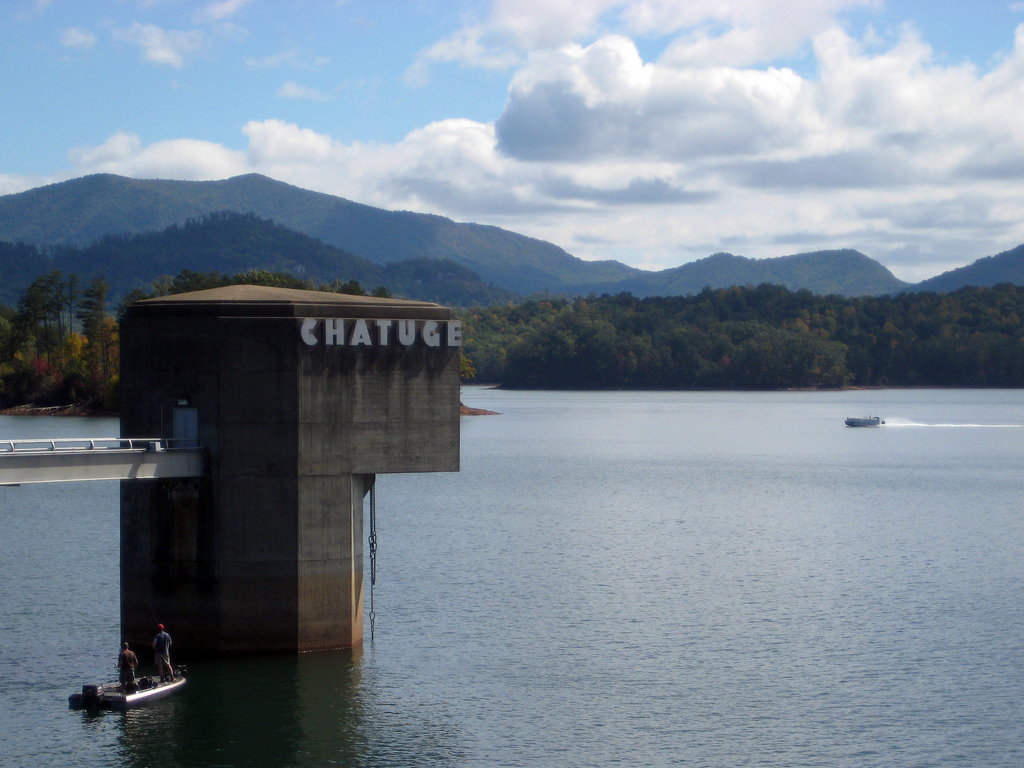
Fisherman on a summer day in 2011 at Lake Chatuge, an artificial reservoir between North Carolina and Georgia

Lake Chatuge is a man-made reservoir in Towns County, Georgia, and Clay County, North Carolina. It was formed by the Tennessee Valley Authority's construction of Chatuge Dam (then the highest earthen dam in the world) in 1942. The lake is relatively shallow with depths of 30 feet (9.1 m) and reaches 144 feet (44 m) by the dam. In an average year the water level varies 10 feet (3.0 m) from winter to summer to provide seasonal flood storage. Lake Chatuge is the highest major lake in the state of Georgia. It takes up 7,000 acres (2,800 ha) and is 13 miles (21 km) long.

The lake is named after an 18th-century Cherokee Native American settlement once located near the dam site. The word means “Beautiful” and “Land where the waters meet” (the lake covers the meeting place of the Hiwassee River and Shooting Creek). The reservoir is home to 32 species of fish including rainbow trout, catfish, bass, crappie, walleye, blue gill and brim. Bass clubs hold tournaments on the lake. Clay County shoots fireworks over the lake for Independence Day each year.

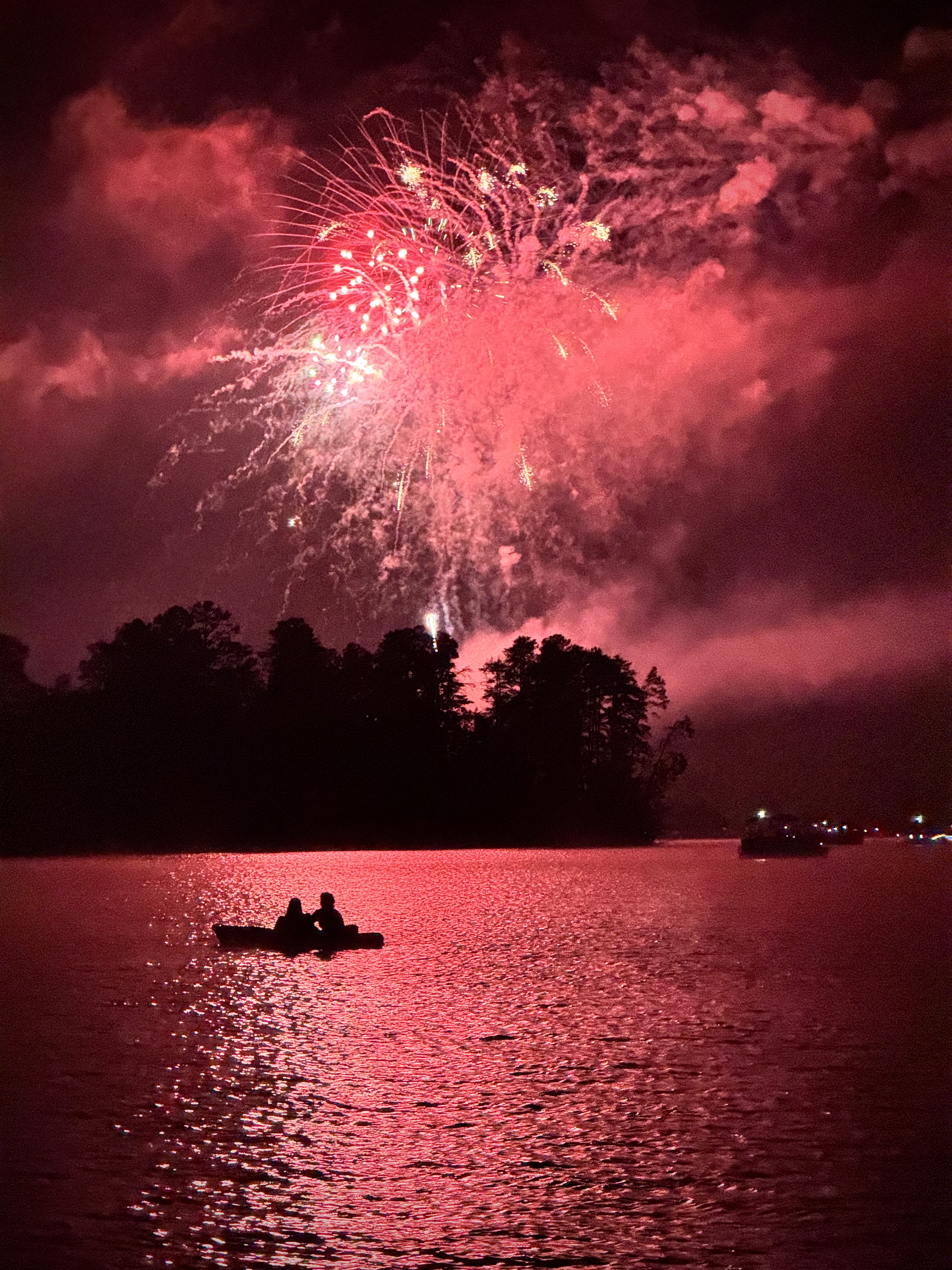
Boaters watch fireworks over Chatuge Lake on Independence Day

== History ==
The construction of Chatuge Dam and its reservoir required the purchase of 11,641 acres (4,711 ha) of land, 1,904 acres (771 ha) of which had to be cleared. 278 families, 532 graves, and 40 miles (64 km) of roads (including part of U.S. Route 64 and all of NC 69) had to be relocated. One house relocated from the Elf community during the clearing of the land later became the Clay County School District superintendent’s office until 2005. The TVA delayed its plans to fill the lake after a 92-year-old resident suffered a severe stroke and could not be removed from his homestead without dying. After he died the next month, Chatuge Dam's flood gates were closed. Old Burch Cemetery (established 1856) was surrounded by the creation of the lake, creating Cemetery Island. More than 300 graves were moved from the graveyard but 30 remain on the island at the request of their families. In 2025, TVA acknowledged that ancient burial grounds may be covered by the lake.

The total cost of creating Chatuge Lake was $8,874,866. Chatuge Dam was raised ten feet in 1954 so the lake level could rise an additional four feet. The Hinton Rural Life Center was built next to the lake in 1957. The annual Lake Chatuge Shoreline Cleanup started in 2011. In the event's first 16 years, 19.8 tons of trash were picked up from public land along the reservoir by 1,049 volunteers. In 2024, TVA announced it was investigating an infestation of the invasive Myriophyllum aquaticum plant that was threatening the lake.

TVA announced in 2025 that it is planning to lower Chatuge Lake's water level by an additional ten feet below its low winter level starting in late 2027. The draw-down is expected to take place over two years during the fall and winter seasons. The purpose is to complete extensive repairs to the dam's spillway and prevent a breach of the reservoir.

Beginning in late 2025, Congressman Chuck Edwards and Clay County residents opposed to TVA's Shooting Creek Transmission Project urged the utility to run a planned electrical line beneath Lake Chatuge rather than disturb nearby properties and views. In June 2026, TVA announced that an independent analysis it commissioned had determined that running a transmission line under the lake was infeasible, primarily due to expense and reliability issues.

== See also ==
- List of dams and reservoirs in the United States
