= List of people from Cleveland, Tennessee =

The following is a list of notable people who have lived in Cleveland, Tennessee.

== Notable people ==
- Travis Beacham, screenwriter, wrote the screenplay for the 2010 film Clash of the Titans and Pacific Rim
- William Breuer, author of The Great Raid on Cabanatuan and dozens of other books based on actual accounts of war
- Kevin Brooks, member of the Tennessee House of Representatives, mayor
- Anthony Burger, southern gospel pianist, played for the Kingsmen Quartet for several years, pianist for the Gaither Vocal Band and the Gaither Homecoming series
- Charles Paul Conn, author and university president
- Charles W. Conn, author and university president
- Phil Driscoll, trumpet player and founder of Mighty Horn Ministries
- Doyle Dykes, guitarist
- Richard M. Edwards, state legislator and Union Army colonel
- Mark Hall, member of the Tennessee House of Representatives District 24
- David Holsinger, concert band composer and conductor
- Rhyne Howard, WNBA player
- Dan Howell, member of the Tennessee House of Representatives
- Paul B. Huff, World War II soldier and Medal of Honor recipient
- Brittany Jackson,Lady Vol
- Bob Johnson, former NFL player and College Hall of Fame member
- Doc Johnston, Major League Baseball player, played in 11 seasons, seven with the Cleveland Indians; brother of Jimmy Johnston
- Jimmy Johnston, Major League Baseball player, appeared in 1916 and 1920 World Series; brother of Doc Johnston
- Allan Jones, businessman and founder of Check Into Cash Inc.
- Bob Jones III, third president of Bob Jones University
- Dale Jones, former NFL player, assistant coach at Appalachian State
- Alan J. Lacy, businessman and former CEO of Sears, Roebuck and Company
- Matt Lampson, soccer player
- Jacques McClendon, NFL offensive guard
- Jerry McKenna, sculptor and author (attended Bradley Central High School 1953–1954)
- Toby McKenzie, businessman and founder of National Cash Advance
- Darnell Mee, professional basketball player
- J. Chris Newton, former state representative
- Harold Wayne Nichols, convicted murderer and death row inmate; scheduled for execution on December 11, 2025
- Billie Nipper, horse artist
- Forrest Preston, owner, chairman and CEO of Life Care Centers of America
- Julius Eckhardt Raht, mining engineer and entrepreneur
- Jeremi Richardson, member of the contemporary Christian music group Avalon
- Tom Rowland, former mayor, the longest-serving in Tennessee history
- Alvin Scott, former NBA player
- Steve Sloan, former NFL player with Atlanta Falcons, All-American QB under Bear Bryant at Alabama, former All-State football and basketball at Bradley Central High School
- Phil Stacey, American Idol contestant; Lee University alumnus
- Perry Stone, international evangelist and author
- Mark Wills, country music singer
- Vincent Yarbrough, former NBA player, Denver Nuggets (2002–2003)
- John McCracken, social media influencer from TikTok, Instagram, twitch, and YouTube.https://www.tiktok.com/@bigjohn0731?is_from_webapp=1&sender_device=pc

== See also ==
- List of people from Tennessee
