= Lee University Campus Choir =

University worship Choir in Tennessee, U.S.

- Type: Choir
- Established: 1958
- Director: Mrs. Rhea Marshall
- Location: Cleveland, Tennessee, United States

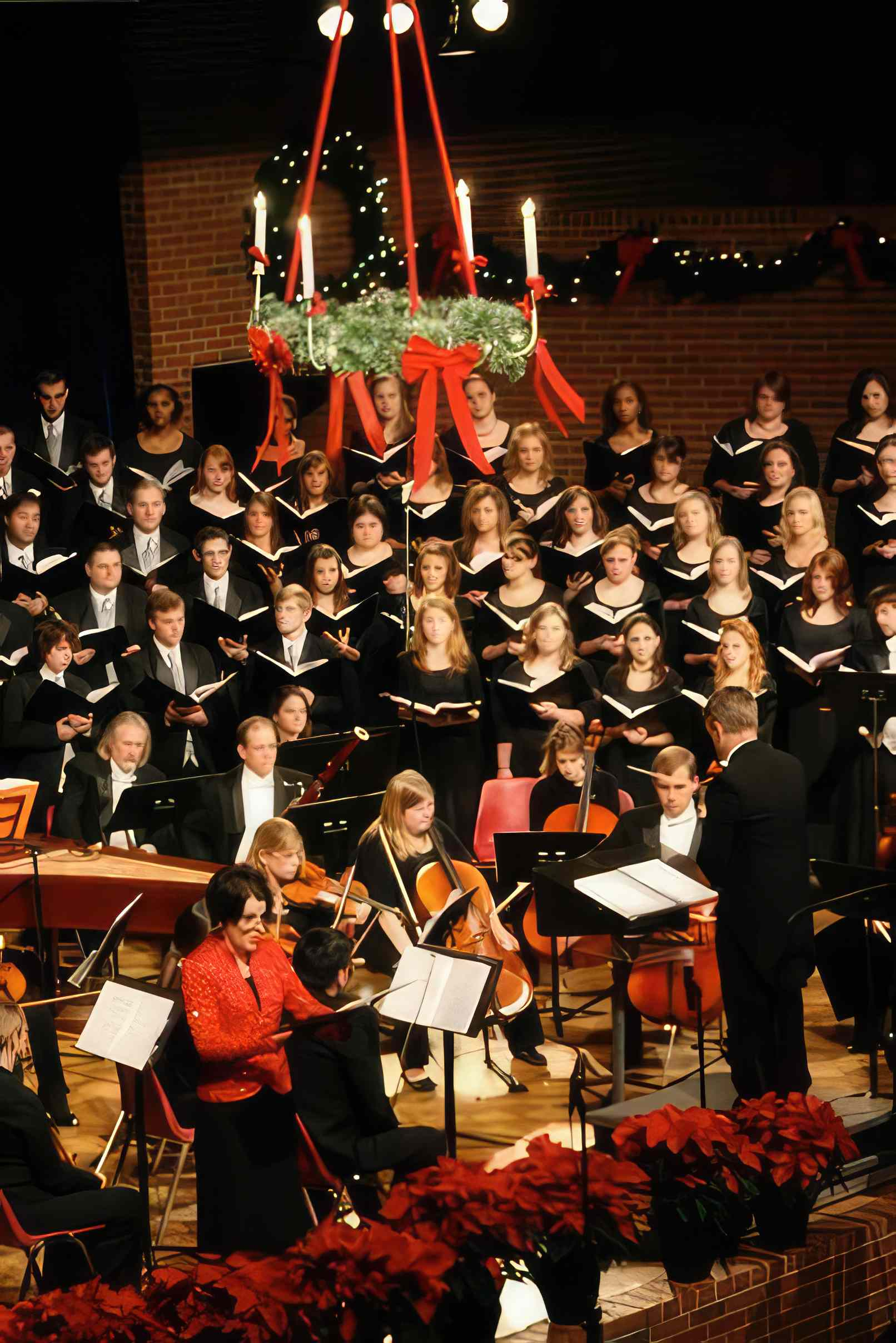
The Lee University Campus Choir performs during "Classic Christmas" in the Conn Center on campus December 7, 2008.

The Lee University Campus Choir is a worship choir associated with Lee University in Cleveland, Tennessee.

== History ==
In Cleveland, Tennessee, the Church of God started the Bible Training School which later became Lee College and is now Lee University. This higher education institution sponsored "The Church of God Hour" on the local radio stations and featured a 40 voice mixed choir, which has had several directors, including Harold Cato, Y.H. Yates, and Roosevelt Miller.

In 1958, A.T. Humphries divided the Mixed Choir into two distinct organizations – a touring choir and the Campus Choir.

Dr. David Horton was appointed as the director of Campus Choir in 1983. Starting with 58 students, the choir grew into an enrollment of 150 students. The decision was made to begin auditions and to limit the size of the choir to around 100 students, and the choir would begin to travel to local churches and sing an arrangement of choral music. Another influence at this time was the creation of Choral Union with the purpose of performing the great oratorios. Years later, Dr. Horton decided to make worship the main focus of the Lee University Campus Choir, and remains the focus of the choir to this day.

With several releases to their name, The Comforter Has Come was the final project under the direction of Dr. Horton, who had been director for 25 years until his death in 2006. Following, Campus Choir has been directed by Dr. Mark Bailey, Pastor Jimmy Phillips, and Dr. Luke Gambill. The ministry released several projects on all streaming services, even throughout the COVID pandemic, thanks to the initiative of Dr. Gambill. His term was wrapped up in June 2023 with Campus Choir touring in Israel and Palestine for ten days. As of August 2023, the ministry is currently under the leadership of Mrs. Rhea Marshall, a previous worship pastor of New Hope Church and a Campus Choir alumna.

== Directors ==
- A.T. Humphries (1958–1963)
- Dr. Delton Alfrord (1963–1967)
- Dr. Jim Burns (1967–1973)
- Jerry Long (1973–1974)
- Dr. Jim Burns (1974–1978)
- Dr. David Horton (1978–1980)
- Dr. Phillip Thomas (1980–1983)
- Dr. David Horton (1983–2006)
- Dr. Mark Bailey (2006–2007)
- Pastor Jimmy Phillips (2007–2020)
- Dr. Luke Gambill (2020-2023)
- Dr. Rhea Marshall (2023-)

== Performances ==
Campus Choir has performed with gospel musicians such as The Crabb Family, Jason Crabb, Mark Harris, Michael English, The Katinas, Natalie Grant, Joy Gardner, Alvin Slaughter, Ron Kenoly, Phil Driscoll, Geron Davis and Kindred Souls, and Judy Jacobs.

== Travel ==
Campus Choir has traveled around the United States and across the world leading worship to thousands of people. The choir has had the opportunity to sing at some of the leading churches in the U.S., including Times Square Church with Pastor David Wilkerson, Christ Church, Carpenter's Home Church in Lakeland, Florida, Omega Center International with Perry Stone in Cleveland, Tennessee, and Dwelling Place International with Judy Jacobs.

Many notable places Campus Choir has traveled to include Israel, Bulgaria, Ireland, England, Ecuador, and Guatemala. The choir has also been involved with The Inspiration Networks and Trinity Broadcasting Network.

== Recordings ==
=== Audio ===
- Premier Edition
- Sing Noel
- Power Unlimited
- Let the Church Rise
- Live From Bulgaria
- Gabriel's Song
- Revive Us Again (with Alvin Slaughter)
- Sing Out (with Ron Kenoly)
- Tree of Light
- Praise, Worship, and Glory
- God's Glorious Church
- Joy
- Jubilee
- Through the Fire
- Live in Worship
- Lord You're Holy
- Times of Refreshing
- The Comforter Has Come
- Can't Stop Praising Him
- Exceedingly, Abundantly- Spring 2012 Album
- Relentless Worship- Fall 2017 Album
- O Come, All Ye Faithful- Fall 2020 Single
- Raise Our Hallelujahs- Fall 2020 EP
- Speak His Name- Spring 2021 EP
- Still Everything (with Clara Jerman)- Spring 2022 Single
- Worthy- Fall 2022 EP

=== Video ===
- Let the Church Arise
- Live from Bulgaria
- Gabriel’s Song
- Sing Out with One Voice
- Praise, Worship and Glory
- Jubilee!
- Live In Worship
- The Comforter Has Come
- "Lord You're Holy"
- Oh Come, All Ye Faithful (single)
