= Conn (name) =

Conn is a masculine English and Irish-language given name, as well as an English-language surname. The origin of the given name is uncertain. It may be related to the Old Irish cond ("intellect", "mind", "king"), or perhaps to the Old Irish cenn ("head", "chief", "queen"). It is cognate with the Welsh, Cornish and Breton 'penn' ("head"), deriving ultimately from the proto-Celtic kʷennom. The latter word-origin may have resulted from a popular, but incorrect etymology, applied to the Old Irish terms Leth Cuinn and Dál Cuinn; these terms originally meant "half of the chief" or "half of the king" and "tribe of the chief" but were mistakenly regarded to mean "half of Conn" and "tribe of Conn". In some cases the given name is as a short form of names that begin with the first syllable Con- (such as the names Conor and Connor). According to historian C. Thomas Cairney, the Conns were a chiefly family of the Oirghialla or Airgíalla tribe who were in turn from the Laigin tribe who were the third wave of Celts to settle in Ireland during the first century BC.

== People ==
=== American ===
- Billy Conn (1917–1993), American boxer
- Bobby Conn (born 1967), American musician
- Canary Conn (born 1949), American musician and non-fiction author
- Charles Paul Conn (born 1945), American non-fiction author and university president
- Charles G. Conn, American founder of C.G. Conn Ltd.
- Charles W. Conn (1920–2008), American author, former General Overseer of the Church of God
- Conn Findlay (1930–2021), American Olympic rower and sailor
- Didi Conn (born 1951), American film, stage and television actress
- Edmond Conn (1914–1998), American farmer, businessman, and politician
- Eric C. Conn (born 1960), American former attorney and notorious convicted felon
- Herbert William Conn (1859–1917), American bacteriologist and educator
- Jan and Herb Conn, American climbing and caving pioneers
- Jerome W. Conn (1907–1994), American endocrinologist, first described Conn's syndrome
- Louie Conn, American dancer and NFL cheerleader
- Nicole Conn, American film director, producer, and screenwriter
- Phoebe Conn, American author
- Roe Conn, American radio talk show host, The Roe Conn Show
- Scott D. Conn, United States Navy admiral
- Virgil Conn (1847–1931), American politician
- Robert J Conn (born 1989) Business person

=== Australian ===
- Barry Conn, Australian botanist
- Daniel Conn, Australian rugby league player
- Neil Conn, former Administrator of the Northern Territory in Australia from 1997 to 2000

=== English ===
- Conn Iggulden is a British writer of historical novels.
- David Conn is a sports journalist focusing on football (soccer) for The Guardian a British newspaper.
- Gideon Conn is a singer-songwriter from Manchester.
- John Conn (1764–1810) was a senior captain in the Royal Navy during the American Revolutionary and Napoleonic Wars.
- Shelley Conn (born 1976), an English actress of Anglo-Indian descent.

=== Canadian ===
- Conn Smythe (1895–1980), a Canadian builder in the National Hockey League best known as the principal owner of the Toronto Maple Leafs from 1927 to 1961 and as the builder of Maple Leaf Gardens.
- Craig Conn (born 1983), a lacrosse player for the Arizona Sting in the National Lacrosse League and the New Westminster Salmonbellies of the Western Lacrosse Association
- Jan Conn (born 1952), a Canadian poet and mosquito genetic researcher.
- Kenneth Burns Conn (1896–1984), Canadian flying ace
- Michelle Conn (born 1963), a Canadian field hockey player.
- Ty Conn (1967–1999), born Tyrone Williams Conn, a Canadian bank robber best known for his escape over the wall from the Kingston Penitentiary, one of Canada's most secure and notorious prisons.

=== Irish ===
- Conn of the Hundred Battles, former High King of Ireland and the ancestor of the Connachta
- Conn O'Neill, 1st Earl of Tyrone (1480–1559), the 1st Earl of Tyrone in Ireland during the 16th century.
- Conn Ward (1890–1966), born Francis Constantine Ward, was an Irish Fianna Fáil party politician.
- Conn McCall (1940–2002), an Irish cricketer
- Conn McCluskey (1914–2013), Irish civil rights activist and medical doctor.

=== Scottish ===
- Alfie Conn Sr. (1926–2009), a Scottish professional footballer (soccer), most commonly remembered as part of the Terrible Trio of the Heart of Midlothian side of the 1950s, along with Willie Bauld and Jimmy Wardhaugh.
- Alfie Conn Jr. (born 1952), a former professional footballer, who was the first post-war player to play for both Celtic and Rangers.
- Iain Conn (born 1962), an executive director of the BP Group.
- Stewart Conn (born 1936), a Scottish poet and playwright

== See also ==
- Irish clans
