= Charles Conn =

Charles Conn may refer to:

- Charles G. Conn (1844–1931), U.S. Representative from Indiana and the namesake of the musical instrument company C.G. Conn Inc.
- Charles Paul Conn (born 1945), president of Lee University
- Charles R. Conn (born 1961), Warden of Rhodes House and CEO of the Rhodes Scholarships
- Charles W. Conn (1920–2008), author and prominent religious figure in the Church of God
- C.G. Conn, a United States manufacturer of musical instruments
