= Raymond Culpepper =

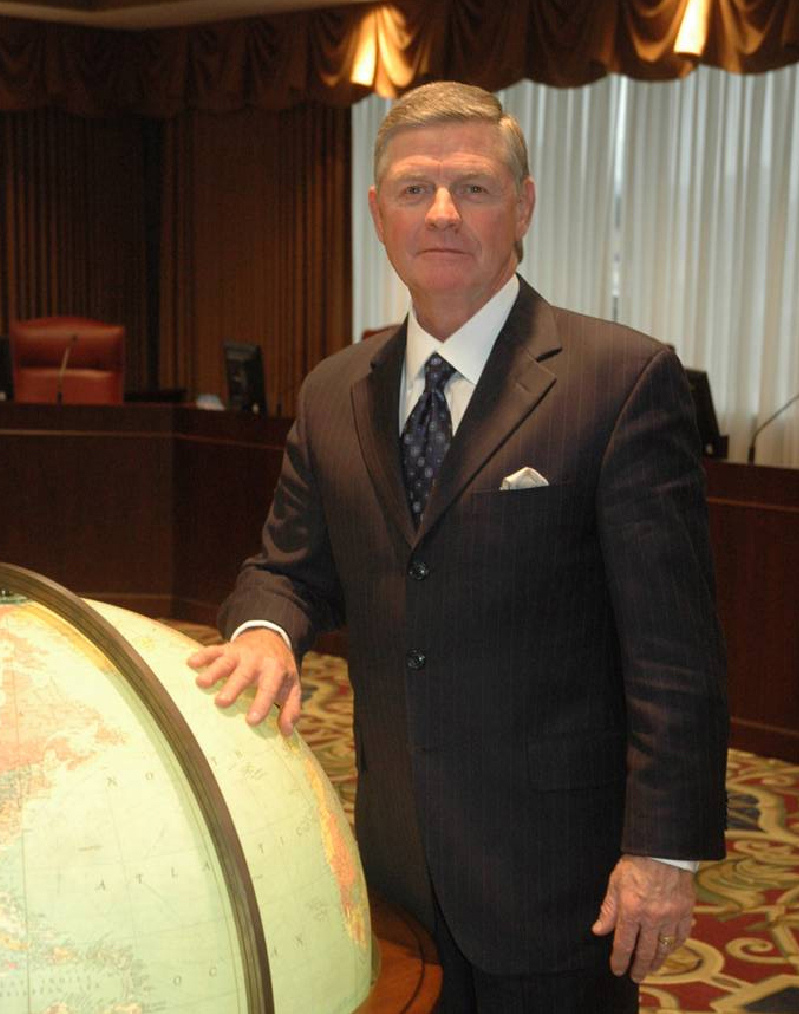
Culpepper in 2011

Raymond F. Culpepper is an American pastor, author, Administrative Bishop of Alabama and former General Overseer of the Church of God. The General Overseer is the highest office in the Church of God denomination and has primary responsibility for leading a membership of over 9 million members spanning 180 countries. From 2016 to 2024, Dr Raymond F Culpepper served as 1st Assistant General Overseer of the Church of God. He had previously served two terms as First Assistant General Overseer, and has been on the Executive “Council of 18” on three occasions. Culpepper served as Administrative Bishop of Alabama from 2012 to 2016 and formally served as General Overseer from 2008 to 2012 having been originally elected at the Church of God General Assembly in 2008. Previously, he has been the Church of God State Youth and education director for Northern California, Nevada, Indiana, and Alabama.

Culpepper founded the Riverchase Church of God in August 1980 with 18 charter members. In August 1981, under the direction and leadership of the Holy Spirit, the Vestavia Church and Riverchase Church merged with Raymond Culpepper as pastor. In September, the name of the church was changed to Metropolitan Church of God, affectionately referred to as Metro.

Under Culpepper's leadership, Metro grew and became one of the largest churches in Birmingham. In 1999, the church relocated from its campus on Columbiana Road to its present 32-acre interstate campus.

Raymond has published many articles and several books, including: The Leading Man, Lifestyle To His Glory, Power Living, The Great Commission Connection, and No Church Left Behind.

Culpepper holds a Bachelor of Science and honorary Doctorate of Divinity degree from Lee University. He also served for 12 years as Chairman of the Lee University Board of Directors. In 1999, Raymond was selected as Lee University's Distinguished Alumnus of the Year. As a student at Lee, he was one of the early members of Upsilon Xi, and was honored in 1988 as Upsilon Xi's Alumnus of the Year. Raymond also holds a masters from the California Graduate School of Theology.

Raymond is the son of J. Frank and Kohatha Culpepper. J. Frank was a former Assistant General Overseer of the Church of God. Raymond has been married to the former Peggy Price since 1970, and has three children: Raymond II, Elizabeth and Jessica.
