= Judy Jacobs =

- Also known as: Judy Jacobs Tuttle
- Born: September 27, 1957 (age 68); Lumberton, North Carolina
- Origin: Cleveland, Tennessee
- Genres: CCM, gospel, traditional black gospel, urban contemporary gospel
- Occupations: Singer, songwriter
- Instruments: Vocals, singer-songwriter
- Years active: 1984–present
- Labels: His Song, New Day, Daywind
- Website: judyjacobs.com

Judith Jacobs Tuttle, known professionally as Judy Jacobs (born September 27, 1957), is an American gospel musician. She started her music career when she attended Lee College in 1984, singing with the New Harvest singers and releasing her album in 1987 "Judy Jacobs: with New Harvest." published by Pathway Press. She has released eight more albums, since her first release, with two more labels New Day Records and Daywind Records. Two albums have charted on the Billboard magazine charts, which have exclusively come on the Gospel Albums chart.

== Early life ==
Jacobs was born Judy Jacobs on September 27, 1957, in Lumberton, North Carolina, as the youngest of twelve siblings, and she commenced singing at the age of eight with The Jacobs Sisters. She attended Lee University, for her collegiate studies.

== Music career ==
Her recording music career started in 1987 with the release of Judy Jacobs: With New Harvest. She later released another album titled "No God Like Jehovah" in 2001 with her own label "His Song Ministries" She has released two albums that charted on the Billboard magazine Gospel Albums chart at No. 16 for Almighty Reigns that was released by His Song on November 22, 2005. With New Day Records, Jacobs released, I Feel a Change, in 2011 that charted at No. 33 on the aforementioned chart.

== Personal life ==
She is married to Jamie Tuttle. The couple are co-pastors of Dwelling Place Church International in Cleveland, Tennessee. They are the co-owners of the His Song Music Group label. Together they have two daughters, Erica and Kaylee.

== Discography ==
=== Studio albums ===
List of selected studio albums, with selected chart positions
Title	Album details	Peak chart positions
Title	Album details	US Gos
Almighty Reigns	Released: 2005; Label: His Song; CD, digital download	16
I Feel a Change	Released: 2011; Label: New Day; CD, digital download	33
