= Candace Barley =

American rugby player

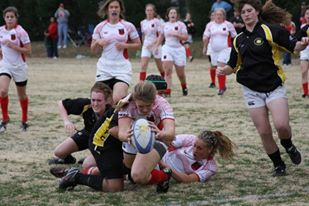
Candace Barley scores a try with Maryville Rugby Football Club in 2009 at the annual Nash Bash rugby tournament

Candace Barley (born May 2, 1991 in Concord, Virginia) is an American rugby player who was the youngest player to compete on the national team and play in an international match. She also holds the title of most-capped U20 player in the country with 13 international games during her four years with the Junior Eagles. Outside of her international rugby career, she played rugby at Maryville Rugby Football Club from 2004 to 2009, Lee University's Women's Rugby Football Club from 2009 to 2014, and Nashville Women's Rugby Football Club from 2015–present, as well as with the Gypsy Rugby Football Club from 2015–present.
