= List of mayors of Cleveland, Tennessee =

City of Cleveland, Tennessee mayors

The following is a list of mayors of the city of Cleveland, Tennessee, United States of America.

- John Calhoun Ramsey, 1886–1887
- Charles Stanwix Mayfield, 1906–1912
- John Yeuell Elliott, 1934 – 1943
- Willard J. Parks, c. 1949 – 1955
- James F. Corn, c. 1956 – 1958
- C. F. Kelly, ca.1960
- William K. Fillauer, c. 1963 – 1965
- Harry L. Dethero, c. 1968 – 1980
- Bill Schultz, c. 1985 – 1991
- Tom Rowland, 1991–2017
- Kevin Brooks, 2018–present

== See also ==
- Cleveland history
