= Allan Jones (businessman) =

American businessman

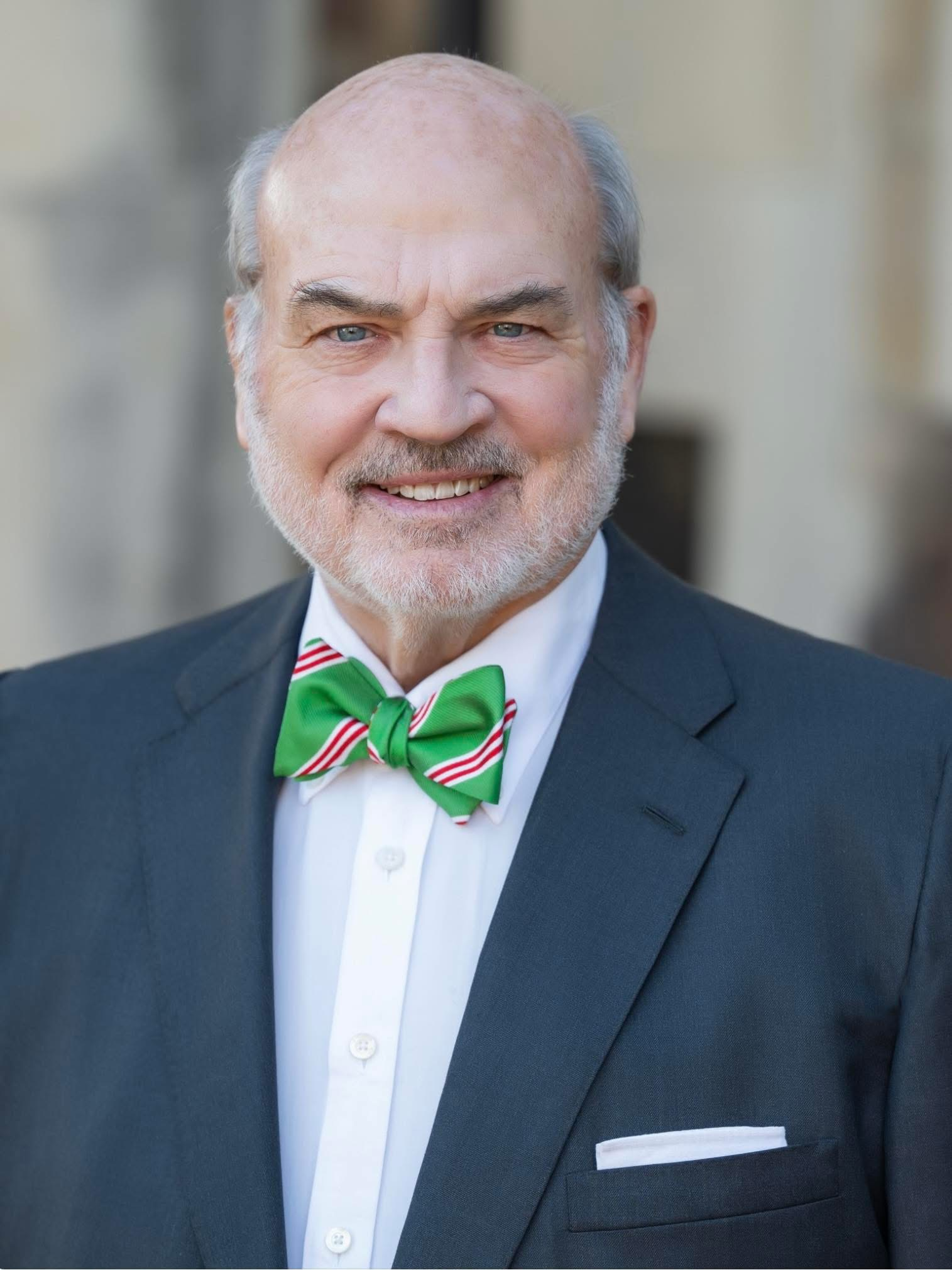
- Jones in 2024
- Born: William Allan Jones, Jr. December 31, 1952 (age 73); Cleveland, Tennessee, US
- Education: Cleveland High School
- Alma mater: Middle Tennessee State University
- Occupation: Businessman
- Spouse(s): Candy Robinson (1972-75) Janie Pangle (m. 1983)
- Children: 4

William Allan Jones Jr. (born December 31, 1952) is an American businessman from Cleveland, Tennessee. He is the founder, chairman and CEO of Check Into Cash, Creditcorp, Jones Management Services and the Community Financial Services Association, and several other local lending agencies. He has been called the "father of the payday loan industry" for founding and building the first major payday loan chain.

== Early life and education ==
Jones was born on December 31, 1952, in Cleveland, Tennessee to William A. (Bill) Jones (1919–1981) and Virginia Slaughter Jones (1925–2003). He was the first baby to ever be born at Cleveland's Bradley Memorial Hospital. Jones donated the first Mother's Garden at the hospital in honor of his mother, wife, and daughters.

Jones attended Cleveland High School, where he wrestled and won various awards and served as team captain. He graduated in 1972. Jones credited wrestling with helping build character: "In wrestling, I didn't have anyone to rely on but me." He declined wrestling scholarships to pursue a business degree at Middle Tennessee State University.

== Business career ==
=== Early career ===
Jones left college at age 20 to help his father stabilize the family's small business, the Credit Bureau of Cleveland. He purchased the business from his father in 1977 and developed it to become the largest privately owned credit bureau databases in the state, covering 63 counties.

Jones sold the credit reporting side of the business to Equifax in 1988, although he retained the name and the company's collection agency division. He then built the company to be the largest in Tennessee with offices from Memphis to Atlanta. Jones sold the company in 1998. The sale to Equifax set a record for the highest price per earnings paid for a credit reporting business.

Jones founded Check Into Cash in 1993. The idea arose from him seeing a former credit bureau manager who was operating out of a small service station and cashing checks with the agreement that the owner would hold the checks until the next payday before submitting them to the bank. Check Into Cash eventually grew to include 1,300 stores nationwide.

=== Check Into Cash ===
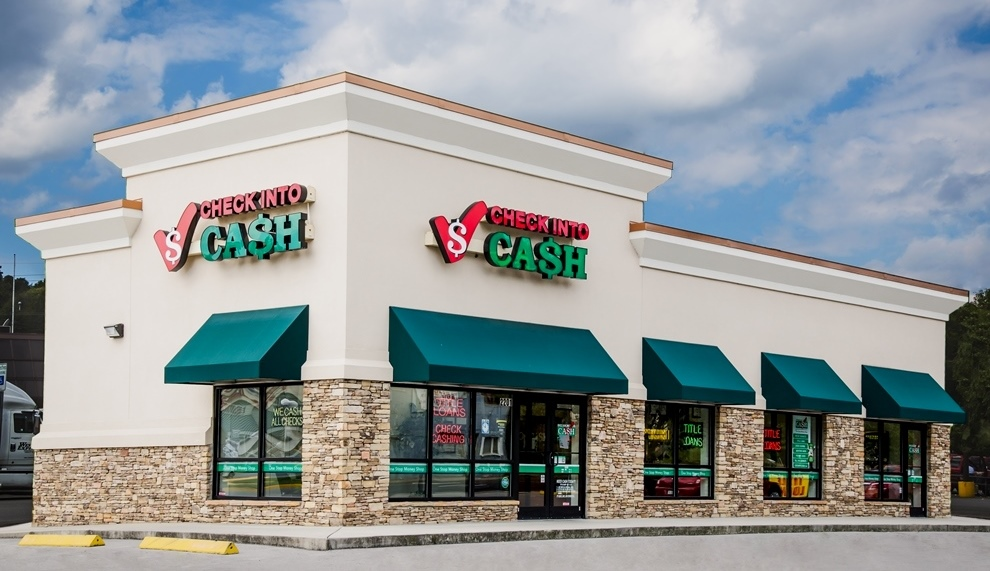
Check Into Cash store.

Jones opened the first Check Into Cash store in Cleveland, Tennessee in 1993. The business model was legalised in 1997 after Jones and other payday industry executives lobbied the Tennessee state legislature to allow payday lending. The Los Angeles Times reported that Jones made over $23,000 in political donations during this time while Harper's Magazine reported $29,000 in political donations.

Jones merged Check Into Cash in 2021 with Community Choice Financial. In 2022, he announced that Community Choice had acquired competitor Speedy Cash and the company's 1,700 employees.

=== Community Financial Services Association ===
Jones has been credited with founding the Community Financial Services Association of America, or CFSA in 1999. CFSA is the national trade association for companies that offer small-dollar, short-term loans or payday advances. Through a code of "Best Practices," CFSA members pledge to abide by responsible industry practices that ensure customers understand the cost and risk of short-term payday advances to facilitate the best financial decisions. The practices also require that members hold themselves "to the highest standard of service".

Jones said he founded CFSA after breaking away from the National Check Cashers Association, due to concerns that the NCCA, now called Financial Service Centers of America, was not giving enough attention to the payday lending industry.

=== Hardwick Clothes ===
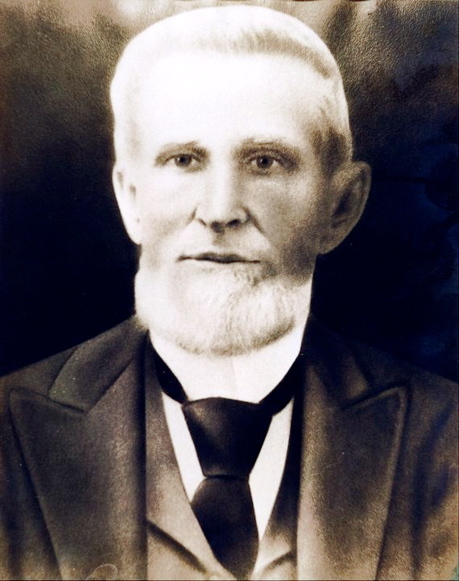
C.L. Hardwick, founder of Hardwick Clothes

In 2014, Jones purchased Hardwick Clothes, a company founded in Cleveland, in 1880. Hardwick Clothes is the oldest manufacturer of tailor-made clothing in the United States.

Hardwick Clothes, which began as Cleveland Woolen Mills, was one of two companies founded by C.L. Hardwick in the 19th century. Hardwick put his son Joseph in charge of Hardwick Stove, the family's other business, while his son George ran the clothing company. Cleveland Woolen Mills soon evolved into a manufacturing plant, making suits and other items of apparel. Hardwick Stove was absorbed into Maytag in 1981.

The company, known for its "Sewn in the South" slogan and renowned during the 1960s for making the world's best blazer, was facing bankruptcy when Jones acquired it. Jones has said he was attracted to Hardwick Clothes because it was the oldest business of its kind in America, and is convinced that the American consumer pendulum is swinging back to "made in America."

Within weeks of purchasing Hardwick Clothes, Jones named Bruce Bellusci, former executive vice president at Hart Schafner & Marx, the company's new CEO/president. He also recruited Hart's designer, engineer, and three top salesmen to Hardwick.

In September 2017, Jones made national headlines when he announced that Hardwick Clothes, Check Into Cash and his other companies would no longer advertise during NFL games as a response to the national anthem protests by the league's players, which the businessman called "unpatriotic behavior." Jones was featured on the Fox Business Network discussing the decision.

Jones sold Hardwick in December 2019 to the company Puerto Rico Industries for the Blind.

=== Other business ventures ===
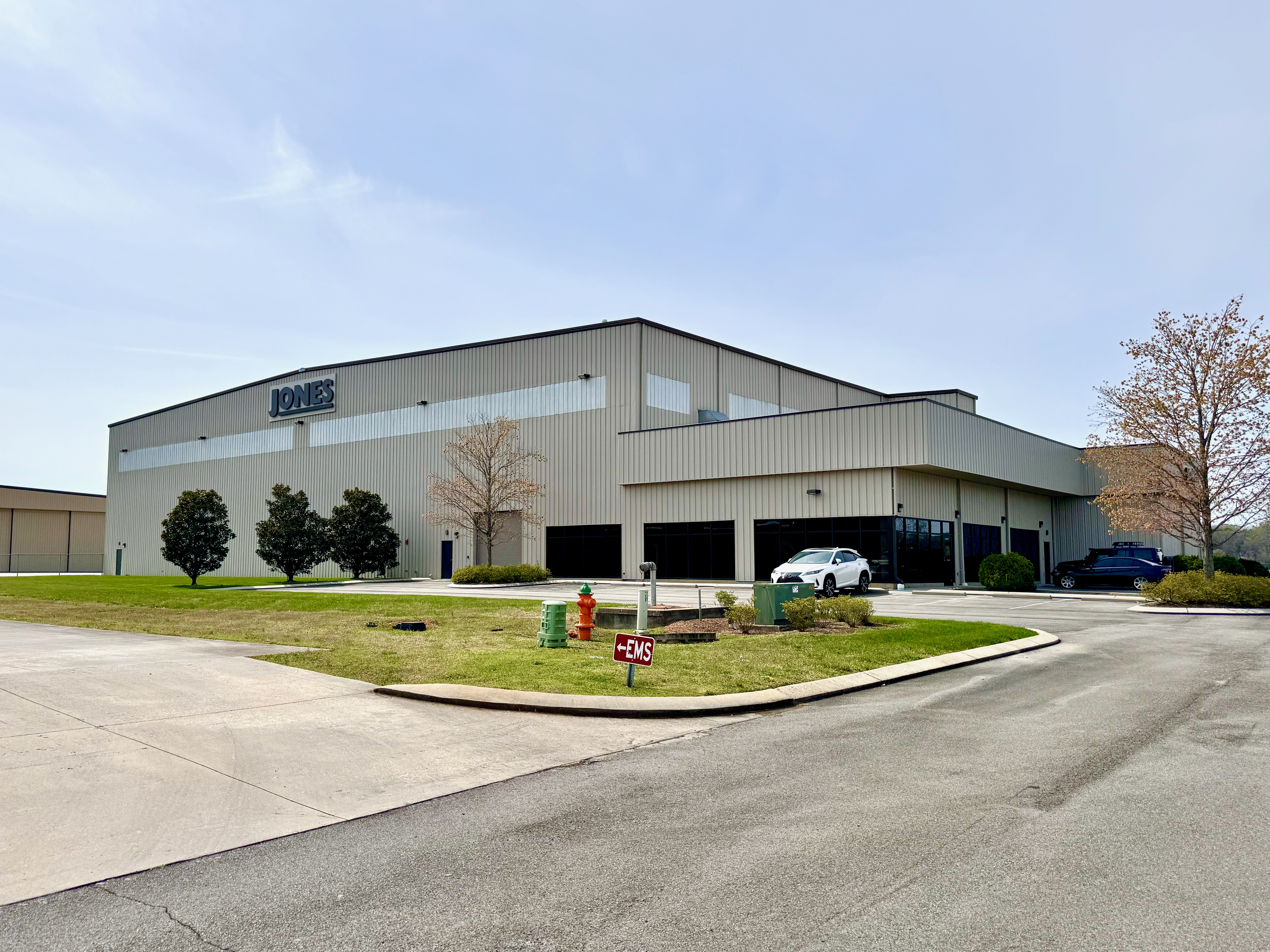
Allan Jones' hangar at the Cleveland Regional Jetport

Jones is the largest property owner in Bradley County and has renovated many buildings, including a former shopping mall that he altered to become a site for his companies.

The Cleveland/Bradley Chamber of Commerce awarded Jones with the M.C. Headrick Free Enterprise Award, the organization's highest honor in 2003. That same year Jones was inducted into the University of Tennessee at Chattanooga's Entrepreneurship Hall of Fame.

Jones was included on BusinessTN magazine's "Power 100" list in 2005. Jones appeared on the cover of BusinessTN Magazine and was characterized as "The King of Cash". The magazine ranked Jones as one of the 20 wealthiest people in Tennessee.

In addition to Check Into Cash, Jones has founded or purchased several affiliate agencies, including U.S. Money Shops, a pawn agency, LendingFrog.com, an online lending agency, Loan By Phone, and Buy Here Pay Here USA, a used car finance dealer.

== High school wrestling support ==
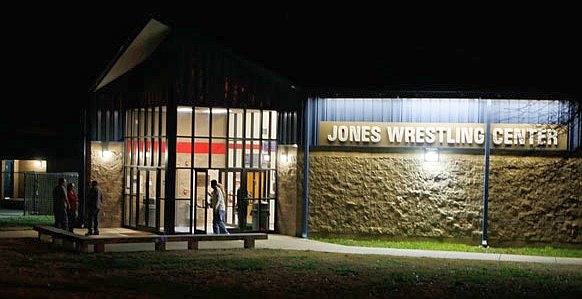
Jones Wrestling Center

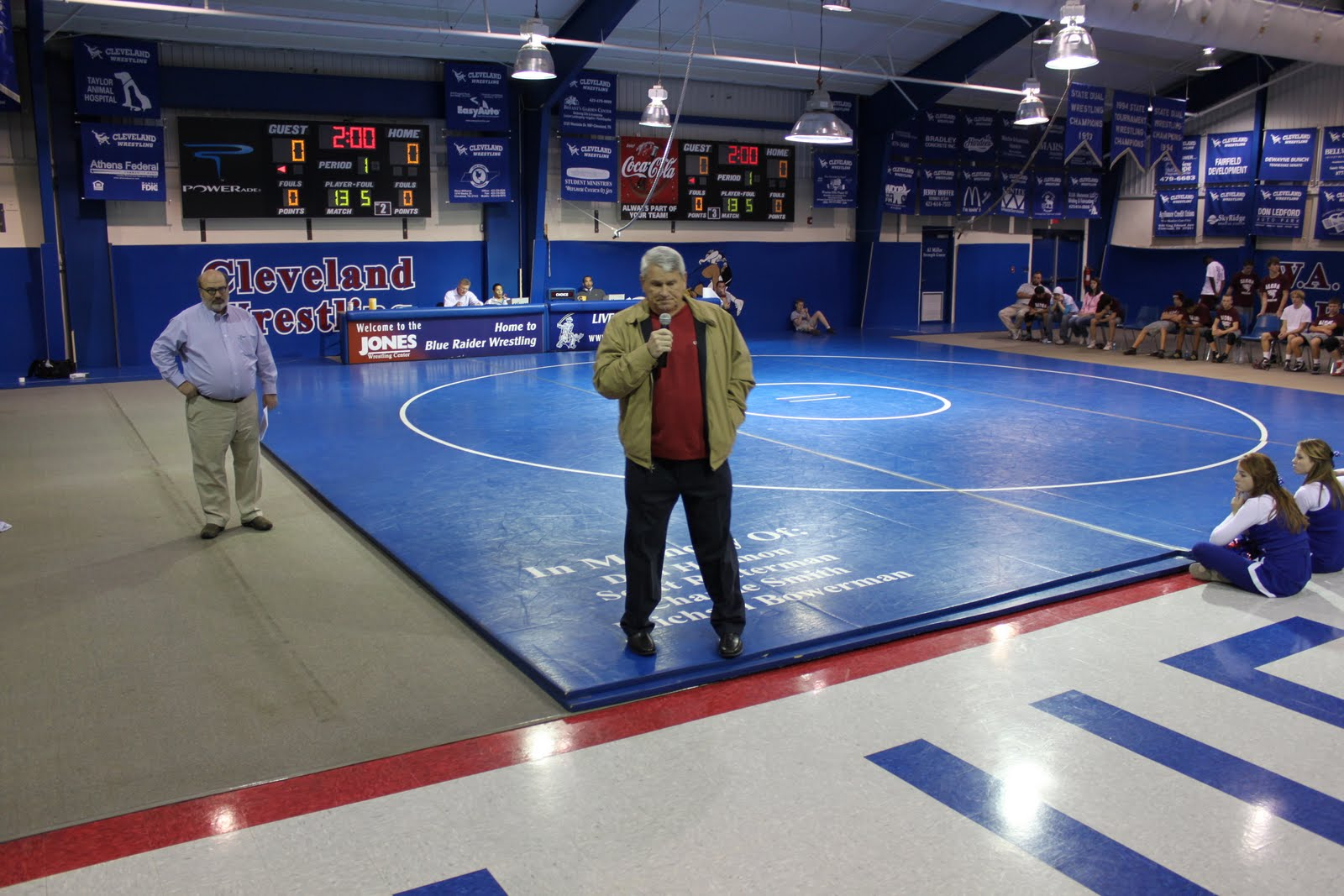
Jones, far left, inside the Jones Wrestling Center.

Jones is the largest individual supporter of high school wrestling in the United States. He founded the Cleveland/Bradley Wrestling Club in 1990, and provided the $1.3 million funding for the Jones Wrestling Center located on the Cleveland High School campus. Jones was also the sole funder of the wrestling building at Bradley Central High School. The clubs have been successful, with Jones remarking that "It has very little to do with the buildings and it has everything to do with the right coaches.". Bradley Central High School has won 26 state championships, most recently in 2017.

In the 2013 state championship, Cleveland beat runner-up Wilson Central 78–4, setting a TSSAA record for the most lopsided margin of victory, most pins and quickest championship. Since the 2006–07 season, the wrestling team has won state championships in 2011, 2013, 2014, 2015, 2018, 2019, 2020, 2021 as well as 2022, 2023, and 2024.

In 2016, Jones was inducted into the National Wrestling Hall of Fame located in Stillwater, Oklahoma. In 2017, Jones received national attention when he auctioned off a 2009 King Ranch F-150 four-wheel drive pickup truck autographed twice by President George W. Bush. The proceeds of the auction went to benefit Cleveland's Higher Calling Youth Wrestling Club and the National Wrestling Hall of Fame Dan Gable Museum.

== Philanthropy ==
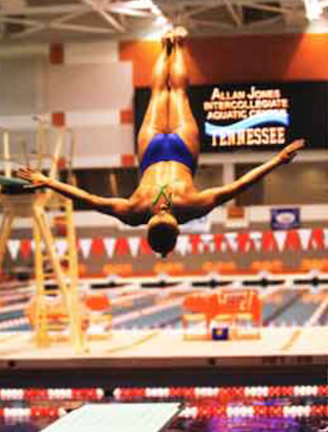
Allan Jones Aquatic Center at the University of Tennessee

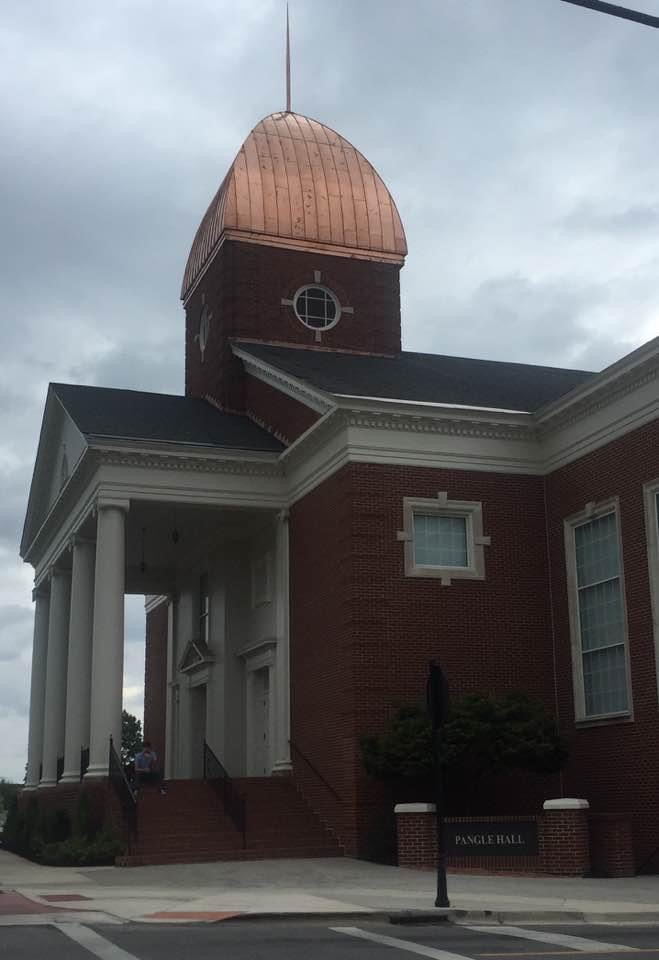
Lee University's Pangle Hall in Cleveland, Tennessee.

In 1990, Jones founded MainStreet Cleveland, dedicated to the revitalization and promotion of Cleveland's historic downtown area and donated the funds for the construction of the Virgil F. Carmichael addition to the Cleveland Public Library.

In 2011, Jones contributed to the non-profit organization tnAchieves, enabling it to launch its scholarship and mentoring program in all three Bradley County high schools, ensuring that every graduating senior from Cleveland High School, Walker Valley High School, and Bradley Central High School had the opportunity to attend Cleveland State Community College. In 2015, Jones was awarded the first-ever honorary degree from Cleveland State. A few days later, Jones received the Chancellor's Award for Excellence in Philanthropy from the Tennessee Board of Regents.

In 2012, Jones received the Fred Gregg Jr Award from the Greater Chattanooga Sports Hall of Fame for contributions to sports.

In 2014, the Jones family gave a donation to Lee University to purchase the old First Baptist Church building in downtown Cleveland and renovate it into a music performance hall. The building was named "Pangle Hall" in honor of Jones' wife Janie Pangle Jones. Lee University President Paul Conn said Pangle Hall was only possible due to this donation.

In 2017, Jones donated 43,000 pairs of eclipse-viewing sunglasses to students in six Tennessee school systems, to ensure students who wanted to view the solar eclipse did so only with safe, NASA-approved glasses.

== Tall Betsy ==
Jones is credited with the creation of the legend of Tall Betsy, a Halloween figure based in Bradley County.

== Criticism and controversy ==
=== Payday loan business model ===
Jones' company Check Into Cash and the Payday loan business model have received criticism for its high interest rates, for harming its customers and for targeting those of low-income.

The legality of Jones' payday loan model was challenged shortly after Check into Cash was founded. Initially Jones and other payday lenders claimed that the fee charged did not constitute interest, and therefore did not violate laws capping a maximum interest on loans, which runs contrary to multiple federal laws. In 1997 Check Into Cash was sued in a class-action lawsuit by two Cleveland attorneys, representing multiple customers, alleging violation of the Truth in Lending Act and Fair Debt Collection Act, as well as other illegal practices. Check Into Cash eventually settled the case by paying $2.2 million to the class and $500,000 in attorneys' fees.

Jones then began lobbying the legislatures in multiple states to change laws which place caps on interest, which led to the passage of multiple acts including the Tennessee Deferred Presentment Services Act by the Tennessee General Assembly, which permits payday lending with some restrictions. This act considers the fee to borrow money from a payday lender not to be interest, stating "the fee, when made and collected, shall not be deemed interest for any purpose of law."

=== African Americans ===
In a 2010 interview with The Huffington Post, when asked about the lack of diversity in his hometown of Cleveland, Jones allegedly said, "We have just enough blacks to put together a decent basketball team — but not so many the good people of Cleveland, Tennessee need to worry about crime. That's why I can leave my keys in the car with the door unlocked". He noted that many of his company managers and friends are African Americans. The article cited an anonymous source who claimed some company employees referred to a black man who shines shoes as the "Little Chocolate Man", although no source for the comment was ever provided. Also in that interview, a former employee of Jones' company stated that Jones' barber shop was successful because of "female barbers with big titties."

Jones denied ever making the statements to numerous media outlets and claimed he was misquoted, stating "I gave generously of my time...to assist in the preparation for writing a book, purported to fairly represent the credit needs of the middle income working population and the markets that serve them. Unfortunately, (the author) has chosen to rearrange some of my remarks to draw incorrect conclusions regarding my personal views and beliefs."

=== Spring Branch ===
In the early 2010s, Jones partnered with the local Chamber of Commerce, whose building he owns, to petition the city of Cleveland and Bradley County to jointly purchase one of his properties for an industrial park. Jones had struggled to sell this property for many years, and reportedly suggested this tract to the Chamber of Commerce when he learned they were interested in a new publicly owned industrial park. The property was then jointly purchased for $6 million and developed into the Spring Branch Industrial Park over the next several years by the city, county, and Cleveland Utilities, a local public utility who was brought onto the purchase due to the city's poor bond ratings. This project was widely criticized as a boondoggle and bad investment, as well as corporate welfare, and reportedly cost the local taxpayers tens of millions of dollars.

=== Wiretapping case ===
Jones was indicted on federal charges of wiretapping in 1975 after he placed a recording device on the telephone at his home located at 320 Bowman Avenue NW in October 1974. Jones put the device on the phone in order to determine if his first wife was having an extramarital affair, which she reportedly was. The wife was granted a restraining order against Jones but it was dissolved immediately by the judge quickly after it had been issued. Jones reportedly used information from the recordings to obtain a divorce.

The indictment was dismissed by the local district court before Jones could go to trial. This dismissal was upheld by the U.S. Court of Appeals for the Sixth Circuit in 1976, primarily because the phone that had been wiretapped belonged to Jones and was in his name. The court affirmed that wiretapping, or adding an extension to a phone line, is not a crime if the act is performed by the owner of the phone. The court noted that the government had neglected to tell this information to the grand jury. The government appealed the decision, and the Sixth Circuit upheld the acquittal.

== Personal life ==
Jones' residence is called Creekridge and is located on 400 acres north of Cleveland. It consists of a more than $5 million house constructed between 2003 and 2009, as well as a football field, horse stables, a greenhouse and a classic car collection. It is located near the residence of fellow businessman Forrest Preston. Jones previously lived in the Centenary Avenue Historic District in downtown Cleveland.

Politically, Jones has been an Independent, and has donated to the campaigns of both Democratic and Republican politicians, but his views are characterized to be right-leaning and fiscally conservative. Jones supported Donald Trump in the 2016 U.S. Presidential Election. A few days after the inauguration of President Trump, Jones stated in an interview with Fox & Friends that he was "tired of Presidents who were politicians" and believed that small businesses would benefit from Trump's policies.

== See also ==
- Toby McKenzie
