= G. Dennis McGuire =

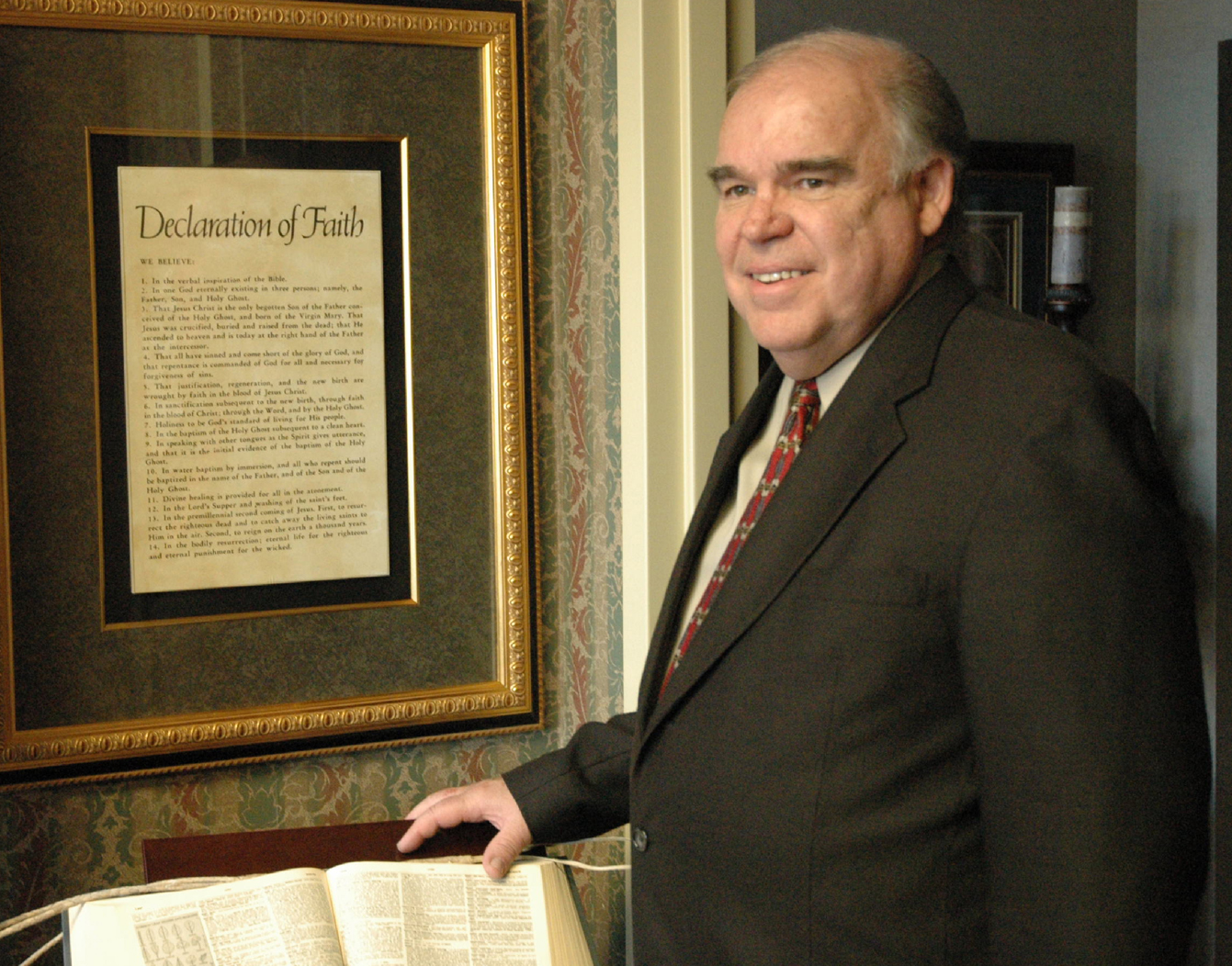

G. Dennis McGuire is a pastor, evangelist, and administrator in the Church of God denomination. He served two terms as the General Overseer (2004 and 2006) and has also been First and Second Assistant General Overseer. The General Overseer is the highest office in the Church of God and has primary responsibility for leading a current membership of over 7 million members spanning 185 countries.

McGuire's ministerial background includes a wide variety of pastoral and administrative roles in the Church of God. He pastored a total of 16 years before being appointed to serve as Church of God State Overseer of Indiana in 1984. He went on to serve as the State Overseer of Texas (1986–88), Western North Carolina (1988–90) and Tennessee. He has also been the assistant director of Evangelism and Home Missions (1990–92), and the International Director of Military and Multi-Cultural Ministries.

McGuire holds a Bachelor of Arts from Lee University, Master of Arts from Assemblies of God Theological Seminary, and honorary Doctorate of Divinity degree from East Coast Bible College. In 1994, he was selected as Lee University's Distinguished Alumnus of the Year. As a student at Lee, he was elected student body president for the 1965–66 school year and was one of the early members of Upsilon Xi. He was honored in 1998 as Upsilon Xi's Alumnus of the Year.

His hometown city of Kingsport, Tennessee honored him on August 5, 2007, naming it "Dr. G. Dennis McGuire Day."
