= Kevin Brooks (politician) =

American politician (born 1967)

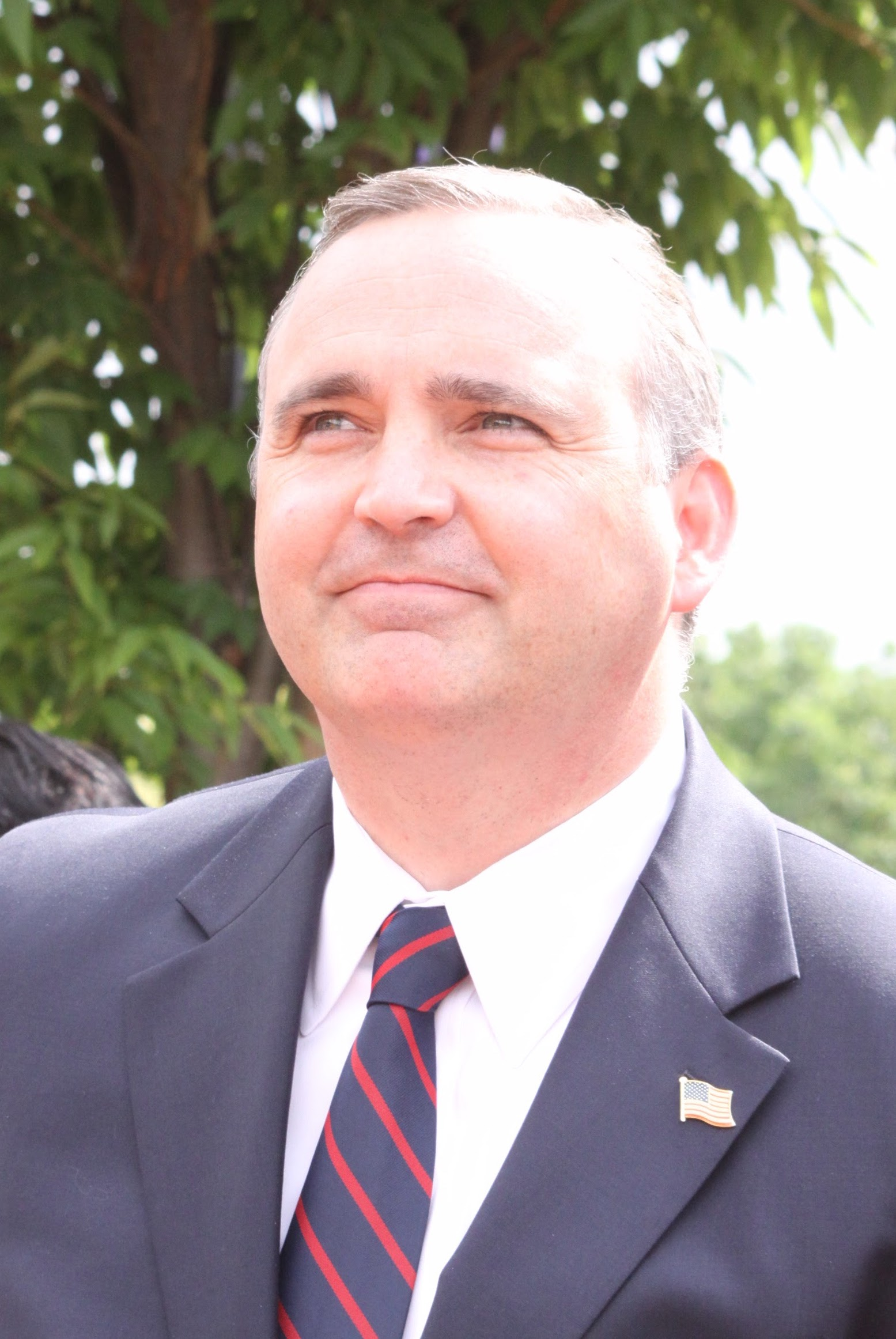

Member of the Tennessee House of Representatives from the 24th district
- In office January 2006 – September 10, 2018
- Preceded by: Dewayne Bunch
- Succeeded by: Mark Hall

Mayor of Cleveland, Tennessee
- Incumbent
- Assumed office September 10, 2018
- Preceded by: Tom Rowland

Personal details
- Born: May 4, 1967 (age 59) Marietta, Georgia
- Party: Republican
- Education: Lee University (B.A.)

Kevin Brooks (born May 4, 1967) is an American politician who is the mayor of Cleveland, Tennessee. Between 2006 and the beginning of his term as mayor he served as a Republican member of the Tennessee House of Representatives for the 24th district, encompassing Cleveland and parts of Bradley County.

== Early life ==
Kevin Brooks was born in 1967 in Marietta, Georgia. He first moved to Cleveland in 1986 to attend Lee University. He received a B.A. in history, and was named an honorary member of Upsilon Xi.

== Career ==
Brooks served for six consecutive terms as a State Representative. He was first elected in 2006, and reelected in 2008, 2010, 2012, 2014, and 2016. In 2011, Brooks received the "Legislator of the Year" award by Tennessee Community Organizers. In March 2011, he declined an automatic pay raise. He was Chair of the Subcommittee on Children and Family Affairs, Vice Chair of the Children and Family Affairs committee, and a member of the Subcommittee on Education, as well as the Education, Finance, Ways and Means, and the Rules committees. He was Chair of the Blue Ribbon Advisory Council on School Redistricting and former Assistant Chair of the Majority Caucus of the Tennessee State House of Representatives.

In January 2018, Brooks announced his candidacy for mayor of Cleveland, therefore not running for a 7th term. He was endorsed by long-incumbent mayor Tom Rowland, who announced that he would not seek reelection. On August 2, 2018 he was elected with 64% of the vote. Brooks was sworn in on September 10, 2018, and resigned from the state house that day.

== Personal life ==
Brooks is married to Kim, and has two children. He is a member of the Church of God.

Brooks is a member of the Cleveland Rotary Club, the United Way of Bradley County, MainStreet Cleveland, and the Religious Conference Management Association.

== See also ==
- List of mayors of Cleveland, Tennessee
