= Forrest Preston =

American businessman (born 1933)

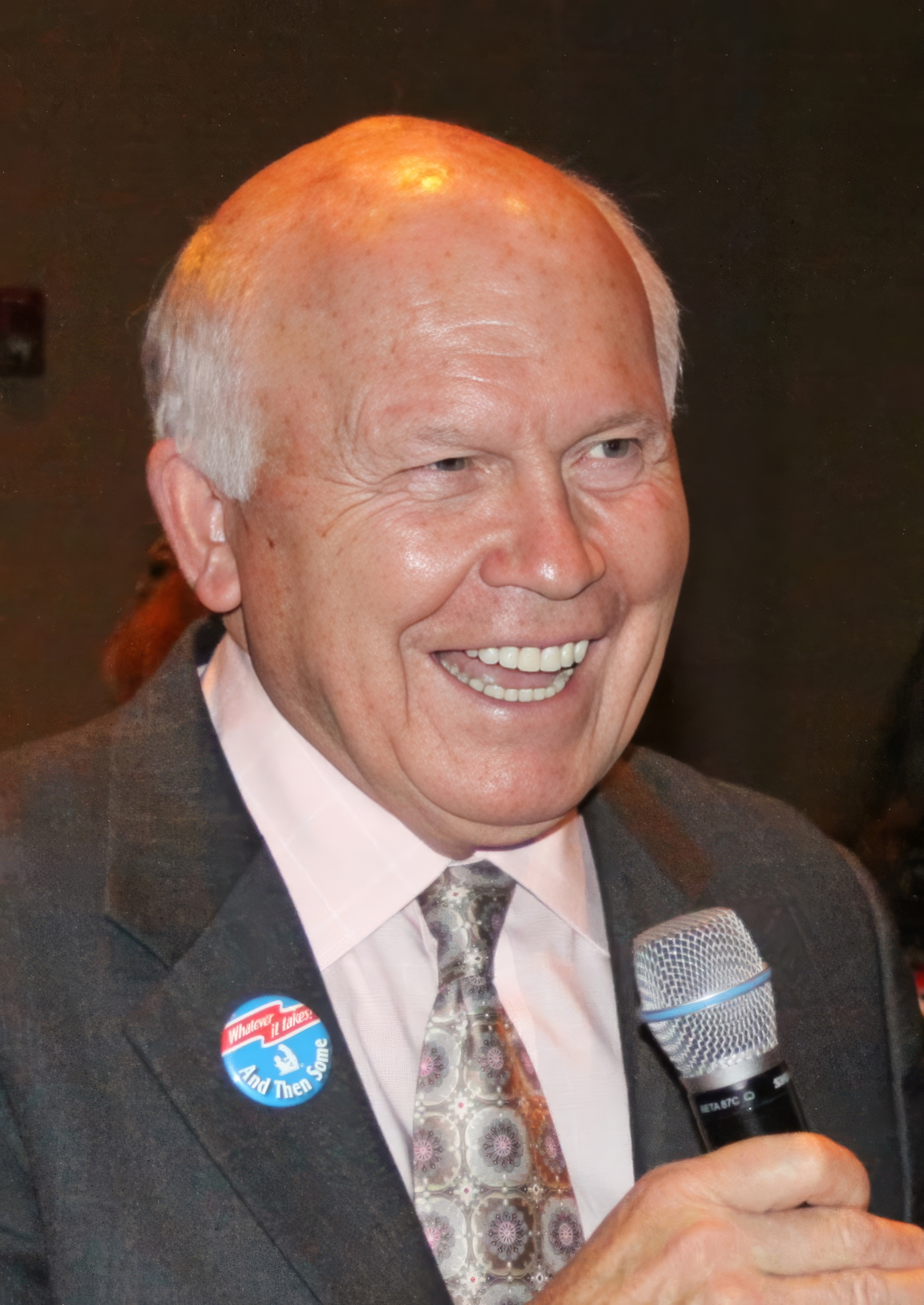
- Born: March 22, 1933 (age 93); Massachusetts, US
- Education: Walla Walla College; Oregon State University
- Spouse: Kathleen Marchant (d.2017)

Forrest Lee Preston (born March 22, 1933) is an American billionaire businessman. He is the founder, owner, chairman and chief executive officer (CEO) of Life Care Centers of America, a long-term elderly care company that he founded in 1970.

== Early life ==
Forrest Lee Preston was born and raised in Massachusetts, the son of a Seventh-day Adventist pastor father, Benjamin M. Preston and his wife Ethel Preston. His father died in 1994, and Preston endowed the Benjamin M. Preston scholarship at Atlantic Union College, of which his father was an alumnus.

He was educated at Walla Walla College and Oregon State University. His original intent was to become a medical doctor but he instead became a certified x-ray technician.

== Career ==
Preston moved to Cleveland, Tennessee, in the late 1950s a few years after his brother Winton Russell Preston, who had come to study at Southern Missionary College in nearby Collegedale.

Together with his brother Winton, he co-founded a company called Hospital Publications to create patient booklets and public relations materials for hospitals, and the company operated until 1972. The idea had come from his work in hospitals, where he concluded that there was a need for better public relations in the healthcare system. Through this business, he observed the conditions of elderly patients in hospitals, and concluded that there was a need for better long-term care.

In 1970, Preston founded Life Care Centers of America in Cleveland, and is the sole owner, chairman and CEO. It later grew to be the largest privately owned long-term care facility chain and the third largest privately owned long-term care facility in the United States.

As of September 2015, he had an estimated net worth of US$2.1 billion.

== Personal life ==
Preston was married to Kathleen Marchant (1936–2017) until her death. He lives in Cleveland. His residence is located near the residence of fellow businessman Allan Jones. He is of the Baptist faith, and attends First Baptist Church in Cleveland.

He married Kim Phuong Nguyen, his former caretaker, in 2018. In October 2024 his son Aubrey filed a legal complaint against Kim and her family over his father's finances.
