= John McCracken =

John McCracken may refer to:

- John McCracken (artist) (1934–2011), American minimalist artist
- John McCracken (historian) (1938–2017), Scottish historian and Africanist

== See also ==
- John Henry MacCracken (1875–1948), American academic administrator
