= Life Care Centers of America =

American operator of elderly care facilities

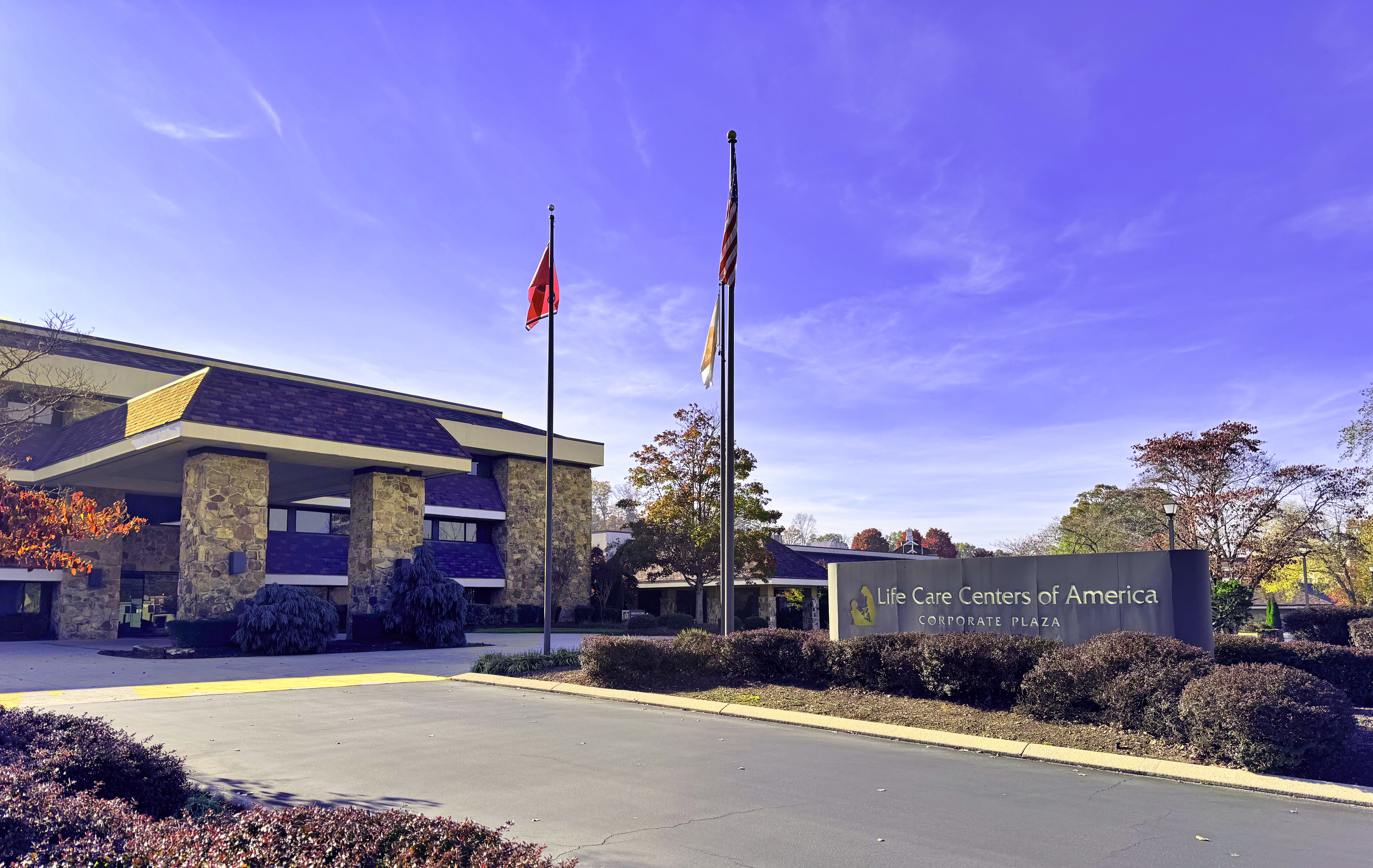
- Corporate plaza in Cleveland, Tennessee
- Company type: Private
- Industry: Elderly Healthcare
- Founded: 1970 in Cleveland, Tennessee
- Founder: Forrest Preston
- Headquarters: 3570 Keith Street; Cleveland, Tennessee, United States
- Number of locations: 256
- Number of employees: 42,000 (2015)
- Website: lcca.com

Life Care Centers of America is the largest privately held long-term elderly care company in the U.S., with facilities across 27 states, and the third largest in the U.S. It is headquartered in Cleveland, Tennessee. According to data from the Centers for Medicare & Medicaid, Life Care Centers of America operates 254 nursing homes with 32,966 beds.

== History ==
Life Care Centers of America was founded by Forrest Preston in 1970, and he remains the sole owner, chairman, and CEO.

Since 1995, the company's headquarters have been located at the Campbell Center at 3001 Keith Street NW in Cleveland in the location of a former shopping mall.

As of 2015, the company employs 42,000 people.

=== Medicare fraud ===
In 2016, Life Care agreed to pay $145 million to resolve allegations of over-billing the government for unnecessary or unreasonable rehabilitation services in violation of the False Claims Act. Between January 1, 2006, and February 28, 2013, Life Care submitted fraudulent claims for rehabilitation therapy by engaging in a systematic effort to increase its Medicare and Tricare billings. It was the largest settlement with a skilled nursing facility chain in DOJ history. The suit combined complaints by two separate whistleblowers under the qui tam provision of the Act.

== Outbreaks during the COVID-19 pandemic ==
=== Kirkland, Washington outbreak ===
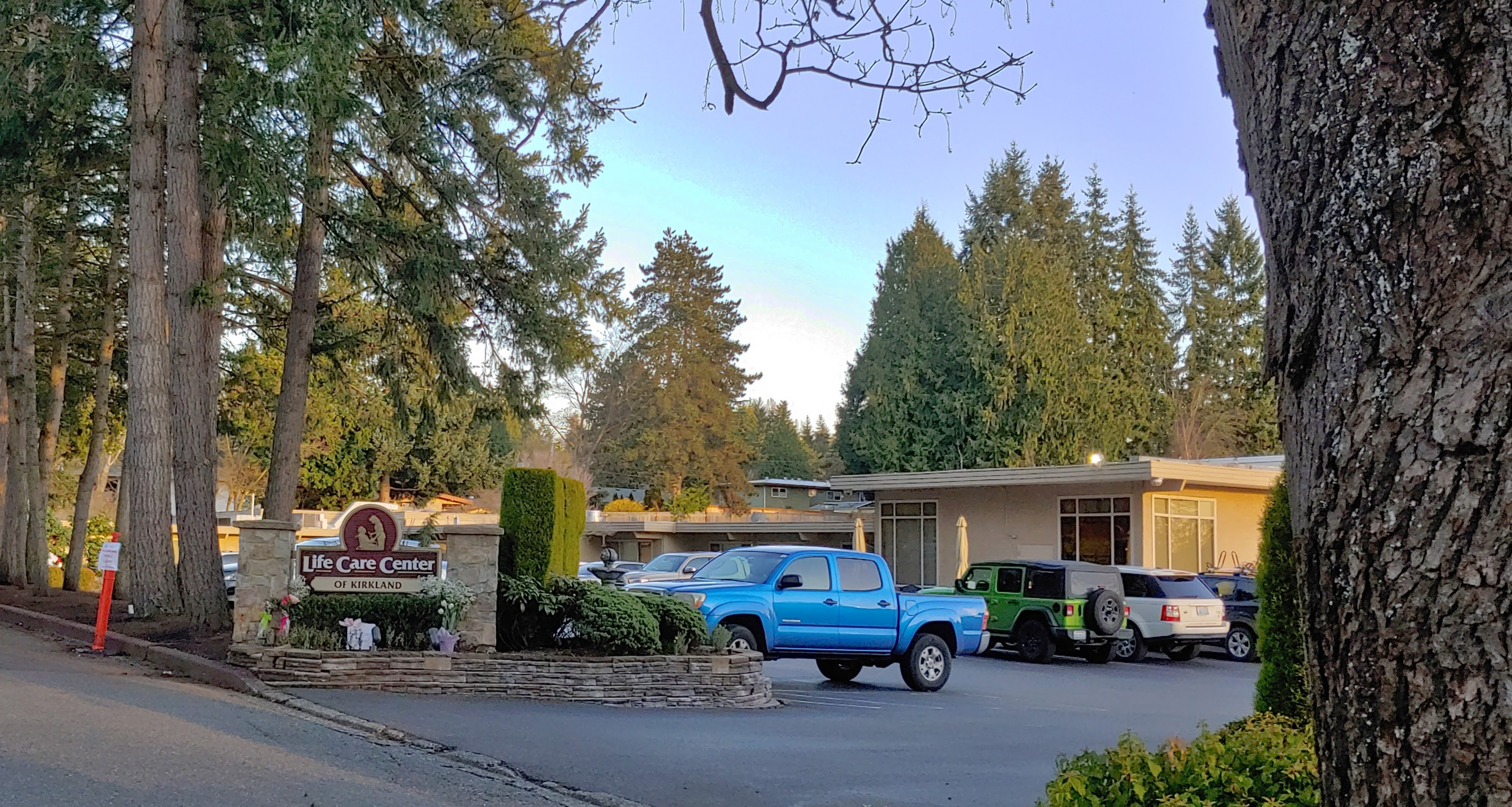
Life Care Center of Kirkland in 2020

A Life Care Center facility in Kirkland, Washington was the source of a major outbreak of COVID-19 first reported on February 19, 2020, which became the first outbreak in a United States nursing home. On February 19 there were 120 residents and 180 Center employees at the facility. By March 18, 101 of the residents had been diagnosed with COVID-19, and thirty-four residents had died, for a case fatality rate of 33.7%. On April 2, 2020, Life Care Center was fined $611,000 for deficiencies in its response to the outbreak, and has until September 16, 2020, to correct the deficiencies, or else face termination of its participation in the Medicare/Medicaid program.

On February 19, 2020, the first resident was transferred to a local hospital; this resident would test positive for COVID-19. Two residents died on the 26th who would be later confirmed to have had the virus, with the first death being reported on the 29th.

By March 2, three deaths of the six in Washington state were attributed to the location. The center was closed to visitors on the 2nd, with residents encouraged to stay in their rooms. At the time, at least four additional residents and an employee had tested positive for the virus, and over 50 residents and employees were reporting symptoms. Twenty-five of Kirkland's firefighters were in isolation, as they had visited the facility, and two police officers, 17 nursing students and 4 staff from Lake Washington Institute of Technology had been potentially exposed and were being monitored. The Institute of Technology closed its 7,000-student campus for a cleaning and canceled meetings and events.

By March 5, at least 13 residents and 2 workers had tested positive for COVID-19. The death toll in the state had risen to nine with six of the deaths being confirmed to be from residents at the center. The following day gave updated numbers of 18 residents and six workers who were infected with a further 10 cases linked to the site being non-residents who visited the location. Of the 11 deaths in the state, 10 of them were connected with the center.

On March 7, a press conference was held by the center. Of the 180 employees at the center, 70 of them showed symptoms of the virus and had been asked to remain at home. The number of residents still at the facility was down to 63 with 54 residents having already been transported to local hospitals over the course of the outbreak. At this point, 26 residents had died since the outbreak started; with 11 dying at the Center and 15 dying at hospitals in the area. Only 13 of the 15 hospital deaths were confirmed to be from COVID-19 with the causing of the remaining 2 hospital deaths being unconfirmed along with the deaths at the center. All remaining 63 residents at the center were confirmed to be confined in their rooms with six residents showing symptoms. Additionally, it was revealed that the center had received 45 testing kits for COVID-19 on the 5th. In addition to help from the CDC, The U.S. Department of Health and Human Services sent additional medical personnel to the facility.

On March 8, four more residents were transported to hospitals with four others leaving the Center entirely leaving 55 residents at the center. Two deaths from the 6th and 7th were confirmed to be residents from the center, bring the total number of deaths the virus was responsible for to 16 at the center. Further information on the 9th revealed that three previous deaths (one on the 4th, two on the 8th) had been caused by coronavirus, bringing the total to 19. Additionally, the center received a second batch of kits which would be enough to test all remaining residents in addition to testing those who died at the center. 44 of the remaining 55 have been tested. Of the 70 employees with symptoms, three have been hospitalized with one testing positive for the virus. However, the Center does not have enough kits at this time to test all employees. It was revealed over the course of the day that the residents cannot take showers due to the conditions of the quarantine and the lack of showers in the residents' rooms, in addition to the Center staffing being down to three employees covering for the night of the 3rd to the morning of the 4th. In addition, the staff had inadequate personal protective equipment, and were using bag valve masks which are known to increase dispersion of airborne particles.

==== COVID-19 mortality: March 12–23 ====
- March 12: King County COVID-19 cumulative deaths associated with Life Care Center of Kirkland totalled 22.
- March 13: King County COVID-19 cumulative deaths associated with Life Care Center of Kirkland totaled 25.
- March 14: King County COVID-19 cumulative deaths associated with Life Care Center of Kirkland totaled 27.
- March 15: King County COVID-19 cumulative deaths associated with Life Care Center of Kirkland totaled 29.
- March 17: King County COVID-19 cumulative deaths associated with Life Care Center of Kirkland updated to 30.
- March 18: King County COVID-19 cumulative deaths associated with Life Care Center of Kirkland totaled 35.
- March 23: King County COVID-19 cumulative deaths associated with Life Care Center of Kirkland totaled 37.
- March 24: King County COVID-19 cumulative death reports ceased to break out those associated with Life Care Center of Kirkland.

=== Littleton, Massachusetts outbreak ===
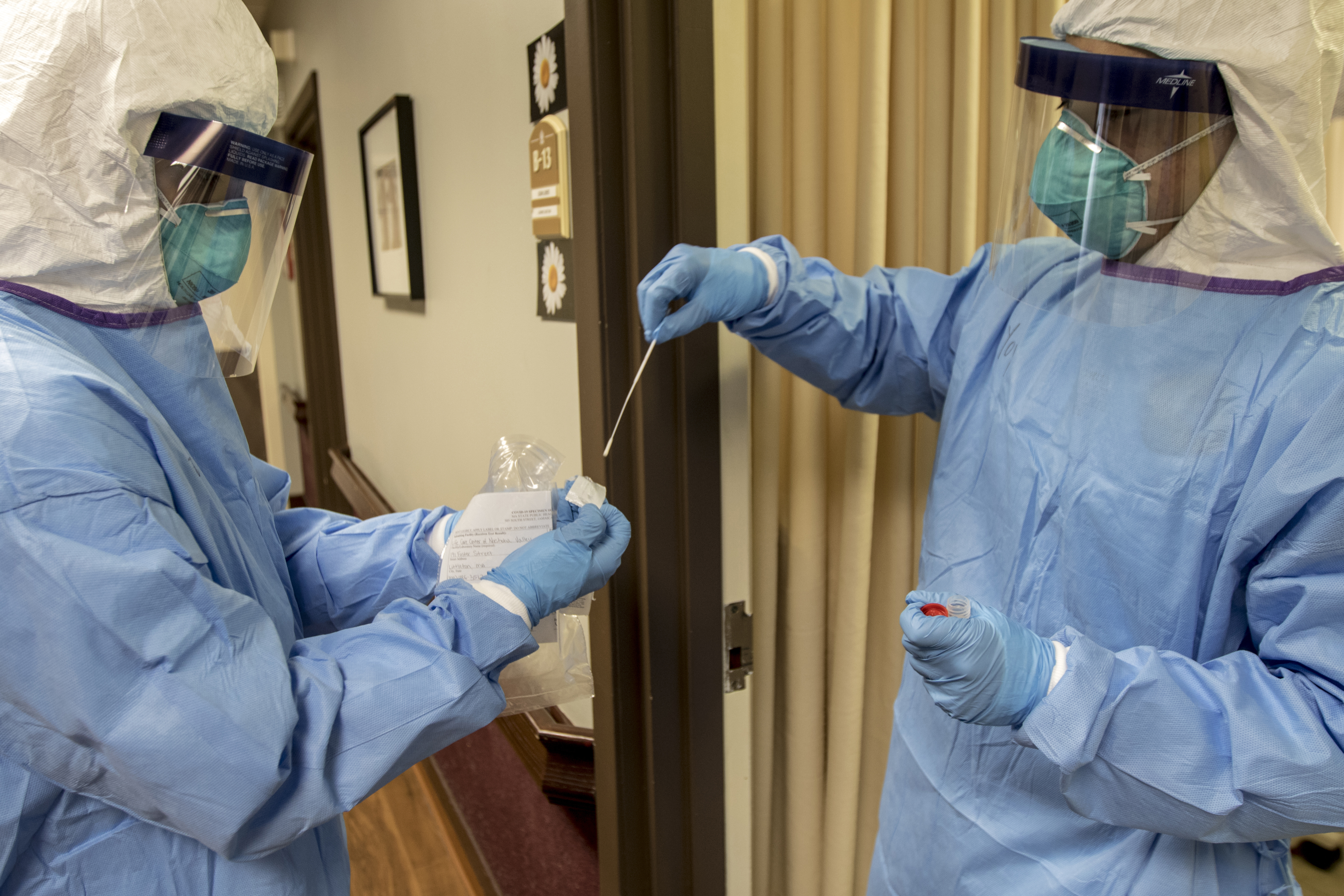
A medic with the Massachusetts National Guard takes a nasal swab that will be used to test for COVID-19 with a resident of the Life Care Center of Nashoba Valley, April 3, 2020

Life Care Center of Nashoba Valley in Littleton, Massachusetts, experienced an outbreak of COVID-19 in April 2020. The nurse who reported the outbreak later died of the virus.
