= Alan J. Lacy =

American businessman

- Born: Alan J. Lacy; October 19, 1953 (age 72); Cleveland, Tennessee
- Occupations: Businessman, executive
- Known for: Leading Sears, Roebuck & Co

Alan J. Lacy (born October 19, 1953) was the last chairman and CEO of Sears, Roebuck and Company, which was acquired by Kmart in 2005, at which point he became Vice Chairman of that organization.

== Early life and education ==
Lacy was born in Cleveland, Tennessee. He graduated from Cleveland High School in 1971. Lacy earned a BS in Industrial Management from the Georgia Institute of Technology in 1975 and an MBA from Emory University in 1977.

== Career ==
Lacy joined Sears in 1994 and served in a number of senior positions, including Chief Financial Officer, President-Credit and President-Services before being named CEO in 2000. He became CEO of Sears Holdings Corporation following the 2005 acquisition of Sears by Kmart Holdings and Vice Chairman prior to his departure in 2006.

In addition to the sale of Sears to Kmart, Lacy's accomplishments included the acquisition of Lands' End, the sale of Sears credit operation to Citigroup and significant restructuring actions. Despite the competitive challenges Sears faced during his tenure as CEO, Sears' share price significantly outperformed the overall market and a number of key competitors (e.g. Wal-Mart and Home Depot). Prior to Sears, Lacy was in senior management positions with Kraft Foods and its former parent company Altria Group.

Lacy has served as a director of Bristol-Myers Squibb Company, Fidelity Funds (trustee), The Western Union Company, Sears, Roebuck and Co., Sears Holdings Corporation, Sears Canada Inc., the Economic Club of Chicago, and the National Retail Federation. He was a member of the Business Roundtable. He has also served as chairman of the Board of Dave and Buster's Entertainment, Inc. and as Senior Adviser to Oak Hill Capital Partners.

His non-profit activities include having served as a trustee of the Chicago Botanic Garden, the Lyric Opera of Chicago, the Field Museum of Natural History and as a director of the Center for Advanced Study in the Behavioral Sciences at Stanford University. He is a former trustee and board Chair of the National Parks Conservation Association. and trustee of the California Chapter of The Nature Conservancy.
