= Tom Rowland (politician) =

American politician

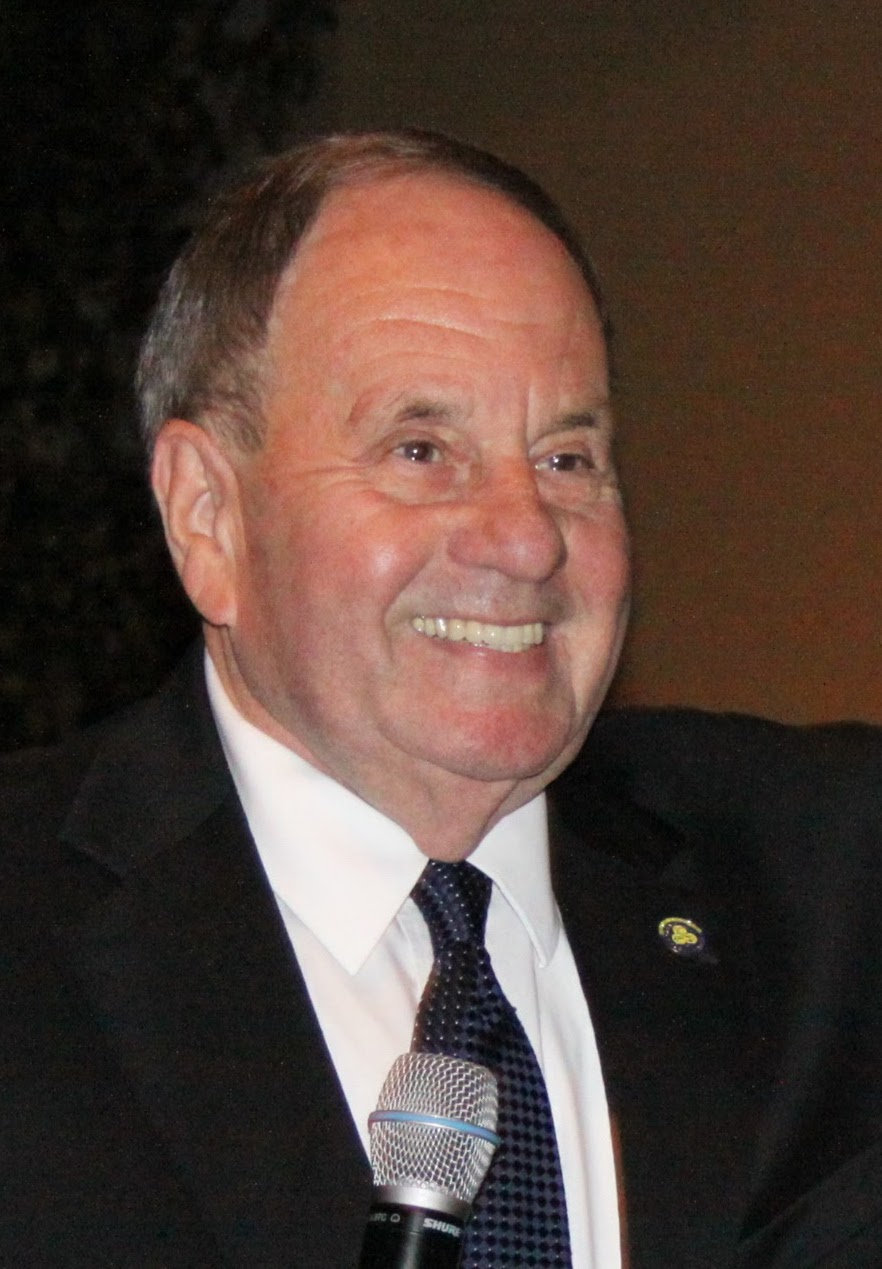

Mayor of Cleveland, Tennessee
- In office September 9, 1991 – 2017
- Preceded by: Bill Schultz
- Succeeded by: Kevin Brooks

Personal details
- Born: November 22 Safety Harbor, Florida
- Spouse: Sandra Rowland

Tom Rowland is an American politician who was the mayor of Cleveland, Tennessee. He was the longest-serving big city mayor in Tennessee history.

== Early life and broadcast career ==
Rowland was born in Safety Harbor, Florida. His father worked in the hotel business, so he grew up moving between various southeastern states and attended C. E. Byrd High School in Shreveport, Louisiana. As a child, Rowland knew he wanted to be in the radio business and started work at KWKH. He later moved to Barksdale, Mississippi, and won contests to speak on major radio stations in Knoxville and Memphis, Tennessee.

Rowland served as an airborne radio operator in the United States Air Force and attended the University of Tennessee. For a while he worked at WDEH in Sweetwater, Tennessee, before moving to WCLE in Cleveland in 1963, which he later managed and purchased. He also recorded campaign commercials for Georgia Governor Carl Sanders.

In 1969, Rowland met his wife Sandra while covering a news story in Polk County, Tennessee. Sandra was managing editor of the Cleveland Daily Banner newspaper. In 1980, Rowland received the Associated Press Broadcaster of the Year award.

== Cleveland mayorship ==
Rowland was appointed fire commissioner for the City of Cleveland and a few months later retiring mayor Bill Schultz asked Rowland to run for mayor. Rowland was elected in 1991 and served 26 years as mayor. During his tenure Cleveland's population grew from over 30,000 to approximately 45,000. Cleveland became the sixteenth-largest city in Tennessee and had the fifth-largest industrial economy in the state. Rowland retired from the position in 2018.

Rowland worked to establish Museum Center at Five Points and the Cleveland Regional Jetport during his tenure. He helped implement Cleveland’s greenway system and worked to establish Red Clay State Historic Park. He revitalized the city’s former rail depot into a modern transportation hub and was a major advocate for bringing Amtrak rail service to Cleveland, which has not happened as of 2024.

Rowland and his wife were both offered positions in Tennessee's cabinet by Zach Wamp if Wamp’s 2010 gubernatorial bid had been successful. An interchange named for Rowland opened on APD-40 in 2017.

== See also ==
- List of mayors of Cleveland, Tennessee
