= Perry Stone =

American minister

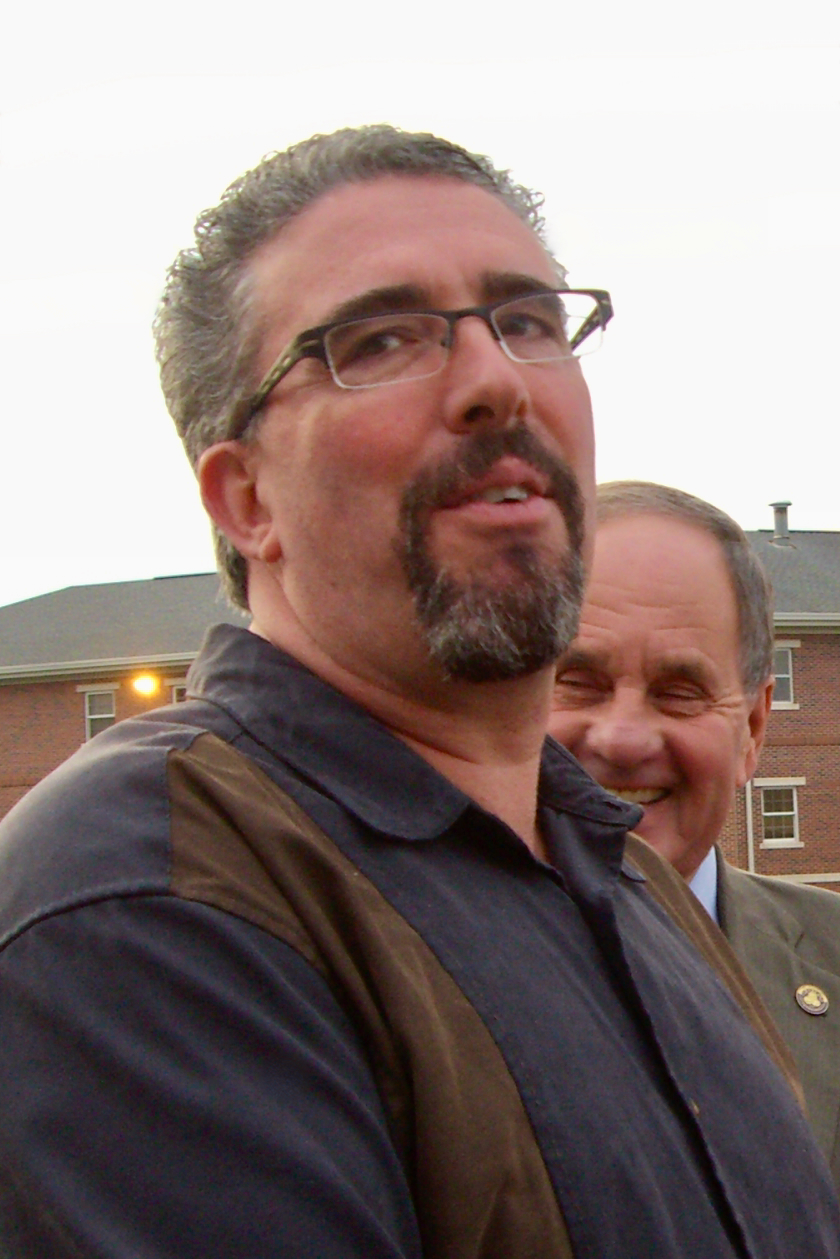
- Perry Stone circa 2008
- Born: June 23, 1959 (age 66); Parsons, West Virginia, U.S.
- Education: Lee University
- Occupation: Evangelist
- Website: perrystone.org

Perry Fred Stone Jr. (born June 23, 1959) is an American evangelist, end times teacher and author living in Cleveland, Tennessee. He has traveled preaching and teaching all over the world and on television. He often shares controversial teachings about the "end times", demon possession, the dangers of "foreigners" and about American politics and culture.

== Early life and education ==
Stone was born on June 23, 1959, in Parsons, West Virginia to Perry Fred Stone and Juanita Stone. He has three siblings: Diana Stone, Phillip Stone, and Melanie Stone (all of Cleveland, TN).

Stone attended Lee University and graduated with a B.A. in theology from Covenant Life Christian College, located in Rocky Top, Tennessee.

== Ministry ==
=== Influence ===
Stone began preaching at the age of 16. He credits Pentecostal minister T.L. Lowery, who pastored two Church of God congregations in Cleveland, Tennessee, and Washington, D.C., as his role model and mentor.

=== Ministries ===
Stone founded the Voice of Evangelism Outreach Ministries (VOE) in 1985. Parts of VOE include the Omega Center International (OCI) Conference Center, The Ramp@OCI Church, and the International School of the Word, an online school offering Bible classes. His weekly Manna-fest with Perry Stone TV program, which focuses on Biblical prophecy, began airing on the Trinity Broadcasting Network in 2000.

=== Theology ===
Stone teaches that taking Communion daily can bring emotional, physical, and spiritual healing.

Over the years, Stone has claimed to have received prophetic visions about significant events, such as George W. Bush being elected president, the 9/11 attack on the World Trade Center, and Osama Bin Laden's death. Stone has also taught and confirmed the belief that the Cherokee people possess a unique spiritual heritage associated with the Lost Tribes of Israel.

== Propagation of conspiracy theories ==
=== Terrorism ===
In December 2015, Stone claimed that ISIS had placed sleeper cells across the southeastern United States and that the organization had warehouses full of weapons in all fifty states.

=== Watergate ===
In a 2018 appearance on evangelist Jim Bakker’s television program, Stone claimed that a government intelligence officer, who was a member of his father's church in northern Virginia, possessed the true knowledge of the Watergate scandal. According to Stone, the person responsible for Watergate was still alive, and if the truth came out, it would destroy the Democratic party.

=== Donald Trump ===
In 2018, Stone claimed to have information about 64,000 emails that proved that the Democratic party conspired with Russia to defeat Donald Trump in the 2016 presidential election. He also accused anti-Trump Democrats of being demon possessed and of "trying to place hexes and curses" on Trump.

=== Globalism and Satanism ===
In a 2018 sermon, Stone pronounced his belief in a "deep state" of globalists who controlled the world's economy and religions. He also stated that an unnamed billionaire told him that globalist political leaders were Luciferians who prayed to Satan before dinner.

=== COVID-19 ===
In March 2020, Stone described the COVID-19 virus as God's punishment for abortion, the lack of prayer in public schools, and same-sex marriage. He also alleged that it was an attempt to eliminate older, conservative people in the southeastern United States who opposed the Mark of the Beast so that socialism and communism could take over the United States. Additionally, he said that a government supercomputer "666" was working on a cure. At the same time, Stone dismissed the virus as "media hype, God's retribution on the Chinese," and an excuse for the U.S. government "to implement widespread surveillance of citizens" via the implanting of a microchip that would serve as the Mark of the Beast.

== Controversies ==
=== Sexual misconduct allegations ===
In April 2020, the Voice of Evangelism board of directors reportedly received letters from eleven individuals, nine of whom were women connected to Stone's ministry, that detailed allegations of sexual harassment and assault. Actions stipulated in the letters included "groping, showing that he was aroused while fully clothed and rubbing himself, asking women in his ministry about their breasts, kissing the women on the neck and lips, asking them to kiss him in similar ways, messaging them to send him pictures and asking them to massage him." According to another report, Stone admitted to having "acted inappropriately with female employees," which he attributed to stress. Stone issued a statement that said, "I have asked God and my precious wife Pam to forgive me. And I humbly and sincerely ask those who are hurt or offended by my actions to also forgive me. It is my hope that by the grace of God we will all be able to walk in healing and restoration." The board of directors instructed Stone to take a sabbatical for actions "that deviated from the biblical standards set in place for VOE leadership." The forced sabbatical included "professional counseling, medical care, removal from social media and absence from ministry for between six and 12 months."

In December 2021, a Chattanooga, Tennessee, newspaper reported that the FBI was investigating Stone for the sexual misconduct allegations against him, his finances, and his connections to local law enforcement. Stone's ministry denied knowledge of this investigation, and Stone personally suggested that the media had concocted the story to drum up advertising revenue.

In April 2023, a Bradley County grand jury declined to charge Perry Stone following an investigation into allegations of sexual misconduct. The investigation was reviewed by the Tennessee Bureau of Investigation. Stone has denied any wrongdoing, attributing the allegations to his ministry's success and claiming that the accusers were seeking to damage his reputation.

== Personal life ==
Stone married his wife Pamela on April 2, 1982, in Northport, Alabama.
