= Lee University =

Private university in Cleveland, Tennessee, US

- Former names: Church of God Bible Training School (1918–1948); Lee College (1948–1997)
- Motto: "Where Christ is King"
- Type: Private university
- Established: 1918
- Religious affiliation: Church of God
- Endowment: $32.9 million (2024)
- President: Phil Cook
- Students: 3,680 (fall 2023)
- Location: Cleveland, Tennessee; 35°09′57″N 84°52′16″W
- Campus: 130 acres (53 ha); Suburban
- Newspaper: Lee Clarion
- Colors: Burgundy and navy blue
- Nickname: Flames
- Sporting affiliations: NCAA Division II – Gulf South
- Mascot: Flames
- Website: leeuniversity.edu
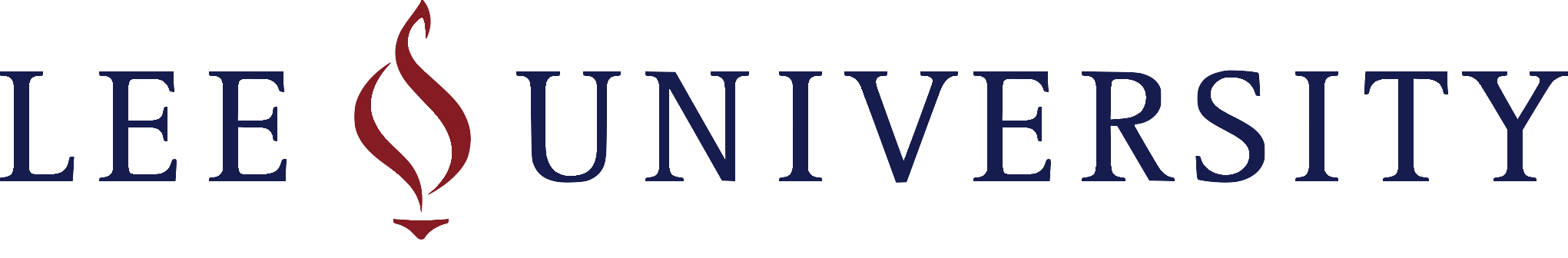

Lee University is a private Christian university in Cleveland, Tennessee, United States. It was founded in 1918 as the Church of God Bible Training School with twelve students and one teacher, Nora I. Chambers. The school grew to become Lee College, with a Bible college and junior college on its current site, in 1948. Twenty years later, Lee received accreditation by the Southern Association of Colleges and Schools as a four-year liberal arts college. In 1997, Lee became a university; it now offers master's degrees as well as undergraduate degrees.

== History ==
=== Bible training school ===
Lee University's current campus originally housed a Methodist institution, Centenary College and Music School, as early as 1885. Part of the original Centenary facility remains on campus today as part of Lee's administrative building.

In 1911, at its sixth annual General Assembly, the Church of God appointed a committee to establish plans for a Bible training school. Six years later, on January 1, 1918, the school's first term began with a tuition of $1 per week. Classes met in the council chamber of the Church of God Publishing House in Cleveland. Rev. A. J. Tomlinson served as the first superintendent of education. The only teacher, Nora Chambers, had twelve students.

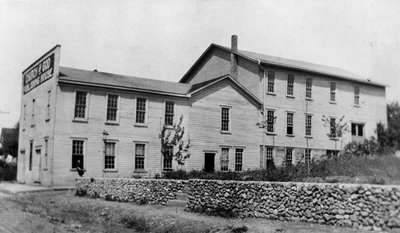
Lee's birthplace was in the Church of God Publishing House

In 1920, the school expanded to the old sanctuary of the North Cleveland Church of God on People street and included a dormitory. In 1925, it moved to a larger facility on Montgomery Avenue: the Church of God Auditorium. In 1930, the institution added a high school, school of business, and school of music. The school constructed its first building, a women's dormitory, in 1937, but the following year the school moved to a 63-acre campus in Sevierville, Tennessee, when it purchased the Murphy Collegiate Institute for $29,990. Intramural athletic teams began in the 1940s. In 1941, the school added a two-year junior-college to focus on teacher training and business education. The Vindagua yearbook began in 1942 and the Clarion student newspaper was first published in 1946.

=== Becoming Lee College ===
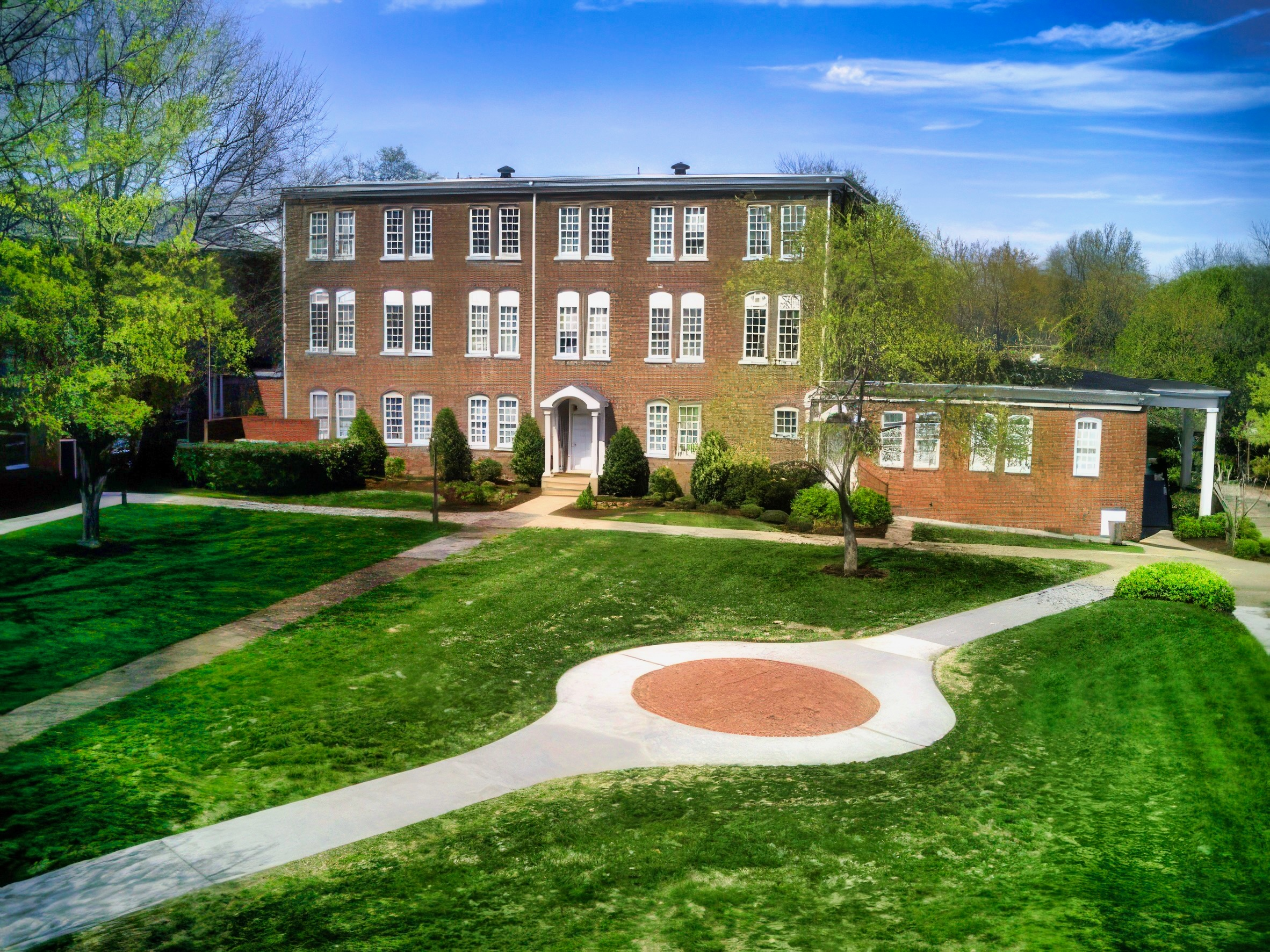
Centenary is the oldest extant building on Lee's campus

In 1947, Bob Jones College moved from Cleveland to Greenville, South Carolina. The Bible training school purchased the 20-acre campus for $1.5 million and the institution returned to Cleveland under a new name, Lee College, to honor its second president, Rev. F.J. Lee. After the move, the junior college received accreditation from the University of Tennessee. In 1958, Lee gained its first varsity sports team: men's basketball.

In 1960, the junior-college was accredited by the Southern Association of Colleges and Schools. The school adopted the Vikings mascot in 1961. Greek letter clubs began the following year. The annual Parade of Favorites pageant began in 1963. The first Lee Day was held in 1964. In 1965, Lee’s high school program closed and the school opened a science building. The following year Lee desegregated, reached an enrollment of 1,000, and started the shift to a four-year institution. The 1,800-seat Conn Center auditorium was constructed in 1977. In 1982, the college mascot became the Flames. The sports arena and library were built in 1983 and 1984 respectively.

=== Conn administration ===
Charles Paul Conn became president in 1986. He became the longest-serving president of any college or university in Tennessee history. During his tenure Lee’s enrollment quadrupled from around 1,000 to more than 5,100. In 1988, Lee closed Church Street on campus to create the Sharp Pedestrian Mall.

In the 1990s, Lee built a theatre, recreation center, music building, and college of education. In November 1993, the Ellis Hall dormitory was destroyed by arson in the middle of the night. All 73 students were evacuated. The Voices of Lee choir debuted in fall 1994. The next year Lee launched its first graduate program, church music. During the 1996 Summer Olympics in Atlanta, Lee housed more than 300 athletes and coaches participating in the games. In fall 1997, Lee became a university. The following year Lee established its Global Perspectives program, requiring all undergraduates to study abroad.

The 2000s brought a new student center, three-story humanities center, and school of religion building. In 2007, Lee launched its Encore program for students over 60 and purchased the former campus of Mayfield Elementary School. In 2010, Lee purchased the downtown campus of Cleveland's First Baptist Church for $5 million to house a performance venue, Pangle Hall, and the School of Business. A chapel and communications building were completed in the early 2010s. In 2013, a Lee University choir sang at the second inauguration of U.S. President Barack Obama. Lee began a School of Nursing in 2014 and finished a building for the department two years later. The university filed an amicus brief in favor of employment discrimination against LGBT people in the court case Bostock v. Clayton County in 2019. Enrollment waned in the wake of the COVID-19 pandemic and in 2023 the university closed all of its older, communal-style dorms for two years of renovations. Nora Chambers Hall remains closed as of 2025. The university suffered a cybersecurity data breach in March 2024. Groundbreaking on the university's new $15 million, 30,000-square-foot School of Engineering building is expected in summer 2025.

=== Presidents ===
1. Ambrose Jessup Tomlinson (1918–1922) [Church of God General Overseer (1909–1923)]
2. Flavius Josephus Lee (1922–1923) [Church of God General Overseer (1923–1928)]
3. J.B. Ellis (1923–1924)
4. T.S. Payne (1924–1930)
5. J. Herbert Walker, Sr. (1930–1935) [Church of God General Overseer (1935–1944)]
6. Zeno C. Tharp (1935–1944) [Church of God General Overseer (1952–1956)]
7. J. Herbert Walker, Sr. (1944–1945)
8. E.L. Simmons (1945–1948)
9. J. Stewart Brinsfield (1948–1951)
10. John C. Jernigan (1951–1952)
11. R. Leonard Carroll, Sr. (1952–1957) [Church of God General Overseer (1970–1972)]
12. R. L. Platt (1957–1960)
13. Ray H. Hughes, Sr. (1960–1966) [Church of God General Overseer (1972–1974; 1978–1982; 1996)]
14. James A. Cross (1966–1970) [Church of God General Overseer (1958–1962)]
15. Charles W. Conn (1970–1982) [Church of God General Overseer (1966–1970)]
16. Ray H. Hughes, Sr. (1982–1984)
17. R. Lamar Vest (1984–1986) [Church of God General Overseer (1990–1994; 2000–2004)]
18. Charles Paul Conn (1986–2020)
19. Mark L. Walker (2020–2024)
20. Charles Paul Conn (interim, 2024–2025)
21. Phil Cook (2025–present)

== Academics ==
Academic rankings

Master's
- Washington Monthly: 410 of 604

Regional
- U.S. News & World Report: 31 of 123

National
- WSJ/College Pulse: 494 of 500

The university is divided into six colleges and schools: the College of Arts & Sciences, the Helen DeVos College of Education, the School of Business, the School of Music, the School of Nursing, and the School of Theology and Ministry.

=== Academic programs ===
Many co-curricular activities, such as chapel attendance (offered twice per week; students are required to attend 70% of services a month), service requirements (10 hours per semester; 80 total hours to graduate), and the study abroad program, called Global Perspectives, are required as part of degree programs. Exceptions and special cases are approved by the relevant academic dean or the president of the university. All non-local entering freshmen are also required to live on campus, with exceptions made for those who are married, divorced, widowed, parents, over age 21, part-time, or living locally with immediate relatives.

== Athletics ==
The Lee athletic teams are called the Flames. The university is a member of the Division II level of the National Collegiate Athletic Association (NCAA), primarily competing in the Gulf South Conference (GSC) since the 2013–14 academic year.

Lee competes in 18 intercollegiate varsity sports: Men's sports include baseball, basketball, cheerleading, cross country, golf, soccer, tennis & track & field; while women's sports include basketball, cheerleading, cross country, golf, lacrosse, soccer, softball, tennis, track & field and volleyball. Club sports are offered such as boxing, men's and women's rugby, spikeball and ultimate frisbee.

== Campus ==
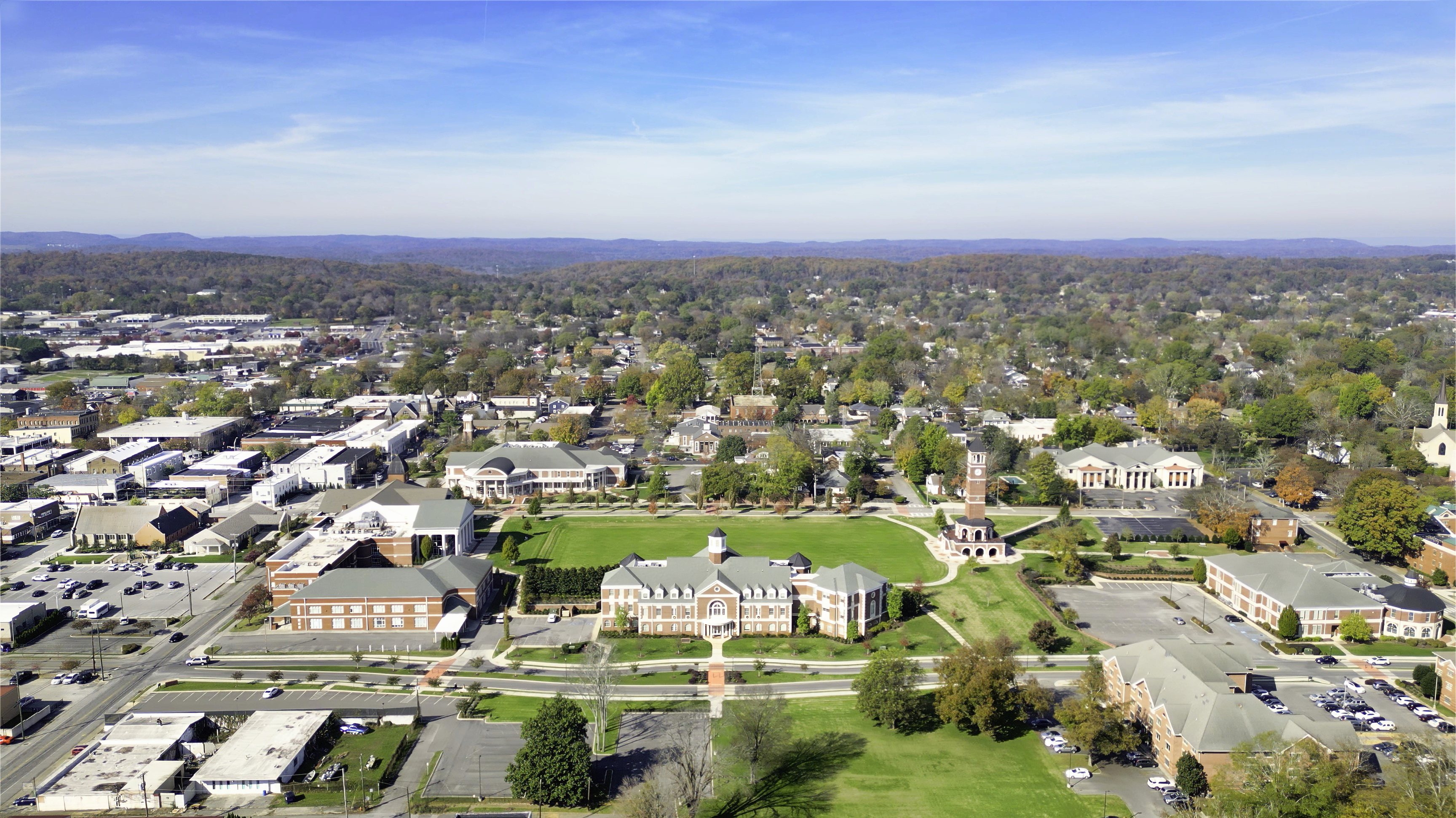
Aerial of Lee University's south campus

Lee University is located on a 120-acre (49 ha) campus in the town of Cleveland, Tennessee, which lies between Chattanooga and Knoxville.

== Student life ==
=== Community covenant ===
All students are asked to sign a "Community Covenant" which lists several restrictions on behaviors and social interaction according to the school's institutional and religious policy. Most notable are a substance policy barring alcohol, tobacco, and illegal drugs; and its stance on homosexuality, which is banned in all forms. Men's and women's dormitories are kept separate, and premarital sexual intercourse is prohibited. Immodesty and "occult practices" are also forbidden.

Lee University prohibits homosexual relationships for students.

=== Greek organizations ===
As of 2008, the university recognized ten Greek-letter organizations.

=== Publications ===
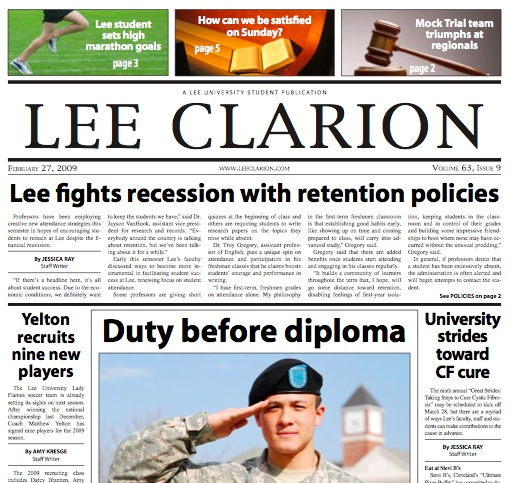
Lee University's student newspaper, the Lee Clarion, is published during the academic school year.

The Lee Clarion is the campus newspaper.

== Student body ==
Lee's enrollment is 5,370 students as of fall 2013, up from 960 in 1986.

== Notable alumni ==
- Candace Barley – youngest player to compete on the US national rugby team and play in international match; most-capped U20 player in the country
- Clark Beckham – runner-up of season 14 of American Idol
- Kevin Brooks – mayor of Cleveland and former state representative for Tennessee district 24.
- Nathan Chapman – Grammy award-winning record producer
- Charles Paul Conn – president of Lee University (1986–2020)
- Charles W. Conn – former Lee president, editor-in-chief of Pathway Press and General Overseer of the Church of God
- Christian A. Coomer – state representative from Georgia's 14th district, then judge of the Georgia Court of Appeals
- Raymond Culpepper – former General Overseer of the Church of God
- Jay DeMarcus – multi-instrumentalist/vocalist for Rascal Flatts
- Four Voices – 2002 world champion barbershop quartet
- Mark Harris – contemporary Christian soloist and member of 4 Him
- Dan Howell – member of the Tennessee House of Representatives.
- Marcus Lamb – founder of Daystar Television Network
- Ben Lobb – Canadian politician (Conservative Member of Parliament)
- J. Adam Lowe – Author and member of the Tennessee State Senate.
- Micah Massey – tied Grammy winner for Best Contemporary Christian Music Song "Your Presence is Heaven" with Israel Houghton
- G. Dennis McGuire – former General Overseer of the Church of God
- Stanley Nyazamba – former Columbus Crew soccer player
- Eric Phillips – current representative for the 48th District in the Virginia House of Delegates
- Ricardo Pierre-Louis – former MLS soccer player drafted in the second round (22nd overall) in the 2008 MLS SuperDraft by the Columbus Crew of Major League Soccer
- Barney Smith – museum curator
- Brooke Simpson – finalist on season 13 of The Voice
- Jordan Smith – winner of season 9 of The Voice
- Phil Stacey – American Idol finalist during the sixth season; tied for fifth place
- Scott Stapp – lead singer of the band Creed; kicked out of Lee for the use of marijuana (early 1990s)
- Todd Starnes – Fox News columnist and radio host
- Perry Stone (minister) – evangelist and author
- John Christopher Thomas – New Testament scholar, former President of the Society for Pentecostal Studies, editor of the Journal of Pentecostal Theology, author of eight books and many scholarly articles.
- Emma Waters – fertility policy analyst and author
- Lance Zawadzki – San Diego Padres 2007 draft pick, shortstop
