= Charles W. Conn =

American college president and writer

Dr. Charles William Conn
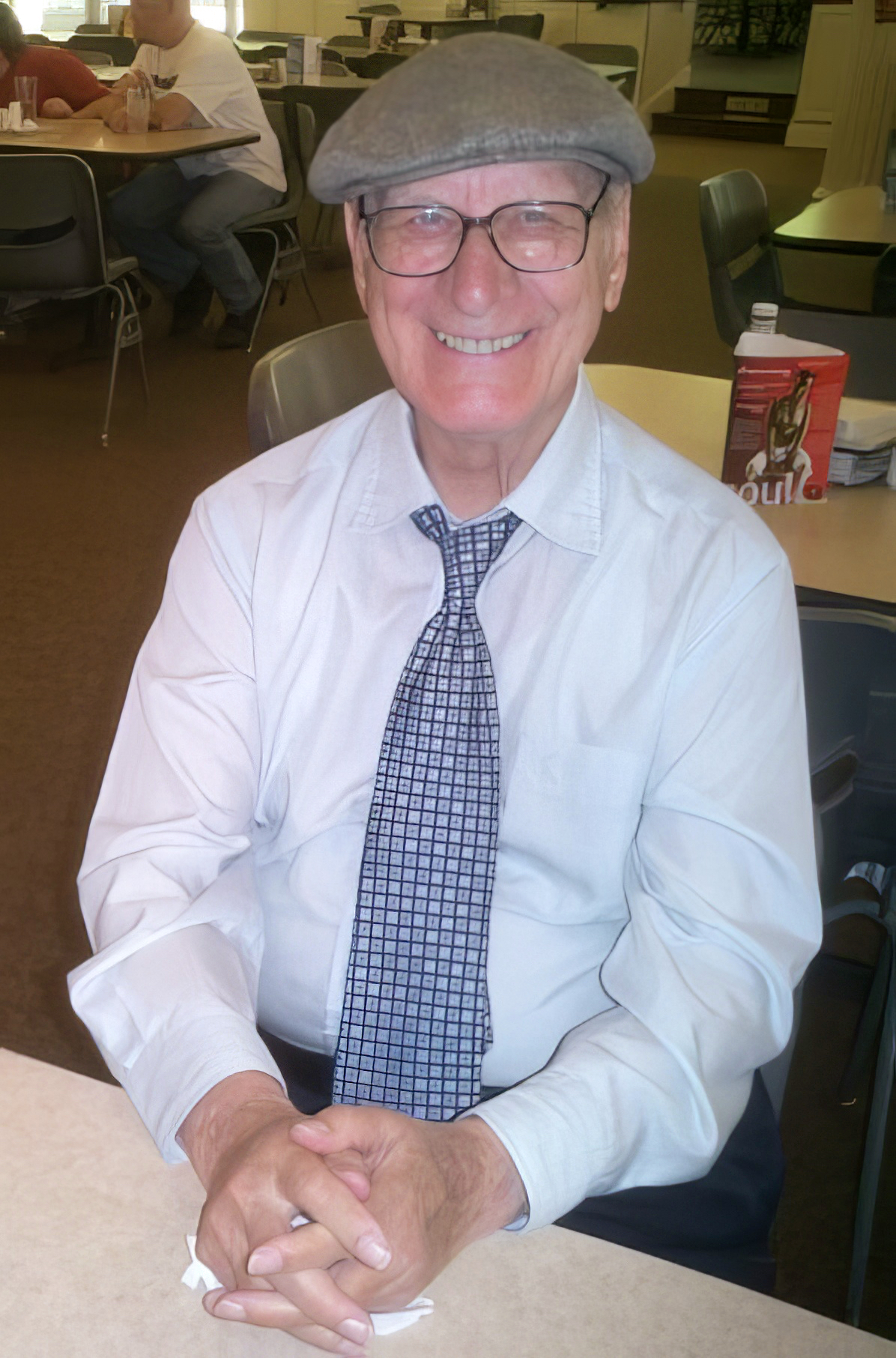

15th President of Lee University
- In office 1970–1982
- Preceded by: James A. Cross
- Succeeded by: Ray H. Hughes, Sr.

Personal details
- Born: January 20, 1920 Atlanta, Georgia
- Died: March 18, 2008 (aged 88) Chattanooga, Tennessee
- Spouse: Edna Minor Conn
- Children: Philip W. Conn, Sara Wesson (died 1970), J. Stephen Conn, Paul Conn, Sharon Hays, Raymond Conn, Camilla Warren, Mark Conn, Catherine Robbins, Bruce Conn, Jeffrey Conn, Melody Conn (died 1993)
- Education: Lee University
- Profession: University President, pastor, editor, administrator and educator

Dr. Charles William Conn (January 20, 1920 – March 18, 2008) was an American influential figure in the Church of God (Cleveland) whose responsibilities spanned a wide spectrum of positions throughout his ministerial career. He was a native of Riverside, Georgia, a suburb community of Atlanta, and the son of Albert Cason Conn and Belle Brimer Conn. He was married for 56 years to Edna Minor, who died in 1997, and they had twelve children: Philip, Sara, Stephen, Paul, Sharon, Raymond, Camilla, Mark, Catherine, Bruce, Jeffrey and Melody. His son Paul became the 18th president of Lee University.

He was president emeritus of Lee University, after serving 12 years (1970–82) as president of Lee College. He was an ordained minister in the Church of God, entering the clergy in 1940. He was general overseer of the Church of God for four years (1966–70) ) and editor-in-chief of Pathway Press for 10 years (1952–62).

== Early ministerial career ==
Conn accepted Christ on May 1, 1939, and united with the Riverside Church of God near Atlanta, where he was mentored by pastor G. R. Watson. He attended Lee University (then known as the Bible Training School in Sevierville, Tennessee) where he met Edna Minor, a student from Decatur, Alabama, whom he married on April 7, 1941.

Both felt a calling to full-time Christian ministry. After their marriage, they worked in numerous states in evangelism and youth ministry. Conn served as the Sunday school and youth director for the Church of God in Louisiana before moving to Missouri in 1942, where he and his wife served for six years as pastor of churches in St. Joseph and Leadwood. Conn authored 23 books, including Like a Mighty Army, Moves the Church of God, the official history of the Church of God, which was first published in 1955. This book has been revised and reissued three times since its initial release, as well as being published in several languages.

== Early writing career ==
A gifted writer from an early age, Conn first gained widespread attention within the denomination for his writing. He moved to Cleveland, Tennessee, in 1948 to become editor of The Lighted Pathway, a youth-oriented publication, and four years later became editor of the Church of God Evangel, which was at the time a weekly magazine serving as the official publication of the Church of God. During his period as editor, he was known for writing insightful and memorable editorials and columns, and developed a reputation throughout the denomination for his balanced and progressive leadership.

== National influence ==
He was elected to serve on the church’s highest administrative body, the Executive Committee, in 1962, where he began a four-year term as assistant general overseer. In 1966, the Church of God elected him to its top executive position. During the four-year tenure as general overseer which followed, he supervised the amalgamation into the denomination of the Bethel Church of Indonesia, which today accounts for 2.5 million members. He also directed the construction of a new headquarters building for the international church, moving its offices to the site at Keith and 25th Streets in Cleveland, Tennessee, which it occupies today. He also emphasized spiritual renewal and the creation of a general program of education to advance sound ministerial preparation, including the projection of a seminary, which was established in 1975. Conn helped foster within the Church of God an acceptance of educational pursuits and an acceptance of broader Christianity. He also emphasized the internationalization of the Church of God and visited each major area of the denomination during his tenure as general overseer. His ministry was characterized by his vision, integrity, and ability to connect with Church of God membership at the grassroots level.

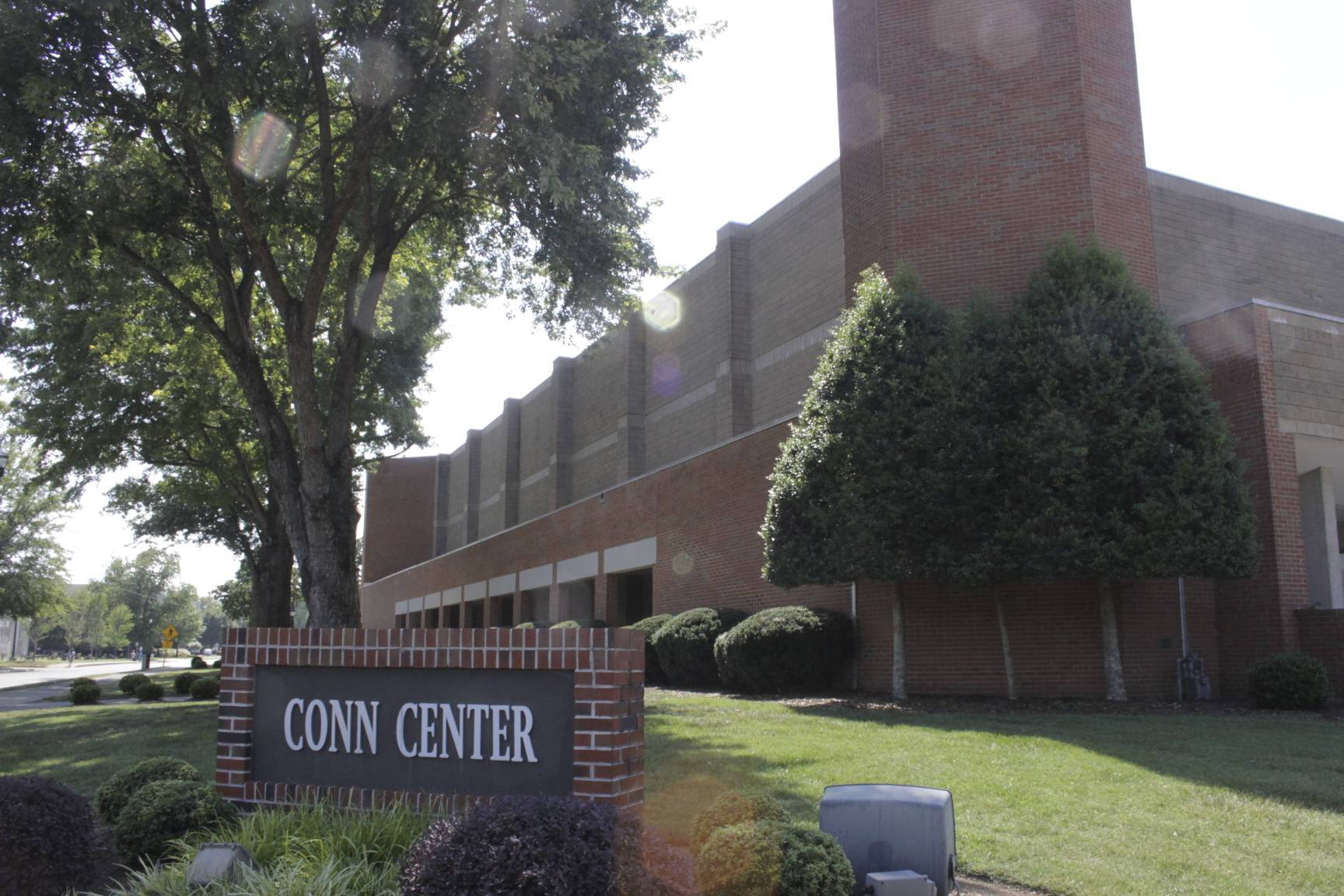
The Charles W. Conn Center at Lee University

His 12-year presidency of Lee College (now Lee University) was at that time the longest in the institution’s history. During the years of his leadership, the school set new enrollment records, built a married students apartment complex, and an auditorium, which was named the Charles W. Conn Center by the college board of directors in 1978, and made huge strides toward a broad range of academic and civic goals. He would later reflect on his teaching and administrative roles at Lee College as his most enjoyable years in ministry.

== Recognition ==
Among his numerous honors include being recognized by the denomination in 2002 with the inception of the Charles W. Conn Historical Writing Award, which biennially recognizes authors of outstanding books and articles related to the history and heritage of the Church of God. At that time, the denomination noted that "Charles W. Conn has symbolized the best of historical and literary writing in the Church of God for over 50 years.... [His] writings are the standard by which future historical writings will be judged." In 2003 Lee University established the Charles W. Conn Servant Leadership Scholarship to emphasize the importance of serving others and recognize students who demonstrate an outstanding commitment to service during their time at Lee. In addition, students who receive this scholarship give a portion of the proceeds to a charity of their choice. Each of these honors reflects the life and ministry of Dr. Conn and help continue his legacy among a new generation.

Conn's interests included classical music, literature, history, world travel, photography, and writing poetry.

Conn died Tuesday, March 18, 2008, in a Chattanooga, Tennessee, hospital, following a heart attack which he suffered four days earlier.

== Career in the Church of God ==
United as a member: Riverside Church of God near Atlanta, Georgia, 1939

First Licensed: September 16, 1940 - Ordained: March 28, 1946

Sunday School and Youth Director of Louisiana, 1940–1941

Pastorates: St. Joseph, Missouri (1942–1944) Leadwood, Missouri (1944–1948)

Director of Sunday School and Youth Literature, 1948–1952

Editor of The Lighted Pathway, 1948–1952

Editor-In-Chief of Church of God Publications, 1952–1962

Executive Council, 1952–1960; 1962–1974; 1976–1980; 1982–1984; 1986–1990

General Executive Committee, 1952–1956; 1962–1970

Public Relations Director, 1960–1962

Radio and Television Board, 1962–1964

Executive Director of Ministry to the Military, 1962–1966

Assistant General Overseer, 1962–1966

National Laymen’s Board, 1964–1966

General Overseer, 1966–1970

President of Lee College, 1970–1982

Overseer of Virginia, 1982–1984

Official Historian of the Church of God, 1977–2008

Centennial Commission, Chairman 1980-1986

== Interdenominational career ==
Presidium, Pentecostal World Conference (now the Pentecostal World Fellowship), 1966–1970

Executive Committee, Pentecostal Fellowship of North America (now the Pentecostal-Charismatic Churches of North America), 1962–1970

Board of Directors, National Association of Evangelicals, 1966–1970

== Books by Charles W. Conn ==
Like A Mighty Army, Moves the Church of God (1955)

Pillars of Pentecost (1956)

The Evangel Reader: Selections from the Church of God Evangel, 1910-1958 (1958)

Where The Saints Have Trod: A History of Church of God Missions (1959)

The Rudder and the Rock (1960)

The Bible: Book of Books (1961)

A Guide To The Pentateuch (1963)

Christ and the Gospels (1964)

A Certain Journey (1965)

Acts of the Apostles (1965)

Why Men Go Back: Studies in Defection and Devotion (1966)

A Survey of the Epistles (1969)

The Pointed Pen: The Maxims of Charles W. Conn (1973)

Highlights of Hebrew History (1975)

A Balanced Church (1975)

What is the Church? (1975)

The Relevant Record (1976)

Like A Mighty Army: A History of the Church of God, 1886-1976 (Revised Edition 1977)

Poets and Prophets of Israel (1981)

Cradle of Pentecost: North Cleveland Church of God (1981)

The Anatomy of Evil (1981)

Images of a People: An Album of Church of God History (1986)

Our First 100 Years, 1886-1986: A Retrospective (1986)

The Living Book: A Disciples Guide to Understanding the Bible (1989)

When Your Upright World Turns Upside Down: Coping with the Tragedies of Life (1990)

Like A Mighty Army: A History of the Church of God, 1886-1995 (Definitive Edition 1996)
