= Charles Paul Conn =

American university president

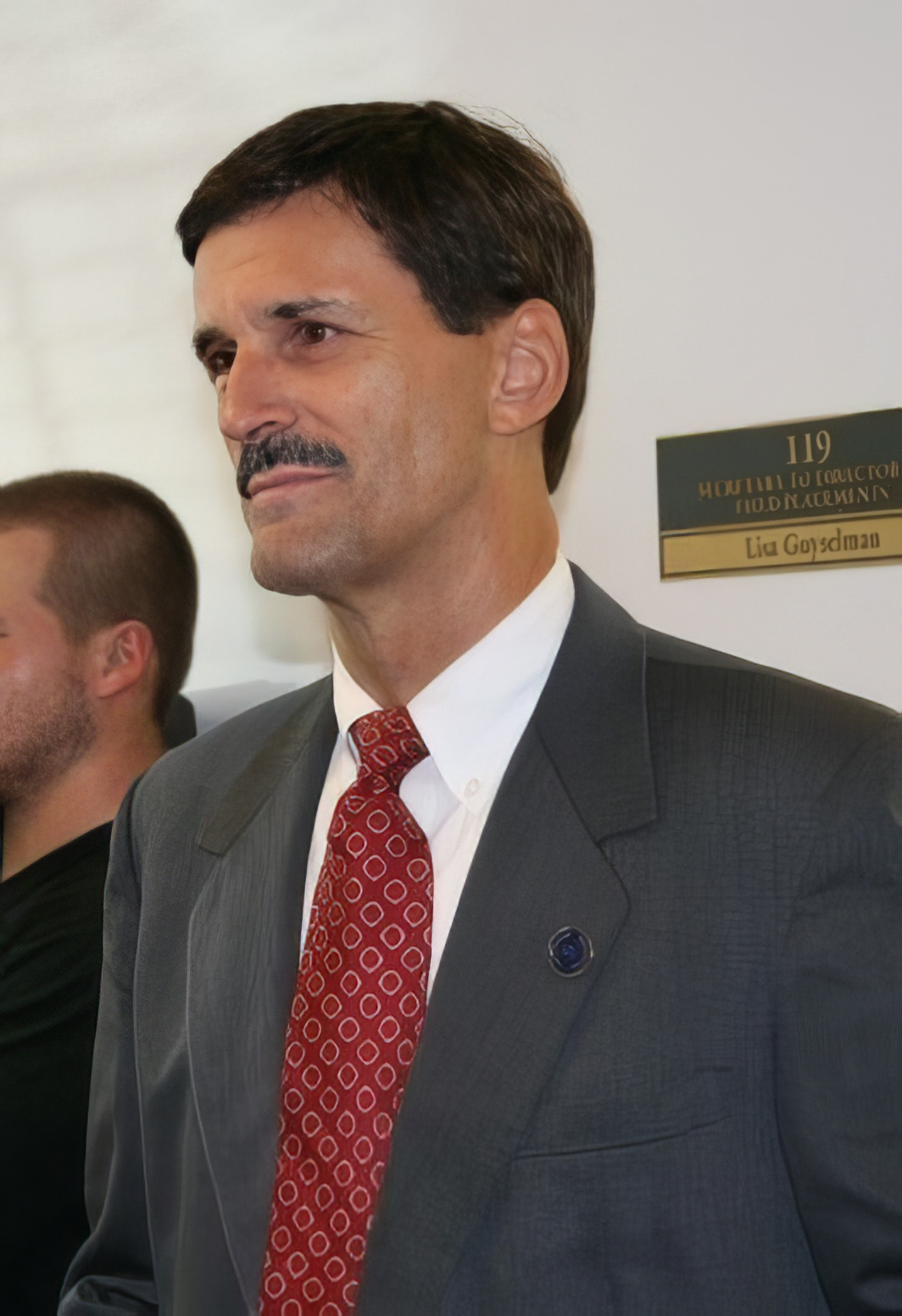

18th and 20th President of Lee University
- In office 1986-2020 – 2024-2025
- Preceded by: R. Lamar Vest
- Succeeded by: Mark Walker, Phil Cook

Personal details
- Born: December 23, 1945 (age 80)
- Spouse: Darlia Conn
- Education: Lee University; Emory University
- Profession: University president, Professor, author
- Website: www.leeuniversity.edu/president/

Charles Paul Conn (born December 23, 1945) is Chancellor of Lee University in Cleveland, Tennessee. He was the longest serving CEO of any college or university in Tennessee history. Conn served as president of Lee University from 1986 to 2019 before retiring to become chancellor. He returned as the school's interim president for the 2024-2025 academic year before resuming his position as chancellor.

== Early life and education ==
Conn was born in Missouri and moved to Cleveland when he was around two years old. He was one of 12 children in his family. He attended Bradley Central High School where he was elected president and edited the school newspaper. Conn worked as a paperboy for the Cleveland Daily Banner and wrote sports for the paper while in school.

He acquired his undergraduate degree in religion from Lee University (then Lee College) in 1967. He received an M.A. and a Ph.D. in psychology from Emory University (Atlanta, GA) and subsequently spent eight semesters in post-doctoral study at Harvard University in the Graduate School of Education. He was a visiting scholar at Harvard Divinity School in 1982.

After Conn graduated from Lee, his father, Charles William Conn, became the college's 15th president.

== Career ==
Conn began his career at Lee College in 1971 as a professor in the psychology faculty and chair of the Department of Behavioral Sciences. He was appointed Vice President of Institutional Advancement in 1984 and President of Lee College (now Lee University) in 1986. He continues teaching in the Department of Behavioral and Social Sciences, and served a term as Visiting Professor of Psychology at Appalachian State University.

Conn worked as a local treasurer for the Jimmy Carter 1976 presidential campaign. He later declined an invitation from the Tennessee Democratic Party to compete against incumbent Don Sundquist in the 1998 Tennessee gubernatorial election. He has described himself as an independent centrist.

Conn has served on the Southern Association of Colleges and Schools Commission on Colleges, holding positions as commissioner, member of the Executive Committee, and member of the Appeals Committee. He served from 2007 to 2010 on the national board of directors of the Council of Independent Colleges. He has also held positions with the Appalachian College Association, the Council for Christian Colleges and Universities, the Southern States Athletic Conference, and the Tennessee Independent Colleges and Universities Association. Conn declined invitations to become president of Grand Valley State University and Oral Roberts University.

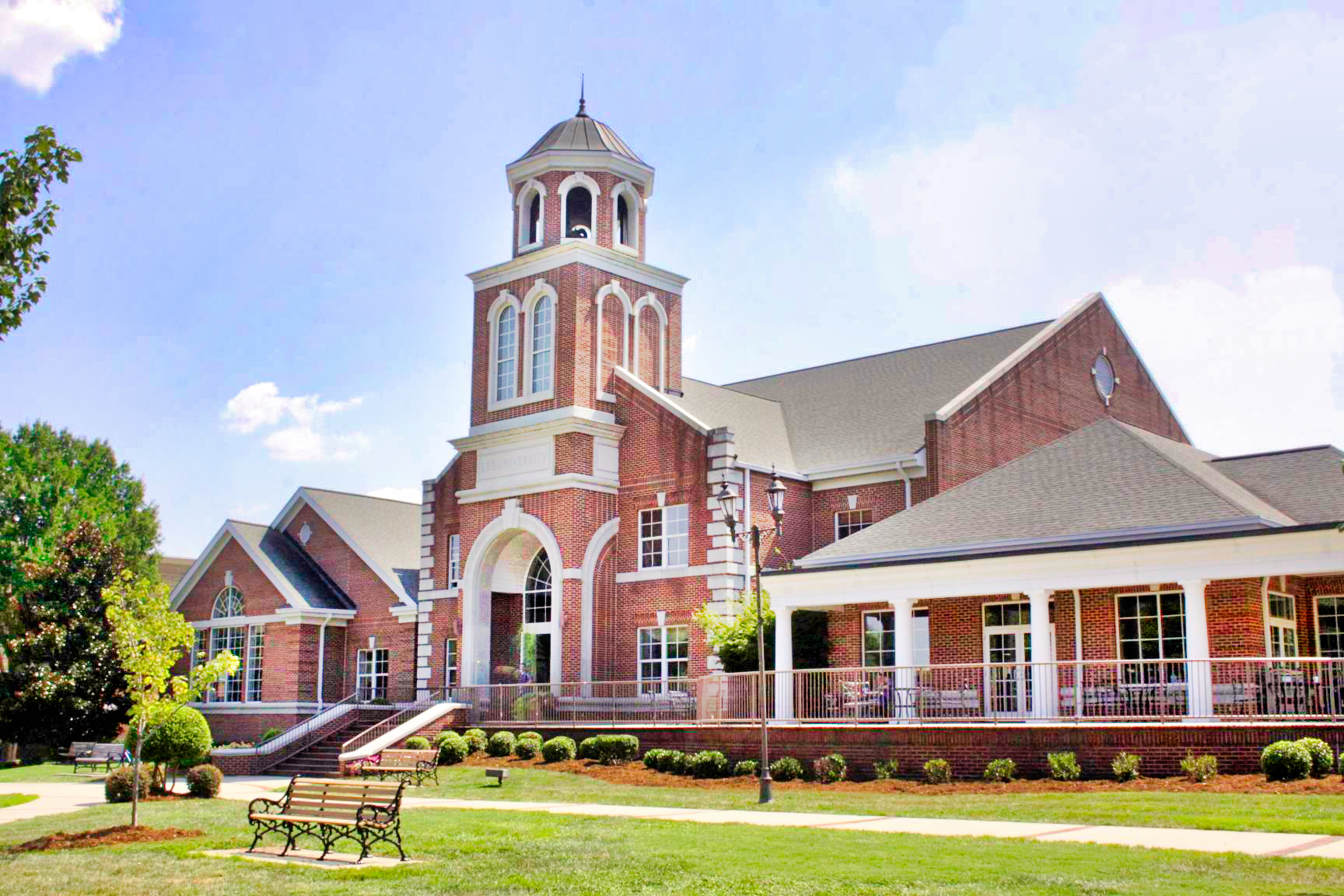
The Paul Conn Student Union at Lee University

The number of undergraduate degree programs offered by Lee quadrupled under Conn's tenure. In 1986, the college offered 22 programs of undergraduate study; by 2020, the number was 159. The college became a university, offering master and doctoral programs for the first time. The school's hallmark service learning and global perspectives initiatives launched during his tenure. Enrollment quintupled from 1,000 to 5,000 students and the campus expanded from 22 acres to 120. Conn convinced the city council to close part of Church Street, establishing a central pedestrian mall on campus. More than 30 campus buildings were constructed during his tenure, including the Dixon Center theater, DeVos Recreation Center, Curtsinger Music Building, Deacon Jones Dining Hall, Helen DeVos College of Education, Center for the Humanities, School of Religion, Science and Math Complex, Communications Building, School of Nursing, and chapel. The Paul Conn Student Union built in 2000 was named in his honor. The campus received more than $200 million in improvements during his tenure and more than 12 new sports were offered at the scholarship level. The school's endowment increased from $2 million to more than $20 million during Conn's time in office.

Conn retired in 2020 after serving 34 years as Lee's president. When his successor, Dr. Mark Walker, resigned in 2024, Conn returned to lead the school again for the 2024-2025 school year. Conn's son, Brian, became Lee's director of communications. Conn's daughter, Vanessa Hammond, became Lee's vice president of university relations.

== Writing career ==
Conn has authored or co-authored 20 books. Three were adapted for TV and four were listed on the New York Times Best Seller list.

- Battle for Africa, by Brother Andrew with Charles Paul Conn
- Believe, by Richard M. DeVos with Charles Paul Conn
- Dad, Mom, and the Church, by Charles Paul Conn
- Disguised, by Patricia Moore with Charles Paul Conn
- Eckerd: Finding the Right Prescription, by Jack Eckerd and Charles Paul Conn
- Father Care, by Charles Paul Conn
- Hooked on a Good Thing, by Sammy Hall with Charles Paul Conn
- Julian Carroll of Kentucky, by Charles Paul Conn
- Just Off Chicken Street, by Floyd McClung, Jr. with Charles Paul Conn
- Kathy, by Barbara Miller and Charles Paul Conn
- The Magnificent Three, by Nicky Cruz with Charles Paul Conn
- Making it Happen, by Charles Paul Conn
- Music Makers: A Profile of the Lee Singers, by Charles Paul Conn
- The New Johnny Cash, by Charles Paul Conn
- No Easy Game, by Terry Bradshaw with Charles Paul Conn
- The Possible Dream: A Candid Look at Amway, by Charles Paul Conn
- The Power of Positive Students, by Dr. William Mitchell with Dr. Charles Paul Conn
- Promises to Keep: The Amway Phenomenon and How it Works, by Charles Paul Conn
- An Uncommon Freedom, by Charles Paul Conn
- The Winner’s Circle, by Charles Paul Conn
