= Fairview, Bradley County, Tennessee =

Unincorporated community in Tennessee, United States

Coordinates: 35°13′18″N 84°49′30″W

Fairview is a former unincorporated community located in Bradley County, Tennessee, United States. It was annexed into the city of Cleveland beginning in the late 1980s. It appears on numerous maps produced by the U.S. Geological Survey, and is part of the Cleveland, Tennessee, metropolitan area.

== Geography ==
Fairview is located about 5 miles (8.0 km) north northeast of the business district of Cleveland. It is centered on U.S. Route 11 at an intersection with Tasso Road. Less than two miles east of the community is the unincorporated community of Tasso. The elevation of Fairview is approximately 830 feet (250 m) above mean sea level.

== History ==
Fairview began around 1887 when a number of local investors began purchasing land and constructing homes at the location. Most of the area in and around the community was part of Hardwick Farms, which belonged to the prominent Hardwick family, who were the founders of Hardwick Clothes and Hardwick Stove Company, two prominent businesses founded and headquartered in Cleveland. In 1955 Hardwick Field, also known as Cleveland Municipal Airport, was constructed in the western part of the community, which operated until December 31, 2013, when it was replaced by Cleveland Regional Jetport. The Church of God of Prophecy, based in Cleveland, operated Tomlinson College in the community from 1966 to 1992. The facilities are now used by Tennessee Christian Preparatory School (TCPS).

Beginning in the 1960s, large-scale residential growth began taking place in and around the community, which has continued into the present. Beginning in 1988, the city of Cleveland began annexing parts of the community and surrounding areas into the city limits, which continued until the mid-1990s. Today the community effectively exists as a neighborhood of Cleveland, with the boundaries of the city limits on the eastern edge of the community and extending north of the community for about 1 mile (1.6 km). Much of the Hardwick farmland still exists southeast of the community, listed on the National Register of Historic Places (NRHP) in 2019.
