= Burlington Heights =

Burlington Heights may refer to:

- Burlington Heights, New Jersey, United States.
- Burlington Heights (Ontario), Canada.
- Burlington Heights, Cleveland, United States.
