= Centenary Avenue Historic District =

- Centenary Historic District
- U.S. National Register of Historic Places
- U.S. Historic district
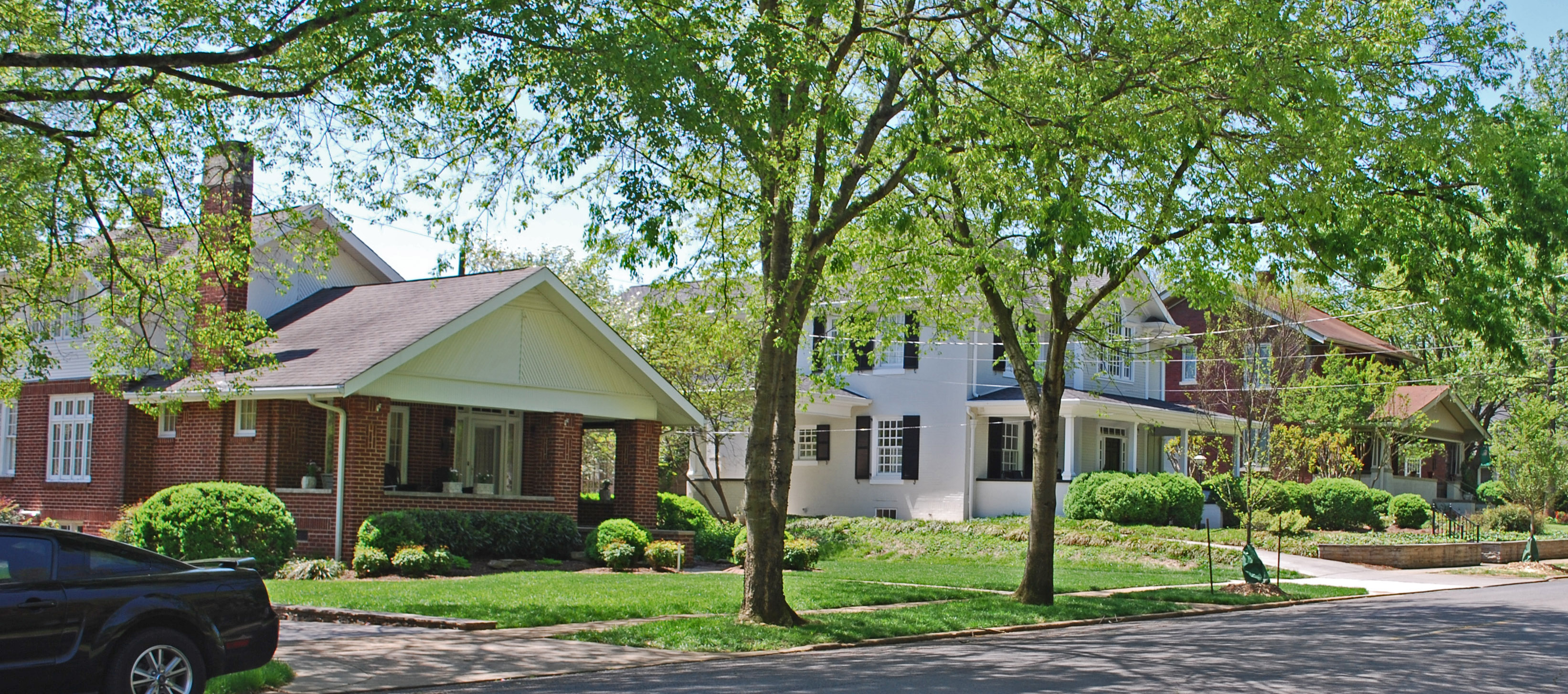
- Centenary Avenue is a historic districts in Cleveland, Tennessee. The private residences are built in Tudor Revival, Bungalow/Craftsman and Colonial Revival architectural styles.

- Location within Tennessee Location within the United States
- Location: Bounded by Eighteenth, Harle, Thirteenth and Ocoee Streets., Cleveland, Tennessee
- Coordinates: 35°10′03″N 84°52′29″W
- Area: 1 acre (0.40 ha)
- Architect: Multiple
- Architectural style: Tudor Revival, Bungalow / Craftsman, Colonial Revival, Queen Anne
- NRHP reference No.: 93000172
- Added to NRHP: April 1, 1993

The Centenary Avenue is one of the oldest historic districts in Cleveland, Tennessee. It is bounded by Eighteenth, Harle, Thirteenth and Ocoee Streets, is located adjacent to the Ocoee Street Historic District, and is regarded as one of the widest streets in Cleveland. The homes there were built from 1850 to 1949.

Added to the city's historic registry in 1993, the private residences on Centenary Avenue are built in Tudor Revival, Bungalow/Craftsman and Colonial Revival architectural styles.

== Home of Tall Betsy ==
The Centenary district received national attention from 1980 to 1998 when a house owned by businessman Allan Jones located at 150 Centenary Avenue NW became the site of Halloween appearances by the famous Tall Betsy goblin that stands more than 7 feet, 6 inches tall.

Centenary Avenue is mentioned in a famous poem about Tall Betsy and in a state resolution adopted on May 24, 1989, honoring Tall Betsy as the “official Halloween Goblin of Bradley County.” The historic district was also featured in a 2011 documentary about Tall Betsy that aired on PBS and NBC and won a prestigious Telly Award in 2013. It was narrated by Lynn Hoffman, host of A&E’s popular “Private Sessions.”

The residential areas within the district achieved their maturity before 1900, though Sycamore has grown considerably from the 3,330 or so that lived there from about 1900 until the 1970s most of the historic district remains intact as it was organized in 1978.

Tall Betsy was started in 1980 by Jones, who at the time was a single parent raising his daughter Courtney and living at the Centenary residence. Jones had heard his mother, Gincy Slaughter Jones, tell stories of Tall Betsy as he was a child growing up at 480 21st Street NW in Cleveland, TN.

According to Jones, who later became known as “Mr. Halloween,” the real Tall Betsy was a very tall woman who walked the streets of Cleveland, TN in the early 1920s. She always wore black and was referred to by the townspeople as Tall Betsy, Black Betsy, and the Lady in Black.

Tall Betsy first appeared in Cleveland's Johnston Park downtown for an afternoon event on Halloween day, 1980. Jones' mother was hosting a party for Courtney at the Centenary Avenue home before the kids went out trick-or-treating. Jones left Johnston Park and got a friend in a pickup truck to allow him to lay in the back and deliver him to the party at 150 Centenary Avenue. Jones appeared in the backyard and scared the kids, who were the first to see Tall Betsy. As they left to go down the street trick-or-treating, Tall Betsy walked in front of the Jones house and stood waiting for young trick-or-treaters.

As Tall Betsy became popular across Tennessee and eventually nationwide, thousands came to Jones' door each year and thousands more simply drove by the Centenary home.

The goblin became so popular that in 1986, Jones organized the downtown Halloween Block Party that included games, costume contests and treats. The event was intended to draw the crowds off of Centenary Avenue after 8 p.m.

In 1993 the Jones house kept count and set a world record of 11,201 pieces of bubble gum given away one at a time to young kids coming to the Centenary Avenue home from 5 to 8p.m.

After drawing a crowd of 25,000 in 1998, Jones retired Tall Betsy and moved away from Centenary Avenue. The goblin was said to have vanished forever to a mausoleum at Cleveland's Fort Hill Cemetery.

== Appearance of New Tall Betsy on Centenary in 2016 ==
On Oct. 31, 2016 a new version of the Tall Betsy goblin appeared at the famous address for the first time in 18 years. The appearance drew national attention. The new Tall Betsy was created by Jones’ son, Bailey and had an updated look.

“Tall Betsy has fans worldwide, but Cleveland is where the legend started and we wanted to do something to honor this city and the generations who witnessed the original goblin,” Allan Jones told the Cleveland Daily Banner. “The new Tall Betsy looks and feels like a real person. We took the goblin to the next level of spookiness.”

The new look for Tall Betsy was created by Hollywood Mask Masters in Van Nuys, Calif., using real human hair. The face and hands were intended for a big-budget Hollywood film that never finished completion.
