= Cleveland, Tennessee =

- City
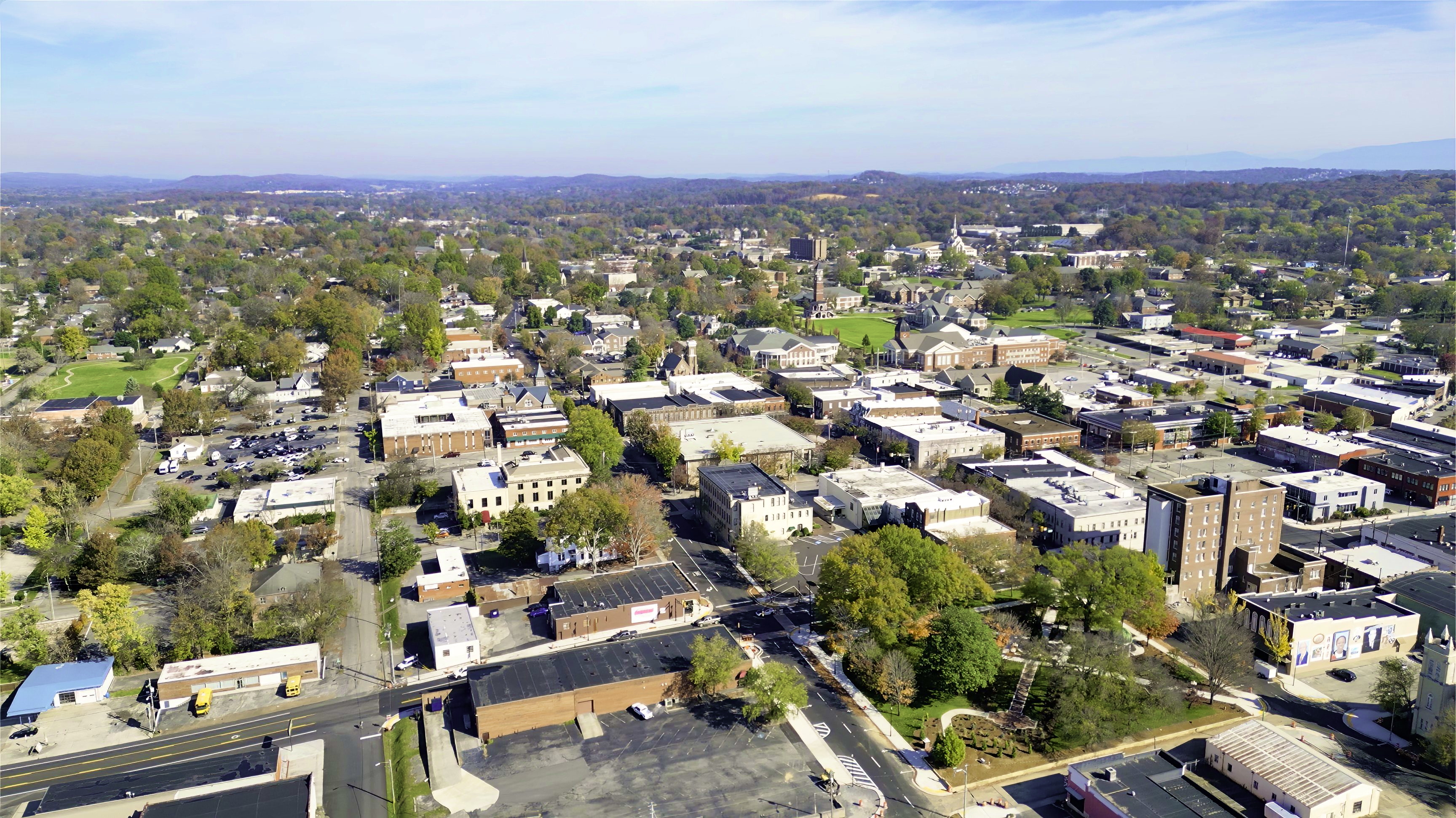
- Downtown Cleveland from the air

- Flag Seal Logo
- Nickname: The City with Spirit
- Location of Cleveland in Bradley County, Tennessee.

- Location within Tennessee Location within the United States
- Coordinates: 35°10′17″N 84°52′16″W
- Country: United States
- State: Tennessee
- County: Bradley
- Founded: 1835
- Incorporated: 1842
- Named for: Benjamin Cleveland

Government
  - Type: City Council
  - Mayor: Kevin Brooks
  - City Manager: Joe Fivas

Area
  - Total: 30.87 sq mi (79.96 km^{2})
  - Land: 30.87 sq mi (79.94 km^{2})
  - Water: 0.0077 sq mi (0.02 km^{2})
- Elevation: 860 ft (260 m)

Population (2020)
  - Total: 47,356
  - Estimate (2025): 51,172 ▲
  - Density: 1,534.3/sq mi (592.41/km^{2})
- Time zone: UTC−5 (Eastern (EST))
  - Summer (DST): UTC−4 (EDT)
- ZIP Codes: 37311–37312, 37320, 37323, 37364
- Area codes: 423 and 729
- FIPS code: 47-15400
- GNIS feature ID: 1280705
- Website: www.clevelandtn.gov

Cleveland is the county seat of and the largest city in Bradley County, Tennessee. The population was 47,356 at the 2020 census. It is the principal city of the Cleveland metropolitan area, Tennessee (consisting of Bradley and neighboring Polk County), which is included in the Chattanooga–Cleveland–Dalton, TN–GA–AL Combined Statistical Area.

Cleveland is the seventeenth-largest city in Tennessee and has the fifth-largest industrial economy, having thirteen Fortune 500 manufacturers.

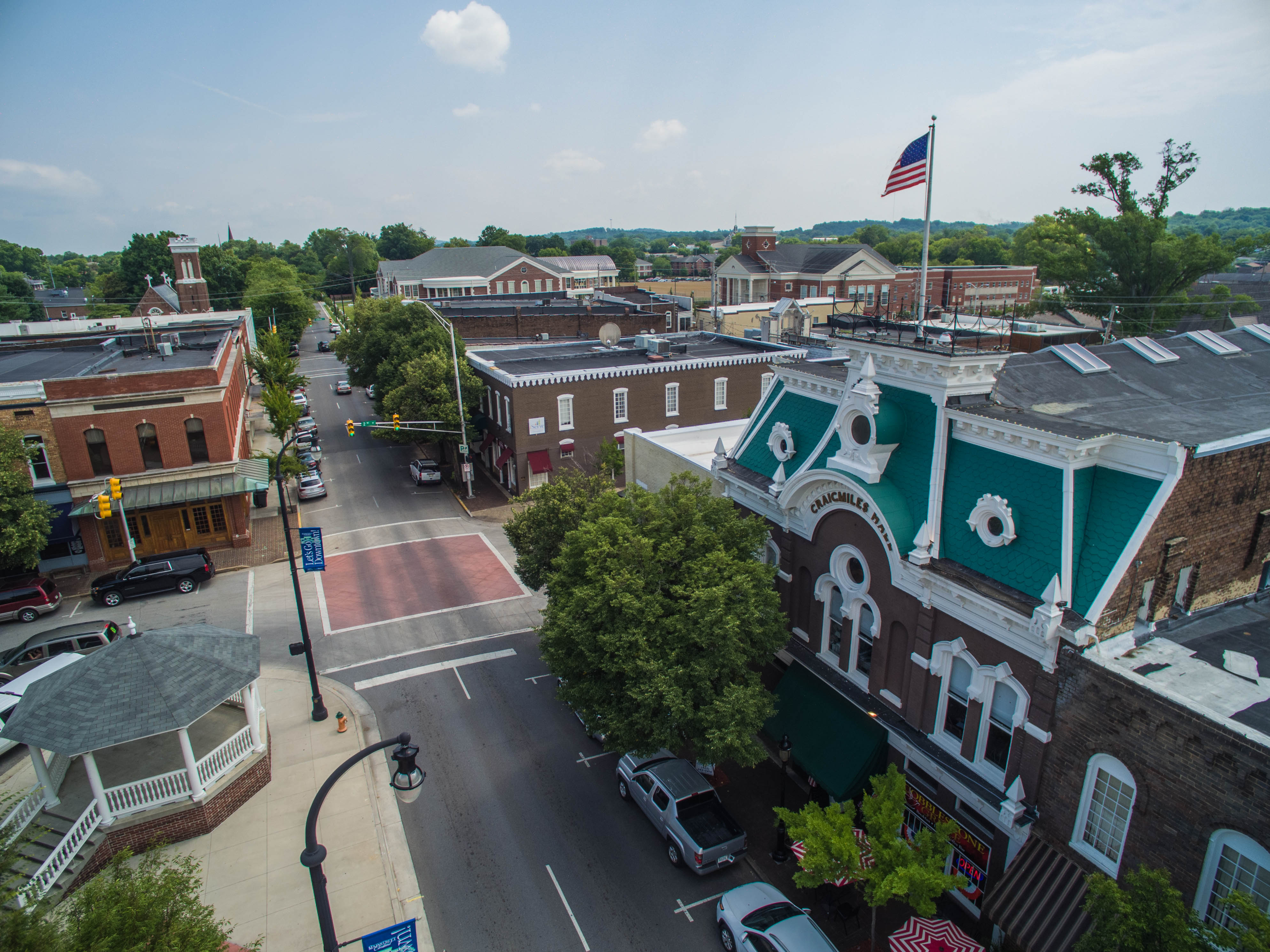
Craigmiles Hall (on the right) in downtown Cleveland

== History ==
=== Early history ===
For thousands of years before European encounter, this area was occupied by succeeding cultures of indigenous peoples. Peoples of the South Appalachian Mississippian culture, beginning about 900–1000 CE, established numerous villages along the river valleys and tributaries. In the more influential villages, they built a single, large earthen platform mound, sometimes surmounted by a temple or elite residence, which was an expression of their religious and political system.

This area was later part of a large territory occupied by the Cherokee Nation, an Iroquoian-speaking people believed to have migrated south from the Great Lakes area, where other Iroquoian tribes arose. Their public architecture was known as the townhouse, a large structure designed for the community to gather together. In some cases, these were built on top of existing mounds; in others the townhouse would front on a broad plaza. Their territory encompassed areas of Western North Carolina, western South Carolina, southeastern Tennessee, northeastern Georgia, and northern Alabama.

The first Europeans to reach the area now occupied by Cleveland and Bradley County were most likely a 1540 expedition through the interior led by Spanish explorer Hernando de Soto. Based on their chronicles, they are believed to have camped along Candies Creek in the western part of present-day Cleveland on June 2, 1540. They encountered some chiefdoms of the Mississippian culture in other areas of South and North Carolina, Tennessee and Georgia. Some writers have suggested that the de Soto expedition was preceded by a party of Welshmen, but there is no supporting evidence and historians consider this unlikely.

During and after the American Revolutionary War, more European Americans entered this area seeking land. They came into increasing conflict with the Cherokee, who occupied this territory. The Cherokee had tolerated traders but resisted settlers who tried to take over their territory and competed for resources.

Because of being defeated in repeated attacks by Americans, in 1819 the Cherokee ceded the land directly north of present-day Bradley County (and north of the Hiwassee River) to the U.S. government in the Calhoun Treaty. In 1821 the Cherokee Agency—the official liaison between the U.S. government and the Cherokee Nation—was moved to the south bank of the Hiwassee River in present-day Charleston, a few miles north of what is now Cleveland. The Indian agent was Colonel Return J. Meigs.

By the 1830s, white settlers had begun to move rapidly into this area in anticipation of a forced relocation of the Cherokee and other Southeast tribes. Congress had passed the Indian Removal Act in 1830, under President Andrew Jackson's direction. In 1832, the Cherokee moved the seat of their government to the Red Clay Council Grounds in southern Bradley County. Some Cherokee had already moved to the West, where they were known as Old Settlers until reunification of the Nation. It operated there until the Cherokee removal in 1838, part of the larger forced migration of Cherokee to Indian Territory (present-day Oklahoma). This became known as the Trail of Tears. The former Cherokee seat is now preserved within Red Clay State Park.

The removal was initiated by the Treaty of New Echota on December 29, 1835, although the majority of Cherokee leaders had not approved it. In the Spring of 1838, removal operations by the US military began. Headquarters for the removal were established at Fort Cass in Charleston. In preparation, thousands of Cherokees were rounded up and held in internment camps located between Cleveland and Charleston. Two of the largest were at Rattlesnake Springs. Blythe Ferry, about 15 miles (24 km) northwest of Cleveland in Meigs County, was also an important site during the Cherokee removal.

The legislative act on February 10, 1836, that created Bradley County, which was named for Colonel Edward Bradley of Shelby County, Tennessee, authorized the establishment of a county seat. It was to be named "Cleveland" after Colonel Benjamin Cleveland, a commander at the Battle of Kings Mountain during the American Revolution. The legislative body appointed to govern the county was required to meet in nearby Chatata Valley until a site was chosen for the county seat.

By a one-vote majority on May 2, 1836, the commissioners chose "Taylor's Place," the home of Andrew Taylor, as the county seat, due largely to the site's excellent water sources. Taylor, who had married a Cherokee woman and constructed a log cabin on the site next to a spring, had been given a reservation at the site. A permanent settlement had been established there in 1835, and became a favored stopping place for travelers. The other proposed location for the city was a site a few miles to the east, owned by a wealthy Cherokee named Deer-In-The-Water.

Cleveland was formally established as the county seat by the state legislature on January 20, 1838. That year the city was reported to have a population of 400; it was home to two churches (one Presbyterian, the other Methodist), and a private school for boys, the Oak Grove Academy. The city was incorporated on February 4, 1842, and elections for mayor and aldermen were held shortly afterward on April 4 that year.

While the overwhelming majority of early inhabitants of Cleveland earned their living in agriculture, by 1850 the city also had a sizeable number of skilled craftsmen and professional people. On September 5, 1851, the railroad was completed through Cleveland. After copper mining began in the Copper Basin in neighboring Polk County in the 1840s, headquarters for mining operations were established in Cleveland by Julius Eckhardt Raht, a German-born businessman and engineer. Copper was delivered from the basin to Cleveland by wagon, where it was loaded onto trains. The city's first bank, the Ocoee Bank, was established in 1854.

=== Civil War ===
While bitterly divided over the issue of secession on the eve of the Civil War, Cleveland, like Bradley County and most of East Tennessee, voted against Tennessee's Ordinance of Secession in June 1861. The results of the countywide vote were 1,382 to 507 in favor of remaining in the Union. Bradley County was represented by Richard M. Edwards and J.G. Brown at the 1861 East Tennessee Convention in Greeneville, an unsuccessful attempt to allow East Tennessee to split from the state and remain part of the Union.

Cleveland and Bradley County were occupied by the Confederate Army from June 1861 until the fall of 1863. Despite this occupation, locals remained loyal to the Union, and placed a Union flag in the courthouse square in April 1861, where it remained until June 1862, when it was removed by Confederate forces from Mississippi. Confederate forces also seized control of the copper mines in the Ducktown basin and the rolling mill in Cleveland owned by Raht. Throughout the war both Union and Confederate troops would pass through Cleveland en route to other locations, which led to many brief skirmishes in the area. The most deadly event in Bradley County during the Civil War was a train wreck near the Black Fox community, a few miles south of Cleveland, that killed 270 Confederate soldiers.

Some significant Civil War locations in Bradley County include the Henegar House in Charleston, in which both Union and Confederate generals, including William Tecumseh Sherman, used as brief headquarters; the Charleston Cumberland Presbyterian Church, also in Charleston, which was used by Confederate forces as a hospital; and the Blue Springs Encampments and Fortifications in southern Bradley County, where Union troops under the command of General Sherman camped on numerous occasions between October 1863 and the end of the war. Troops under the command of Sherman also reportedly camped in 1863 near Tasso, a few miles northeast of Cleveland, on multiple occasions.

No large-scale battles took place in and around Cleveland, but the city was considered militarily important due to the railroads. On June 30, 1862, President Abraham Lincoln sent a telegram to General Henry W. Halleck, which read, "To take and hold the railroad at or east of Cleveland, Tennessee, I think is as fully as important as the taking and holding of Richmond." The railroad bridge over the Hiwassee River to the north was among those destroyed by the East Tennessee bridge-burning conspiracy in November 1861.

On November 25, 1863, during the Battle of Missionary Ridge in Chattanooga, a group of 1,500 Union cavalrymen led by Col. Eli Long arrived in Cleveland. Over the next two days they destroyed twelve miles of railroad in the area, burned the railroad bridge over the Hiwassee a second time, and destroyed the copper rolling mill, which Confederate forces had been using to manufacture artillery shells, percussion caps, and other weaponry. This would prove to be a major blow to the entire Confederate army, as approximately 90% of their copper came from the Ducktown mines. The next day Long's troops were attacked by a group of about 500 Confederate cavalrymen led by Col. John H. Kelly, and quickly retreated to Chattanooga.

The defeat of Confederate forces in Chattanooga resulted in Union troops regaining control of Cleveland and Bradley County by January 1864, and they retained control for the remainder of the war. Within a few days of the Battle of Missionary Ridge and Long's raid, several Union units, including members of the 9th Indiana Infantry Regiment, arrived in Cleveland. Additional Union troops arrived in the area in the summer of 1864, and between May and October 1864 a Union artillery unit was stationed downtown, with headquarters established at the home of Julius Eckhardt Raht. During this time as many as 20,000 Union troops at a time camped in the fields surrounding the house in preparation for Sherman's Atlanta campaign. Union troops also established two forts, Fort McPherson and Fort Sedgewick, located at Hillcrest Memorial Gardens and Fort Hill Cemetery, respectively, on the highest points of the ridge south of downtown. They successfully repelled an attempted raid by Confederate Gen. Joseph Wheeler on August 17, 1864.

Most of the Union troops stationed in Bradley County left in the summer of 1864 as part of the Atlanta campaign. From this point, Confederate sympathizers conducted guerrilla attacks against Unionist families in Cleveland and surrounding areas, continuing until after the war was over. Members of the Army of Tennessee attempted to destroy a passing Union train near Tasso in the spring of 1864, which instead resulted in the destruction of a Confederate train. The Civil War resulted in much damage to Cleveland and Bradley County, and much of the area was left in ruins.

=== Reconstruction and industrial revolution ===
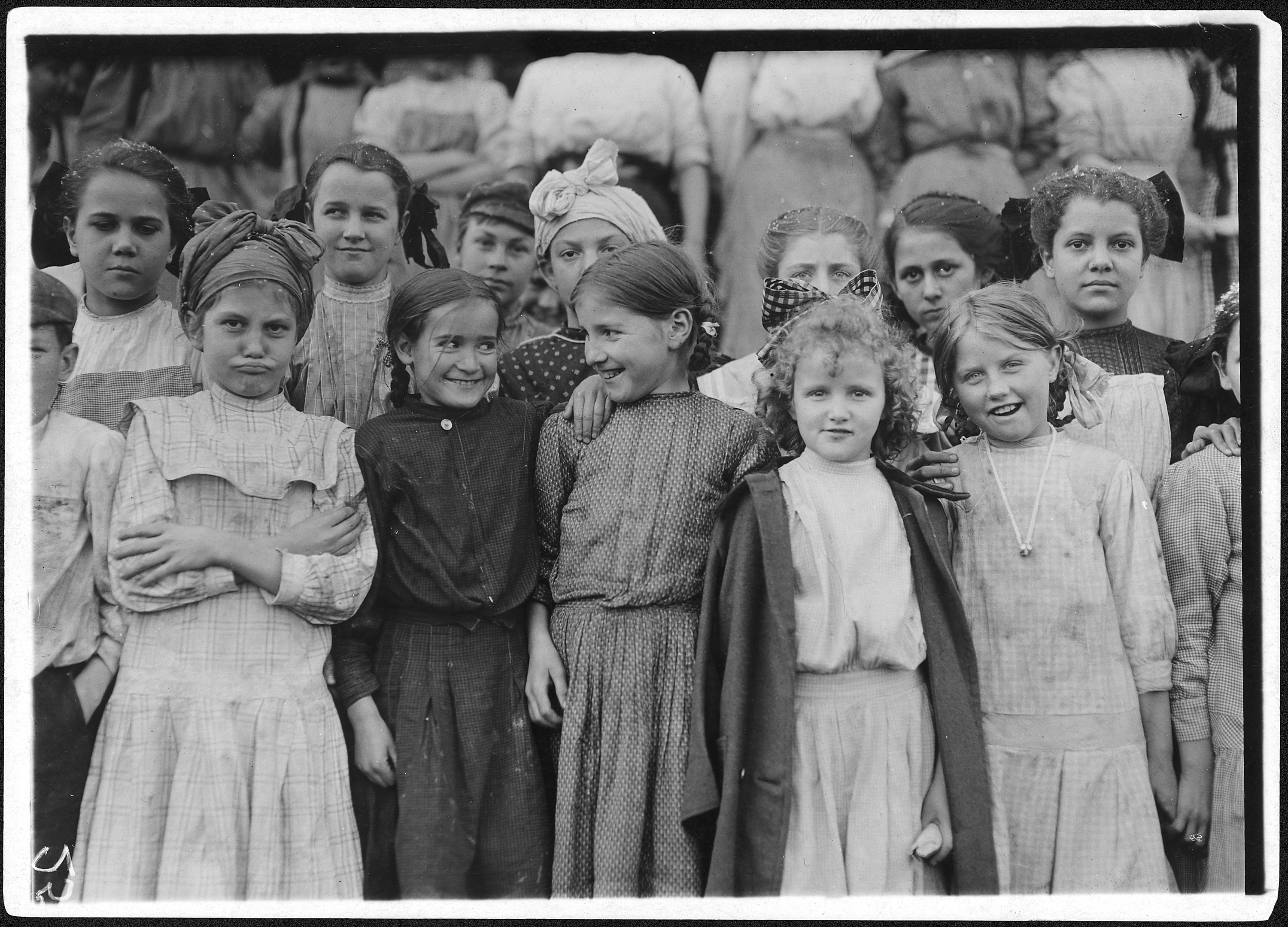
Child workers from Cleveland's Hosiery Mills, 1910. Photo by Lewis Hine.

Despite the devastation of the Civil War, Cleveland recovered quickly and much more rapidly than many cities in the South. During the 1870s, Cleveland had a growth spurt, and became one of the first cities in Tennessee to begin to develop industry. Raht, who had fled to Cincinnati, Ohio during the Civil War, returned to Cleveland in 1866 and reopened the copper mines. By 1878 it produced a total of 24 million pounds of copper. Numerous factories were also established, including the Hardwick Stove Company in 1879, the Cleveland Woolen Mills in 1880, and the Cleveland Chair Company in 1884.

By 1890, this industrialization helped the city support nine physicians, twelve attorneys, eleven general stores, fourteen grocery stores, three drug stores, three hardware stores, six butcher shops, two hatmakers, two hotels, a shoe store, and seven saloons.

Reflecting industrial prosperity, the city's iconic Craigmiles Hall was constructed in 1878 as an opera house and meeting hall. It is regarded as the city's most famous landmark and is one of Tennessee's most photographed buildings. Behind Craigmiles Hall is a reconstructed bandstand, first built in 1920. The reconstruction was built in 2005 by the Allan Jones Foundation, based on the 1920 blueprints.

The city failed to renew its charter in 1879, with the result that it disincorporated on January 1, 1880. Residents worked to reincorporate the city, and on March 15, 1882, they voted overwhelmingly in favor of recharter. The first city elections under the new charter took place on May 20, 1882. Public amenities were developed in the late 19th century: A mule-drawn trolley system was founded in 1886, and the city received telephone service in 1888. In 1895 the city received electricity and public water. During this period, Cleveland's population more than doubled, from 1,812 in 1880 to 3,643 in 1900. Many of the buildings in today's downtown area, now designated as the Cleveland Commercial Historic District, as well as those in the nearby Ocoee Street and Centenary Avenue historic districts, were constructed between 1880 and 1915.

=== 20th century ===
In 1911 the local chapter of the United Daughters of the Confederacy erected a monument at the intersection of Ocoee, Broad, and 8th streets. This monument was reportedly the first of its kind in East Tennessee. In 1914, the Grand Army of the Republic placed a monument in honor of Union soldiers from Bradley County in Fort Hill Cemetery.

In 1918, the Church of God, a Christian denomination headquartered in Cleveland, established a Bible school that would develop as Lee University. Cleveland's Chamber of Commerce was established in 1925. On March 21, 1931, the city's form of government was changed from mayor-aldermen to city commission.

Bob Jones College, a non-denominational Christian college, relocated to Cleveland in 1933 from Panama City, Florida, where it remained until 1947, when it moved to Greenville, South Carolina. The Reverend Billy Graham attended Bob Jones College in Cleveland for one year beginning in 1936. Lee College, later Lee University, came to occupy that campus in downtown Cleveland after Bob Jones College's departure.

Following World War II, several major industries located to the area, and the city entered a period of rapid industrial and economic growth as part of the Post–World War II economic expansion. Major factories constructed in the city during this time included American Uniform Company in 1949, Peerless Woolen Mills in 1955, Mallory Battery in 1961, Olin Corporation near Charleston in 1962, and Bendix Corporation in 1964, as well as a Bowater paper mill in nearby Calhoun in 1954. Despite this massive growth in employment, many African American residents of Cleveland and Bradley County moved away as part of the Second Great Migration, and the number of blacks in Cleveland actually declined between 1940 and 1970, while the city's overall population nearly doubled during this time. During this time and afterwards, Cleveland became one of the largest manufacturing hubs in the Southeastern United States, and this economic expansion continued into the 21st century, with additional major factories locating to the area in the 1970s and 1980s.

In 1966 the Church of God of Prophecy, based in Cleveland, established Tomlinson College north of town, which remained in operation until 1992, when it closed. That same year Cleveland High School was established and schools in Cleveland and Bradley County were integrated. Cleveland State Community College was established in 1967.

In the 1970s and 1980s, the city gained a national reputation for the crime of odometer fraud after 40 people in Bradley County, including multiple owners of car dealerships, were sent to federal prison for the crime. Cleveland was the subject of a November 1983 60 Minutes episode about this crime. The city came to be known as the "Odometer Rollback Capital of the World" to some.

Beginning in the 1950s, the city began to gradually expand to the north as a result of most residential and industrial growth taking place there, but prior to 1987, the city limits of Cleveland did not extend west of Candies Creek Ridge.

In 1988, the city began annexing large numbers of adjacent neighborhoods and industrial areas north, northeast, and northwest of the city. These major annexations continued until the late 1990s, and led to the city's land area increasing in size from approximately 18 square miles in 1989 to about 29.5 square miles in 2000. As a result of this growth, the downtown business district is now geographically located in the southern part of the city.

=== Recent history ===
In 1993, Cleveland voters approved a referendum changing the city's form of government from a city commission to a council-manager government.

Cleveland officially adopted the nickname "The City with Spirit" in 2012. In 2018 voters approved a referendum allowing for package liquor stores to be located within the city. In 2020, the city completed construction of a public park at the site of Taylor Spring, where the first settlement that became Cleveland was founded.

== Geography ==
Cleveland is located in southeast Tennessee in the center of Bradley County in the Great Appalachian Valley, situated among a series of low hills and ridges roughly 15 miles (24 km) west of the Blue Ridge Mountains and 15 miles (24 km) east of the Chickamauga Lake impoundment of the Tennessee River. The Hiwassee River, which flows down out of the mountains and forms the northern boundary of Bradley County, empties into the Tennessee a few miles northwest of Cleveland. According to the United States Census Bureau, the city had a total land area of 26.9 square miles (69.7 km^{2}) in 2010.

The area's terrain is made up of parallel ridges, including Candies Creek Ridge (also called Clingan Ridge), Mouse Creek/Lead Mine Ridge, and Blue Springs Ridge, which are extensions of the Appalachian Mountains (specifically part of the Ridge-and-Valley Appalachians) that run approximately north-northeast through the area. Mouse Creek and Blue Springs Ridge have significantly lower elevations within the city of Cleveland than elsewhere in Bradley County, which historically made the area easier to settle. Several streams run in the valleys between the ridges including Candies Creek, located west of Clingan Ridge, and South Mouse Creek, between Mouse Creek and Lead Mine Ridge. Elevations in the city range from just under 700 feet (210 m) to nearly 1,200 feet (370 m). The Tennessee Valley Divide, the boundary of the Tennessee Valley and Mobile River drainage basins, is located on the southern and eastern fringes of the city, and has prevented the city limits from expanding beyond this point in most locations.

Downtown Cleveland, which roughly coexists with the Cleveland Commercial Historic District, encompasses the business district and consists of private businesses and government office buildings including the Bradley County Courthouse and Courthouse Annex, Cleveland Municipal Building, Cleveland Police and Fire department headquarters, and various other government buildings, primarily the offices of city and county departments. The surrounding residential areas, including the Stuart Heights, Ocoee Street, Centenary Avenue, and Annadale neighborhoods, are sometimes considered part of downtown Cleveland.

Northern Cleveland has developed as the location for most of the city's retail shops and private interests. In addition, it is a major residential division, made up of Burlington Heights, Fairview, and Sequoia Grove neighborhoods, and a few major industries. A large industrial area is also located in the northeastern part of the city. The western part of the city is almost entirely residential. Much of it is an extension of the city limits westward to encompass populous middle to upper-class neighborhoods including Hopewell Estates and Rolling Hills.

=== Neighborhoods ===
Several neighborhoods and communities are located within the city. These include:

- Annadale
- Burlington Heights
- North Cleveland
- Windwood
- Fairview
- Sequoia Grove
- Hopewell (partial)
- Centenary Avenue
- Ocoee Street
- Brentwood Estates
- 20th Street NE/Parker Street District
- Blythe Oldfield
- Blueberry Hill
- Rolling Hills
- Laurel Ridge

=== Climate ===
Since 1908, 28 tornadoes have been documented in the Cleveland area, seven of which struck on April 27, 2011. The deadliest was an EF4 tornado that killed over twenty people southwest of Cleveland.

Climate data for Cleveland, Tennessee (1991–2020 normals, extremes 1955–present)
Month	Jan	Feb	Mar	Apr	May	Jun	Jul	Aug	Sep	Oct	Nov	Dec	Year
Record high °F (°C)	76 (24)	80 (27)	86 (30)	91 (33)	95 (35)	105 (41)	105 (41)	104 (40)	100 (38)	97 (36)	86 (30)	76 (24)	105 (41)
Mean maximum °F (°C)	67.8 (19.9)	71.7 (22.1)	78.7 (25.9)	84.2 (29.0)	88.4 (31.3)	92.9 (33.8)	94.9 (34.9)	94.4 (34.7)	91.8 (33.2)	84.4 (29.1)	75.8 (24.3)	68.3 (20.2)	96.0 (35.6)
Mean daily maximum °F (°C)	50.0 (10.0)	54.6 (12.6)	62.7 (17.1)	72.4 (22.4)	79.5 (26.4)	86.1 (30.1)	89.0 (31.7)	88.4 (31.3)	83.0 (28.3)	73.0 (22.8)	61.3 (16.3)	52.6 (11.4)	71.0 (21.7)
Daily mean °F (°C)	39.7 (4.3)	43.6 (6.4)	50.8 (10.4)	59.5 (15.3)	67.5 (19.7)	75.1 (23.9)	78.4 (25.8)	77.6 (25.3)	71.6 (22.0)	60.3 (15.7)	49.0 (9.4)	42.4 (5.8)	59.6 (15.3)
Mean daily minimum °F (°C)	29.4 (−1.4)	32.6 (0.3)	38.8 (3.8)	46.7 (8.2)	55.6 (13.1)	64.0 (17.8)	67.8 (19.9)	66.8 (19.3)	60.1 (15.6)	47.6 (8.7)	36.7 (2.6)	32.2 (0.1)	48.2 (9.0)
Mean minimum °F (°C)	11.0 (−11.7)	15.2 (−9.3)	20.8 (−6.2)	29.5 (−1.4)	39.6 (4.2)	52.6 (11.4)	59.0 (15.0)	57.6 (14.2)	45.0 (7.2)	30.8 (−0.7)	21.2 (−6.0)	16.6 (−8.6)	8.4 (−13.1)
Record low °F (°C)	−16 (−27)	−2 (−19)	0 (−18)	20 (−7)	30 (−1)	37 (3)	49 (9)	47 (8)	30 (−1)	21 (−6)	9 (−13)	−4 (−20)	−16 (−27)
Average precipitation inches (mm)	5.20 (132)	4.88 (124)	5.56 (141)	5.01 (127)	4.58 (116)	4.90 (124)	5.14 (131)	3.84 (98)	4.67 (119)	3.52 (89)	4.85 (123)	5.47 (139)	57.62 (1,464)
Average snowfall inches (cm)	0.2 (0.51)	0.6 (1.5)	0.0 (0.0)	0.0 (0.0)	0.0 (0.0)	0.0 (0.0)	0.0 (0.0)	0.0 (0.0)	0.0 (0.0)	0.0 (0.0)	0.0 (0.0)	0.3 (0.76)	1.1 (2.8)
Average precipitation days (≥ 0.01 in)	12.7	12.7	13.6	11.6	12.0	12.7	12.7	10.2	8.6	9.2	10.3	13.9	140.2
Average snowy days (≥ 0.1 in)	0.3	0.4	0.0	0.0	0.0	0.0	0.0	0.0	0.0	0.0	0.0	0.2	0.9
Source: NOAA

== Demographics ==
Historical population
Census	Pop.	Note	%±
1860	806		—
1870	1,658		105.7%
1880	1,874		13.0%
1890	2,863		52.8%
1900	3,858		34.8%
1910	5,549		43.8%
1920	6,522		17.5%
1930	9,136		40.1%
1940	11,351		24.2%
1950	12,605		11.0%
1960	16,196		28.5%
1970	21,446		32.4%
1980	26,415		23.2%
1990	30,354		14.9%
2000	37,192		22.5%
2010	41,285		11.0%
2020	47,356		14.7%
2025 (est.)	51,172	▲	8.1%
U.S. Decennial Census

Cleveland is the principal city of the Cleveland Metropolitan Statistical Area, a metropolitan area that covers Bradley and Polk counties and had a combined population of 115,788 at the 2010 census.

=== Racial and ethnic composition ===
Cleveland city, Tennessee – Racial and Ethnic Composition (NH = Non-Hispanic) Note: the US Census treats Hispanic/Latino as an ethnic category. This table excludes Latinos from the racial categories and assigns them to a separate category. Hispanics/Latinos may be of any race.
Race / Ethnicity	Pop 2010	Pop 2020	% 2010	% 2020
White alone (NH)	33,612	34,214	81.41%	72.25%
Black or African American alone (NH)	2,975	3,779	7.21%	7.98%
Native American or Alaska Native alone (NH)	107	130	0.26%	0.27%
Asian alone (NH)	618	825	1.50%	1.74%
Pacific Islander alone (NH)	31	85	0.08%	0.18%
Some Other Race alone (NH)	57	185	0.14%	0.39%
Mixed Race/Multi-Racial (NH)	779	2,830	1.89%	5.34%
Hispanic or Latino (any race)	3,106	5,608	7.52%	11.84%
Total	41,285	47,356	100.00%	100.00%

=== 2020 census ===
As of the 2020 census, Cleveland had a population of 47,356 and 10,005 families. The median age was 35.9 years; 21.7% of residents were under the age of 18 and 16.9% of residents were 65 years of age or older. For every 100 females there were 89.0 males, and for every 100 females age 18 and over, there were 85.3 males age 18 and over.

99.6% of residents lived in urban areas, while 0.4% lived in rural areas.

There were 18,559 households in Cleveland, of which 29.6% had children under the age of 18 living in them. Of all households, 40.7% were married-couple households, 18.8% were households with a male householder and no spouse or partner present, and 33.6% were households with a female householder and no spouse or partner present. About 31.0% of all households were made up of individuals and 12.8% had someone living alone who was 65 years of age or older.

There were 19,941 housing units, of which 6.9% were vacant. The homeowner vacancy rate was 1.8% and the rental vacancy rate was 6.2%.

=== 2010 census ===
As of the census of 2010, there was a population of 41,285, with 16,107 households and 10,063 families residing in the city. The population density was 1,535.3 inhabitants per square mile (592.8/km^{2}). There were 17,841 housing units at an average density of 663.5 units per square mile (256.2 units/km^{2}). The racial makeup of the city was 87.10% White, 7.39% African American, 0.40% Native American, 1.53% Asian, 0.09% Pacific Islander, and 1.69% from two or more races. Hispanic or Latino of any race were 7.52% of the population.

There were 16,107 households, out of which 27.1% had children under the age of 18 living with them, 43.0% were married couples living together, 14.3% had a female householder with no husband present, and 37.5% were non-families. 30.0% of all households were made up of individuals, and 26.8% had someone living alone who was 65 years of age or older. The average household size was 2.40 and the average family size was 2.97.

In the city, the population was spread out, with 21.83% under the age of 18, 63.35% ages 18 to 64, and 14.83% over the age of 65. The gender makeup was 52.4% female and 47.6% male. The median female age was 36.5 and the median male age was 32.9

The median income for a household in the city was $36,270, and the median income for a family was $47,104. The per capita income for the city was $21,576. About 15.0% of families and 21.1% of the population were below the poverty line, including 25.5% of those under age 18 and 10.3% of those age 65 or over.

=== 2000 census ===
As of the census of 2000, there was a population of 37,192, with 15,037 households and 9,518 families residing in the city. The population density was 1,490.9 inhabitants per square mile (575.6/km^{2}). There were 16,431 housing units at an average density of 658.7 units per square mile (254.3 units/km^{2}). The racial makeup of the city was 89.00% White, 7.01% African American, 0.23% Native American, 0.97% Asian, 0.03% Pacific Islander, 1.29% from other races, and 1.46% from two or more races. Hispanic or Latino of any race were 2.87% of the population.

There were 15,037 households, out of which 28.4% had children under the age of 18 living with them, 46.6% were married couples living together, 13.0% had a female householder with no husband present, and 36.7% were non-families. 30.4% of all households were made up of individuals, and 10.8% had someone living alone who was 65 years of age or older. The average household size was 2.33 and the average family size was 2.90.

In the city, the population was spread out, with 21.9% under the age of 18, 15.4% from 18 to 24, 27.6% from 25 to 44, 21.2% from 45 to 64, and 13.9% who were 65 years of age or older. The median age was 34 years. For every 100 females, there were 89.5 males. For every 100 females age 18 and over, there were 85.0 males.

The median income for a household in the city was $30,098, and the median income for a family was $40,150. Males had a median income of $30,763 versus $21,480 for females. The per capita income for the city was $18,316. About 11.3% of families and 16.1% of the population were below the poverty line, including 19.5% of those under age 18 and 14.3% of those age 65 or over.

== Economy ==
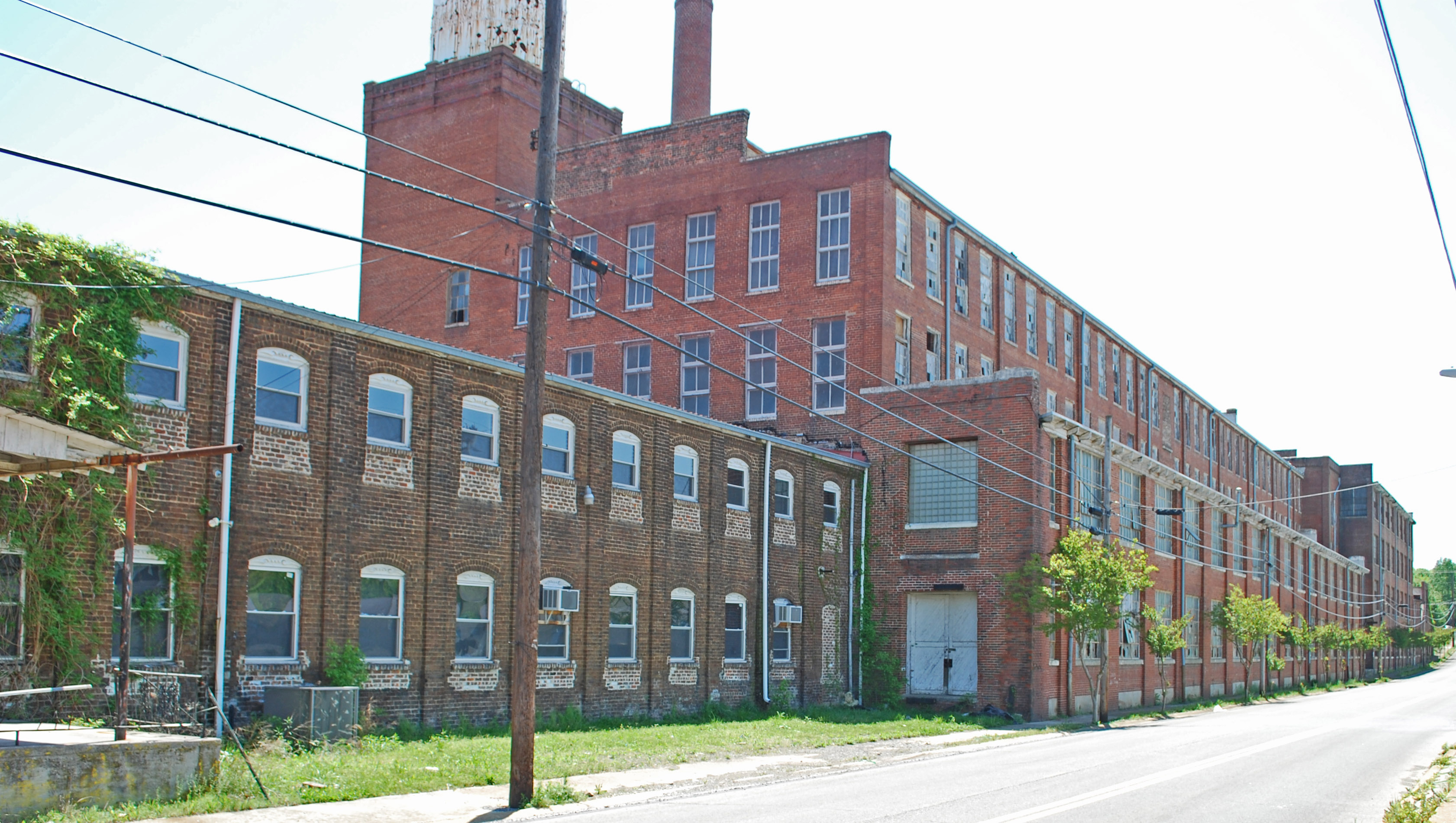
Old Hardwick Woolen Mills factory building in Cleveland, Tennessee

Cleveland is considered to be one of the largest industrial and manufacturing hubs in the state of Tennessee, with the number of manufacturers reportedly ranking fifth highest in the state. Goods produced include household cooking equipment, foodstuff, textiles, furniture, storage batteries, pharmaceuticals, industrial cleaning products, photographic processing, industrial and domestic chemicals, and automotive parts. Top employers include Whirlpool, Johnston Coca-Cola, Mars, Inc., Procter & Gamble, Duracell, Peyton's Southeastern, Arch Chemicals, Advanced Photographic Solutions, Renfro Foods, Flowers Bakery, Olin Corporation, Georgia Pacific, Rubbermaid, Exel, Inc., Jackson Furniture, Cleveland Chair Company, Eaton Corporation, Formulated Solutions, Lonza, Wacker, Mueller Company, and Polartec. In total, Cleveland contains more than 150 manufacturing firms and thirteen Fortune 500 Companies.

Cleveland is the location for the corporate headquarters of Life Care Centers of America, the largest privately held nursing facility company in the US, founded and owned by Forrest Preston. Check Into Cash Inc., the largest privately held payday loan company in the US, was founded in Cleveland in 1993 by businessman Allan Jones. Hardwick Clothes, the oldest tailor-made clothing maker in America, was founded in 1880 and has been headquartered in Cleveland for its entire history. In addition to corporate businesses, Cleveland has a thriving retail sector, located mostly in the northern part of the city. Bradley Square Mall is a shopping mall with more than 50 tenants.

=== Tourism ===
Tourism is a major part of Cleveland's income. Visitors come from all over the country. The Cherokee National Forest in Polk County supports many recreational outdoor activities. The Ocoee and Hiwassee rivers both flow through the forest. Thousands of people raft these rivers annually. The Ocoee River was the site of the canoe slalom events for the 1996 Summer Olympics in Atlanta. Red Clay State Park is a historical site just north of the Georgia state line. The Cherokee held council here after being driven out of Georgia. The Museum Center at Five Points is a history museum and cultural center that features exhibits on the Ocoee Region and surrounding areas. The Ocoee Regional Nature Center is a state-certified arboretum. It houses over 100 types of trees, plants, flowers, and shrubs.

== Arts and culture ==
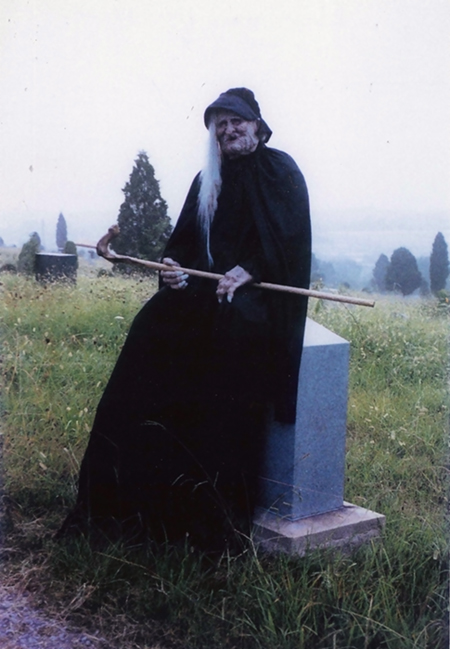
Tall Betsy in Fort Hill Cemetery, 1993

The MainStreet Cleveland Halloween Block Party draws more than 20,000 people to the city every year. The event began in 1988 as a candy handout at the Cleveland Police Department and Centenary Avenue, and has grown to one of the largest events in Cleveland. It features live music, food stands, and a costume contest. In 2015 Cleveland's mayor, Tom Rowland, dubbed the city as the "Halloween capital of the world".

Cleveland is known for Tall Betsy, the official "Halloween goblin of Bradley County". For years, Tall Betsy's Halloween night appearance drew large crowds to Cleveland's Centenary Avenue. The growing crowds inspired MainStreet Cleveland to organize the Halloween Block Party around the event. Local businessman Allan Jones created the modern legend from tales of the Tall Betsy goblin that his grandmother told him as a child. The original legend dates to the 19th century, with print references in the Cleveland Daily Herald as early as 1892. In 1998, Tall Betsy retired after drawing a crowd of over 25,000 people. She returned in 2005 to celebrate her 25th anniversary.

The Cleveland Apple Festival, begun in 2002, is an annual family event held on the third weekend of October. This festival offers a juried art and craft show, live bluegrass music, food booths, pony and a hayride, entertainment, contests and children's activities. Unlike many festivals of its kind in the U.S., the Cleveland Apple Festival does not charge for children to participate in activities provided in the children's area. The festival is operated as a 501(c)(3) public charity.

The city song is "The Diplomat", composed by John Philip Sousa. It debuted as conducted by Sousa in a performance in 1906 at the Craigmiles Opera House. In November 2017, the city celebrated its 175th anniversary.

In 2024, the Tennessee state legislature named hot slaw the first official state food of Tennessee, and Cleveland the hot slaw capital of Tennessee.

== Sports ==
Cleveland currently has no professional sports teams, but has had two minor league baseball teams: the Cleveland Counts from 1911 to 1913 and the Cleveland Manufacturers from 1921 to 1922. Both of these teams were part of the Appalachian League.

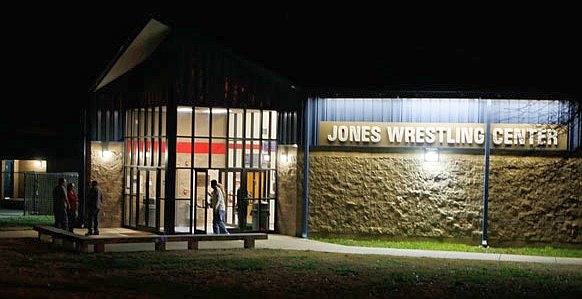
Jones Wrestling Center

Cleveland High School has one of the most successful football programs in Tennessee. It has the second-longest winning streak in Tennessee high school football history, with 54 consecutive wins between 1993 and 1996. The Blue Raiders have also won state championships in 1968, 1993, 1994 and 1995.

The Cleveland High and Bradley Central wrestling teams traditionally dominate the state wrestling championships. Since 1994, the Bradley Central Bears have won a total of 27 state championships Traditional category and 14 state championships in the Dual category, winning a state championship every year in the Traditional category between 1993 and 2017. The Cleveland Blue Raiders, based at the state-of-the-art Jones Wrestling Center,^{[110}^{]} have won a total of 29 traditional championships, most recently in 2023. The Blue Raiders have won state championships in 2011, 2013, 2014, 2015, 2018, 2019, 2020, 2021, as well as 2022, 2023, and 2024.

In 2013, the Cleveland City Council presented a resolution honoring the Cleveland High School wrestling team, and declared February 25 as "Blue Raider Wrestling Day". The Blue Raiders were state champions for the second time in three years after winning the 2013 TSSAA Division I Traditional State Championships and the State Duals Finals. The team was runner-up in both the Duals and State Tournaments in 2012, after claiming the Traditional title in 2011.

== Parks and recreation ==
Several public recreational parks are located within or near Cleveland. They are all maintained by the Cleveland Parks and Recreation department. They allow a variety of activities, and some organized sports teams compete at them. The Cleveland/Bradley County Greenway is an approximately 4.4 mile long greenway path which follows South Mouse Creek from downtown to neighborhoods in the northern part of the city. Other facilities include the Bradley County Park, Kenneth L. Tinsley Park, Greenway Park, Mosby Park, Deer Park, College Hill Recreation Center, Johnston Park, Leonard Fletcher Park, Taylor Spring Park, Cleveland Family YMCA, and the South Cleveland Community Center.

== Government ==
The city of Cleveland operates under a council/manager form of government with an elected mayor and seven council members. Five are elected from single-member districts, and two are elected at-large, as is the mayor. The city council chooses a fellow council member to serve as vice mayor. The city council hires a professional city manager to carry out daily operations. The mayor is Kevin Brooks, who has held that position since September 2018, and the vice mayor is at-large councilman Avery Johnson. The city manager is Joe Fivas, who has held that position since June 2016. Elections are nonpartisan and take place in August of every even year, along with the state primary.

District	Councilman
District 1	Marsha McKenzie
District 2	Bill Estes
District 3	Tom Cassada
District 4	David May, Jr.
District 5	Dale R. Hughes
At-large 1	Avery L. Johnson (vice mayor)
At-large 2	Ken Webb

Most of Cleveland is in the 4th congressional district of Tennessee for the U.S. House of Representatives, represented by Republican Scott DesJarlais. A small amount of the city, including East Cleveland and northeast Cleveland, are in the 3rd congressional district, represented by Republican Chuck Fleischmann. Most of Cleveland is part of District 24 of the Tennessee House of Representatives, represented by Mark Hall. A small part of the city is in District 22, represented by Republican Dan Howell. Most of Cleveland is part of District 9 for the Tennessee Senate, represented by Republican Mike Bell. A small portion of the city is in District 10, represented by Republican Todd Gardenhire.

Cleveland and Bradley County have historically been majority-Republican since the Civil War, as has most of East Tennessee. Through much of the 20th century, Middle and West Tennessee were majority Democrat, which Democrats were made up of conservative whites. As a whole, Tennessee was considered part of the Solid South. Both areas had been slave societies, and West Tennessee was dominated by large cotton plantations, whereas East Tennessee was based in yeoman farmers and little slaveholding. Since the Republican Party's founding, only two Democratic presidential candidates have won Bradley County; Southerner Woodrow Wilson in 1912 and Franklin Delano Roosevelt in 1936, during the Great Depression.

== Education ==
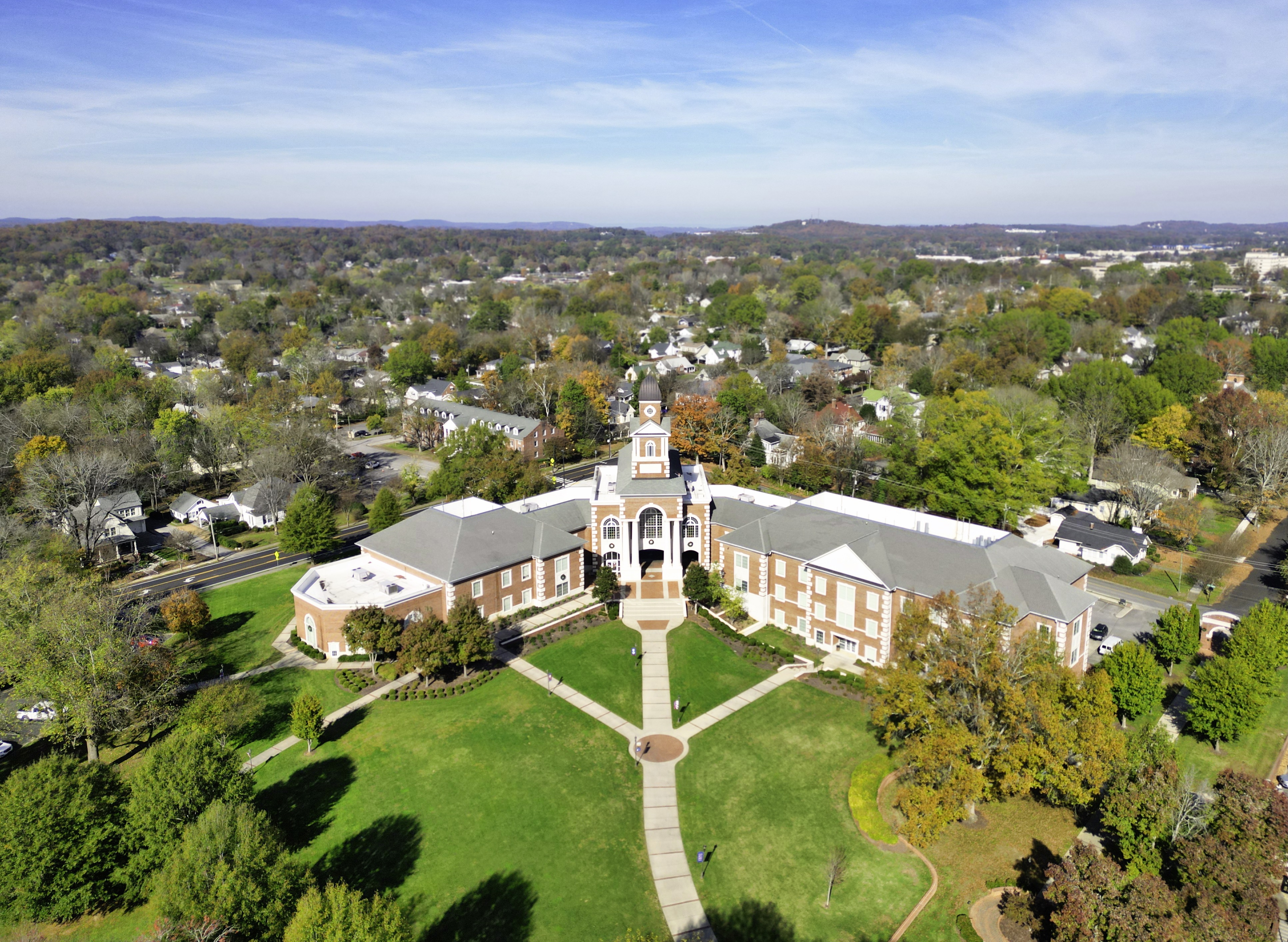
Lee University

Cleveland High School, Bradley Central High School and Walker Valley High School are the three public high schools in Bradley County. Cleveland Middle, Ocoee Middle and Lake Forest are the three middle schools. Cleveland City Schools is a school system for students living within the city limits. Several elementary schools serve students within different sub-district divisions. Some schools maintained by Bradley County Schools are also in the city. Tennessee Christian Preparatory School is a Christian college preparatory school located in Cleveland.

The city is also home to Cleveland State Community College, a unit of the Tennessee Board of Regents, as well as Lee University, the second-largest private, four-year university in the state.

=== Public schools ===
==== High schools ====
- Cleveland High School
- Bradley Central High School
- Walker Valley High School
- Teen Learning Center

=== Private schools ===
- Tennessee Christian Preparatory School
- Cleveland Christian School
- Candies Creek Academy
- Bowman Hills Adventist School
- Shenandoah Baptist Academy
- United Christian Academy
- Vanguard Christian Academy

=== Higher education ===
- Cleveland State Community College
- Lee University
- Pentecostal Theological Seminary
- Church of God School of Ministry

== Media ==
=== Newspapers ===
The Cleveland Daily Banner is the town's newspaper. The paper was first published in 1854. Additionally, the Chattanooga Times Free Press, a paper based in Chattanooga, also serves as a primary source of news for Bradley County residents.

=== Radio ===
Several radio stations located within Chattanooga and neighboring cities serve Cleveland, along with others licensed to Cleveland, which are listed below:

Call sign	Frequency	Format
W207C1 (WAYW)	89.3 FM	WAY-FM, Contemporary Christian
WSAA	93.1 FM	Air 1, Contemporary Christian
WALI	97.1 FM	Lite rock
WOOP-LP	99.9 FM	Bluegrass
WUSY	100.7 FM	Country
W267BI	101.3 FM	Talk
WCLE-FM	104.1 FM	Adult contemporary
W290CA (WTSE)	105.9 FM	Contemporary Christian
WBAC	1340 AM	News/Talk
WCLE-AM	1570 AM	Talk

=== Television ===
Cleveland is served by several TV stations licensed both in the city and neighboring cities. Stations licensed in Cleveland include:

Call sign	Channel	Network
WPDP-CD	25	ABC, Fox, My Network TV
WTNB-CD	27	Heartland
WFLI-TV	42, 53	The CW, Me-TV

== Infrastructure ==
=== Transportation ===
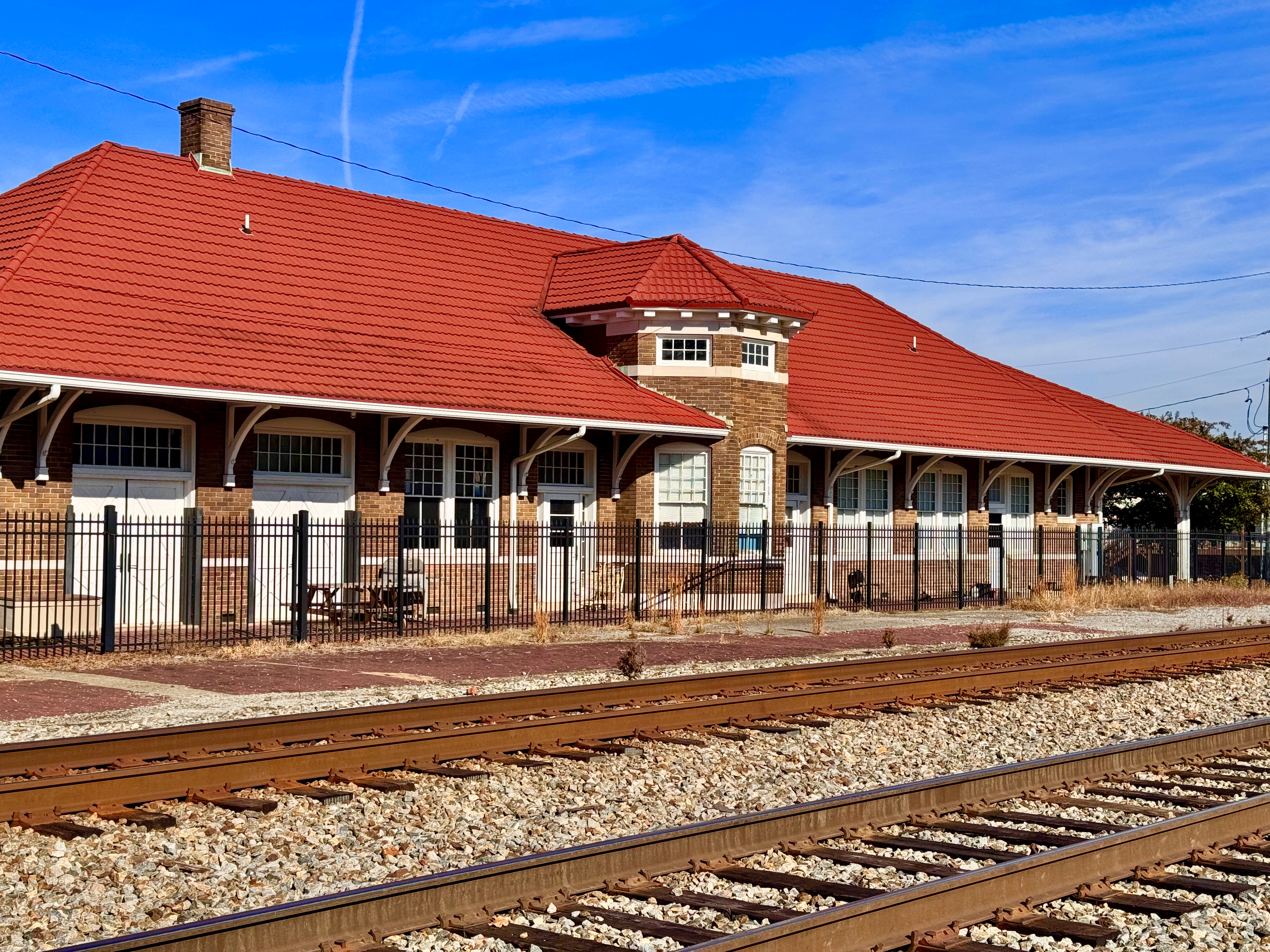
The Cleveland Urban Area Transit System Depot is a historic Southern Railway train station

==== Air ====
Hardwick Field, also known as Cleveland Municipal Airport, was the principal airport from 1955 to 2013. Cleveland Regional Jetport, located approximately two miles east of Hardwick Field opened on January 25, 2013, replacing Hardwick Field. It consists of a 6,200-by-100-foot (1,890 by 30 m) runway.

==== Rail ====
Cleveland is served by the Norfolk Southern Railway, which forks in the city and provides logistics for industries.

Into the late 1960s the Southern Railway operated daily passenger trains through Cleveland station: the Birmingham Special (New York - Birmingham), Pelican (New York - New Orleans) and Tennessean (Washington - Memphis). The last train serving the station was an unnamed remnant of the Birmingham Special on August 11, 1970.

==== Roads ====
The center of Cleveland is at the intersection of U.S. Route 11 and U.S. Route 64. US 11 connects the area with Chattanooga to the south and Athens to the north. The U.S. 11 Bypass (Keith Street) serves as a bypass route for US 11 around downtown, passing approximately 1/2 mile (0.80 km) west of the central business district. U.S. Route 64 connects Cleveland with Murphy, North Carolina, to the east and the Chattanooga area to the southwest. State Route 60 (25th Street) connects Cleveland with Dayton to the northwest and Dalton, Georgia, to the southeast, where the road becomes State Route 71. State Route 74 connects the city to Chatsworth, Georgia, to the south. APD-40, made up of the US 64 Bypass and a section of SR 60, is part of the Appalachian Development Highway System from which it takes its name, and serves as a beltway around the business district. Parts of this beltway are controlled access. Paul Huff Parkway serves as a major thoroughfare on the northern end of the city. Interstate 75 passes through western Cleveland, connecting the area with Knoxville to the north and Chattanooga to the south. I-75 has three exits in the city.

===== Principal highways =====
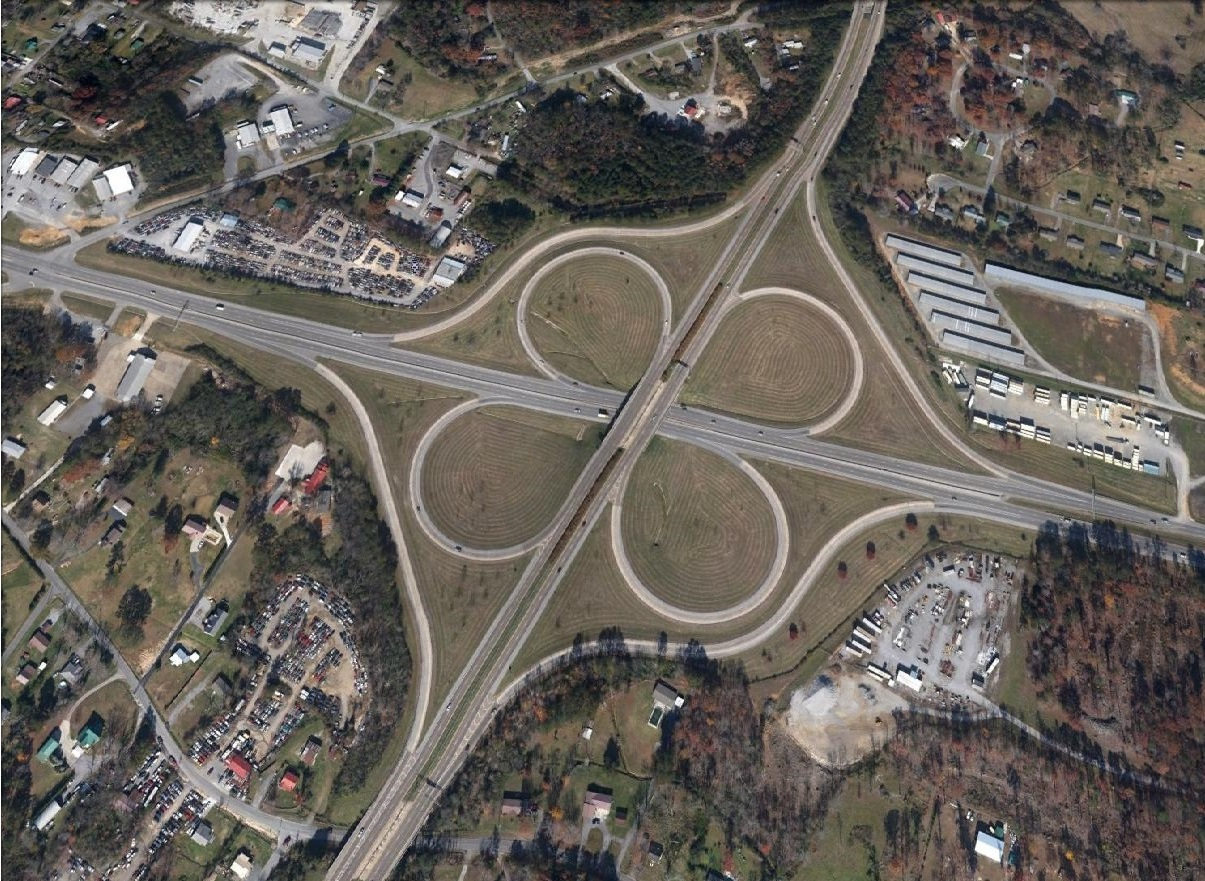
Aerial view of the cloverleaf interchange with APD-40 (US 64 Byp./SR 60) and US 64 (Inman Street, Waterlevel Highway)

- Interstate 75
- US 11
- US 64
- US 64 Bypass
- US 11 Bypass
- US 74
- SR 60
- SR 74
- Paul Huff Parkway

===== Other major roadways =====
- Mouse Creek Road
- Stuart Road
- Peerless Road
- Georgetown Road
- SR 312 (Harrison Pike)
- Freewill Road
- 20th Street NE
- 17th Street NW
- Michigan Avenue Road
- Benton Pike
- Blue Springs Road
- McGrady Drive

==== Public transportation ====
The Cleveland Urban Area Transit System (CUATS) is a bus service operated by the Southeast Tennessee Human Resource Agency (SETHRA) that operates within the city limits of Cleveland and select parts of Bradley County. The city operates on five fixed routes. A Greyhound bus station is located on Paul Huff Parkway just off of I-75 exit 27.

=== Public safety ===
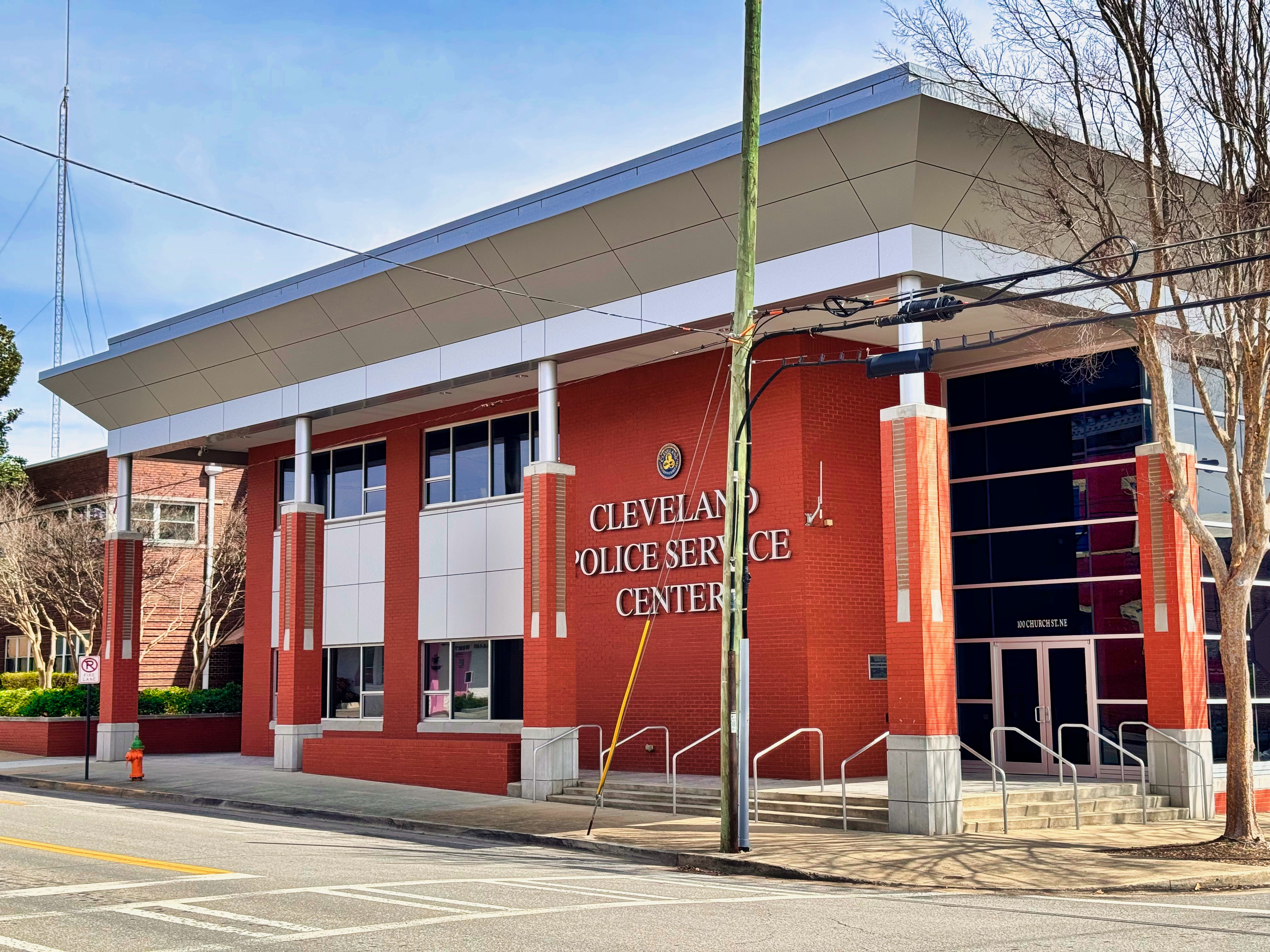
The Cleveland Police Service Center downtown

The Cleveland Fire Department is an all-paid professional department. It currently consists of more than 90 highly trained personnel and 6 stations, and serves an estimated 67,000 people. The Cleveland Police department currently has more than 90 Certified Police Officers, two Codes Enforcement Officers and 11 full-time civilian employees, along with one part-time civilian employee, 13 School Crossing Guards and eight Animal Control employees. They also maintain a Volunteer Program consisting of a 15-member Public Service Unit and a nine-member Chaplain Unit.

=== Healthcare ===
For decades the city had two hospitals. Bradley memorial and Cleveland community. Around 2008 /2009 they were bought out and Cleveland community was discontinued and part of the back half of the hospital turned into dr office now it’s a detox center. The emergency department is still closed. Bradley Memorial had its named changed to Tennova healthcare during the buyout. After that it was Skyride now it’s Vitruvian . It remains as the only hospital and emergency room in Bradley county. Bradley Healthcare & Rehabilitation Center is a nursing home that serves the county. Bradley County Emergency Medical Services is an emergency medical service (EMS) agency of the county government established in 1972 and consists of three stations, eleven ambulances, and six ancillary vehicles, along with more than 60 full-time employees and more than 25 part-time employees.

=== Utilities ===
Cleveland Utilities is a corporate agency owned by the city which provides electric, water, and sewage services to residents of Cleveland and surrounding areas. Cleveland Utilities receives water from the Hiwassee and Tennessee Rivers and a spring in Waterville just southeast of the city, and purchases electricity from the Tennessee Valley Authority, which is delivered via two subtransmission substations in the city. Wastewater is pumped to a treatment facility on the Hiwassee River in northern Bradley County. Natural gas is provided by Chattanooga Gas, a subsidiary of Southern Company. Other local providers include the Hiwassee Utilities Commission, Ocoee Utility District, and Volunteer Electric Cooperative.

=== Public works ===
The Public Works Department performs the most varied actions of all the city departments. It has approximately 51 employees. The department is responsible for the city's fleet operation, sign maintenance and design, and street markings.

== Sister cities ==
- Phnom Penh, Cambodia

== See also ==
- List of cities in Tennessee
- National Register of Historic Places listings in Bradley County, Tennessee
