= Ocoee =

Ocoee may refer to:

- Ocoee, Florida
- Ocoee, Tennessee
- Ocoee Middle School, in Cleveland, Tennessee
- Ocoee Street Historic District
- Toccoa/Ocoee River in Georgia and Tennessee
- USS Ocoee (SP-1208), a United States Navy patrol vessel in commission from 1917 to 1918
- Ocoee, the Cherokee term for the Passiflora incarnata (Purple passionflower)

== See also ==
- Ocoee massacre
- Ocoee dams (disambiguation)
