= Tall Betsy =

Cultural Halloween icon

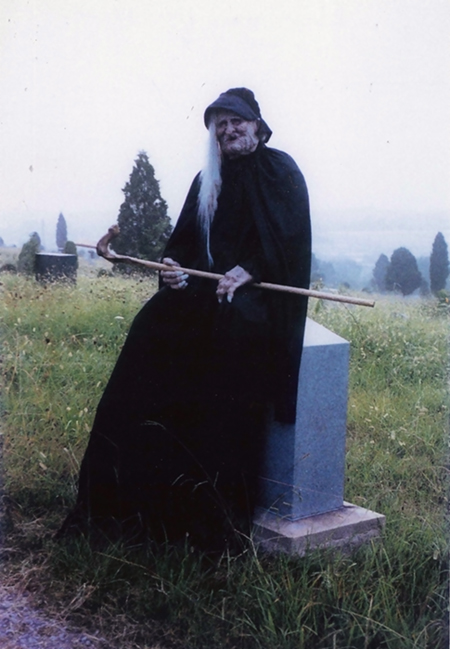
Photo of Tall Betsy in Fort Hill Cemetery, 1993.

Tall Betsy is a cultural Halloween icon originating in Bradley County, Tennessee, United States. Tall Betsy was declared the "Official Halloween Goblin" of Bradley County in 1989.

== Origins ==
Allan Jones, a Cleveland, Tennessee entrepreneur and philanthropist best known as the founder of national payday lender Check Into Cash, capitalized on the Tall Betsy character in 1980.

Jones based the character on stories (local folklore) that were told to his mother, Virginia Slaughter Jones, by her mother, Marie Schultz Slaughter. Virginia and other Cleveland children being raised during the 1930s were told by their parents that if they failed to come home before dark they would likely encounter Tall Betsy, sometimes called Black Betsy or simply "The Lady in Black."

Tall Betsy last appeared in 1998 after drawing a Halloween crowd of 25,000, although no explanation was ever given for the goblin's disappearance. Jones later told a reporter that while the goblin may have vanished, her spirit is embedded in the hearts and minds of the Cleveland residents who saw Tall Betsy during the eighteen years from 1980 to 1998.

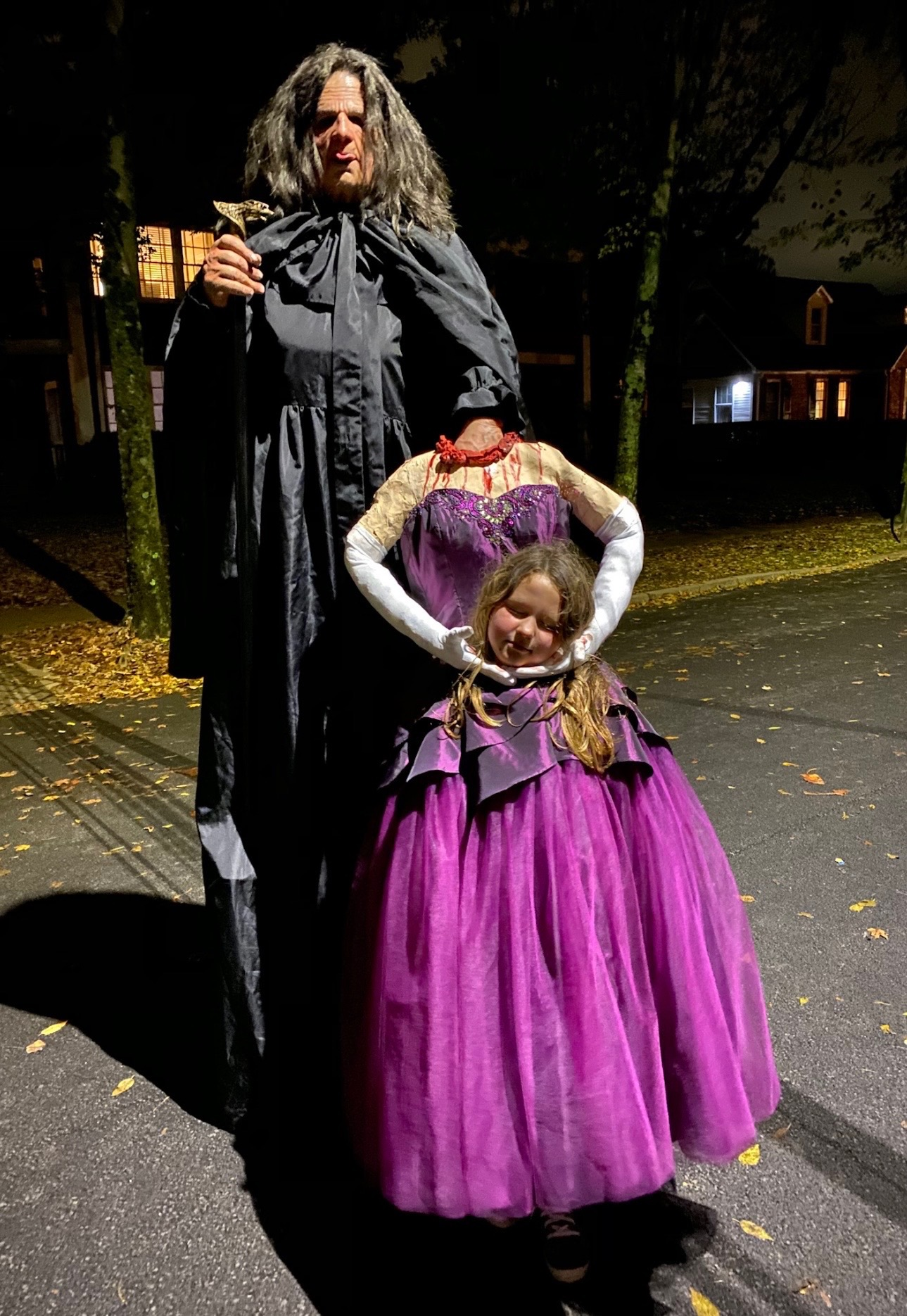
Tall Betsy Halloween Night

The 2005 Block Party was dedicated in honor of Tall Betsy's 25th anniversary. The Block Party drew the largest crowd in the event's history. Jones arranged for nationally recognized celebrities such as the cast of "Leave It To Beaver" and Little Richard to entertain the more than 30,000 attendees. In 2014, Jones' son, Bailey, assumed the identity of Tall Betsy and has appeared as the goblin each year since at the Halloween Block Party.

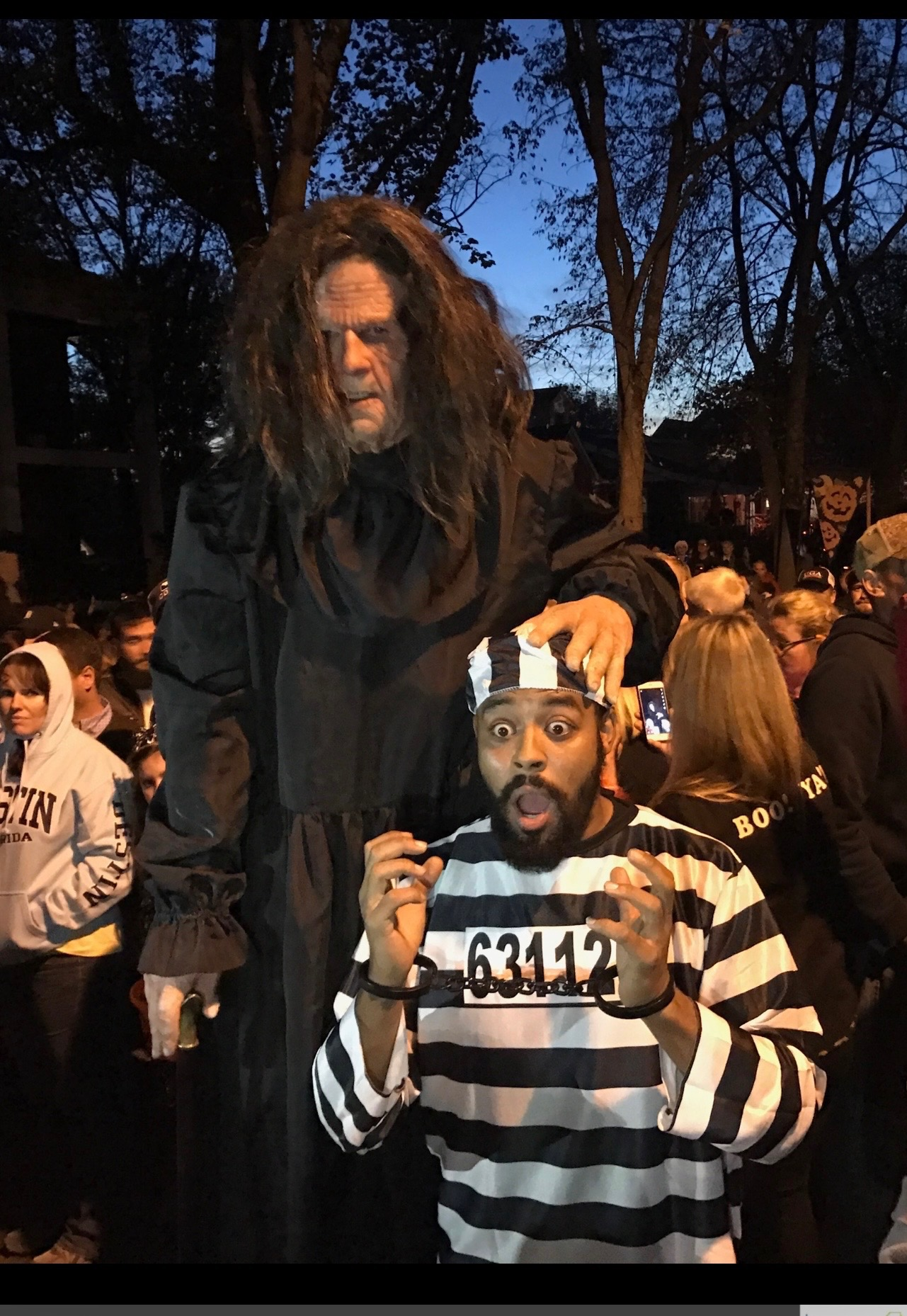
Tall Betsy on Halloween 2017 with crowd

== Recognition ==
On May 24, 1989, the Tennessee legislature declared Tall Betsy as "the official Halloween goblin of Bradley County".

In 2011 Tall Betsy was the subject of a documentary by Zac Adams. It was narrated by Lynn Hoffman, host of A&E's "Private Sessions."
