= Hardwick Clothes =

American clothing manufacturer

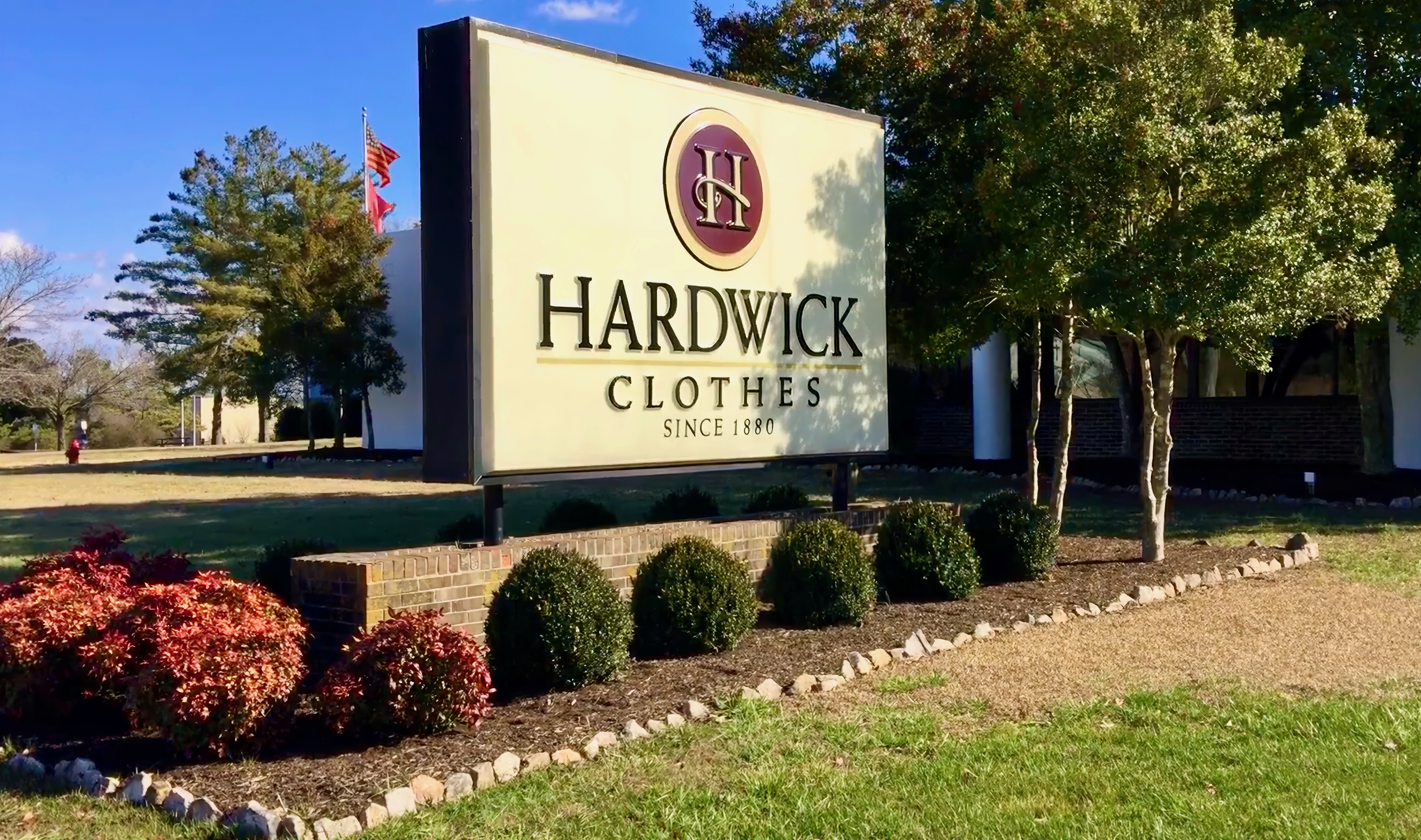
- Company type: Privately Held Company
- Industry: Clothing Manufacturer
- Founded: 1880
- Headquarters: Cleveland, Tennessee
- Area served: United States
- Key people: Allan Jones (Owner/Chairman) Bruce Bellusci (CEO/President)
- Website: www.hardwickclothes.com

Hardwick Clothes is an American clothing manufacturer headquartered in Cleveland, Tennessee specializing in tailor-made suits for men and women. Founded on July 28, 1880, Hardwick Clothes is the second-oldest company in Bradley County, Tennessee.

== History ==
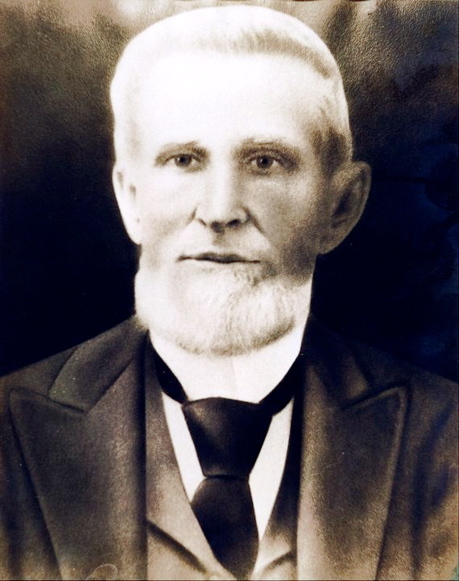
C.L. Hardwick, founder of Hardwick Clothes

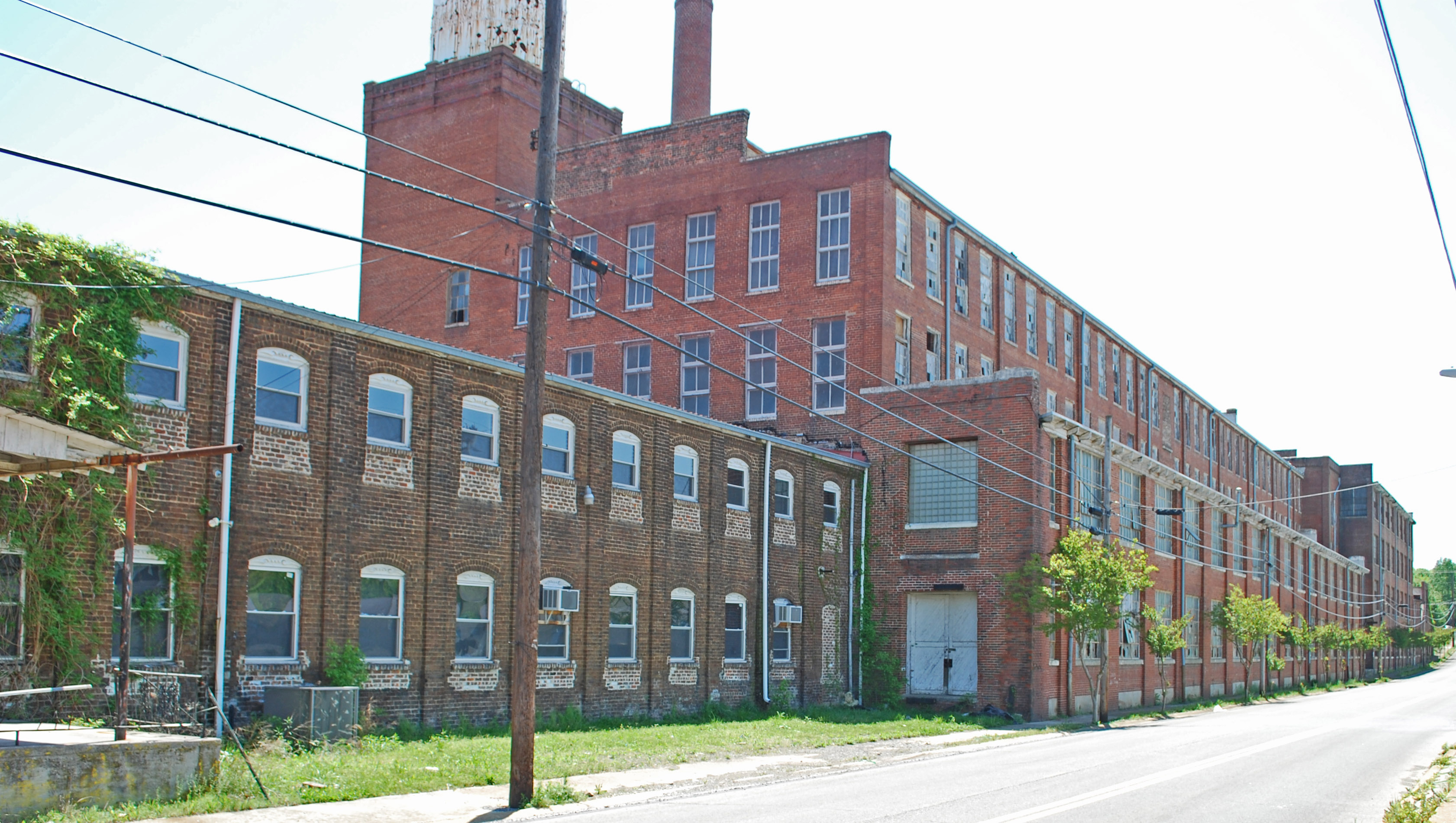
Old Hardwick Woolen Mills factory building in Cleveland, Tennessee

The company started as Cleveland Woolen Mills, founded in 1880 in Cleveland, Tennessee, by C. L. Hardwick, John Craigmiles, John Parker, P.B. Mayfield and Creed Bates. Hardwick put his son George, in charge of the clothing company, while his son Joseph ran the family's other company, Hardwick Stove. The company achieved early success from weaving "jean cloth," a blend (76% wool, 24% cotton) that was crafted into a popular product known as "Dollar Pants."

Over the years, the company added modern machinery, and eventually Cleveland Woolen Mills evolved into a manufacturing plant, as well as a mill. In 1925, the name was changed to Hardwick Woolen Mills. By the 1920s Hardwick Woolen Mills had expanded its operations, weaving the wool yarn and tailoring finished garments in the same factory. The integrated operation reflected the company motto: "From the sheep's back to the clothing rack." Among the many garments produced were men's suits, overcoats, knickers and boys' wear.

Hardwick Mills survived the Great Depression as a cottage industry, with much of the sewing done in the homes of workers. Despite the poor economy, Hardwick Mills continued to grow during the 1930s. After the New Deal introduced labor laws regulating working hours, production moved back into the factory.

For the first half of the 20th century, Hardwick Mills was one of the largest manufacturers of wool fabric and men's clothing in the world. During World War II, Hardwick Mills manufactured uniforms for the military. After the war, the demand for wool decreased with the introduction of synthetic fabrics.

In the 1950s, Hardwick Mills sold its woolen operations to focus on the men's tailored clothing market. During this time, the company rebranded itself as Hardwick Clothes, Inc. The company also ended its status as a private label and, for the first time, began to advertise. Hardwick soon became a leader in the market for blazers, boasting one of the largest in-stock blazer programs in the industry.

In 1974, Hardwick Clothes moved from its original factory on Church Street to a modern 175,000-sq.-ft. manufacturing plant on the north side of Cleveland. The new facility allowed the company to modernize its equipment to remain competitive against overseas competition.

In the 21st century Hardwick expanded its base of specialty-store retailers with catalog and department store accounts. Its domestic clothing production has enabled the company to land contracts with organizations as diverse as the U.S. military and Major League Baseball umpires.

In 2001, the old Hardwick Woolen Mills factory was listed in the National Register of Historic Places.

== Recent history ==
In 2013, due to the struggling economy, Hardwick Clothes faced problems with creditors and an underfunded pension plan that covers more than 600 employees and retirees. The Pension Benefit Guaranty Corporation had demanded a payment of more than $7 million that coincided with the company's discontinuation of its pension plan due to a slowing of the marketplace. The payment was expected within days after the notice was received by Hardwick, causing the company to file for bankruptcy protection.

In March 2014, Cleveland businessman W. Allan Jones made a $1.9 million offer to purchase the company, and on June 19, 2014, the sale was completed. Jones owns a number of consumer financial services companies, such as Check Into Cash, Loan by Phone, U.S. Money Shops, Buy Here Pay Here USA, and LendingFrog.com.

Upon completion of the sale, Jones told the media, "Since that first day, the company has survived two major fires, two World Wars, the Great Depression, leisure suits, NAFTA and – worst of all – making us watch China manufacture our Olympic team's blazers." Jones also launched a new website for the company—Hardwick.com.

In July 2014, Bruce Bellusci was named the new CEO/President, becoming the ninth CEO/President of Hardwick Clothes in the company's history. Bellusci worked at Hart Schaffner Marx for 34 years, serving as executive vice president since 2006. Bellusci made several notable hires within his first few months, including several salesmen and the VP of Technical Design, Jeffery Diduch, from the Hart Schaffner Marx organization. Diduch now serves as Hardwick Clothes Chief Creative Officer where he oversees all design, technical development, and creative direction for the brand. The company also announced it will be flying over its factory the original 38-star American flag from 1880, the year it was founded.

Jones told the media in 2015 that he would help the stable southern workforce at Hardwick to reach new levels of productivity by purchasing state-of-the-art German and Italian automation technology. Jones said the addition of the technology would make Hardwick the most modern sewing operation of its kind in the United States.

On December 15, 2019, Puerto Rican Industries for the Blind acquired Hardwick Clothes.

== See also ==
- Hartmarx
- Oxxford Clothes
- Paul Stuart
- Hickey Freeman
- Brooks Brothers
- J. Press
