= Cleveland station (Southern Railway) =

- Cleveland Southern Railway Depot
- U.S. National Register of Historic Places
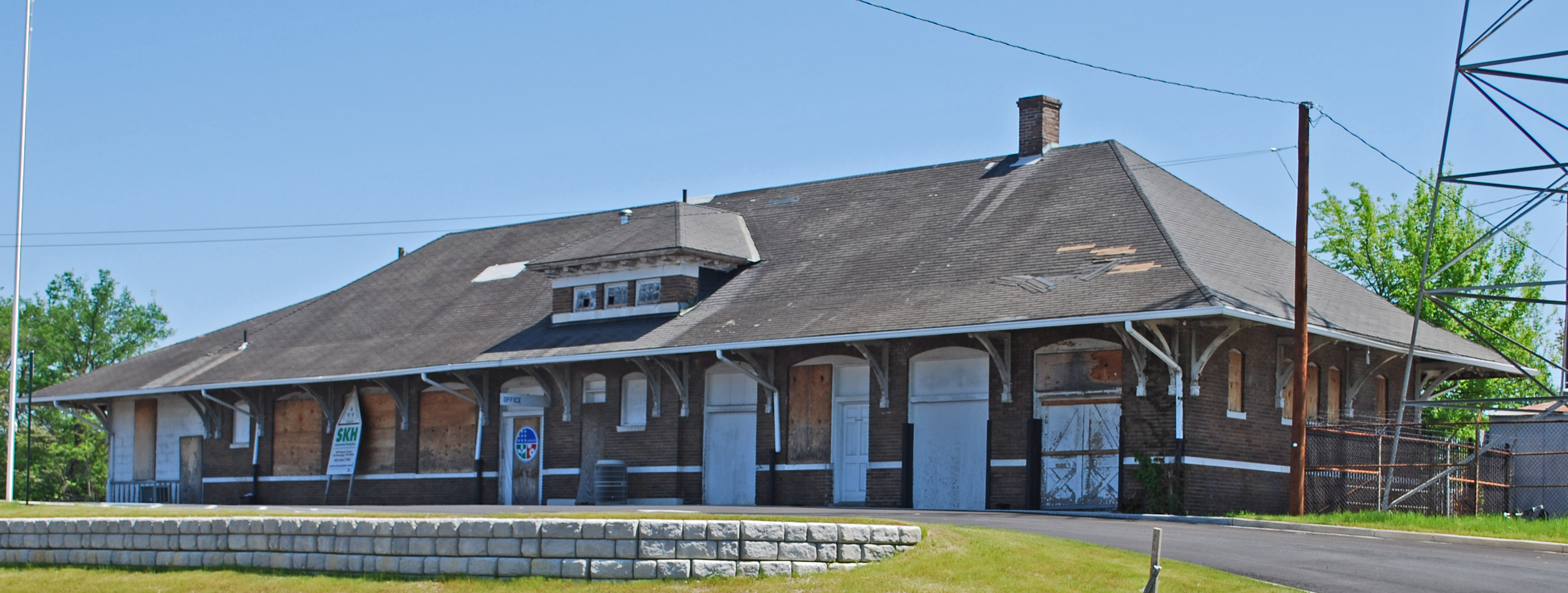
- Location: 175 Edwards St. Cleveland, Tennessee
- Coordinates: 35°09′24″N 84°52′23″W
- NRHP reference No.: 08000235
- Added to NRHP: March 27, 2008

Cleveland Southern Railway Depot is a former railway station in Cleveland, Tennessee. The station was established by the Southern Railway in 1869. By the early 1900s, the station had become too small for its traffic load. The railroad purchased the land just to the north of the original station in 1909. It opened in 1911. Rail service ended on August 11, 1970. It was added to the National Register of Historic Places on March 27, 2008; the building was unused by that time. The original 1869-built station exists as Norfolk Southern Railway offices.

| Preceding station | Southern Railway | Following station |
|---|---|---|
| McDonald toward Memphis | Memphis – Bristol | Tasso toward Bristol |
