= Burlington Heights, Cleveland =

Coordinates: 35.204°N 84.861°W

Burlington Heights is a neighborhood located within the city of Cleveland, Tennessee.

== Geography ==
The community is predominantly residential, with a few industries. Burlington Heights is located in northern Cleveland between Interstate 75 on the west, Paul Huff Parkway on the north, and the U.S. Route 11 Bypass (Keith Street) on the east. State Route 60 is located a short distance south of the community. Peerless Road, which connects Paul Huff Parkway to S.R. 60, and Mouse Creek Road, which connects Paul Huff Parkway to U.S. 11, are two main thoroughfares. Cleveland High School, the city's main high school, is located on the south end of the community.

The neighborhood takes its name from the former woolen mill located within the community operated Peerless Woolen Mills, a subsidiary of Burlington Industries, which was completed in February 1956. The plant has been occupied by Mars, Incorporated since 1978, which manufactures M&M's and Twix bars at the site. Mallory Battery Company, now Duracell, opened a manufacturing plant on the eastern end of the community in 1961. The residential subdivisions within the neighborhood were developed in the late 1950s and 1960s, primarily to serve employees of the industries.
