= Taylor Spring Park =

Park in Cleveland, Tennessee

Coordinates: 35°09′39″N 84°52′41″W

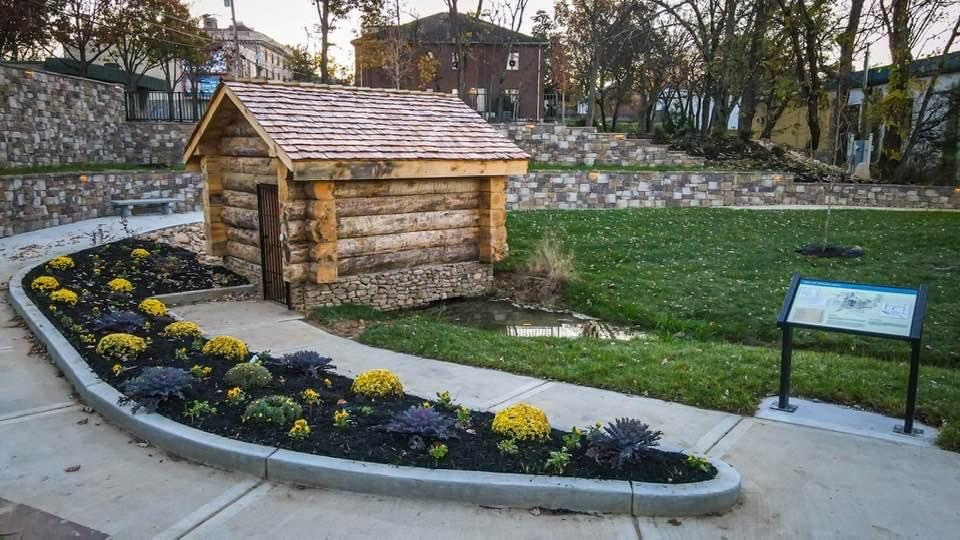
Taylor Spring Park

Taylor Spring Park is a historic park in Cleveland, Tennessee. The park is named after the city's first settler, Andrew Taylor. The name also refers to a natural spring on Taylor's property that attracted other settlers to the area.

The park was in the planning stages for over 30 years on an area of land that has been called the “birthplace” of the city of Cleveland. It is named after a spring that was located on settler Andrew Taylor's property in 1836 and was the deciding factor in where the city of Cleveland would be located.

According to historical records, Andrew Taylor erected a log cabin near the spring. The park features a historically accurate recreation of the Taylor Spring House, made of round logs 12 feet by 12 feet. The Spring House is an exact replica built on information obtained by researcher Michael Slaughter who was hired to research Taylor by businessman Allan Jones. The information came from an 1836 property assessment that provided the earliest known description of Taylor's property, called Taylor's Place.

In 1940, the spring was covered by a business called Gannaway Hardware. The owner of the store used the spring as an air conditioner by pumping water to a radiator with a fan. After the hardware store closed a law office opened on the site, owned by local attorney Jim Webb. Businessman Allan Jones found the spring in Webb's basement and led the campaign to build Taylor Spring Park.

Prior to his death, Webb donated the land to the city so that a park could be erected.
