= Ocoee dams =

Ocoee dams refers to three hydroelectric generating facilities in Tennessee operated by the Tennessee Valley Authority:

- Ocoee Dam No. 1, located 12 miles (19 km) above the mouth of the river; impounds Parksville Lake
- Ocoee Dam No. 2, located 24 miles (39 km) above the mouth of the river; impounds Ocoee Reservoir No. 2
- Ocoee Dam No. 3, located 29 miles (47 km) above the mouth of the river; impounds Ocoee Reservoir No. 3

== See also ==
- Ocoee (disambiguation)
