= Renfro Foods =

American food manufacturer specializing in salsa

Renfro Foods, Inc.
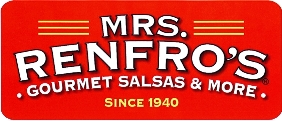
- Industry: Specialty Food Manufacturing
- Predecessor: George Renfro Food Company
- Founder: George and Arthurine Renfro
- Headquarters: Fort Worth, Texas, U.S.A.
- Area served: U.S., Canada, the Caribbean, England, India, Spain, Australia
- Products: Salsas, sauces, barbecue sauces, nacho cheese sauces, relishes
- Website: www.renfrofoods.com

Renfro Foods, Inc. is a privately owned, award-winning producer of specialty food products, particularly salsas and sauces, including 30 Mrs. Renfro’s products, located in Fort Worth, Texas. Founded in 1940 as the George Renfro Food Company, Renfro Foods is now owned and managed by the second and third generations of the Renfro family. Its products are sold in the United States, the Caribbean, Canada and the U.K.

== History ==
Renfro Foods was founded in 1940 as The George Renfro Food Company in the north Fort Worth, Texas garage of George and Arthurine Renfro; the company started there as a packaged spices and pepper sauce business.

In 1948, the company bought a local syrup manufacturer and Dixieland Syrups soon had wide distribution throughout Texas grocery stores. Four years later, Renfro acquired the formulas of Gold Star Foods and reworked the ingredients to make them taste more like family recipes. Before long, the company entered the jelly, preserve, vinegar and chow-chow business as well. By 1963, company sales had more than quadrupled.

In 1972, shortly after incorporating under its current name, Renfro Foods, Inc., the family purchased the recipes of Olé Foods, a Mexican-style hot sauce maker. They re-worked the basic taco sauce ingredients of Olé Foods, and created a richer and tastier salsa recipe. Following George's death in 1975, Arthurine and sons, Bill and Jack, led the company's expansion into mild sauces and a variety of picantes and medium-style sauces.

== Products ==
In 1995, Renfro Foods introduced two gourmet salsas: Black Bean and Habanero. In 1997, Peach, Chipotle Corn and Roasted salsas were added. Garlic salsa joined the product line-up in 2001. At the same time, Renfro Foods began labeling in French and Spanish to increase its global presence with product distribution in new international markets. In 2003, Raspberry Chipotle Salsa was introduced, followed by Mango Habanero salsa in 2006, solidifying the demand for “sweet heat.”

Three new salsas were launched in 2009: Pomegranate, Tequila and Pineapple, the latter a Scovie Award winner, taking first place honors at the 2010 Fiery Foods & BBQ Show’s Scovie Awards Competition, the world's leading recognition for hot and spicy products.

In 2010, Renfro Foods debuted Ghost Pepper salsa , its hottest salsa to date. It is made with the Bhut Jolokia pepper, also known as the ghost pepper. Ghost Pepper became the company’s fastest-growing new product, and is also a 2011 Scovie Award winner.

In 2015, the company expanded its barbecue sauce category by offering new flavor options like it did with its nacho cheese sauce. The barbecue sauce line is gluten-free and the high-fructose corn syrup was removed. It introduced two hot new flavors: Mrs. Renfro's Chipotle BBQ Sauce and Mrs. Renfro's Ghost Pepper BBQ Sauce.

In 2016, Renfro Foods introduced a holiday-themed Pumpkin salsa, offering a spice mix of pumpkin pie with a medium heat level.

== Awards ==
Mrs. Renfro’s Habanero salsa was named among the “Best 125 Packaged Foods for Women” by Women's Health in October 2010.

== Community involvement ==
In 2007, Renfro Foods launched its Pink Lid Breast Cancer Awareness Campaign in conjunction with National Breast Cancer Awareness Month. Every October, a group of select salsas are re-fitted with a pink lid and pink lid label, and a portion of the sales from these products are donated to institutions and organizations involved in breast cancer and cancer research. To date, Renfro Foods has donated more than $100,000 to these entities in the United States and Canada.

In 2011, the company teamed up with New Mexico State University's Chile Pepper Institute (CPI) in Las Cruces, N.M., and other chile pepper industry related businesses in support of creating a permanent research endowment for the Institute. The Chile Pepper Institute is the only international nonprofit organization devoted to education, research, and archiving information related to chile peppers. To commemorate this, a new Mrs. Renfro's Ghost Pepper Salsa lid was created that features ghost peppers emblazoned in fire, along with information about CPI on the Ghost Pepper Salsa label. A portion of sales from Mrs. Renfro's Ghost Pepper Salsa, was earmarked for the Institute's endowed chair.

Renfro Foods and the Renfro Family have been featured in multiple publications, including the Fort Worth Business Press, Dallas Business Journal, Fort Worth, Texas Magazine, Southern Living, and TCU Magazine.
