= Peerless Woolen Mills =

Peerless Woolen Mills was a subsidiary of Burlington Industries which maintained plants in Cleveland, Tennessee, Rossville, Georgia, and Tifton, Georgia between 1951 - 1961. Burlington Industries closed the two Georgia production sites in 1961.

== History of business ==
The textile maker made a large addition to an existing mill in Chattanooga, Tennessee in 1925. At this time the Tennessee city was the second largest producer of hosiery in the United States.

Peerless Woolen Mills built a new manufacturing plant in Cleveland, Tennessee in 1955. Formerly it operated in buildings leased from Hardwick Woolen Mills, starting in 1951. A 250,000-square-foot (23,000 m^{2}) plant, the new facility was engaged in preparing weaving and finishing operations. It opened in February 1956.

The Rossville operation was liquidated and the Tifton plant was sold to the J.P. Stevens Textile Corporation. In November 1961 a Federal judge ruled that Burlington Industries could close the Peerless Plant in Rossville without engaging in collective bargaining with a union there. He denied a National Labor Relations Board injunction. The NLRB had asked for the injunction when members of the Allied Industrial Workers contended the mill was being shut down to avoid collective bargaining. In November 1961, the NLRB studied whether to appeal the judge's ruling because the company's union won the right to represent workers in August 1961, a month before the plant was closed down.
