= Tennessee Christian Preparatory School =

Location
- 4995 North Lee Highway; Cleveland, Tennessee; United States; 35.2217°N 84.8246°W

Information
- Type: Private
- Religious affiliation: Christian
- Established: 1997
- Faculty: 31.6 (on FTE basis)
- Grades: PreK–12
- Enrollment: 372 (2009–10)
- Student to teacher ratio: 5.4:1
- Website: https://www.tennesseechristian.org/

Tennessee Christian Preparatory School (TCPS), formerly Tennessee Christian Academy (TCA) is a private Christian college preparatory school located in Cleveland, Tennessee. It is the only state-accredited private college preparatory school in the immediate area.

== History ==
TCPS was founded in 1997 by a group of parents committed to Christian education. When initially founded, the school was named Tennessee Christian Academy. In 2008, school administrators increased academic rigor, tightened admissions policies and began to focus on providing college-preparatory education for all students. It was at this time that the school took on its current name, Tennessee Christian Preparatory School. In 2015, TCPS was the only private school in Tennessee to be recognized as a National Blue Ribbon School of Excellence.

=== Campus ===
Currently, TCPS leases its campus on the former site of Tomlinson College of the Church of God of Prophecy. As the Church of God of Prophecy has announced plans to revive their college on the campus, TCPS has acquired property for a new campus.

=== Academics and Accreditation ===
Tennessee Christian Preparatory School (TCPS) offers a college-preparatory curriculum designed to equip students for post-secondary success. The academic program includes Advanced Placement (AP) courses and dual-enrollment opportunities in partnership with local colleges and universities.

The school emphasizes a liberal arts foundation, with coursework in English, mathematics, science, social studies, and fine arts, complemented by Bible instruction at every grade level. TCPS integrates a Biblical worldview throughout its curriculum and encourages spiritual development alongside academic rigor.

TCPS is accredited by both the Association of Christian Schools International (ACSI) and Cognia (formerly AdvancED), meeting regional and national standards for private education. Graduates from TCPS fulfill all requirements for a Tennessee high school diploma.

=== 2025 Discrimination controversy ===
In May 2025, Tennessee Christian Preparatory School (TCPS) in Cleveland, Tennessee, became the subject of national attention following allegations that it penalized a graduating senior, Morgan Armstrong, after she publicly came out as gay on social media.

According to a lawsuit filed by Armstrong, after she posted photos with her girlfriend on Instagram, TCPS suspended her for the remainder of the academic year, barred her from attending graduation and other school events, and threatened to withhold her diploma. The school’s disciplinary letter cited a private message Armstrong had sent to friends, which included critical remarks about certain individuals, as a violation of the school’s social media policy. Her attorney contended that the message did not reference the school or its community and argued that the school’s actions were discriminatory and inconsistent with its own disciplinary guidelines, which typically prescribe a one-day suspension for first-time social media infractions. In response, TCPS denied the allegations, stating that the claims in the lawsuit were misleading.
