= Ocoee Street Historic District =

Historic district in Tennessee, United States

- U.S. National Register of Historic Places
- U.S. Historic district
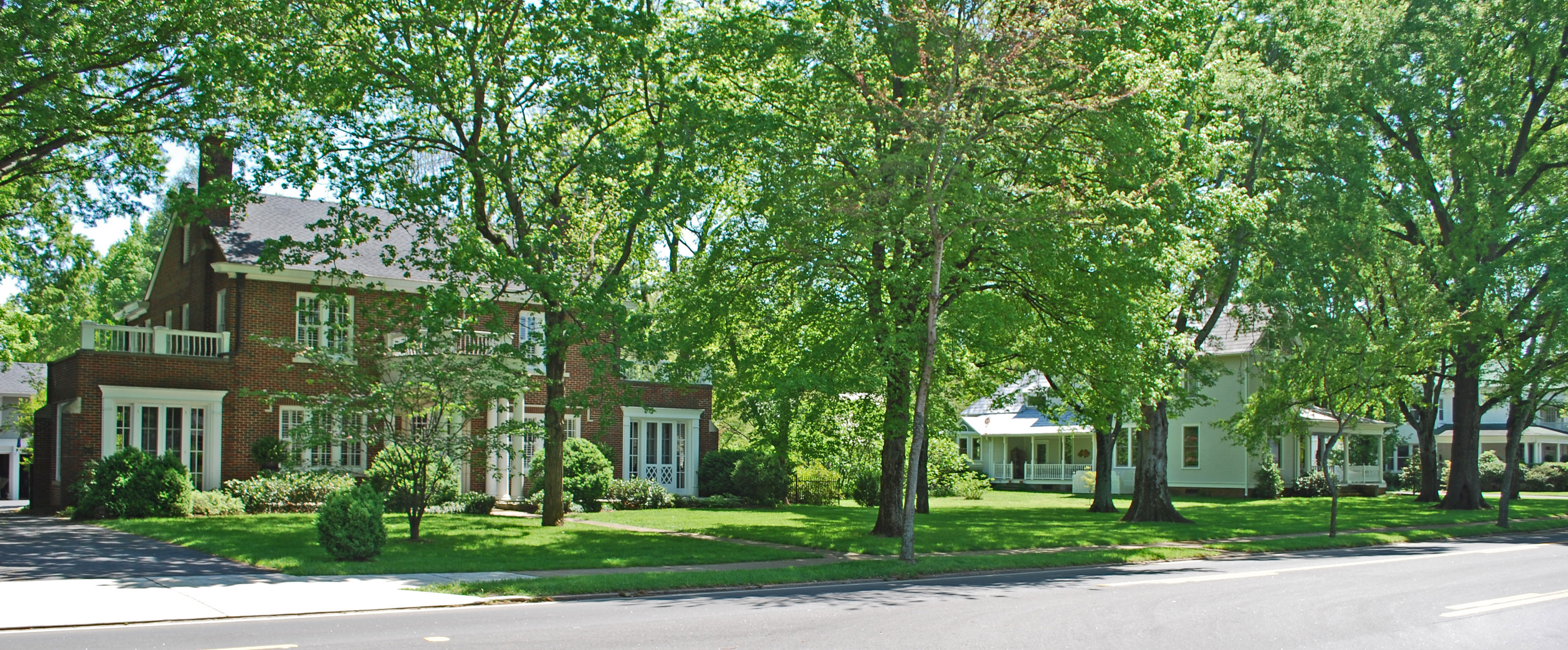
- Historic homes of the Ocoee Street Historic District

- Location within Tennessee Location within the United States
- Location: 1455--1981 N. Ocoee St., Cleveland, Tennessee
- Coordinates: 35.17°N 84.871111°W
- Area: 16 acres (6.5 ha)
- Architect: Multiple
- Architectural style: Colonial Revival, Tudor Revival, Queen Anne
- NRHP reference No.: 95001447
- Added to NRHP: December 13, 1995

The Ocoee Street Historic District is a historic district and neighborhood located in downtown Cleveland, Tennessee, along U.S. Route 11 that was listed on the National Register of Historic Places (NRHP) on December 13, 1995. It is located adjacent to the Centenary Avenue Historic District consists of many homes individually listed on the NRHP.

== Description ==
The NRHP listing defines the historic district as being located between the 1455 and 1981 block of North Ocoee Street just north of the downtown business district near Lee University. However most consider the district to stretch to near the center of the downtown business district, encompassing other historic homes, including the P.M. Craigmiles House. The district consists of multiple homes in Colonial Revival (more than 70 percent), Tudor Revival, and Queen Anne architectural styles, many built before 1900.

The listing included 40 contributing buildings and two contributing structures on 16 acres (6.5 ha).

== See also ==
- National Register of Historic Places listings in Bradley County, Tennessee
- Centenary Avenue Historic District, also NRHP-listed in Cleveland
- Cleveland Commercial Historic District, also NRHP-listed in Cleveland
