= Burlington Heights, New Jersey =

Populated place in Monmouth County, New Jersey, US

- Unincorporated community
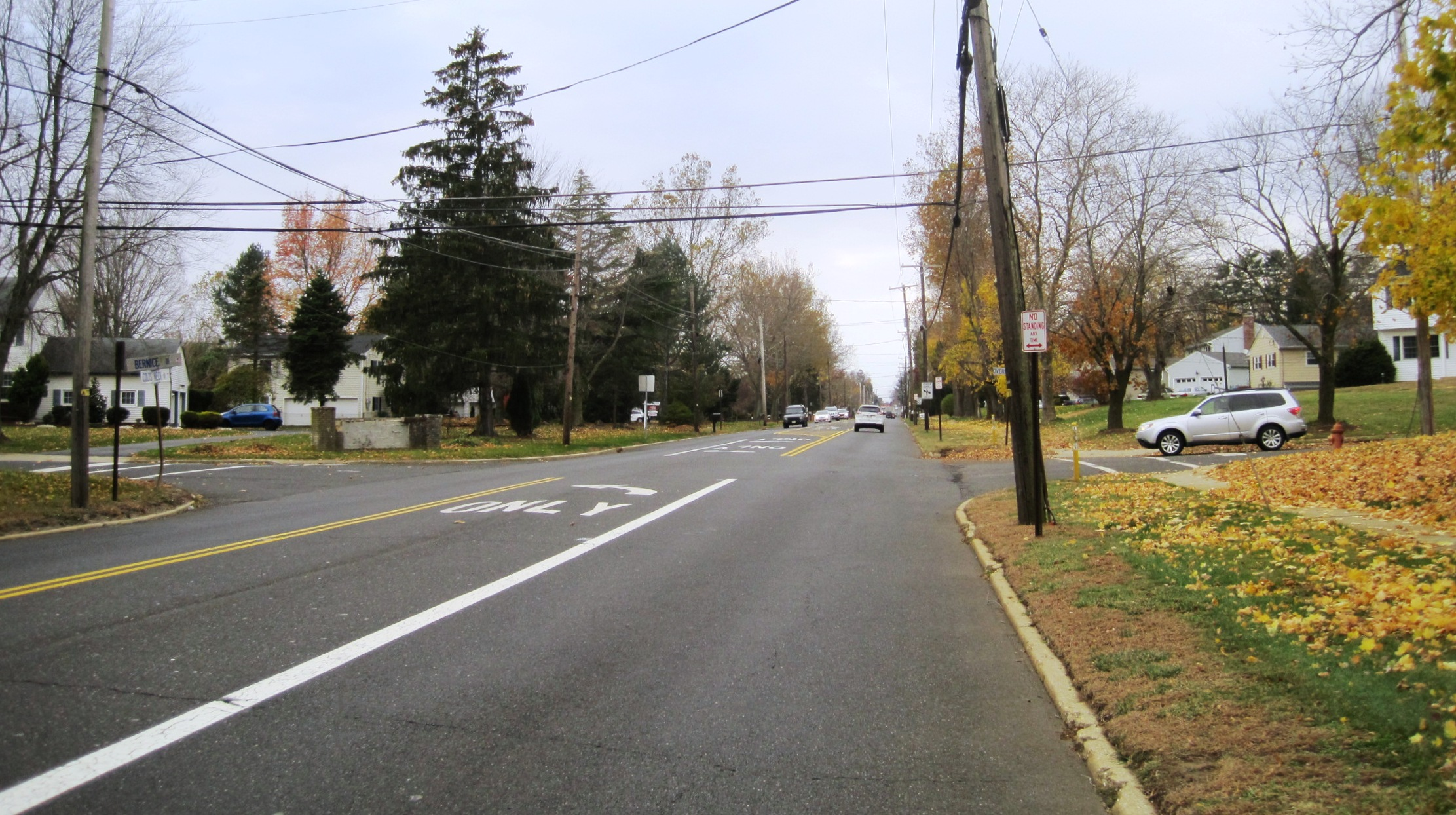
- Looking west along Colts Neck Road (County Route 537)

- Location within Monmouth County, New Jersey Location within New Jersey Location within the United States
- Coordinates: 40°16′18″N 74°14′09″W
- Country: United States
- State: New Jersey
- County: Monmouth
- Township: Freehold
- Elevation: 128 ft (39 m)
- GNIS feature ID: 883511

Burlington Heights is an unincorporated community located within Freehold Township in Monmouth County, in the U.S. state of New Jersey. The community was created in the early 1960s and originally consisted of 112 homes of mixed styles designed by Peter Petillo and Associates of Freehold. It is located along Colts Neck Road (County Route 537) on the east side of the township, near New Jersey Route 18 and the Colts Neck municipal line.
