= Hardwick Field =

Hardwick Field Cleveland Municipal Airport
- IATA: none; ICAO: KHDI; FAA LID: HDI

Summary
- Airport type: Public
- Owner: City of Cleveland
- Serves: Cleveland, Tennessee
- Location: 405 Airport Rd NW; Cleveland, Tennessee 37312
- Opened: 1955
- Closed: December 31, 2013
- Elevation AMSL: 874 ft (266 m)
- Coordinates: 35°13′12″N 084°49′57″W

Map
- Location of airport in Tennessee

Runways
Direction	Length		Surface
Direction	ft	m	Surface
3/21	3,300	1,006	Asphalt

Statistics (1999)
- Aircraft operations: 12,197
- Based aircraft: 40
- Source: Federal Aviation Administration

Hardwick Field (ICAO: KHDI, FAA LID: HDI), also known as Cleveland Municipal Airport, was a public airport located four miles (6 km) northeast of the central business district of Cleveland, in Bradley County, Tennessee, United States. It opened in 1955 and was owned by the City of Cleveland.

Although most U.S. airports used the same three-letter location identifier for the FAA and IATA, Hardwick Field was assigned HDI by the FAA but had no designation from the IATA.

Cleveland Regional Jetport opened on January 25, 2013, approximately two miles east of Hardwick Field, and consists of a 6,200 foot by 100 foot runway. It was created to replace Hardwick Field, which closed on December 31, 2013.

== Facilities and aircraft ==
Hardwick Field covered an area of 103 acres (42 ha) which contained one asphalt paved runway (3/21) measuring 3,300 x 75 ft (1,006 x 23 m).

For the 12-month period ending March 4, 1999, the airport had 12,197 aircraft operations, an average of 33 per day: 93% general aviation, 7% air taxi and <1% military. There were 40 aircraft based at this airport: 60% single-engine, 38% multi-engine and 3% jet.
