= Cleveland Regional Jetport =

Airport in Tennessee, United States

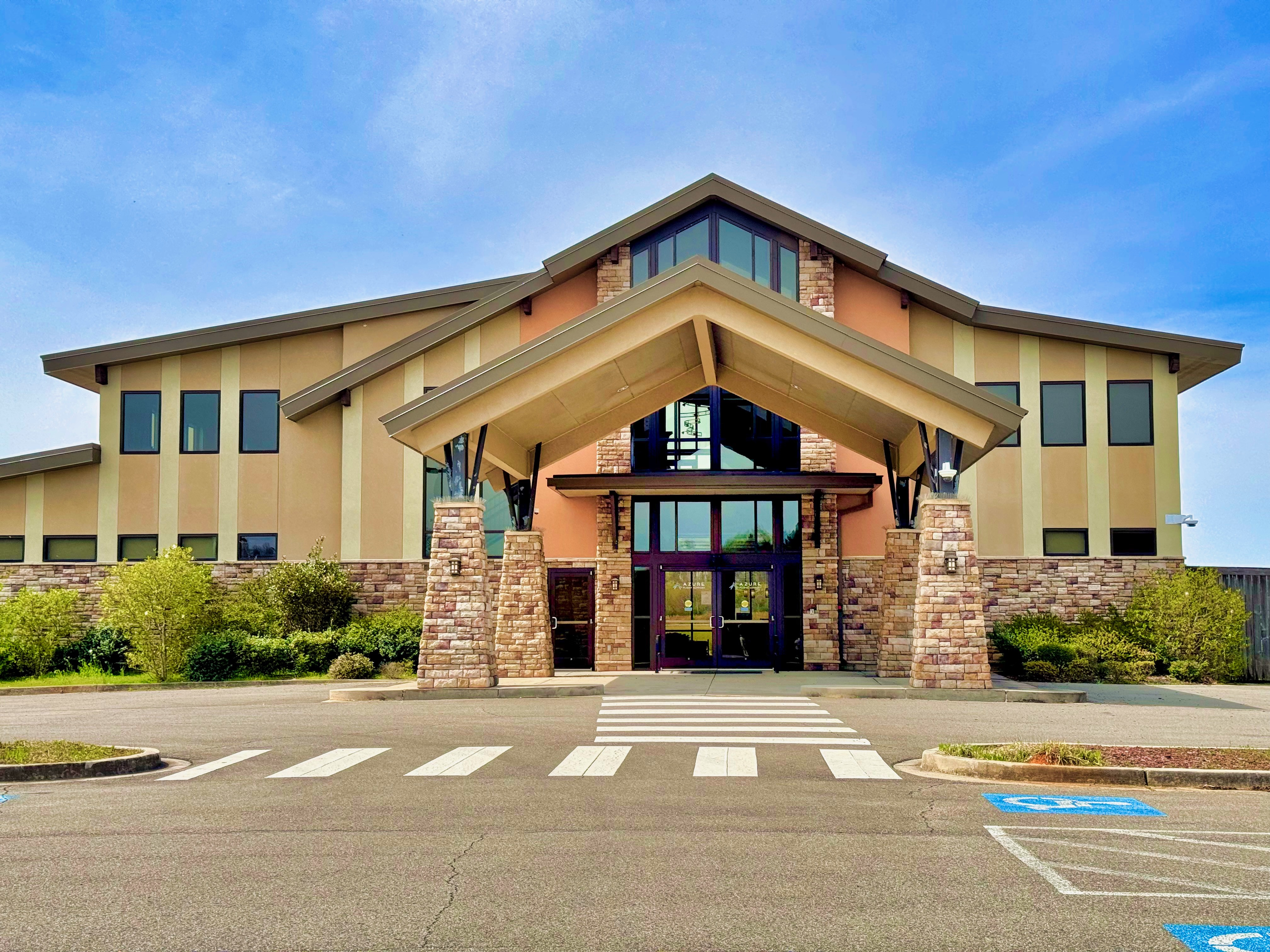
- IATA: none; ICAO: KRZR; FAA LID: RZR

Summary
- Owner: City of Cleveland, Tennessee
- Serves: Cleveland, Tennessee; Bradley County, Tennessee
- Location: 251 Dry Valley Road NE; Cleveland, TN 37312
- Opened: January 25, 2013
- Time zone: Eastern ()
- Elevation AMSL: 262.1 m / 860 ft
- Coordinates: 35°12′41″N 084°47′59″W
- Website: www.clevelandregionaljetport.com

Map
- Location of airport in Tennessee KRZR (the United States)

Runways
Direction	Length		Surface
Direction	m	ft	Surface
3/21	1,890	6,200	Concrete
- Statistics: Cleveland Regional Jetport

Cleveland Regional Jetport is a public general aviation airport located near the community of Tasso, Tennessee, US, approximately four miles north of the business district of Cleveland. Opened on January 25, 2013, it is owned by the City of Cleveland and serves Cleveland and Bradley County.

== Facilities ==
The airport contains a 6,200 foot by 100 foot concrete runway, an 8,000 square foot terminal building, a thirty-five foot wide taxiway, a 311,452 square foot apron, and twenty hangars.

== History ==
=== Background ===
Cleveland Regional Jetport was constructed to replace Hardwick Field, established in 1955 and located about 2 miles (3.2 km) to the west. Hardwick field consisted of a 3,300-foot (1,000 m) asphalt runway. By the early 1970s, many local leaders had come to view Hardwick Field's facilities as inadequate for the community. In 1973, a newly elected city commissioner proposed a new general aviation airport for the city to be constructed at a new site, and later that year, a proposal was unveiled to double the length of the runway to 6,600 feet (2,000 m). Further efforts continued throughout the 1980s. In 1991, then-newly elected mayor of Cleveland Tom Rowland set a goal for a new general aviation airport for the city. A study commissioned by the city in 1994 identified 18 possible sites for a new airport, including the one near the Tasso community. The push for a new airport was further energized in March 2000, when then-governor Don Sundquist flew into Hardwick Field and expressed his opinion that the facility was the "worst airport in the state."

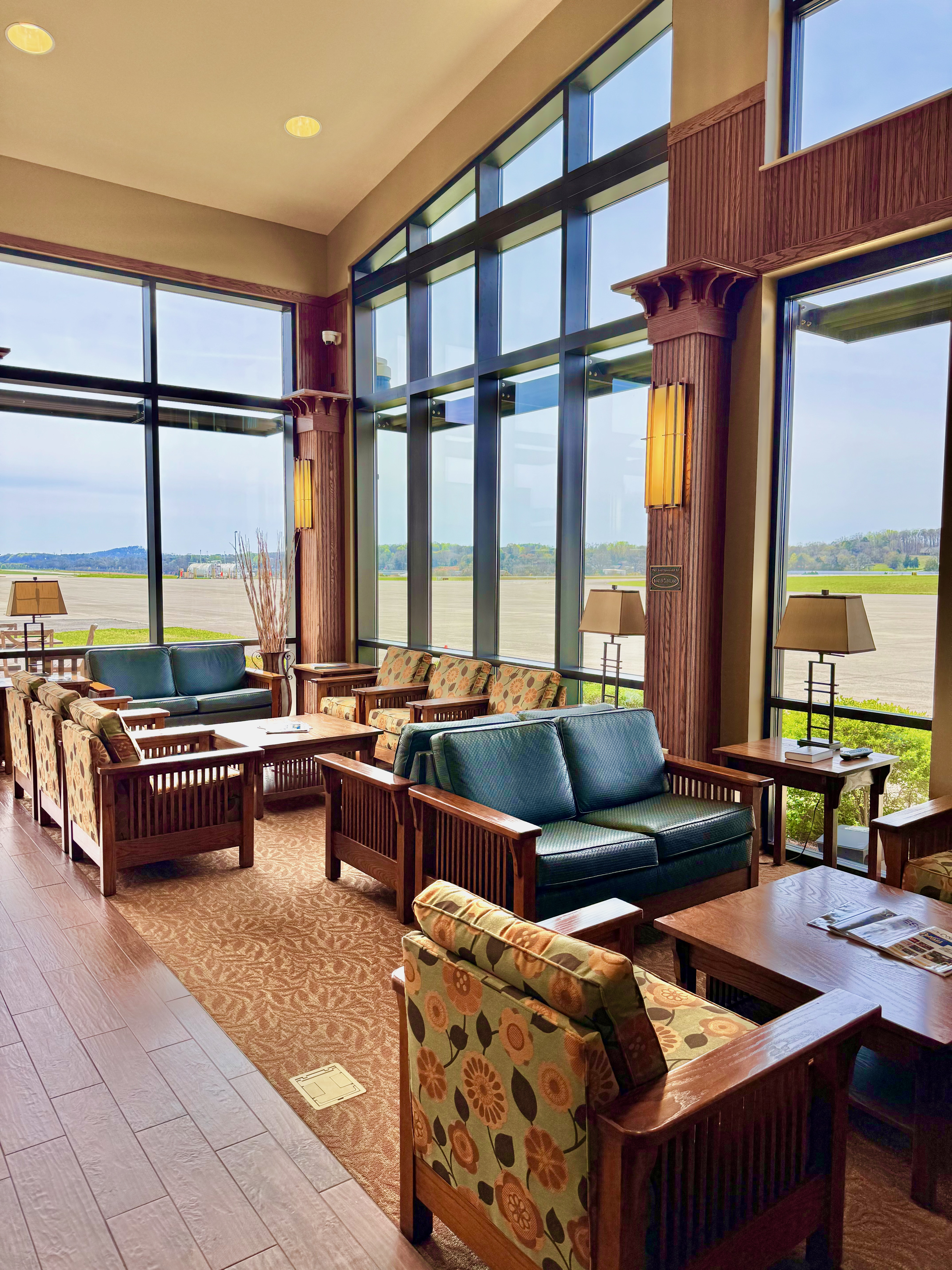
The terminal at Cleveland Regional Jetport

In 2004, the Cleveland City Council authorized the creation of the Cleveland Municipal Airport Authority. On January 28, 2005, several proposals to lengthen and expand the runway at Hardwick Field, which would have required additional purchased land, were presented to the airport authority. At the time, then-chairwoman of the airport authority Lynn Devault expressed doubt that another site would be found for a new airport. Many residents living around the airport expressed opposition to these proposals, and requested that the city pursue and new site instead.

After the proposed expansions of Hardwick Field were ruled unfeasible, the airport authority began reviewing sites from the 1994 study, and settled on the site on Dry Valley Road, then a series of farms. This proposal was also met with opposition, however. The authority, which chose not to acquire land via eminent domain, soon worked a deal with the property owners to sell the land, and on August 21, 2006, the Bradley County Commission voted 10–4 to rezone the property. On April 11, 2007, then-governor Phil Bredesen announced that the state would provide a $4.35 million aeronautics grant for property acquisition and preliminary engineering for an environmental impact statement of the property.

=== Construction ===
Construction of the new airport was split into three phases. The contract for phase one of construction, which including wetland mitigation and preliminary work, was signed on November 20, 2009. The project officially began on April 19, 2010. Phase 2 was awarded on September 20, 2010. This phase involved leveling and excavating 2.2 million cubic yards of dirt onto the site and slightly rerouting and constructing a culvert over a small stream which ran through the site. Construction of the new airport also required the relocation of Tasso Road, which ran through the property. This was accomplished by rerouting the road around the airport, creating a straight stretch nearly 1 mile (1.6 km) long parallel to the runway, which some have come to jokingly nickname the airport's second runway. The name Cleveland Regional Jetport was selected by the airport authority on December 16, 2011. The contract for the final phase of construction, the construction of the runway, was awarded on April 20, 2012. The jetport officially opened on January 25, 2013, with a 5,500 feet (1.7 km) runway. Hardwick Field closed on December 31, 2013.

The entire project cost $42.32 million, with $36.376 coming from the state and federal government, $5.943 from the city, and additional funds coming from private donors, including businessman Allan Jones.

=== Later history ===
The jetport was named Airport of the Year by the Tennessee Aeronautics Commission (TEC) in March 2014.

In 2017 the runway was extended to 6,200 ft.

== See also ==
- List of airports in Tennessee
