= Check Into Cash =

Payday lending company

- Type: Private
- Industry: Financial services
- Founded: 1993
- Founder: W. Allan Jones
- Headquarters: Carrollton, Texas
- Number of locations: 200+ Stores
- Area served: Alabama; Arizona; California; Iowa; Indiana; Kansas; Kentucky; Louisiana; Michigan; Mississippi; Missouri; Oklahoma; South Carolina; Tennessee; Wisconsin
- Key people: Kyle Hanson (Executive Chairman); Bill Baker (President)
- Website: www.checkintocash.com

Check Into Cash is a financial services retailer with more than 200 stores in 15 states. The company was founded in 1993 by W. Allan Jones in Cleveland, Tennessee, and is headquartered in Carrollton, Texas.

Check Into Cash offers payday loans, installment loans, title loans, and lines of credit, dependent upon location, along with bill payment services, check cashing, reloadable prepaid debit cards, Western Union money transfers and money order services, and tax prep services.

== History ==
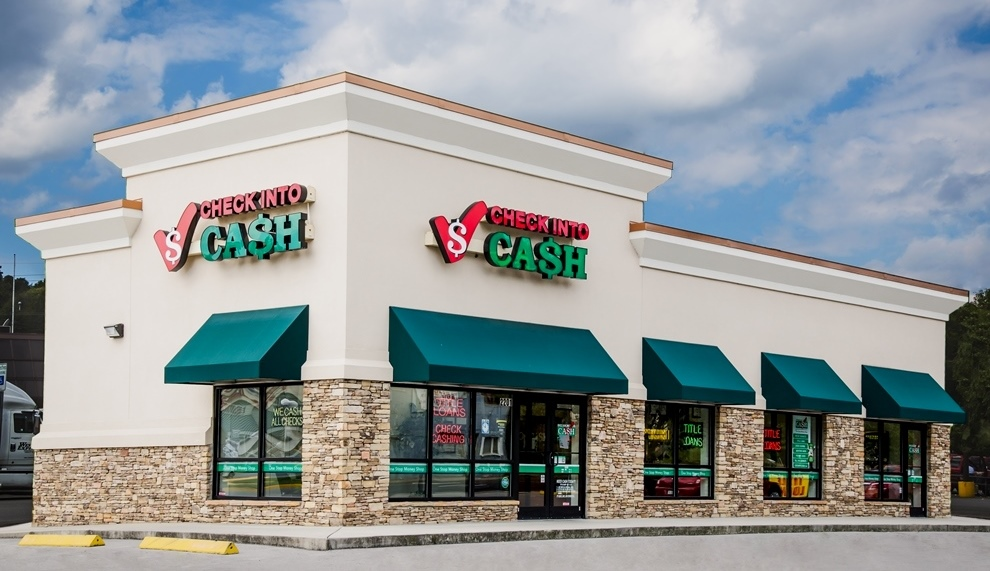
Check Into Cash store

Jones founded Check Into Cash in 1993. He has been referred to as "the father of the payday lending industry" for creating the first national payday lending chain. In 1973, at age 20, he left college, where he had been pursuing a business degree, to help stabilize the family’s business, the Credit Bureau of Cleveland (TN). He purchased the reporting and debt collection business in 1977 and built it into one of the largest credit bureau databases in Tennessee. He sold the credit reporting side of the business to Equifax in 1988, retaining the name and collection agency division. He then built the company to be the largest in the state and sold it in 1998.

Check Into Cash has grown to become one of the largest payday loan companies in the United States.

In 2012, Check Into Cash acquired Cash and Cheque Express, a consumer financial services chain in the United Kingdom. In 2013, they acquired Great American Pawn and Title and Quick loans, both based in Georgia, plus Great American Cash Advance and Nations Quick Cash Title Pawn, which operate in Mississippi, Alabama, and Tennessee. Check Into Cash also acquired Title First Title Pawn, which is based in Georgia.

In 2021, Check Into Cash was acquired by CCF Holdings, LLC or Community Choice Financial Family of Brands.

As of August 2026, CCFI and all its brands became indirect subsidiaries of Katapult Holdings, Inc. along with The Aaron's Company.

The company has been criticized for its exorbitant interest rates.

== Sister Companies ==
Check into Cash was acquired in 2021 by CCF Holdings, LLC (CCFI). Post acquisition, Check Into Cash has multiple sister companies, including TitleMax, Speedy Cash, California Check Cashing Stores, easymoney, and more. CCFI operates more than 1,500 locations across the United States.

== See also ==
- Alternative financial services in the United States
- Payday loans in the United States
