= Paul Huff =

Paul Huff may refer to:

- Paul B. Huff (1918–1994), United States Army soldier and Medal of Honor recipient
- Paul Huff Parkway, a road in Cleveland, Tennessee
