= Cleveland Mall =

Cleveland Mall may refer to:

- The Mall (Cleveland), a public park in Cleveland, Ohio.
- Cleveland Mall (North Carolina), a shopping mall in Shelby, North Carolina.
- Cleveland Mall, a former shopping mall in Cleveland, Tennessee, predecessor of the Bradley Square Mall.
