= Paul Huff Parkway =

Thoroughfare in Cleveland, Tennessee, United States

- Maintained by: City of Cleveland
- Length: 2.42 mi (3.89 km)
- Coordinates: 35°12′39″N 84°51′47″W
- West end: SR 60 in Cleveland
- Major junctions: I-75 in Cleveland
- East end: US 11 (SR 2) in Cleveland

Construction
- Construction start: October 1985
- Completed: October 8, 1988

The C.S.M. Paul B. Huff Medal of Honor Memorial Parkway, more commonly known as Paul Huff Parkway or simply Paul Huff, is a major east–west thoroughfare which runs through northern Cleveland, Tennessee. While not a numbered highway, it serves as a connector between U.S. Route 11 (US 11) and State Route 60 (SR 60) as well as to Interstate 75 (I-75), and is one of the principal arterial roads in the city. The parkway is maintained by the city of Cleveland.

Paul Huff Parkway was originally constructed between 1985 and 1988 to serve as a connector between I-75 and an industrial area in the northeastern part of Cleveland. Since then, its corridor has grown to become the top producer of sales tax revenue in the city. In 2022 the parkway had an annual average daily traffic (AADT) volume of 28,502 vehicles, one of the highest volumes on any road in the area. The road is named in honor of Paul B. Huff, a Cleveland-born U.S. Army soldier and Medal of Honor recipient who served in World War II.

== Route description ==
Paul Huff Parkway is located entirely within the city limits of Cleveland in Bradley County, and is maintained by the City of Cleveland's Public Works Department. It is one of the few locally maintained and non-numbered routes that is part of the National Highway System (NHS), a national network of roads identified as important to the national economy, defense, and mobility. In 2025, traffic volumes on the parkway ranged from 23,222 vehicles per day between Freedom Parkway and a connector road to the Bradley Square Mall, and 14,924 vehicles per day between Candies Creek Ridge Road near the western terminus and Adkisson Drive/Frontage Road.

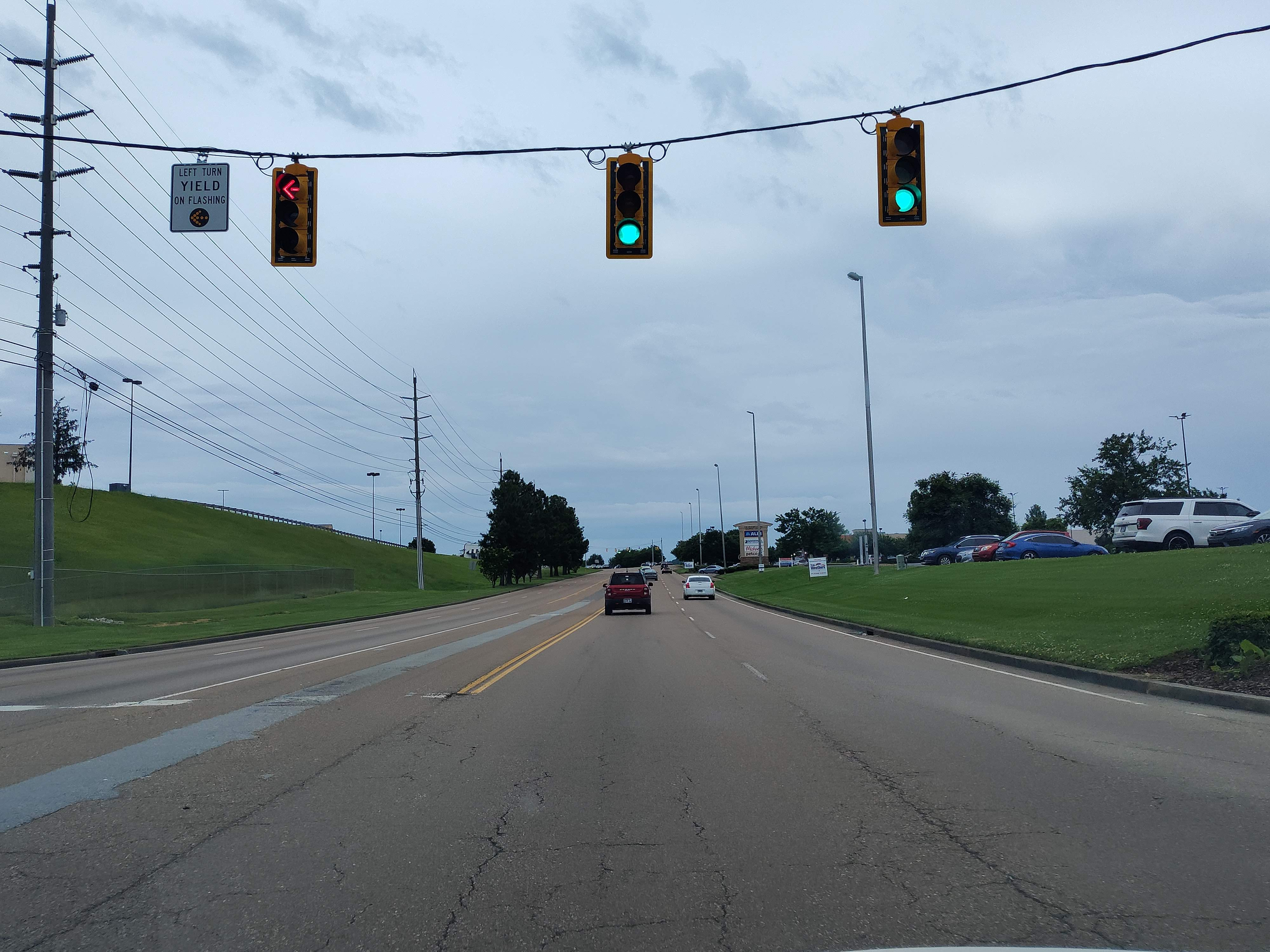
Paul Huff Parkway near the Bradley Square Mall

Paul Huff Parkway begins at an intersection with SR 60 (Georgetown Road) in the northwestern part of the city. An extension of the road exists approximately 1/8 mile (0.20 km) west of the intersection serving commercial properties. It then immediately crosses Candies Creek Ridge as an undivided four-lane road. At the bottom of the ridge it comes to an intersection with Adkisson Drive/Frontage Road, where a center turn lane begins. Adkisson Drive connects to Cleveland State Community College a short distance to the south. About 0.2 miles (0.32 km) later the road comes to an intersection with an interchange with I-75. Afterwards the road enters a large business area, skirting the edge of a few residential neighborhoods, and comes to an intersection with Peerless Road. About 1/4 mile (0.40 km) later it reaches Mouse Creek Road, which serves a number of residential neighborhoods to the north. The road then passes between an elementary school and a shopping center on the opposite side, before coming to an intersection with Freedom Parkway. It then passes a fire and ambulance station and crosses South Mouse Creek (commonly referred to as Mouse Creek) and the Cleveland/Bradley County Greenway. Ascending to the top of a minor ridge, the road intersects two unnamed connector roads that provide access to the Bradley Square Mall to the north and Hickory Grove Shopping Center and other commercial establishments to the south. Approximately 1/4 mile (0.40 km) later the road comes to an intersection with US 11 (SR 2, Keith Street/North Lee Highway) where it ends and continues east as Stuart Road.

== History ==
=== Background and construction ===
U.S. Army Command Sergeant Major Paul B. Huff (1918–1994), the parkway's namesake.

The parkway was first planned as part of a connector road between I-75 and industrial parks in the northeastern part of the city. At the time, most of the land through which it passes was still farmland and woodlands, although residential development had already begun to occur nearby. A project that preceded the parkway was the construction of Stuart Road (originally Industrial Park Road) between US 11 and Old Tasso Road in 1971, and the extension of this road eastward to Michigan Avenue Road. A construction contract was awarded for the extension in December 1982, and the project was completed on June 27, 1984. Many residents in the area were opposed to the parkway's construction, as they felt it would bring unwanted commercial development, which it eventually did. In response, the city and state reached a land use agreement in 1983 that required restrictions on access points on the stretch between I-75 and Mouse Creek Road, but still acknowledged that the areas would eventually be developed. That same year, an activist group composed of local residents was formed to campaign against commercial rezoning along the road. Concerns were also raised about safety at the Mouse Creek Road intersection and the parkway's proximity to an elementary school, which prompted the state to agree to construct a berm separating the school.

The contract for the section between Mouse Creek Road and US 11 was awarded in October 1985, and the contract for the section between Adkisson Drive/Frontage Road and Mouse Creek Road, including the I-75 interchange, was awarded the following month. Most of the latter section replaced part of Valley Head Road, a two-lane road that ran from the Adkisson Drive/Frontage Road intersection, passing under I-75, and ended near what is now the intersection with Peerless Road. The section between Adkisson Drive/Frontage Road and Mouse Creek Road was completed in July 1987, and the section between Mouse Creek Road and US 11 was completed the following month. Construction for the section between SR 60 and Adkisson Drive/Frontage Road began in September 1987 and opened to traffic on October 8, 1988. This project was very laborious, requiring work crews to blast out and move tons of earth and rock from Candies Creek Ridge, and stabilize the sides of the ridge along the road. Not initially planned to take place for many more years, this project's acceleration was made possible by the passage of the Better Roads Program by the Tennessee General Assembly in 1986. While the entire road was constructed by the Tennessee Department of Transportation (TDOT), maintenance was turned over to the city once construction was complete.

The road was initially referred to as the Valley Head connector road. While still under construction, the local Veterans of Foreign Wars post began a push to name the road after Command Sgt. Maj. Paul B. Huff. On October 5, 1987, the Bradley County Commission voted to name the road after Huff, followed by the Cleveland City Commission one week later. The parkway was dedicated in honor of Huff on Veterans Day, November 11, 1988, and signs were installed along the roadside designating it as the C.S.M. Paul B. Huff Medal of Honor Memorial Parkway.

=== Later history ===
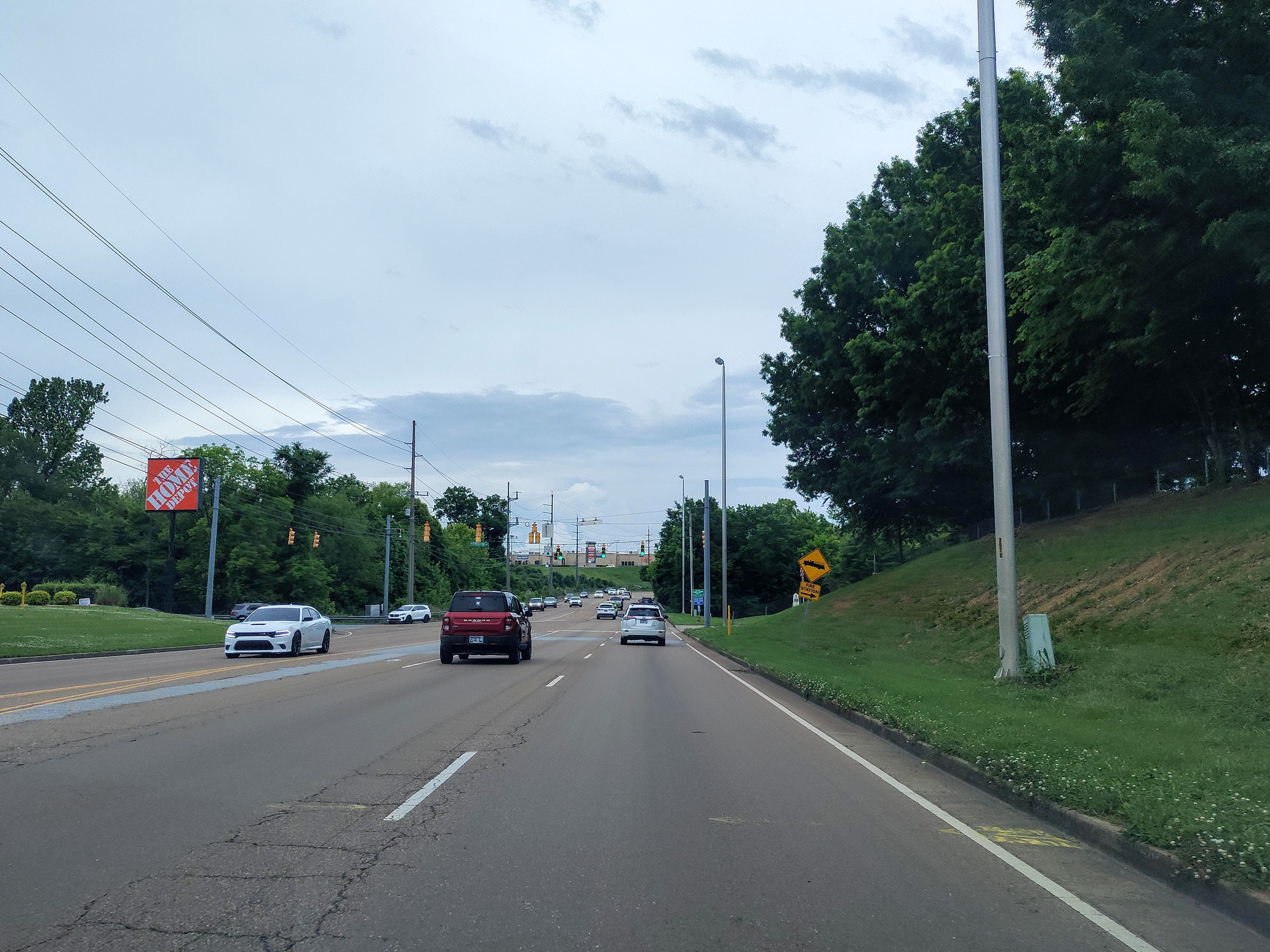
Paul Huff Parkway near the intersection with Mouse Creek Road

In 1991, the Bradley Square Mall opened along the parkway, and much commercial development took place from the late 1990s to the mid-2000s. These included several strip malls including the Hickory Grove Shopping Center as well as such stores as Lowe's and The Home Depot, and several restaurants and hotels. This resulted in a rapid increase in congestion and crashes, prompting some residents to oppose additional developments on the parkway. Development also resulted in the parkway becoming the top source of sales tax revenue in the county. From December 2003 to January 2004, traffic lights were installed at the intersections with the I-75 ramps. An additional signal was installed in July 2004 at the intersection of Freedom Parkway, which was constructed to serve the new Home Depot. In 2015, a short extension of the road was constructed west of SR 60. In December of that year, the first traffic light in Cleveland with a flashing yellow arrow was installed at the intersection between the parkway and SR 60. The speed limit was reduced from 50 to 45 miles per hour (80 to 72 km/h) in early 2016, and that same year, city officials began debating proposed safety improvements to the parkway.

The parkway saw additional growth in commercial development in the early 2010s and from the late 2010s to the early 2020s. These developments resulted in additional traffic congestion and hazards on the parkway, and further criticisms from motorists. By 2018, the crash rate on parts of the parkway was five times greater than that of the area, prompting the city to begin preliminary plans for safety improvements to the corridor. In October 2019, the first blank-out sign in Cleveland, which restricts right turns on red when illuminated, was installed at the intersection of Paul Huff Parkway and Peerless Road. On October 14, 2021, TDOT broke ground on a widening project on the connecting section of SR 60, which included the construction of additional turn lanes at the intersection with the parkway. The project was dedicated and declared substantially finished on July 15, 2025, with final work completed over the following weeks. In early 2022, the city announced that a total of nine improvement projects were planned for the parkway. The first project, which took place from June 2022 to November 2023, expanded the Mouse Creek Road intersection by adding turn lanes to both routes and through lanes to the latter road. The next project, which began in January 2024 and was mostly completed by the end of the year, improved the intersection with the I-75 southbound ramps, including additional turn lanes. This project and the next one, the addition and extension of turn lanes at the Peerless Road intersection, were completed during a resurfacing project of the corridor in May and June 2025. Additional projects will include improvements to the intersection with Frontage Road/Adkisson Drive, and the section between the latter intersection and I-75.

=== Proposed extension ===
A residential construction boom began in the 1990s along Freewill Road, located approximately 3/4 mile (1.2 km) west of the western terminus of Paul Huff Parkway. In response to increased traffic commuting from this area into Cleveland, a concept for extending Paul Huff Parkway to Freewill Road arose. In 2003, a study conducted by TDOT found that the extension would be too expensive for the city to fund on its own. The project again resurfaced in late 2008, when the city listed it in a request for federal funding under a then-proposed federal stimulus package in response to the Great Recession. In early 2011, the Cleveland Area Metropolitan Planning Organization listed the extension as a possible future project pending federal funding. In 2020, the extension received further momentum as additional residential growth occurred in the western part of the city.

== Major intersections ==
The entire route is in Cleveland, Bradley County.

mi	km	Destinations	Notes
0.00	0.00	SR 60 (Georgetown Road)	Continues west to a dead end
0.92	1.48	I-75 – Chattanooga, Knoxville	Diamond interchange; I-75 exit 27
2.42	3.89	US 11 (North Lee Highway/Keith Street/SR 2) / Stuart Road east	Continues east as Stuart Road
1.000 mi = 1.609 km; 1.000 km = 0.621 mi

== See also ==
- APD-40—Highway in Cleveland, Tennessee
- U.S. Route 11 Bypass (Cleveland, Tennessee)
