= Bradley Square Mall =

Shopping mall in Cleveland, Tennessee, United States

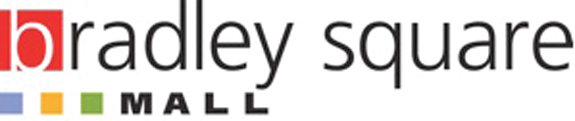
- Location: Cleveland, Tennessee, United States
- Coordinates: 35.20608°N 84.8475°W
- Address: 200 Paul Huff Parkway, NW 37312
- Opened: February 13, 1991
- Developer: Crown American
- Manager: Stacia Crye Shahan
- Owner: Shane Morrison Companies
- Num. of stores: 50
- Num. of anchor tenants: 4 (3 open, 1 vacant)
- Floor area: 511,777 square feet (47,545.6 m^{2})
- Floors: 1
- Parking: 2,201 spaces
- Website: www.shopbradleysquare.com

Bradley Square Mall is a shopping mall located in Cleveland, Tennessee. Opened in 1991, the mall has more than 50 inline tenants. The anchor stores are Belk, AMC Theatres, and Dunham's Sports. There is 1 vacant anchor store that was once JCPenney. The mall is managed by the Shane Morrison Companies based in Baton Rouge, Louisiana.

== History ==
Developed by Crown American, Inc., the mall initially contained anchors Sears, Hess's, Kmart, and J. C. Penney. The mall broke ground in July 1989, and by the fall of 1990, the mall was mostly complete, with Hess's opening in September 1990, and Sear's the next month. The mall opened to the public on February 13, 1991. Kmart opened on March 13, 1991. Hess's became Proffitt's in 1992 and Proffitt's became Belk in 2005. A minor renovation took place in 1999 that included an expansion of Kmart. Since the mall's inception, it has struggled to keep its tenants.

After a planned 12-screen theater project was cancelled in 2008, the mall began to add non-traditional retailers such as a gym, a martial arts studio, a playground, and a church. The Shane Morrison Companies assumed ownership on December 1, 2010.

In May 2012, an 18 million dollar renovation project began. The project included work on the entrances and much of the interior and exterior, and an expansion and renovation of Belk. The project was completed in April 2013.

A 12-screen theater complex at Bradley Square Mall opened in November 2012, according to an announcement issued by Carmike Cinemas. The theater has a notable feature known as a "BIGD" auditorium, which contains a screen sixty feet wide and three stories tall, powered by a Christie digital 3D/2D projector, luxurious theater seating, and 7.1 surround sound. AMC Theatres assumed management of the theater in 2017.

The original Sears store closed and became Dunham's Sports in late 2013. Sears subsequently opened a smaller Hometown store elsewhere in the mall, but has since closed. In January 2016, Sears Holdings announced that Kmart would be closing in mid March.

In October 2016, the mall announced that the former Kmart anchor store would be demolished for additional parking for a planned shopping center at the west end of the mall. There will be seven new major retailers added in a strip mall styled center located at the end of the mall. The two mall entrances located by the former Kmart will also be demolished along with several shops in order to create two new retailers with both mall and exterior entrances as well as a new mall entrance which will have an outdoor walkway to the new retailers in the strip mall named "The Shops at Bradley Square." This demolition took place in October 2018.

The Village Mall, opened in 1961, and the Cleveland Mall, opened in 1974, were smaller shopping malls in the city located downtown and on Keith Street respectively. With the opening of Bradley Square, those shopping centers began losing shoppers, and closed shortly thereafter. The Village Mall became the Village Green Town Center, a strip mall and the corporate headquarters for Check Into Cash and the businesses of W. Allan Jones in 1998, and the Cleveland Mall became the corporate headquarters of the Life Care Centers of America Campbell Center in 1995.

On June 4, 2020, JCPenney announced that it would close by around October 2020 as part of a plan to close 154 stores nationwide.

== Gallery ==
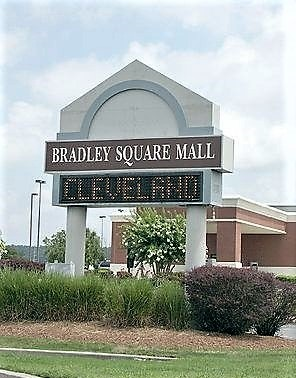
Sign at the entrance in 2007

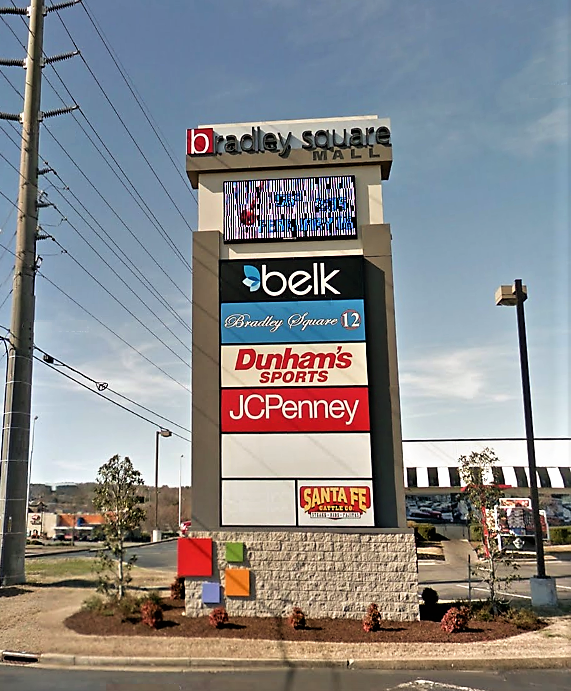
Sign at the entrance in 2017

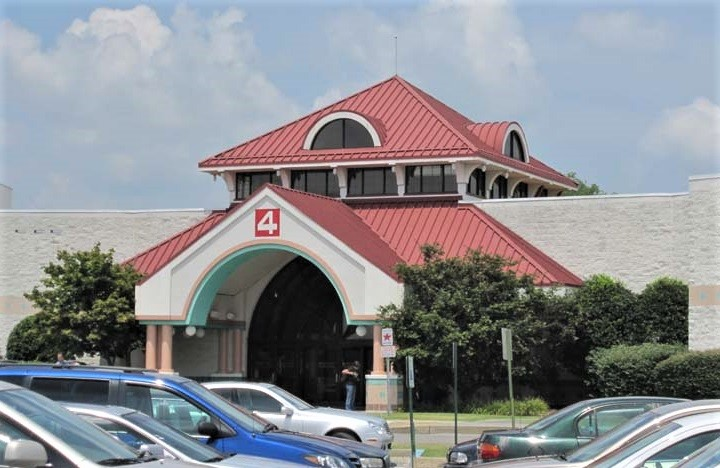
Entrance to the mall from 1991 to 2012

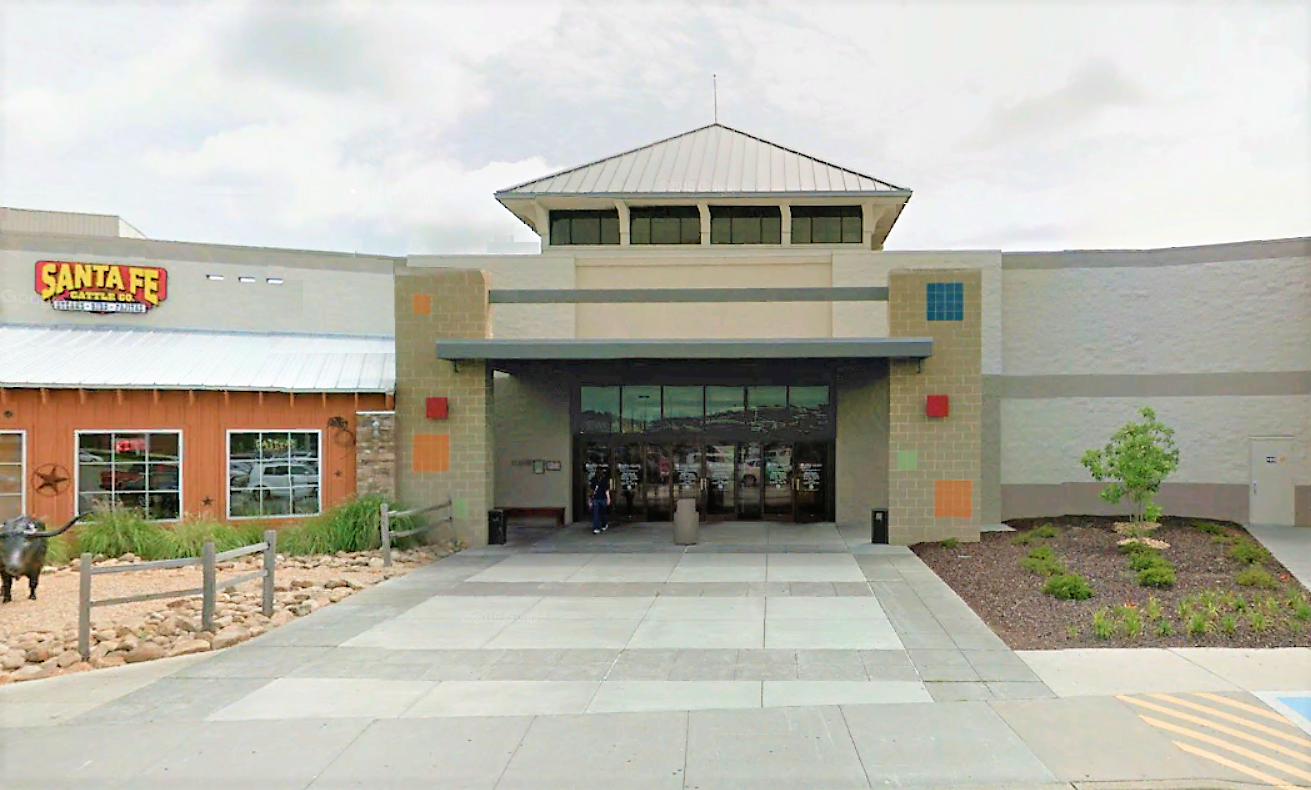
Entrance to the mall from 2012 to the present

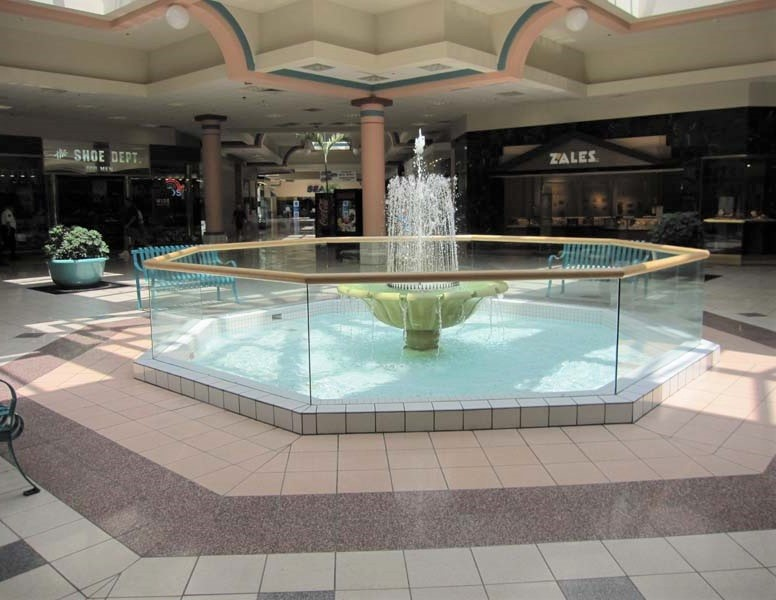
Fountain inside the mall
