= Cleveland/Bradley County Greenway =

Public walking path in Tennessee, U.S.

- Length: 4 miles (6.4 km)
- Location: Cleveland, Tennessee
- Established: 2001
- Trailheads: Willow Street, north of Mohawk Drive
- Use: Walking, bicycling
- Surface: Concrete, Asphalt
- Maintained by: Greenway Advisory Board
- Website: cbcgreenway.com

The Cleveland/Bradley County Greenway is a four-mile (6.4 km)-long public greenway walking path in Cleveland, Tennessee maintained by the local Greenway Advisory Board. The path is the longest path in the Greenway Network, a network of public walking trails located in Bradley County, Tennessee.

== Description ==
The Cleveland/Bradley County Greenway weaves through the northern part of Cleveland from Willow Street to Mohawk Drive. The path follows South Mouse Creek its entire length and crosses the waterway in four locations. Approximately two-thirds of the greenway is concrete and the remainder is asphalt. It has a total of nine access points. The trail begins at a gated intersection with Willow Street, travelling north through a wooded residential area. Approximately 300 yards (270 m) later, it crosses Mouse Creek, and runs parallel just feet from the U.S. Route 11 Bypass (Keith Street). Less than 200 yards (180 m) later the Greenway and Mouse Creek together pass underneath 17th Street, and 20th Street approximately 0.25 miles (0.40 km) later. Approximately 300 yards (270 m) later, the Greenway crosses Mouse Creek again, and enters a wooded area once again. The Greenway passes the international offices of the Church of God and Church of God in Cleveland, Tennessee, and approximately 0.4 miles (0.64 km) later, the greenway and Mouse Creek pass underneath State Route 60 (25th Street). The greenway makes a slight curve to the northeast, and passes through a commercial and residential area, before crossing Mouse Creek again and passing underneath Keith Street about 50 yards (46 m) later. The greenway then passes an area that has come to be known as Greenway Park, which contains a playground, pavilion, stage, and kiosk, and about 250 yards (230 m) later passes underneath Raider Drive. The greenway passes alongside Cleveland High School, and about 300 yards (270 m) later crosses Mouse Creek again. The greenway enters a wooded area, and about 0.6 miles (0.97 km) later enters Tinsley Park, and turns sharp to the northeast. About 0.25 miles (0.40 km) mile later, the greenway turns sharp north again and crosses Mouse Creek. It then passes under Mouse Creek Road, and turns northwest, entering a wooded area near commercial and industrial development. The greenway then makes a slight turn to the northeast and about 0.4 miles (0.64 km) later passes underneath Paul Huff Parkway. The greenway makes another slight turn to the northeast, and passes under Mohawk Drive approximately 0.25 miles (0.40 km) mile later. The greenway then enters a wooded residential area and comes to an intersection with a connector to a neighborhood, before turning northeast and reaching its northern terminus a little over 100 yards (91 m) later at a dead end.

Phase	Length	Location
Phase 1	0.57 miles (0.92 km)	25th to 20th Street
Phase 2	0.8 miles (1.3 km)	Raider Drive to 25th Street
Phase 3	0.51 miles (0.82 km)	20th to Willow Street
Phase 4	0.75 miles (1.21 km)	Mohawk Drive to Tinsley Park
Phase 5	1.17 miles (1.88 km)	Tinsley Park to Raider Drive
Phase 6 (under construction)	0.44 miles (0.71 km)	Willow Street to Inman Street

== Leadership and governing ==
The Greenway is operated by the Greenway Advisory Board, composed of city and county leaders, some of whom are appointed by the Bradley County Commission, Cleveland City Council, Cleveland/Bradley Chamber of Commerce, and Cleveland Utilities. The current chairman is Cameron Fisher. The Advisory Board oversees two subcommittees. Friends of the Greenway is a group that works to promote the Greenway through events and activities. The Greenway Public Arts Committee (GPAC) is a volunteer group that works to provide opportunities for cultural and artistic expressions on the greenway with the intent of enhancing outdoor experiences through public art.

== History ==
=== Construction ===
The Greenway began as a vision of a few citizens intent on improving the quality of life in the community. Between 1998 and 2001, grants and land donations were accepted from several local businesses to fund the construction. The first phase was completed in October 2001. This was the only section of the greenway open for several years. Phase two was built in 2005, opening on August 3 of that year. An approximately 1/4 mile section of phase four, located between Paul Huff Parkway and Mohawk Drive, was built in 2006, while at the same time, work began on the southern part. Phase three was built between August 8, 2007 and May 15, 2008, funded in part through a Tennessee Department of Transportation (TDOT) enhancement grant. Construction on the next part of phase four began in September 2008, and the first section, to between Paul Huff Parkway and Mouse Creek Road, was completed in February 2009, funded in part by a grant from the Tennessee Department of Environment and Conservation (TDEC). Work on the next part of phase four began in July 2009, and the entirety of phase four was completed on December 14, 2010. Construction began on the final planned section, phase five, on June 15, 2011. This segment was completed in May 2012, and dedicated on September 24, 2012, eleven years after the beginning of the first section. This was partly funded through multiple state grants, and part of this section takes the place of a pre-existing trail in Tinsley Park.

=== Expansions ===
An extension was built from the north end in the summer of 2013 to connect to a nearby neighborhood. In 2016, the first part of Phase 6, a project to extend the trail to the Village Green Town Center, a business and retail shopping center, began. The first approximately 0.2 miles (0.32 km) were completed that year, but as of 2019 the rest of this project is incomplete and not under construction.

In June 2017, a project to construct an approximately 0.8 miles (1.3 km) long connector from Tinsley Park to U.S. Route 11 (North Ocoee Street) began. It was completed on July 31, 2018, and named the Casteel Connector in honor of a former city manager of Cleveland who pushed for its construction. This project had been in the works since 2012, and was funded partly through a grant from TDOT.

Future plans include expanding the trail to the Hiwassee River in Charleston.

=== Other developments ===
The first historical marker, which is about Col. Benjamin Cleveland, Cleveland's namesake, was installed in June 2011. Two additional markers, which discuss Cleveland's history and the history of education in the area, were installed in January 2016.

The park located between Raider Drive and Keith Street was officially named Greenway Park in January 2015, and is maintained separately by the Cleveland Parks and Recreation Department. A stage was completed in the park in June of that year.

In July 2015 the Cleveland City Council passed an ordinance to ban juveniles from the greenway between 11 PM and 6 AM unless accompanied by an adult and to install security cameras. This was a response to continued acts of vandalism on the greenway.
