= Yellow trap =

Traffic scenario

The yellow trap is a type of road traffic situation that may arise at certain signalized intersections, involving straight-moving traffic conflicting with turning, crossing traffic, which has made an erroneous assumption that the conflict has been resolved, based on their received traffic signal.

The name yellow trap originates from the fact that drivers who receive a yellow (also known as amber) permissive turn signal may erroneously believe that the conflicting, straight-moving traffic has also received a yellow cue, when in fact, the straight-moving signal is still green.

It can present a potentially dangerous scenario relating to turns at a traffic-light–controlled intersection across oncoming traffic without a protective turn signal; for right-hand traffic, this refers to a vehicle attempting to make a left turn without a permissive/protective left-turn signal.

The yellow trap occurs when the timing of the amber lights (also known as "yellow" lights in the USA) is asymmetric for two-way traffic on a single road: when a vehicle is waiting to turn across oncoming traffic and receives an amber light from the traffic signal, the driver may assume that oncoming traffic also has received an amber light and proceeds with the turn, believing that oncoming traffic will yield the right-of-way on an assumed amber. If oncoming traffic has an extended green light instead, this could lead to a crash.

== Sequence ==
Illustration of the yellow trap at an intersection	Top: The driver of the red car is stopped at the intersection, waiting to turn left against oncoming traffic once the blue car passes. The turn against oncoming traffic is not protected, i.e., there is no separate signal for the turn.
Illustration of the yellow trap at an intersection	Middle: The driver of the red car has received an amber light signal and mistakenly assumes that oncoming traffic also has received an amber light signal and will yield. The driver of the red car proceeds to turn against oncoming traffic (in this case, a left turn).
Illustration of the yellow trap at an intersection	Bottom: The blue car, which still has the right-of-way due to the green light, crashes into the red car. The red car's driver should have yielded the right-of-way but mistakenly assumed the blue car also had received an amber, then red light and would yield.

When a vehicle traveling on a road with two-way traffic is preparing to turn at an intersection and the intersection does not have a protected turn across oncoming traffic, the yellow trap may occur when the vehicle preparing to turn is given an amber light, while at the same time, traffic on the same road moving in the opposite direction still has a green light. The driver who is intending to turn, facing the amber (then red) light, could assume that the traffic going in the opposite direction on the same road also has an amber or red light, and that oncoming traffic will stop or yield the right-of-way. This could potentially lead to a crash if the turning driver attempts to proceed with the turn across traffic, assuming mistakenly they can take the right-of-way, but it is not safe to do so. The turning driver may legally be at fault for failure to yield, but the understandable mistake stems from the reasonable assumption that both lights were turning amber simultaneously.

The Manual on Uniform Traffic Control Devices (MUTCD) allows this asymmetric light timing only if the intersection has signs posted stating that Oncoming Traffic Has Extended Green or Oncoming Traffic May Have Extended Green. However, many agencies in North America routinely allow the yellow trap, especially during emergency vehicle preemption, despite clear prohibition from the MUTCD. Some of this stems from difficulties programming older traffic signal control software to prevent the yellow trap, but much stems from traffic engineers or technicians not understanding the yellow trap hazard, or believing it is not a serious problem.

In left-hand traffic, the same scenario is applicable for drivers turning right.

=== Solutions ===
Protected-permissive traffic signals in the United States: (1) "Classic" doghouse signal, in use since 1971 (2) 4-light signal with flashing yellow arrow (most common shape for FYA) (3) Doghouse-style signal face with flashing yellow arrow

Solutions to the yellow trap include the flashing amber arrow, Dallas phasing, Arlington phasing, simultaneously ending both through movements (circular green lights change to amber, then red) before serving both left-turn movements (green arrows), or prohibiting one of the two left-turn movements.

The situation can be eliminated by using nearside traffic signals, which are only visible to drivers at the stop line. This way, drivers in the intersection only focus on the oncoming traffic, and aren't pressured to make their turn when the light changes. This is the practice in most European countries, especially the UK, where it's known as a "closely-associated signal".
