= Village Green Town Center =

Shopping mall in Cleveland, Tennessee, US

Coordinates: 35.1608°N 84.8824°W

Village Green Town Center is a partially open-air shopping mall located in Cleveland, Tennessee. The mall originally opened in 1960 as The Village Shopping Center, with tenants such as Parks-Belk, S.S. Kresge’s, Zales Jewelers, and a bowling alley. The mall was developed by Jimmy Corn and his father Col. James F. Corn as Cleveland’s first major shopping center. In August 1998, the mall was purchased by local businessman Allan Jones for $2.7 million, who opened the national headquarters of his financial services company Check into Cash in the mall.
