= Paul B. Huff =

US Army Medal of Honor recipient (1918–1994)

- Paul Bert Huff
- Born: June 23, 1918; Cleveland, Tennessee, US
- Died: September 21, 1994 (aged 76); Cleveland, Tennessee
- Burial place: Hillcrest Memorial Gardens, Cleveland, Tennessee
- Military career
- Allegiance: United States
- Branch: United States Army
- Rank: Command Sergeant Major
- Units: 509th Parachute Infantry Battalion, 101st Airborne Division
- Conflicts: World War II; Vietnam War
- Awards: Medal of Honor; Legion of Merit (2); Bronze Star Medal (2); Air Medal (2)

Paul Bert Huff (June 23, 1918 – September 21, 1994) was a United States Army soldier and a recipient of the United States military's highest decoration—the Medal of Honor—for his actions in World War II.

== Early life and military career ==
Huff was born on June 23, 1918, in Cleveland, Tennessee where he was one of nine children. At the age of five, Huff's mother died. Huff completed only one year of high school. At some point in his early years, Huff earned the nickname "Killer" allegedly for his ability to hunt squirrels.

After he joined the Army in 1941, Huff volunteered to be a paratrooper and on November 8, 1942, he became part of the Army's first combat parachute insertion into North Africa during Operation Torch. Later, in 1944, Huff was part of the amphibious landing in Italy that began the Battle of Anzio.

On February 8, 1944, while serving as a corporal in the 509th Parachute Infantry Battalion, Huff and his platoon were staked out on the Anzio beachhead when Germans attacked his company with artillery. Huff volunteered to lead a reconnaissance patrol to determine the enemy's exact location. During the patrol, Huff and his men were shot at by machine gun fire and mortars. Not wanting to jeopardize his men, he moved forward alone, traversed a minefield under fire, and eventually killed a machine gun crew and destroyed their weapons. Having gained information on the enemy's location, Huff made his way back to his soldiers and then led them to safety. Armed with the information gathered by Huff, an Army patrol subsequently killed 27 Germans and captured 21 others. For his bravery under fire, Huff was nominated for the Medal of Honor, which was awarded to him on June 8, 1944, by Lieutenant General Mark W. Clark during a ceremony in Rome. Huff was the first paratrooper to be awarded the Medal of Honor.

Once Huff returned home, he went on a nationwide tour as part of an Army aerial show, making several parachute jumps to help raise money for war bonds.

After the war ended, Huff remained in the Army, eventually reaching the highest enlisted rank, command sergeant major. Huff's last assignment was command sergeant major of 101st Airborne Division's 1st Brigade in Vietnam.

== Medal of Honor citation ==
Corporal Huff's official Medal of Honor citation reads:

For conspicuous gallantry and intrepidity at risk of life above and beyond the call of duty, in action on 8 February 1944, near Carano, Italy. Cpl. Huff volunteered to lead a 6-man patrol with the mission of determining the location and strength of an enemy unit which was delivering fire on the exposed right flank of his company. The terrain over which he had to travel consisted of exposed, rolling ground, affording the enemy excellent visibility. As the patrol advanced, its members were subjected to small arms and machinegun fire and a concentration of mortar fire, shells bursting within 5 to 10 yards of them and bullets striking the ground at their feet. Moving ahead of his patrol, Cpl. Huff drew fire from 3 enemy machineguns and a 20mm weapon. Realizing the danger confronting his patrol, he advanced alone under deadly fire through a minefield and arrived at a point within 75 yards of the nearest machinegun position. Under direct fire from the rear machinegun, he crawled the remaining 75 yards to the closest emplacement, killed the crew with his submachine gun and destroyed the gun. During this act he fired from a kneeling position which drew fire from other positions, enabling him to estimate correctly the strength and location of the enemy. Still under concentrated fire, he returned to his patrol and led his men to safety. As a result of the information he gained, a patrol in strength sent out that afternoon, 1 group under the leadership of Cpl. Huff, succeeded in routing an enemy company of 125 men, killing 27 Germans, and capturing 21 others, with a loss of only 3 patrol members. Cpl. Huff's intrepid leadership and daring combat skill reflect the finest traditions of the American infantryman.

== Death and legacy ==
Paul Huff died at age 76 and was buried in Hilcrest Memorial Gardens in his hometown of Cleveland, Tennessee. He was survived by his wife, Betty Cunnyngham Huff.

Paul Huff Parkway, a major thoroughfare in Cleveland, Tennessee, is named in his honor, as is the Paul B. Huff Army Reserve Center, located in Nashville.

== Awards and decorations ==

Badge	Combat Infantryman Badge		
1st row	Medal of Honor		Legion of Merit with 1 Oak leaf cluster
2nd row	Bronze Star Medal with 1 Oak leaf cluster	Air Medal with 1 Oak leaf cluster	Army Commendation Medal
3rd row	Army Good Conduct Medal with 6 Good Conduct Loops	American Defense Service Medal	American Campaign Medal
4th row	European–African–Middle Eastern Campaign Medal with Arrowhead Device and 4 Campaign stars	World War II Victory Medal	National Defense Service Medal with 1 Oak leaf cluster
5th row	Vietnam Service Medal with 2 Campaign stars	Republic of Vietnam Gallantry Cross with Gold Star	Vietnam Campaign Medal
Badge	Master Parachutists Badge with 3 Combat Jump Stars		
Unit awards	Presidential Unit Citation		Republic of Vietnam Unit Gallantry Cross with palm

== See also ==
- List of Medal of Honor recipients for World War II
