= Variations in traffic light operation =

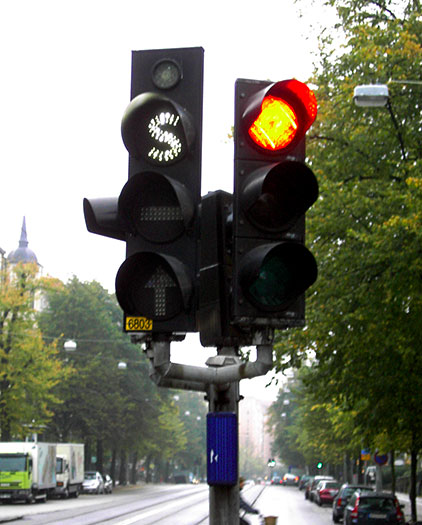
Swedish traffic light (left) for use by public transport vehicles only. All signals use white lighting and special symbols ("S", "–" and an arrow) to distinguish them from regular signals. The small light at the top tells the driver when the vehicle's transponder signal is received by the traffic light.

In traffic engineering, there are regional and national variations in traffic light operation. This may be in the standard traffic light sequence (such as the inclusion of a red–amber phase) or by the use of special signals (such as flashing amber or public transport signals).

== Flashing signals ==
=== Flashing red ===
UK sign indicating a pair of flashing red light signals

In the United States and Canada, a flashing red light is the equivalent of a stop sign.

In New Zealand, Hong Kong, and the United Kingdom, paired red/red traffic lights are often installed outside fire and ambulance stations on major roads, which, when activated by the station, flash alternately (so that at any time one red light is showing), the purpose being to cause traffic to stop for a set amount of time to allow emergency vehicles to exit their station safely. The UK also uses an amber light which precedes the flashing red lights, and these signals are also used at level crossings, airfields and lifting or swing bridges (but not at the most well-known, London's Tower Bridge, which uses ordinary red traffic lights). At some fire and ambulance stations in the UK, flashing blue lights in place of the red lights are also used to let the driver of the emergency vehicle know that the flashing red lights on the road are working and is safe to exit the station.

=== Flashing amber/yellow ===
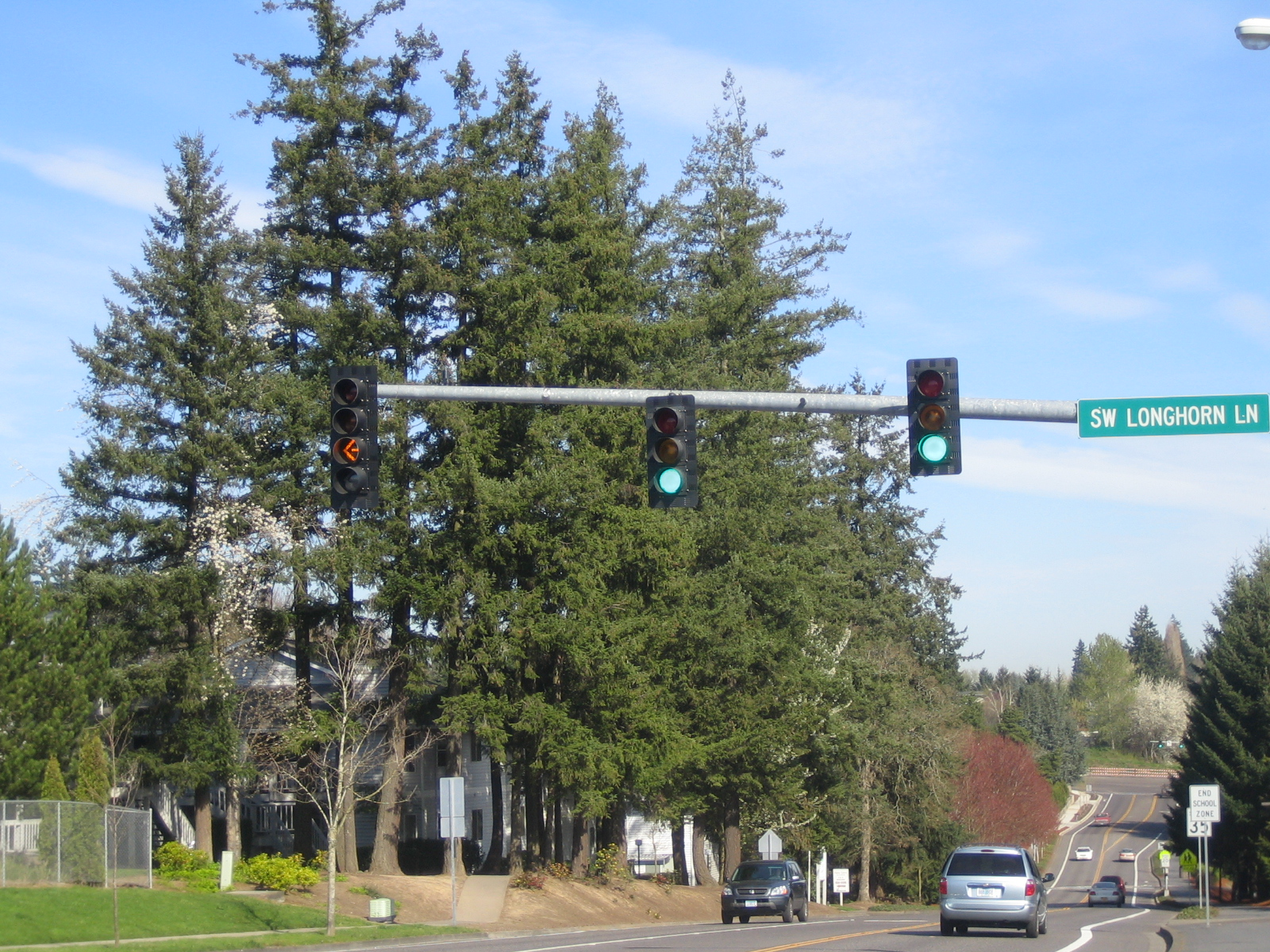
A pole-mounted four-light signal with flashing yellow arrow for a left turn in Oregon

In the US, Canada, Brazil, Australia, and The Netherlands, flashing yellow does not require traffic to stop, but drivers should exercise caution since opposing traffic may enter the intersection after stopping. This may be used when there is a malfunction with the signals, or late at night when there is little traffic. A single four-way flashing light showing only one color in each direction may be used at intersections where full three-color operation is not needed, but stop or yield signs alone have not had acceptable safety performance. Yellow lights are displayed to the main road, to highlight the intersection and inform drivers of the need for caution. Red lights supplement stop signs on the side road approaches. All-way red flashing lights can supplement all-way stop control, but all-way yellow signals are prohibited by US regulations. In Canada a flashing yellow light at an intersection that would otherwise have traffic signals indicates that the traffic signals are malfunctioning. In this case the flashing yellow is seen by all vehicles approaching the intersection, and indicates that all vehicles must treat the intersection as a four way stop. All vehicles must come to a complete stop and yield right of way as per four way stop procedure. This would continue until the traffic signals have been fixed.

In the UK and Ireland, flashing amber lights are used at pelican crossings to indicate that drivers should give way to pedestrians if they are still on the crossing, which replaces the normal red and amber phase used at other traffic signals. However in recent years in the UK, most pelican crossings are gradually being phased out in favour of puffin crossings or Pedex Crossings, as the flashing phase on pelican crossings has been deemed to be confusing to pedestrians and drivers alike. Also in the UK, twin flashing amber lights are used at cattle crossings and army tank crossings to warn drivers that they should give way at the crossing when the lights flash.

==== Flashing yellow arrow ====
Variations on the protected/permissive traffic signals in the United States; (1) is the "classic" doghouse five-light signal introduced in 1971; (2) and (3) incorporate flashing yellow arrows.

In the US, a flashing yellow arrow is a signal phasing configuration for permissive left turns. An additional aspect displaying a yellow arrow is inserted between the yellow left turn arrow and the green left turn arrow. When the phase is active, the yellow arrow will flash. Drivers turning left or making a U-turn must be cautious and yield to both oncoming vehicles and pedestrians. The US MUTCD includes this meaning of the flashing yellow arrow, but though in 2008, the state had planned to require all new signals to have flashing yellow arrows, the 2011 Maryland MUTCD prohibits the flashing yellow arrow in favor of a flashing red arrow.

Tucson, Arizona uses a doghouse signal, with bimodal arrow (green and flashing yellow arrow) and a yellow arrow on the left and green and yellow balls on the right, topped by a red ball. During the permissive turn, the green ball and flashing yellow arrow are displayed. This can also prevent yellow trap, which occurs when the circular signal turns yellow, and then red, while oncoming traffic still has a circular green. The MUTCD allows this signal with a special red light that can change into a ball, arrow, or a cross on intersections with lanes that are all reversible by lane control.

Sparks, Nevada uses a similar arrangement: it uses a doghouse signal with green and yellow arrows (Steady or Flashing) on the left and green and yellow balls on the right, topped by a red ball, During the permissive turn, the flashing yellow arrow is displayed; but it could not prevent yellow trap because it is phased wrongly.

A standard sign in the Ohio Manual of Uniform Traffic Control Devices explains the flashing yellow arrow configuration.

The benefit of its introduction is that traffic engineers have a wider range of options to handle variable traffic volumes. According to the Minnesota Department for Transport, the flashing yellow arrow reduces delays and enhances safety. A research report from the National Cooperative Highway Research Program in the US found that it improves safety compared with a standard circular green signal. The flashing yellow arrow has an important safety advantage because it can be shown while the through signals on the same approach are red. The flashing yellow arrow is also meant to prevent yellow trap. Though Dallas phasing resolved the yellow trap issue, flashing yellow arrow has been deemed less confusing than a louvered green ball, and problems might arise if the left turn signal comes out of adjustment and its indications are visible to through traffic.

In the United States, the flashing yellow arrow is not allowed where left turns and other traffic share the same lane. The circular green is still allowed as a permissive left-turn display, but has new restrictions:

- It may not be placed over or in front of the left turn lane in new installations.
- Any yellow trap caused by a circular green must be eliminated or warned with a sign.
- If one lane is shared by left turning and straight ahead traffic, the left turn movement (protected or permissive) and the straight ahead movement must begin together and must end together at the same time in the signal cycle. In this case, a green left turn arrow may not be shown with a circular red, and a red left turn arrow may not be shown with a circular green or a straight ahead green arrow.

=== Flashing green ===
In Canada, there is disagreement between the provinces over the meaning of flashing green ball signals. Across most of Canada, such as Ontario, Quebec, New Brunswick, Nova Scotia, the Northwest Territories, and Nunavut (traffic lights in Nunavut are only temporary and not permanent), flashing green means an Advanced Green. This means traffic can turn left (across oncoming traffic) without needing to yield. The advanced green was originally chosen to be represented by flashing green because at the time of its introduction, in Ontario, a green arrow had meant that all traffic must turn in the direction of the arrow, although this is no longer the case. Additionally, an advanced green could be more easily added to existing three-lamp signals than could display a green arrow, since it did not require physically installing a fourth lamp for the arrow.

British Columbia has adopted a non-standard meaning for a flashing green light, using it to indicate that the signal is controlled by pedestrians (and occasionally bikes). These signals are placed either at intersections or mid-block to allow pedestrians and cyclists to cross a major road. Traffic lights are only installed facing the major road approaches, and if there is a minor road it is controlled by stop signs. The signal will flash green until a pedestrian or cyclist is detected. The green light typically changes to a solid green indication for a few seconds before changing to yellow and then red but the solid green phase may be omitted depending on the road authority that installed the traffic light. The intention of the flashing green is to let drivers know that the signal will only change to yellow for pedestrians but otherwise "rests" in green.

The US 2009 MUTCD specifically prohibits flashing any green signal indication. Protected flashing green is used in parts of California as part of traffic signal preemption for emergency vehicles. This does not conform to MUTCD. Flashing any green signal indication is also against the Vienna Convention on Road Signs and Signals. In Austria, Croatia and Estonia a flashing green light gives advance notice of a change to amber. However, this breaches the Vienna Convention.

== Steady signals ==
=== Steady green arrows ===
Throughout most of the United States a protected turn (a turn that can be made without conflicting traffic) is indicated by a steady 12-inch-diameter (300 mm) green arrow pointing in the direction of the turn. This indication may be displayed in a separate traffic signal head or may be in combination with other arrows or a green ball indication on the same signal such as with the Dallas Phasing configuration described below. Modern signal standards require that a yellow "clearance" interval be displayed for not less than three seconds prior to the protected turn interval ending.

In Mexico, on four section thru left (or five if double red), when the left turn phase is initiated, the green arrow will come on, steady, after the turn phase terminates, the green arrow will start flashing for few seconds before it turns off, just like the yellow arrows on three section left turn signals

Throughout Canada, as in the United States, a green arrow indicates protected movement in the direction of the arrow. In British Columbia (permissive only), Alberta, Saskatchewan, Manitoba, Kingston, Ontario, and Quebec, green turn arrows may or may not flash; both cases indicate a protected turn phase, but a flashing green arrow indicates that the protected phase will be followed by a permissive phase.

In Regina, Saskatchewan, left-turn signals are designated by a two-bulb light configuration with one (or two) red balls and one LED bimodal arrow. When a left-turn cycle begins the red ball will change to a flashing green arrow to permitted all traffic turning left. When the left-turn cycle ends the flashing green arrow will turn to a solid amber arrow for five to three seconds then change back to a red ball.

In the UK and many European countries, a green arrow may replace the full green light to indicate the direction in which movement is permitted for traffic in that lane. They may also have an additional green arrow below or on the left or the right of the other green arrow to permit drivers in that lane also to turn in that direction.

==== Hold-the-left and hold-the-right arrangements ====
In New Zealand, where traffic is on the left, when a road is given a green light from an all-direction stop, a red arrow can continue to display to turning traffic, holding traffic back while a pedestrian crossing on the side road is given a green signal (for left turns) or while oncoming traffic goes straight ahead and there is no permissive right turn allowed (for right turns). As soon as the pedestrian signal changes to flashing red, the red arrow for road traffic is extinguished. Traffic turning may then proceed provided they give way to oncoming traffic (for right turns) or pedestrians (for left turns). This method is becoming common in many states of Australia. When an intersection is given a protected turn prior to the pedestrian crossing on the side road being given a green signal, the lights change to yellow and red, and then the red arrow disappears as soon as the pedestrian crossing is given a flashing red signal.

==== Filter arrow ====
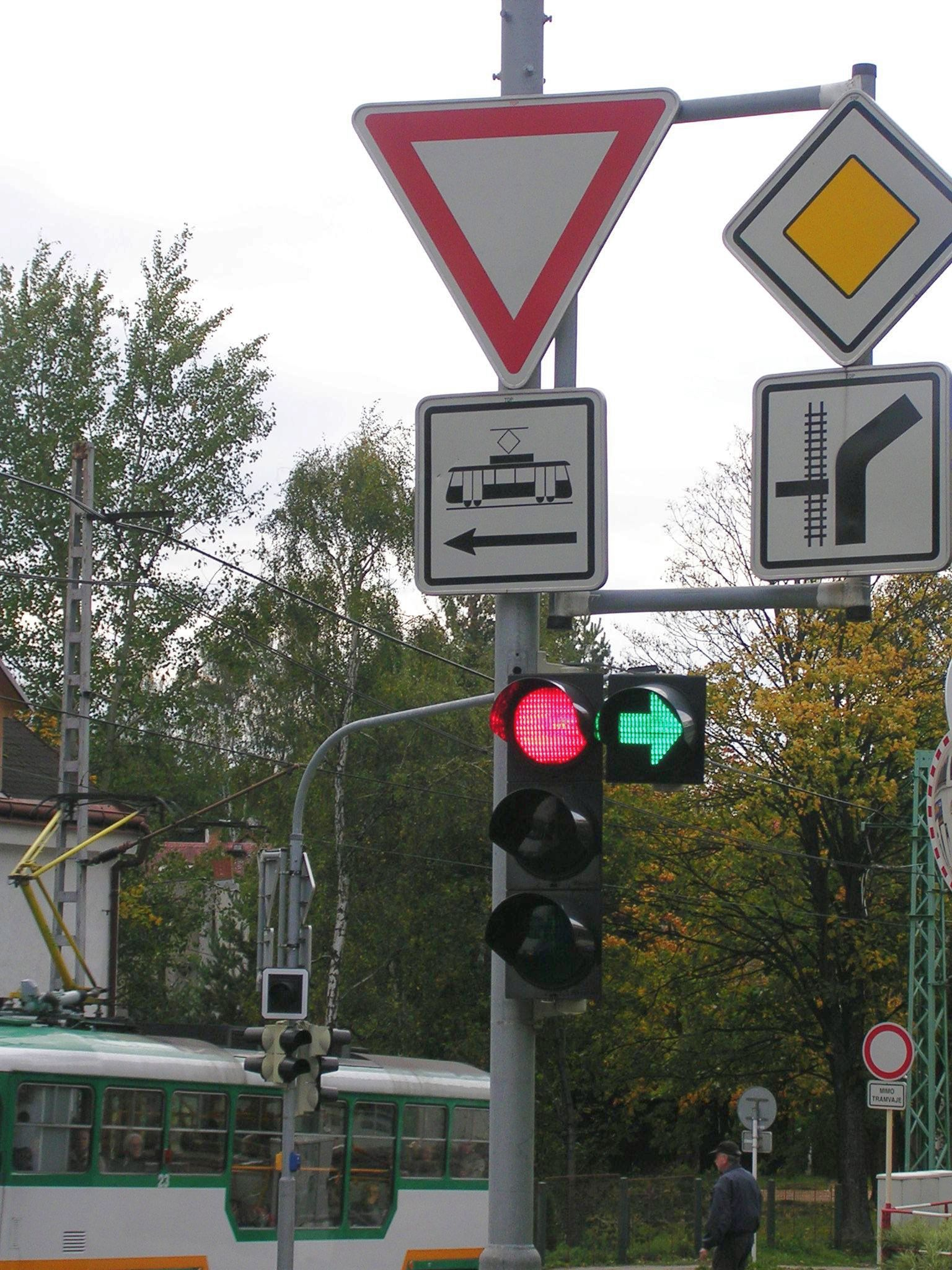
Right turn filter arrow in Liberec, Czech Republic

In the UK, a filter arrow is a green arrow which indicates to traffic that their movement does not conflict with any other movement and therefore they may proceed through the junction without stopping. It illuminates while the main signal is still at red. It is normally fixed to the left side of or underneath the green signal and shows a green left or ahead arrow.

This means that a motorist may only proceed in the direction of the arrow. In the Province of Quebec, a signal may display a green straight arrow alone, usually for five to nine seconds, and then the full green (or right turn arrow) illuminates. This allows pedestrians to emerge into the roadway, and therefore (in theory) increases safety. At a few intersections green arrows appear with the red ball to allow traffic to travel in a particular direction, but the red ball is always illuminated. Examples of where this occurs include the intersection of Delaware Avenue at Harrison Street in Wilmington, Delaware, and at the intersection of West 3rd Street and Mesaba Avenue in Duluth, Minnesota. This is also true in Chicago; the straight off straight on ramps from Lake Shore Drive to N Fullerton Ave display a red light and left turn arrow or a red light, never just a green arrow.

On the island of Montreal, Canada, it is forbidden to turn right while a red signal is present. At many intersections, lights will change from red to a green arrow permitting drivers to proceed straight through the intersection. This is called a leading through interval (LTI), after about five seconds or when the pedestrian signal changes to a flashing Orange Stophand, the green arrow is replaced with a green ball signal allowing drivers to proceed forward or turn as they wish.

== Public Transport ==
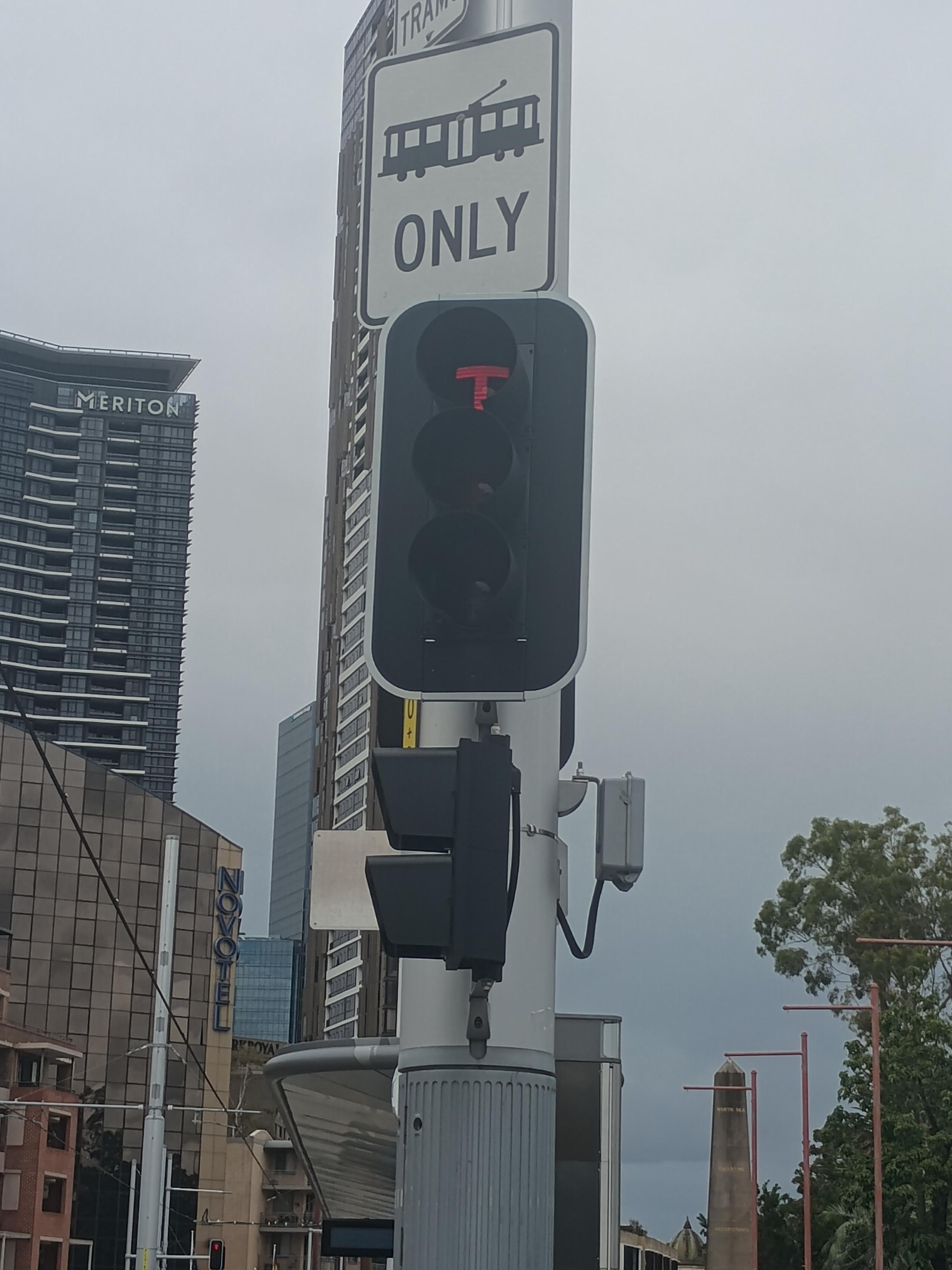
A T used for the street running section of the Parramatta Light Rail, in North Parramatta, New South Wales

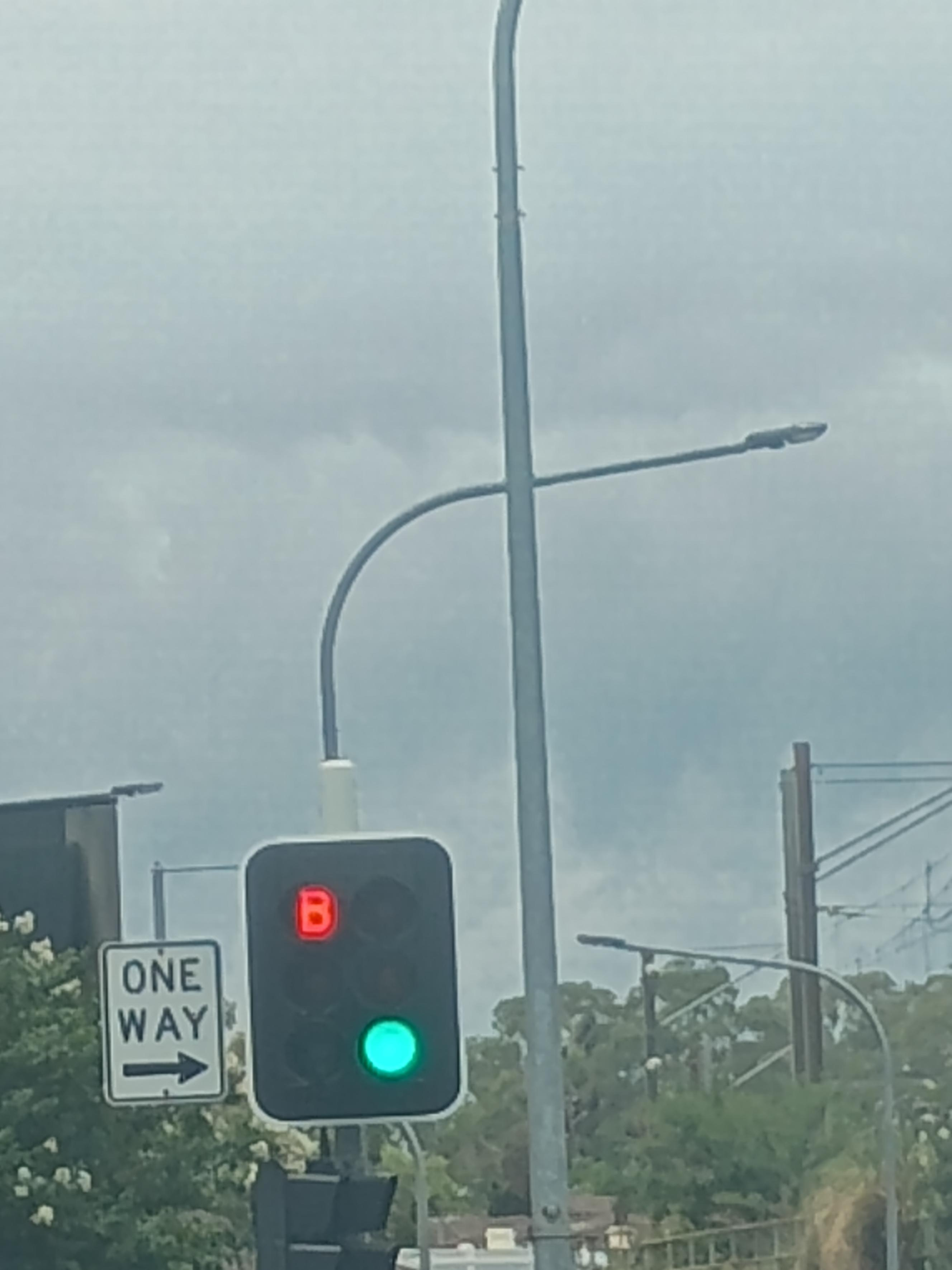
A B used for buses, also in North Parramatta

=== Transit priority signal ===
In Oregon, Ontario, Quebec, British Columbia, Nova Scotia, Manitoba and Alberta, traffic signals may also have an extra white rectangular light mounted above the red light. This phase indicates that a public transit vehicle – bus, streetcar, or LRT – may proceed through an intersection in any direction while all other traffic faces a red light. In Ontario, this light is identical to the vertical "go" transit signal used in Western Europe. The horizontal "Stop" European transit signal is not used in Ontario. In some areas in Quebec, a white rectangular light is either mounted Above or below the main signal

In some areas such as Boston, Massachusetts and Denver, Colorado, United States a streetcar may have its own traffic signals, indicating that it is okay for it to cross an intersection. These signals are all white, and the top section (stop) is a horizontal bar, the middle (caution) is an upright triangle, and the bottom (go) is a vertical bar. The horizontal bar is generally considered the "red" phase and symbolizes traffic flowing across the intersection from the perspective of the tram.

In Australia and New Zealand, buses and trams or light rail vehicles may have a white "B" and "T" light respectively to indicate they may proceed through the intersection in any direction. A white arrow indicates that they only may proceed in the arrow's direction, common for trams to indicate that they may proceed and the points are set for proceeding that direction. Transit signals may be accompanied by red and yellow B/T signals indicating to buses and trams stop and caution respectively. Along the northern half of Hong Kong Island, there is a similar "T" lamp in yellow for double-decker trams.

The stop and prepare to stop lights for trams and buses are red and yellow, respectively, as they are with other vehicles, whereas the light to proceed is white, distinct from that of regular vehicles.

In New South Wales, these are typically for places where trams and buses have their own lanes or roads that aren't open for general traffic. As such, B lights are typically, but not exclusively, used on T-Ways

Singapore uses a similar "B" light for buses, but it is green. The same signal is used in Mexico City for the extra fourth signal for Metro buses, but uses the Metrobús logo

In many parts of Western Europe transit signals (for trams, and in some cases buses as well) employ traffic signals that are phased similarly to main traffic signals but replace the green light with a vertical white bar, the red light with a horizontal white bar and the yellow with a white dot or diamond. This is intended to avoid confusion between transit signals and main traffic signals at intersections where both sets are visible.

In Russia, transit signals consist of four white lights, forming a "T". The bottom light is always illuminated when transit vehicles have permission to proceed. The top three lights represent the direction in which transit vehicles are permitted to proceed. For example, the left light allows transit vehicles to turn left, the middle light allows transit vehicles to proceed straight, and the right light allows transit vehicles to turn right. Multiple lights may be displayed at the same time, to allow transit vehicles to proceed in multiple directions at the same time. Transit signals are mostly used to give trams priority, but sometimes are used for buses and trolleybuses too.

In the UK, although priority signals are not used, one such installation exists on Chatham Road near Maidstone; a blue bus priority light which is located approximately 150 yards from the main traffic lights. When the sensor detects a bus, the blue light comes on for three seconds to let the bus driver know that it's detected the bus, and the traffic lights on that road immediately change to green to allow the bus through. No other installations are currently known to exist.

In Orlando, Florida, a LYMMO Bus may have its own traffic signals in the downtown area. These signals are all white, and the top section (stop) is a horizontal bar, the middle (caution) uses a right slanted bar, the bottom (go) is the vertical bar.

==== Indicative arrow ====
In Hong Kong, Ireland, Australia and the UK, (all of which are left-hand traffic jurisdictions) a right arrow may sometimes be displayed alongside a green light to indicate that oncoming traffic has been stopped and that it is safe to turn right, however this does not necessarily mean that the turn is fully protected and road users should always check that there is no oncoming or approaching traffic before turning.

==== Japanese green arrows ====
In Japan, a green arrow with the circular green is absolutely never shown. Instead, green arrows must be shown with the circular red. This means a signal may display green arrows pointing in all possible directions with the circular red. Another unusual sequence is that the circular red changes to circular yellow whenever some or all of the arrows end, and then changes back to red after the clearance period.

=== Steady red and amber arrows ===
In the UK, there are no red or yellow "arrow" lights, however there had been trials with the amber arrow in an attempt to prevent drivers from misinterpreting the signals. Also, turns are never permitted when a signal light is red. Layouts are typically simple: either the usual three-disc all-directions signal; the same with a separate green left or right filter arrow which lights up either independently of the main green (permitting a turn in the indicated direction at an otherwise red light) or along with it (showing that conflicting traffic has been stopped so turning traffic does not need to yield, also known as give way in the UK); or using adjacent sets where the horizontal positioning and lane layout (particularly where lanes are segregated by kerbs or islands) denotes which directions are stopped or free to move.

== Dallas phasing ==
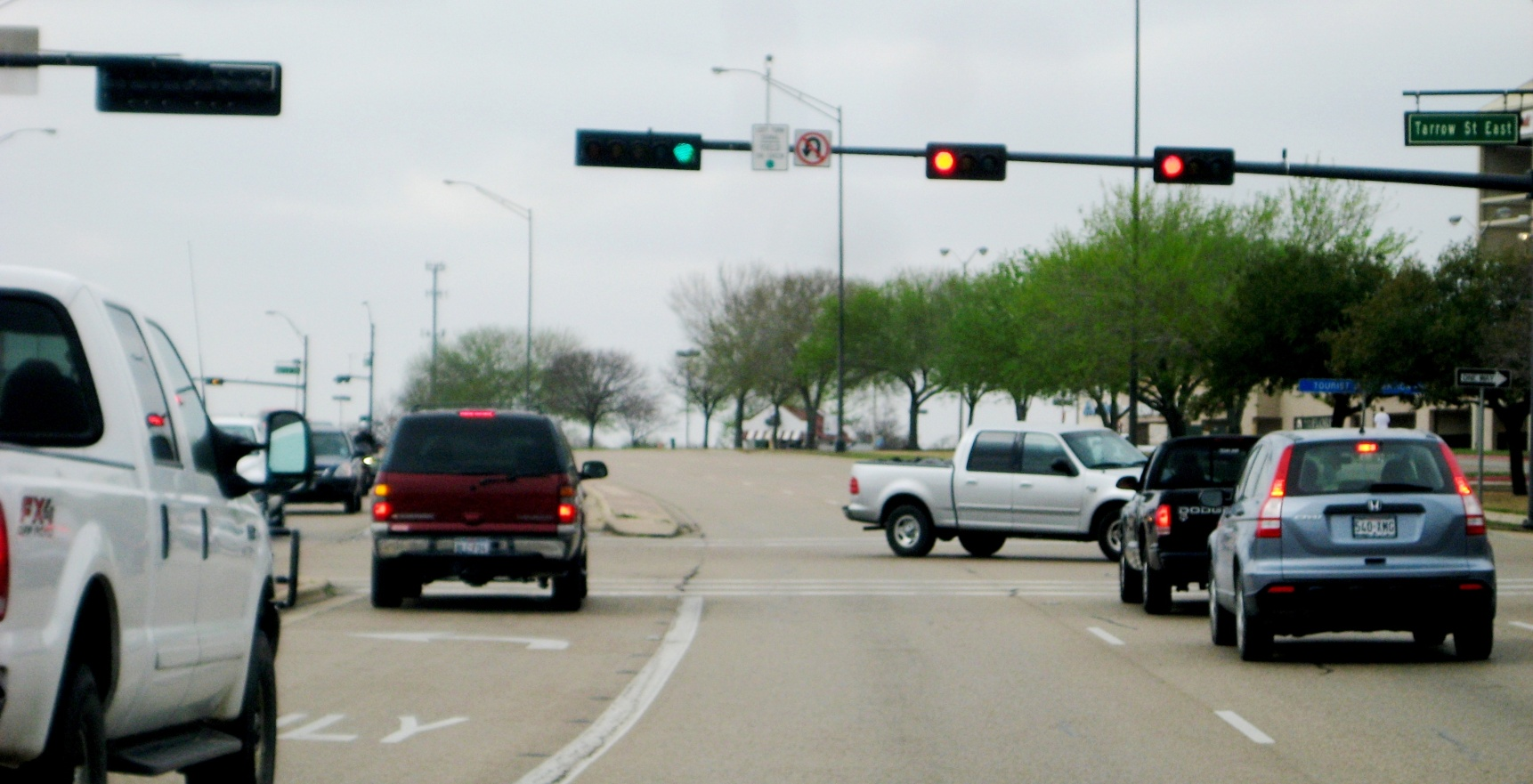
Horizontal Dallas display

In the configuration commonly known as Dallas phasing that began in the Dallas/Fort Worth Metroplex, Texas, United States, a right-hand traffic jurisdiction, the five-light left turn signal head is used in a different manner than standard signals of this type. The left turn signal head operates independently from the signals for straight-through traffic. This allows permissive turning even when straight-through traffic is shown a red light, avoiding yellow trap. Louvers are fitted over the green and yellow balls of the left turn signal head to prevent driver confusion. The left turn signal head is also accompanied by a sign indicating its special use.

In this configuration, a green left arrow, with the circular green or just a green arrow alone, will only be displayed during a leading protected–left-turn phase. An amber left arrow is displayed to signal the end of the protected phase. This is followed by only a circular green light for the lagging permissive–left-turn phase, during which it is assumed that opposing traffic has both a permissive left turn and a straight-through green light. This can also be used in the opposite sequence, with the permissive left-turn phase leading and the protected left-turn phase lagging.

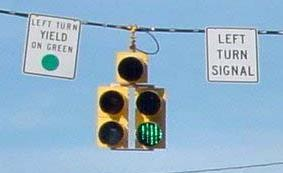
Doghouse Dallas display viewed from the left turn bay

Dallas phasing gives traffic engineers more flexibility with the leading and lagging protected left turn phase configurations allowing for better coordination between signals. There are also yellow and green arrows on Dallas phasing signals, permitting exclusive protected left-turn phases as well as protected/permissive left-turn phases.

The 2009 Manual of Uniform Traffic Control Devices prohibits this display for new installations in favor of the flashing-yellow-arrow left-turn signal, which accommodates both permissive and protected left turns. Older installations are allowed to stay until they are replaced.

=== Arlington phasing ===
Arlington County, Virginia, United States, used the classic five-light "doghouse" (1971) with steady green and yellow arrows on the left, and green and yellow balls on the right, topped by a red ball. The light sequence started with a green arrow, proceeding to a yellow arrow, then a green ball, yellow ball, and finishing with a red ball. The signal was accompanied by a sign stating that left turns (against oncoming traffic) were required to yield on a green ball. These were later replaced by four-light signals that included a flashing yellow arrow.

== Flashing red ball, yellow ball, or red arrow ==
Michigan uses a three-lamp traffic signal, with a red ball, yellow arrow, and green arrow; during the permissive turn, the red ball flashes. A flashing red ball signal on a "protected" left turn traffic signal indicates that left turning traffic may, after a full stop, complete their turn if and only if there is a long enough break in oncoming traffic. The flashing red usually occurs when the oncoming traffic has a green signal. This function is not enabled at intersections where it may not be safe to do so (restricted view of oncoming traffic, heavy pedestrian crossings, or double-lane left turns are good examples). Michigan usually indicates signals that are dedicated to turning traffic with a sign displaying "LEFT" or "RIGHT". This sign is normally illuminated at night. More recent installations in Michigan, however, have used flashing yellow arrow signal heads, which typically have not included left-turn signal signage. All flashing red ball signals in Michigan will gradually be phased out in favor of the flashing yellow arrow. The flashing red ball was also used in Maryland and Minnesota.

Delaware and Maryland have also been known to place flashing red arrows at certain intersections, especially when no signal is needed for cross traffic. The driver is required to come to a complete stop before turning. Cupertino, California, also used a four-lamp signal, with a steady red arrow, a flashing red arrow, a steady yellow arrow, and a steady green arrow; during the permissive turn, the flashing red arrow was displayed. These flashing red arrows were later replaced with flashing yellow arrows.

Dover, Delaware used a four-lamp signal. Forming a T, with a flashing red arrow on the left, a steady red arrow/ball on the right and yellow and green arrows on the bottom; during the permissive turn, the flashing red arrow is displayed.

Washington state, particularly Seattle, used a flashing yellow ball in the left-turn signal for the same purpose. Seattle also used a four-lamp signal at about 20 locations, with a red ball, a steady yellow ball, a flashing yellow ball, and a dual-mode yellow and green arrow; during the permissive turn, the flashing yellow ball was displayed. These were later replaced by flashing yellow arrows.

The Delaware method of using flashing red arrows has been published in the 2009 MUTCD as an alternative to the flashing yellow arrow. However, this was allowed only when an engineering study determined that a "stop condition" must be imposed during the permissive left turn movement. While the Delaware method of flashing red arrows are allowed in the MUTCD as alternative to the flashing yellow arrow, the Vienna Convention on Road Signs and Signals explicitly prohibits flashing any red arrow indication. As stated in the Vienna Convention, flashing red lights "are only used at level crossing, swing bridge, airport, fire station or ferry terminal" and flashing red arrows are not allowed.

== Australian turn arrows ==
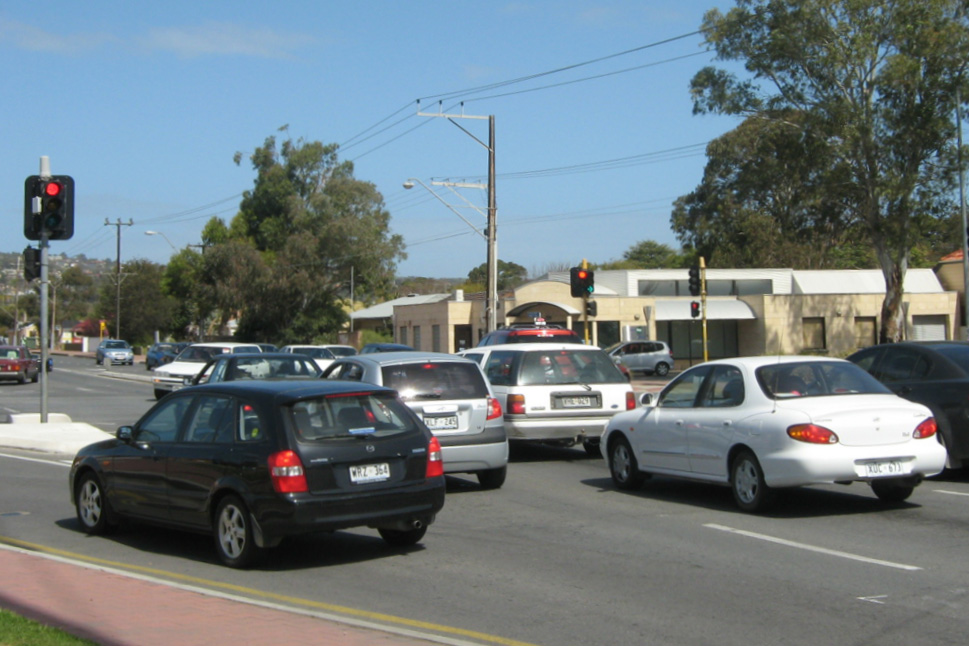
An intersection in South Australia. This intersection uses the Protected/Permissive right turn explained here. If right-turn traffic on the opposite side runs out, then the main light on the facing side will turn green with the shown arrow (in the distance) remaining green until it runs out of right-turn traffic.

In Victoria, Australia, (LHT) some intersections of this type employ a turn arrow without the red arrow. This would turn green with the main signal, before turning yellow, then off, giving priority to oncoming traffic. The nationwide standard seems to now include a red arrow that turns off. This arrow turns red simultaneously with the main light. After the cross traffic has had its turn, the arrows on opposite sides would both turn green, until one side runs out of right-turn traffic. In any case, when both sides of the intersection turn green, the corresponding arrow will turn off after a short delay, thus working similarly to the old Victorian standard. This method has the advantage of being controlled during peak hours, where controllers would be able to prevent the arrow from turning off in extreme peak-hour traffic, but causes confusion as drivers expect a light to be on when three are present.

== Pedestrian crossings ==
=== Flashing red at pedestrian crossings ===
In Australia, New Zealand, some SADC countries (such as South Africa), Canada and most of the US, a flashing red or orange pedestrian signal is used at between green and steady red; it means "complete crossing but do not start to cross". This has a similar meaning to European flashing green, but means that if a pedestrian glances at it, they will not enter an intersection without enough time to leave. In the US and in parts of Canada, Australia and New Zealand (e.g., Auckland CBD) pedestrian signals which count down the number of seconds (see Timers below) until cross traffic has the right of way are becoming popular at heavily used pedestrian crossings such as in urban shopping districts.

==== Turkey ====
Samsun Turkey

A 2025 academic study found that “current regulations such as pedestrian crossings and traffic lights are not enough to provide a sense of safety for pedestrians.“ Another 2025 study claimed that running a red light is against traffic regulations. The Vienna Convention on Road Signs and Signals specifies that a flashing amber light allows drivers to proceed with particular care, however Turkey reserves the right to use a flashing red light on a minor road at times when traffic is light. A flashing red light means stop, then proceed if the road is clear. A government document says that pedestrian crossings are only safe if everyone follows the rules.

=== Flashing pedestrian green ===
In British Columbia, a flashing green globe signal is used at a pedestrian crossing or intersection, at which pedestrians have the ability to stop traffic to allow a safe crossing. They may also be used at a drawbridge. The flashing green indicates that the signal is not currently in use. After the pedestrian pushes the button to trigger the signal, the light becomes a steady green until the sequence of yellow, then red (at which time the pedestrian crossing gives a walk signal) as in a conventional set of traffic lights, then returns to flashing green until another crossing is requested. This indication is also used in Massachusetts at fire stations and at crosswalks accompanied by a red and yellow pedestrian phase or a normal pedestrian signal.

In several European countries and Mexico, a flashing green light is used in crosswalks to indicate that signal is going to change from green to red soon. Therefore, flashing green has roughly the same meaning to pedestrians as ordinary yellow signal has for motorists. Slow-moving pedestrians are warned about oncoming signal change and have opportunity to wait for next signal cycle. Motorists are more likely to notice flashing signal. Drivers of vehicles about to cross pedestrian crossings should be more aware of incoming pedestrians.

Current users of flashing green signal are Austria, Belgium, Estonia, Finland, Great Britain, Hungary, Netherlands, Norway, Mexico, Poland, Russia, Spain and Sweden. France, Portugal and Switzerland make limited use of flashing green. In the UK and Ireland, the flashing pedestrian green signal is used at Pelican Crossings to indicate that pedestrians should not start to cross if they are not already on the crossing.

Samsun Turkey

=== Pedestrian red–amber light ===
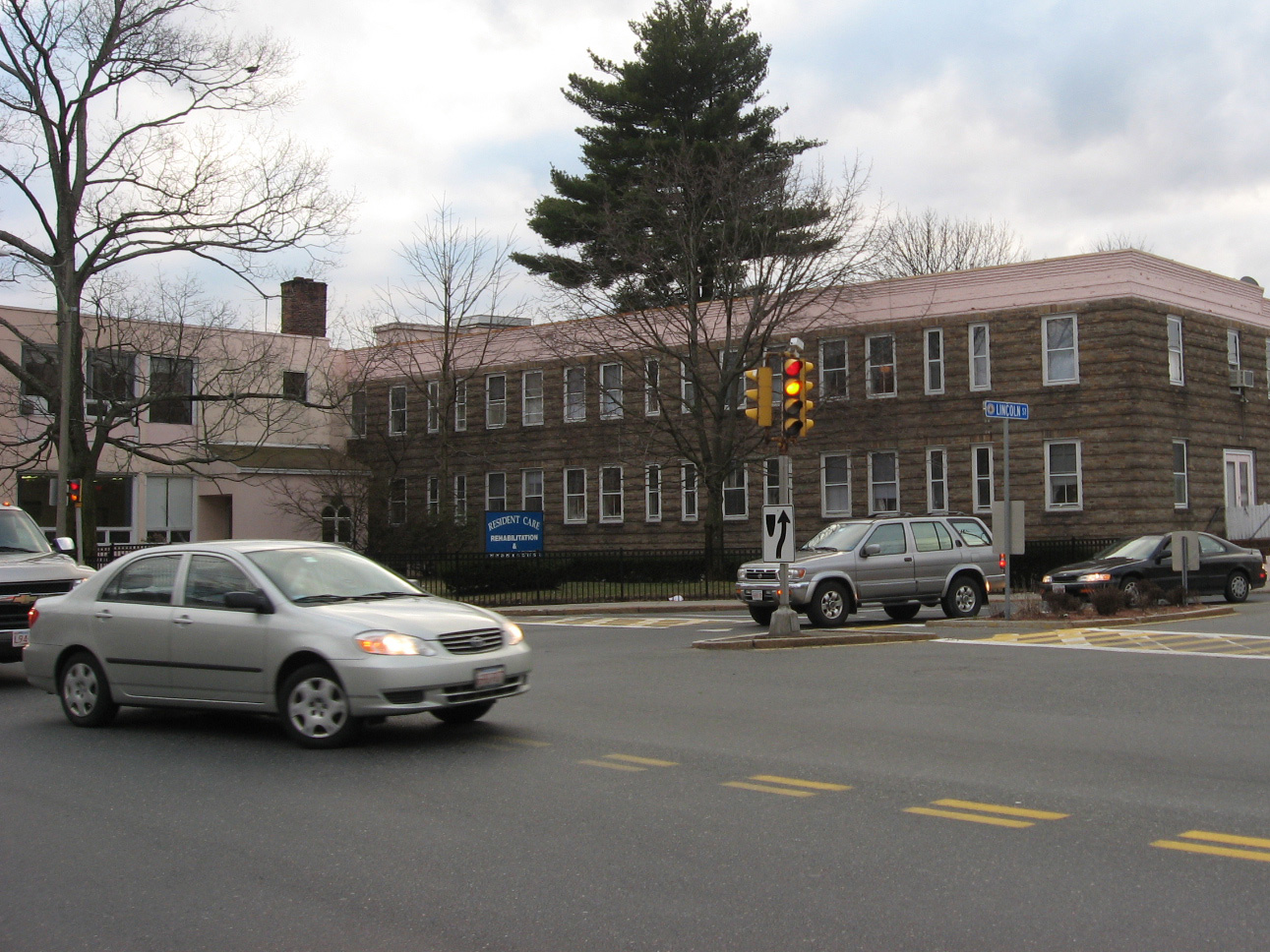
Red and yellow pedestrian signaling at an intersection in Framingham, Massachusetts

In Massachusetts, simultaneous red and yellow lights in all directions allow a pedestrian to cross diagonally. This replaces the conventional pedestrian signal, but is in violation of the MUTCD. This practice is obsolescent but it remains in the Massachusetts driver's manual.

== Signage ==
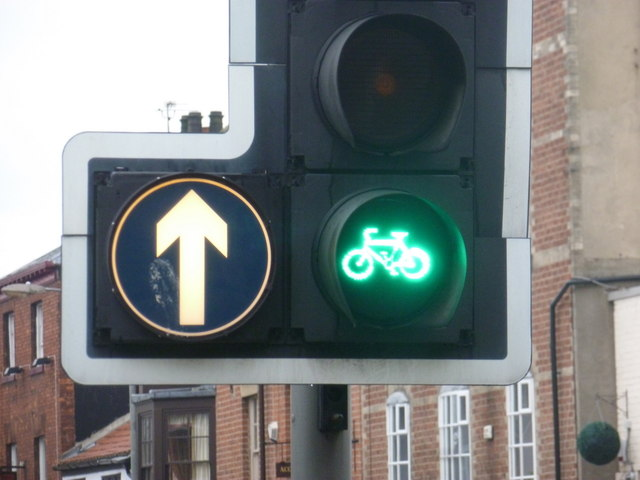
A bicycle signal indicating that cyclists can only proceed in the ahead direction

In the UK, signs can be affixed to a signal head to emphasise a regulatory traffic sign. The most common use for these is prohibited turns.

== Special signals ==
=== Emergency priority signal ===
At many intersections in the US, intersections use traffic signal preemption to give priority to emergency vehicles. These preemption applications often include an illuminated "notifier" signal. A notifier is a secondary lighting device usually mounted independently of the traffic signal, such as a standard or strobing light bulb in an omni-directional enclosure or spotlights aimed at oncoming traffic lanes. The colors of these secondary lighting devices vary regionally depending upon the operational policies of the local traffic management and emergency service agencies.

=== Reverse-side red indicator ===
Some jurisdictions use special small blue lights on the back sides of signal heads to indicate red -light state. They are used by police. Other jurisdictions simply drill a small hole in the red signal visor to allow police to see the status of the signal from a wide angle (but not directly opposite the signal). In France and, perhaps, Vietnam (which was previously a French colony by the name of Indochina), the back of the red lights are sometimes designed with a red cross to indicate that the light is red, so that opposing left-turning drivers know that oncoming traffic has been stopped.

== Pre-warning of a changing signal ==
=== Between green and amber ===
In Austria, Cambodia, China, Croatia, Estonia, Latvia, Lithuania, Montenegro, Moldova, Russia, most of Israel, Malaysia, most of Mexico (Turn phase only on Thru + Left signals in some places such as Guadalajara, Mexico)(see "Steady green arrows" section), Guatemala, some places in Thailand, Dominican Republic, Turkey, Saudi Arabia, parts of Serbia, and in certain other parts of Europe, the green lights will start flashing at the end of the Go or Turn phase to indicate that the yellow (Caution phase) lights are about to be engaged. This is useful in fast-paced roads to allow for longer slowing down time, and for pedestrians crossing broad streets. Some traffic lights in Pennsylvania illuminate the yellow light a few seconds before the green light turns off, to give this same warning, as did some lights in the Los Angeles area until at least the late 1970s, and one light in Glendale, AZ at 56th Avenue &Glenn until it was replaced in the early 1980s. Traffic lights in East Germany also used to turn on the amber light together with the green light to signify that the green phase is about to end.

In the United States, the 2009 Manual of Uniform Traffic Control Devices prohibits any display that gives warning of an upcoming signal change, unless that display is placed well upstream of the signal (See "Warnings of traffic light ahead" below), so traffic at the stop line cannot see it.

=== Between red and green ===
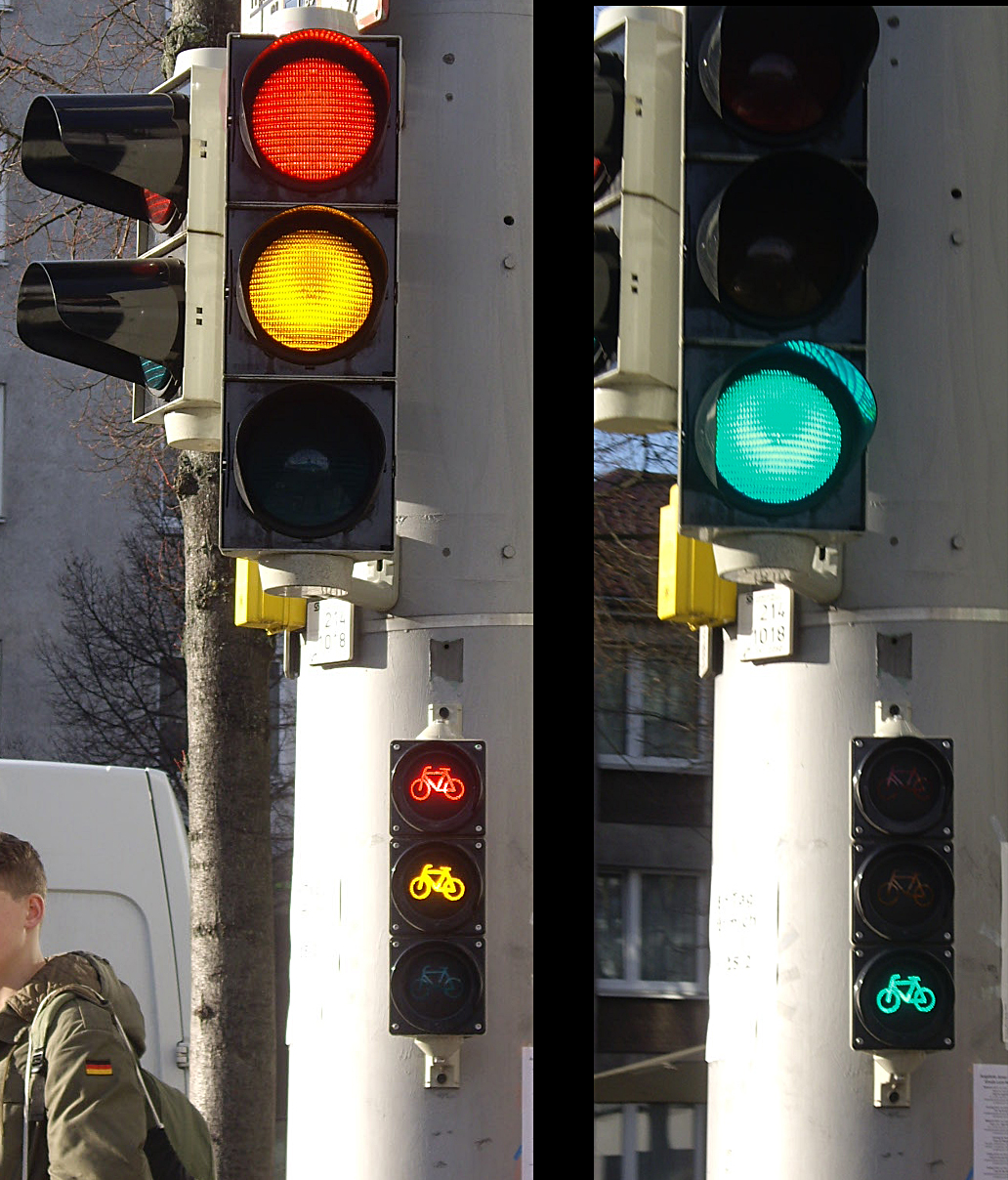
A traffic light in Germany turning from red to green

In most European countries (including Austria, Belarus, Bosnia and Herzegovina, Bulgaria, Croatia, the Czech Republic, Denmark, Estonia, Finland, Germany, Hungary, Iceland, Latvia, Lithuania, Malta, Moldova, Montenegro, North Macedonia, Norway, Poland, most of Russia, Serbia, Slovakia, Slovenia, Sweden, Switzerland, Ukraine, and the UK), as well as in Argentina, Bahrain, Botswana, Colombia, Hong Kong, some places in India, some places in Indonesia, Israel, Liberia, Macau, Pakistan, Paraguay, and the United Arab Emirates, red and yellow lights are displayed together for one, two, or three seconds at the end of the red cycle to indicate that the light is about to change to green. This phase aids the drivers of vehicles to turn on the engines again (there are requests/advice to turn off engine in front of red traffic lights in some countries, e.g. Switzerland), or drivers with manual gearboxes, giving them time to change into first gear during the short phase, as well as drivers of vehicles that may have been yellow-trapped whilst turning right (or left in LHT countries) a chance to clear the intersection in more safety. It also informs drivers who may be approaching the intersection at speed that a green light is imminent, so they may proceed through the junction without having to stop (or, with enough of a lead distance, even having to slow), reducing the potential annoyance (and safety risk) of braking sharply to a halt only to have the green light appear immediately after.

=== Between green and red ===
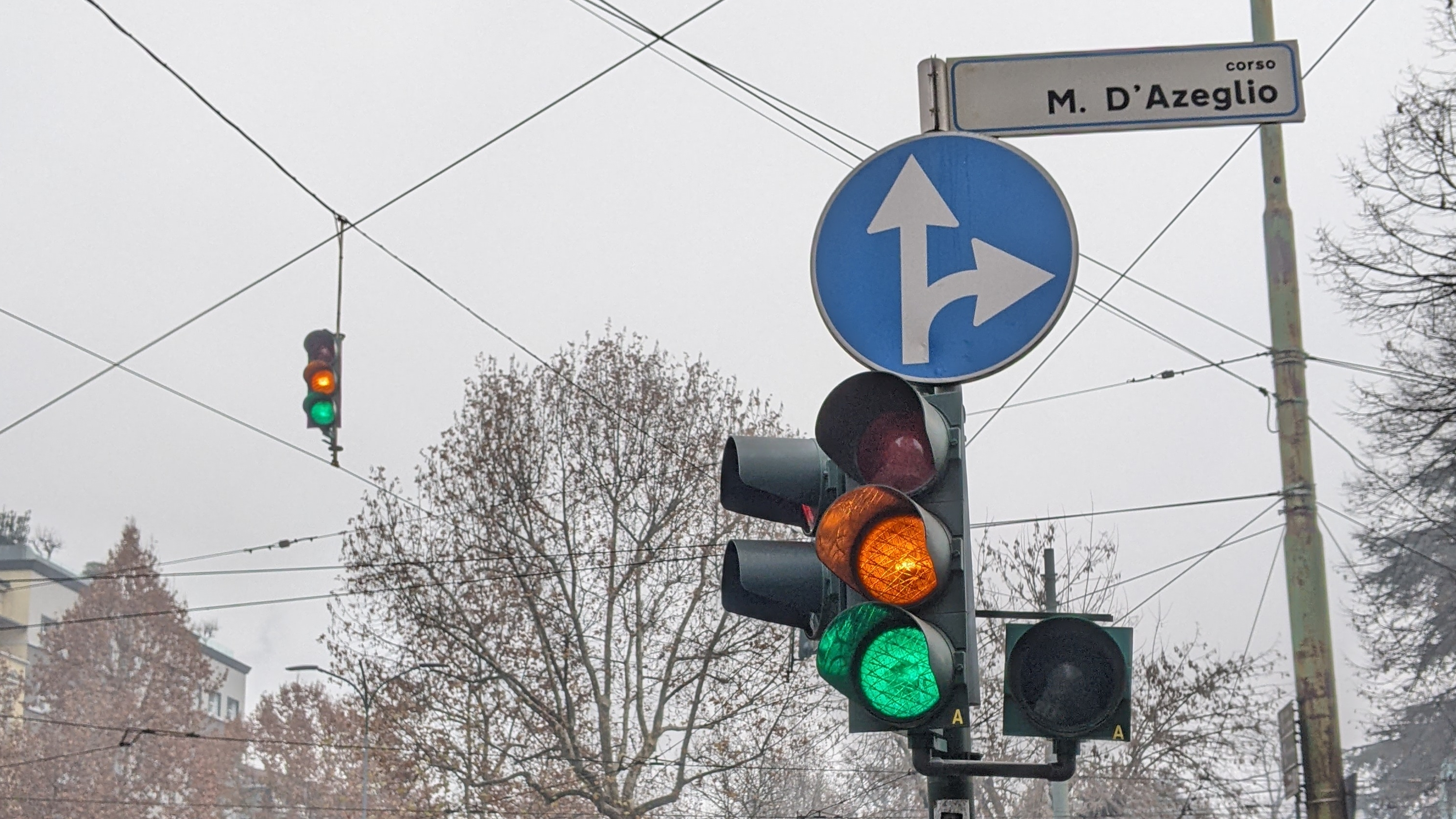
A traffic light in Italy displaying green and yellow

Traffic lights in Greece, Italy and Sweden used to show a green and yellow light together, to indicate that the light was about to change to red. All countries now officially use a single yellow light instead, as displaying both the yellow and the green lights is in violation of the Vienna Convention on Road Signs and Signals.

== Traffic signal ahead ==
=== Prepare to stop ===
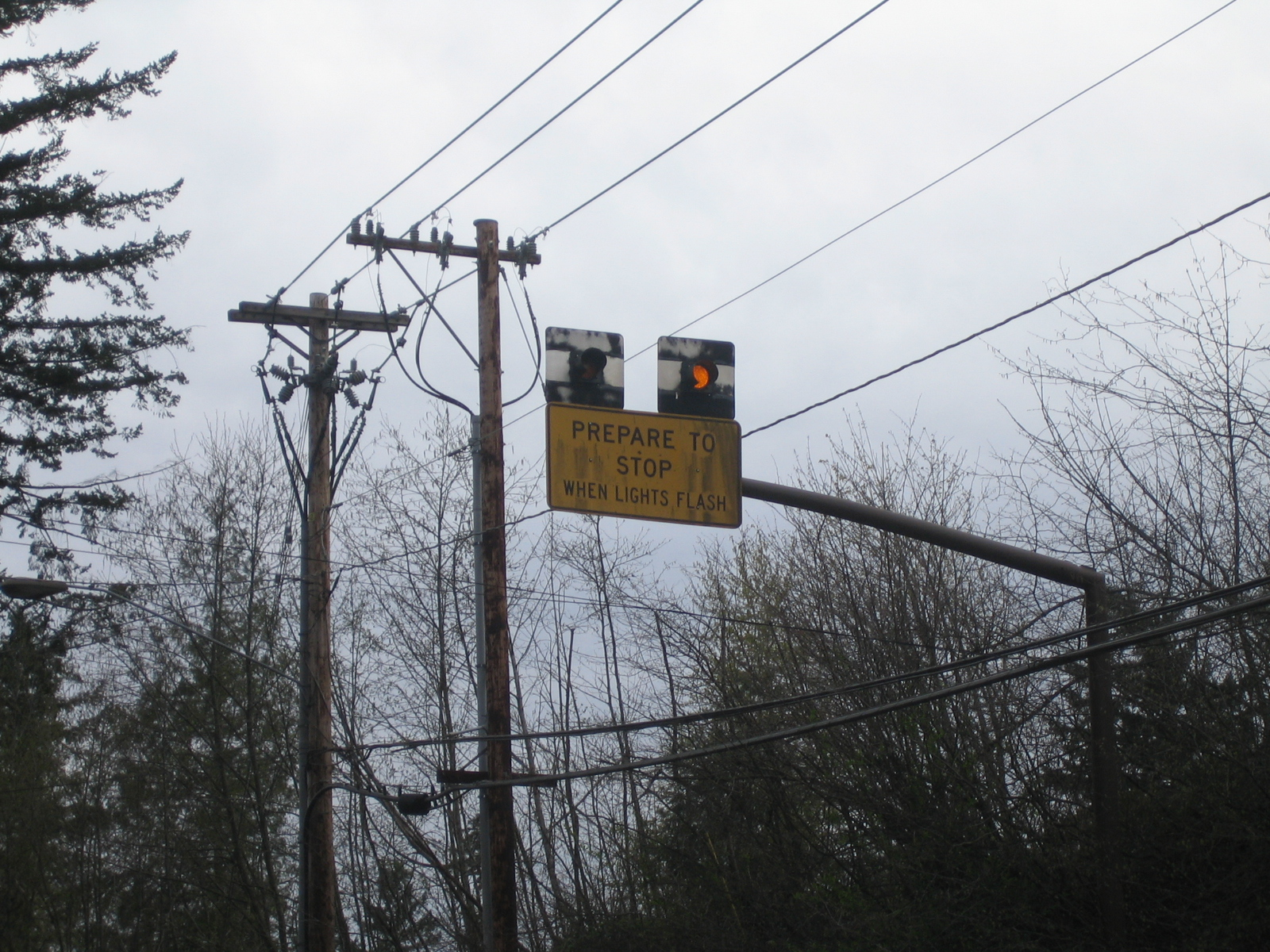
One example of a preemptive traffic signal warning sign

In some areas, a "prepare to stop" sign with two alternately flashing yellow lights is installed in locations where a high-speed road (design speed usually at least 55 mph / 90 km/h) leads up to a traffic light, where the traffic light is obscured from a distance (or both conditions), or before the first traffic signal after a long stretch of road with no signals. This is installed so that drivers can view it from a distance. This light begins blinking with enough time for the driver to see it and slow down before the intersection light turns yellow, then red. The flashing yellow light can go out immediately when the light turns green, or it may continue for several seconds after the intersection light has turned green, as it usually takes a line of cars some time to accelerate to cruising speed from a red light. These are relatively common in areas such as the United States, Canada, Western Australia, New South Wales, New Zealand and Liberia. Japan uses a variant signal with two lamps, a green one and a flashing yellow one, for the same purpose.

A common way of warning that an obscured traffic light ahead is red is a red-signal-ahead sign. It is shaped like a standard yellow diamond shape sign with LEDs spelling out "Signal Ahead". Just before the traffic light goes yellow, the word "Red" will light up above Signal Ahead and they will begin to flash alternately.

=== White strobe lights ===
A number of countries installed strobe lights on traffic signals until the 1990s. Such installations have since then been prohibited by both the FHWA and the Vienna Convention.

==== United States ====
In some parts of the US, a few traffic lights have slowly flashing white strobe lights superimposed on the center of the red light, which are activated when the red light itself is illuminated. These are common on highways with few traffic signals; in high-traffic, and high-speed areas (where drivers running red lights are a major problem); in places where regular travelers would not expect a signal (such as a newly erected signal or one put up for construction); and in other situations where extra work may be needed to draw attention to the status of the light (such as in an area where many other red lights approximate the brightness, placement and color of a red traffic signal). The strobe may also be a flash from a camera located within the traffic signal itself (there has been much dispute as to whether this is legal or not). These are also used in areas prone to fog, as the strobing white light may be visible from a distance while the standard red light is not. A newer variant uses a flashing white LED ring located on the outer edge of the red indication as opposed to in the center of the red. Typically one strobe-equipped signal is mounted as a supplement between two normal signal heads. However such strobe installations have been prohibited by the FHWA since 1990; but individual states have been slow to conform. The current MUTCD (2009 edition) contains an explicit prohibition against their use; therefore, it is still FHWA's position that strobe lights are not allowed in traffic signals and no further experimentation with these types of strobe lights in traffic signals will be approved.

An example of this was located at the end of the Massachusetts I-90 Exit 51 in Chicopee, where the ramp ends at I-291. It has since been replaced with a completely modern design. Another example of this is at the intersection of Alabama State Route 53 and Dale County route 18 in which traffic approaching on AL-53 have a strobe light, although it appears that they no longer flash anymore and serve as a single red light now.

==== Europe and Asia ====
As in the US, strobe lights are not allowed in traffic signals in European and Asian countries. The Vienna Convention on Road Signs and Signals, including the European Annex, contains an explicit prohibition against their use, and any installation of strobe lights in traffic signals is in breach of the convention.

== Unusual designs ==
=== Square backplates ===
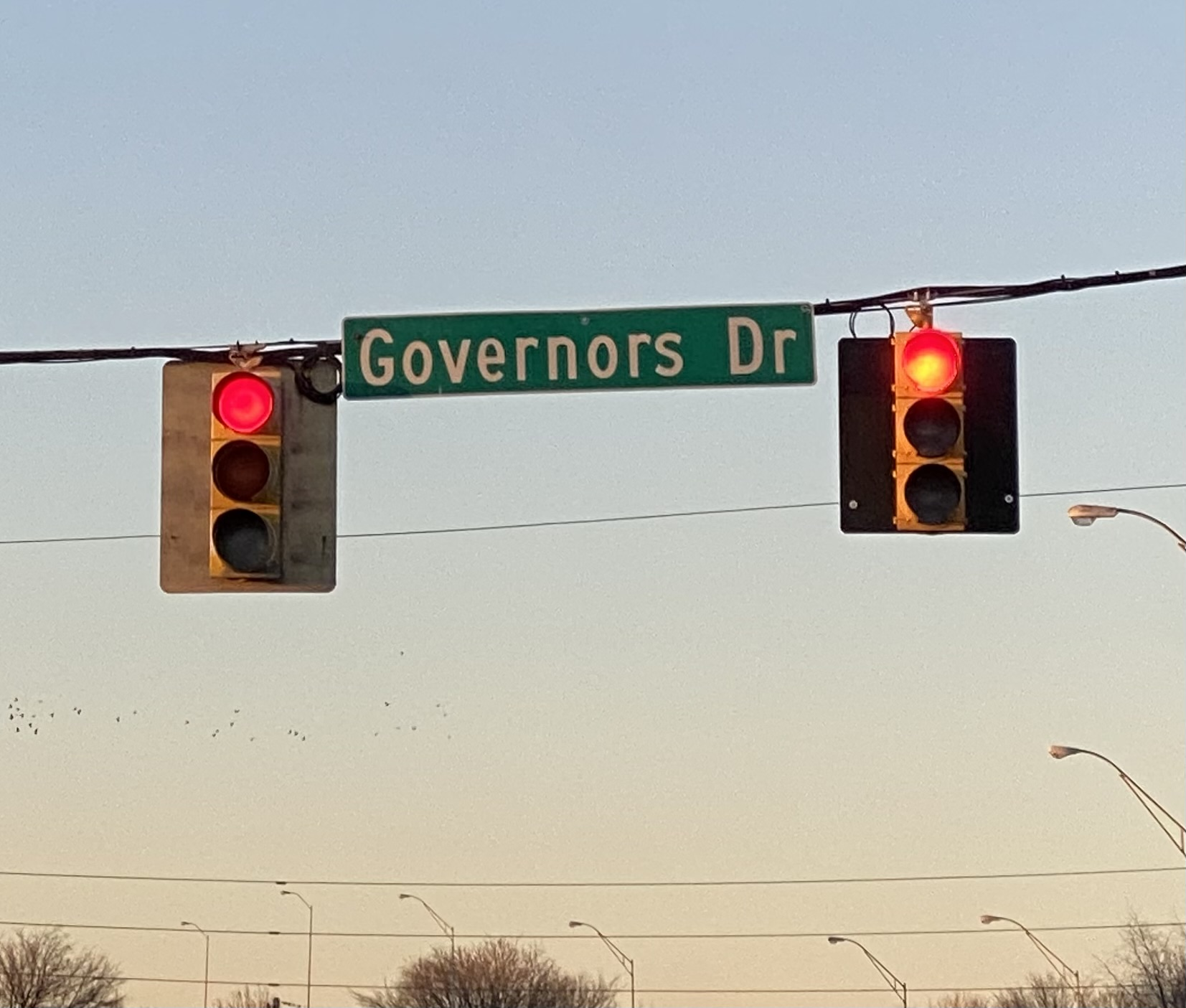
Two traffic lights in Huntsville that use the square backplate design

Huntsville, Alabama has a unique design for its traffic lights that use a square shaped backplate on the majority of its traffic lights. These square backplates have also been introduced to many Dallas doghouse traffic lights across the United States. Some newer traffic lights may have a reflective yellow outline on them, such as the ones at the intersection of Wynn Drive and Bradford Drive.

=== Shaped lenses ===
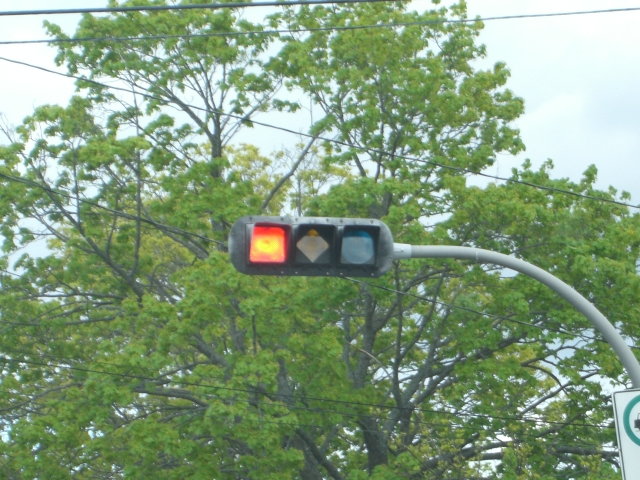
A traffic signal in Halifax, Nova Scotia with specially shaped lights to assist people with colour blindness

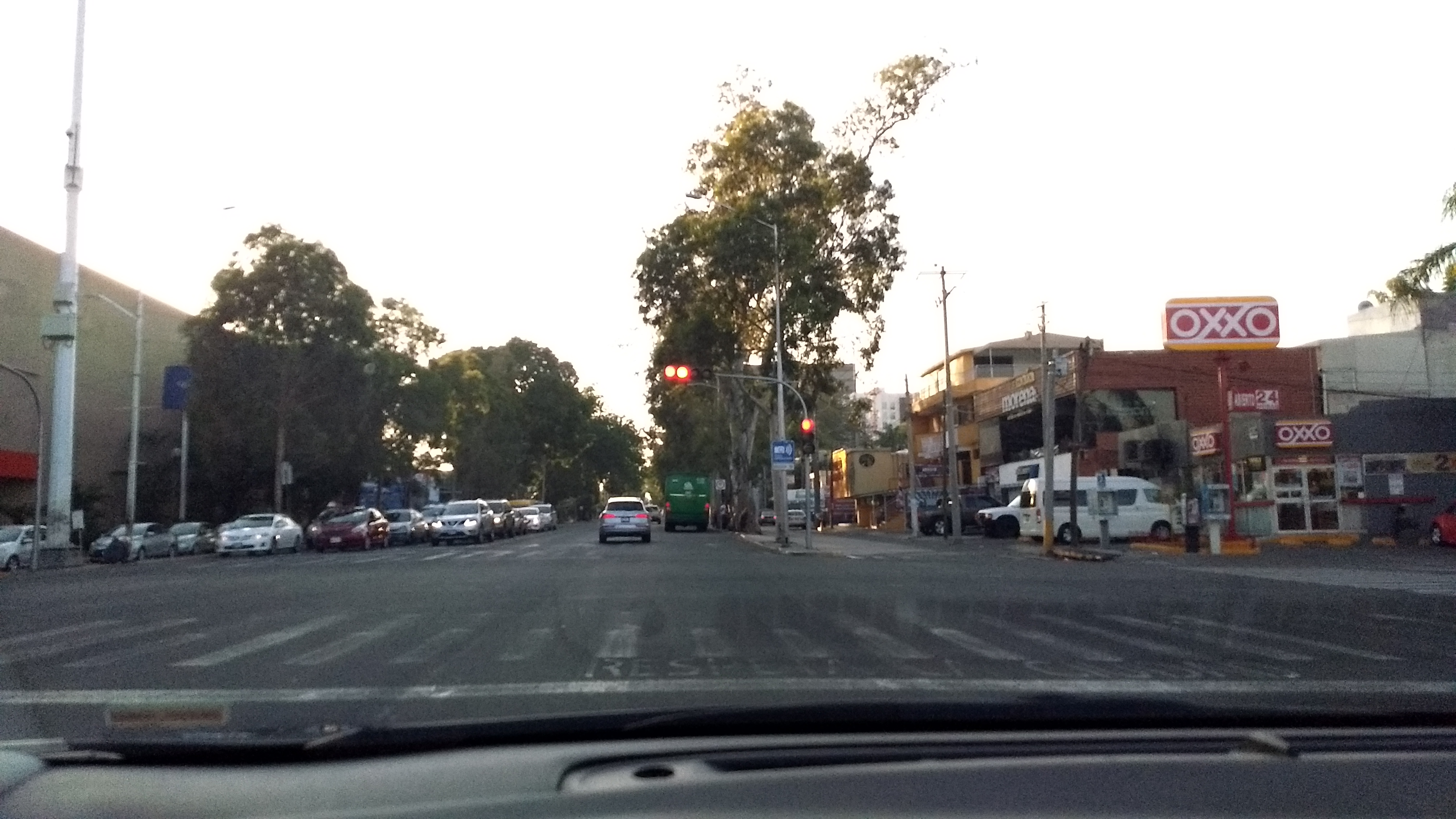
A traffic light in Guadalajara, Jalisco, Mexico, with a double red light for redundancy and increased visibility

The Canadian provinces of Quebec, New Brunswick, and Prince Edward Island generally use horizontal traffic lights with red to the left and green to the right. Such traffic lights are also found in Nova Scotia and eastern Ontario. These signals also use specific shapes for each color, which aids color-blind people in distinguishing signal aspects:

- green – an ordinary circle shape,
- yellow – a diamond shape, and
- red – a square (somewhat larger than the circle).

=== Double red ===
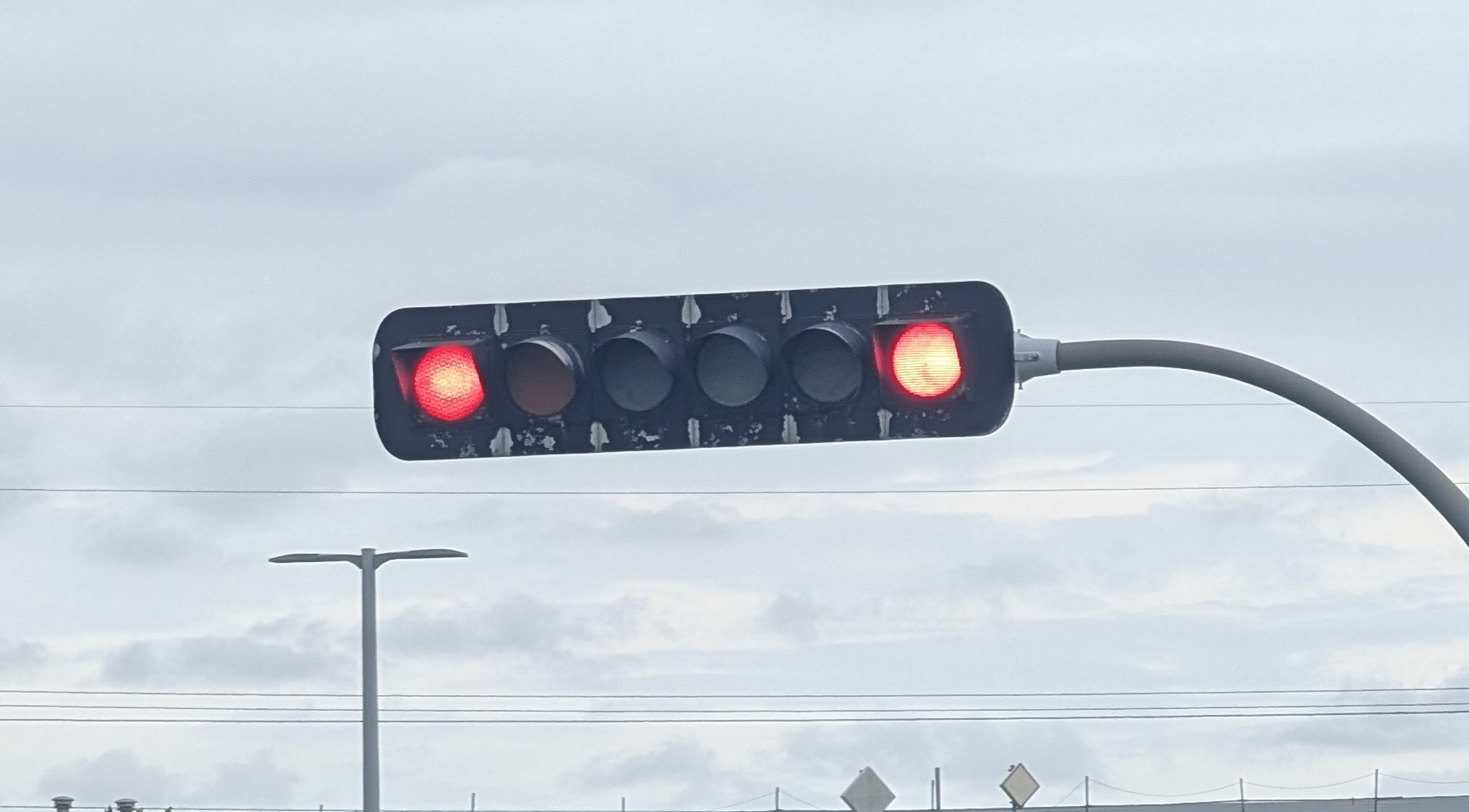
A traffic signal in Montreal with red bulbs on the left and right sides of the light

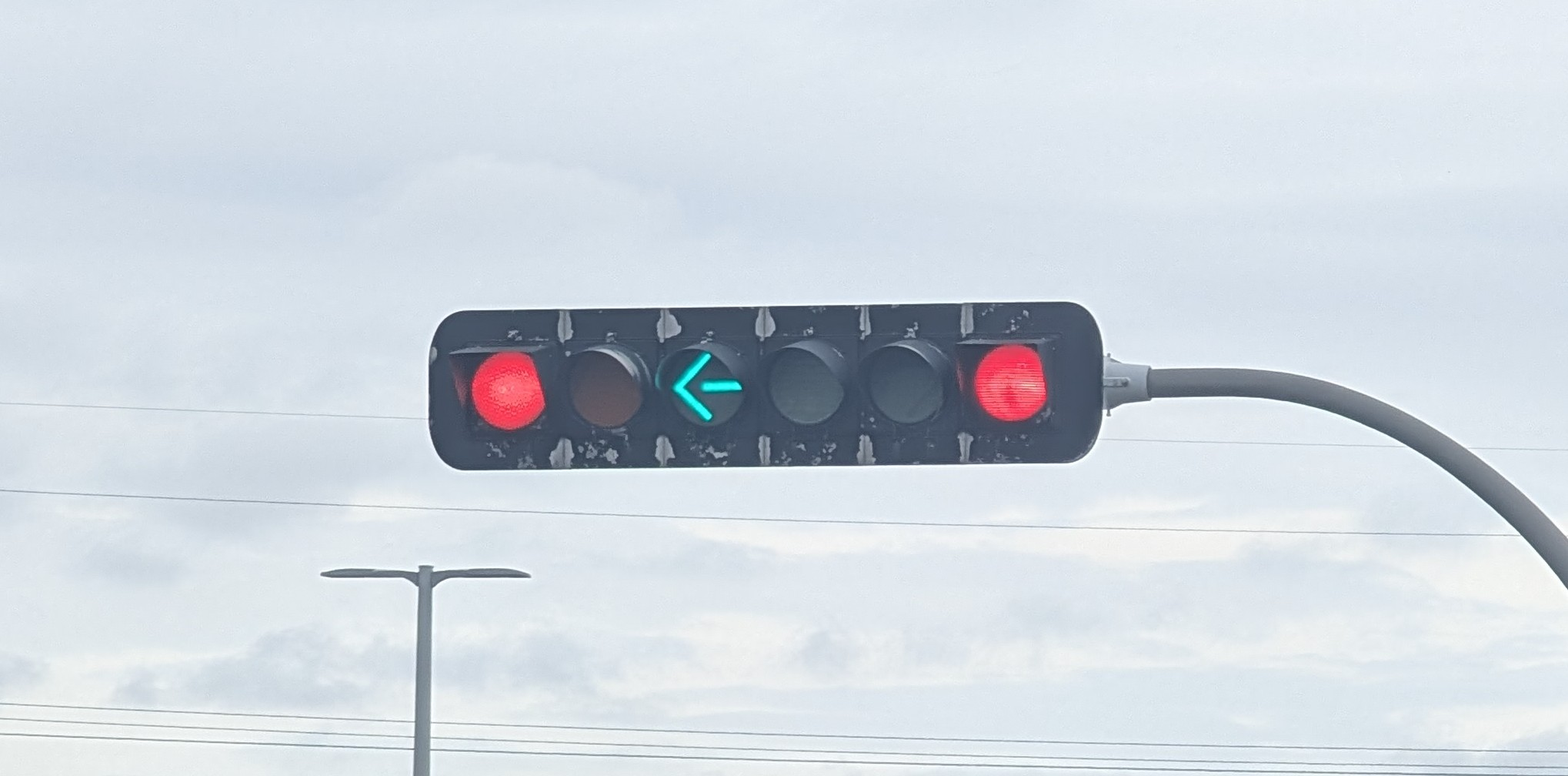
A traffic signal in Montreal with two red bulbs, and a green left arrow

In Quebec, most horizontal traffic lights have a red signal on both sides of the fixture (left and right). They are also now replacing the shaped traffic lights for color-blind people with regular round signals. These are also seen on horizontal traffic lights in Eastern Ontario and in Nova Scotia.

In some Texas urban areas, including Houston and Dallas, the use of a double red light is different. It is typically used on left turn signals. For horizontally mounted signals, typically hung or mounted over the lanes, it is configured with two red balls or arrows, one yellow arrow or ball, and a green arrow (from left to right). For vertically mounted signals, the two red balls or arrows are on the top, then a yellow arrow or ball, and a green arrow. It is usually accompanied by signs saying "left turn signal" or "left on arrow only". Signals for traffic going straight use standard signals, usually mounted horizontally over the road. The use of two red lights on the left turn signal allows for redundancy in case one of the red lights burns out, while saving money by requiring only one signal for left turns per direction that needs one. It also prevents the yellow trap that would occur at night if a single red signal burned out and left-turning vehicles obeyed the circular signals instead.

One type of installation in Texas uses a double red light instead of a single red light to make the red light more pronounced and visible from a distance. In this installation, it is the first traffic light on a rural highway for miles, and traffic approaches at highway speed (65 mph). The double red light makes the red phase of the light visible at a greater distance than the yellow and green on the same signal. This installation is also used on rural highways in California, always in a vertical configuration, and in either configuration in some cities of Mexico, such as Guadalajara.

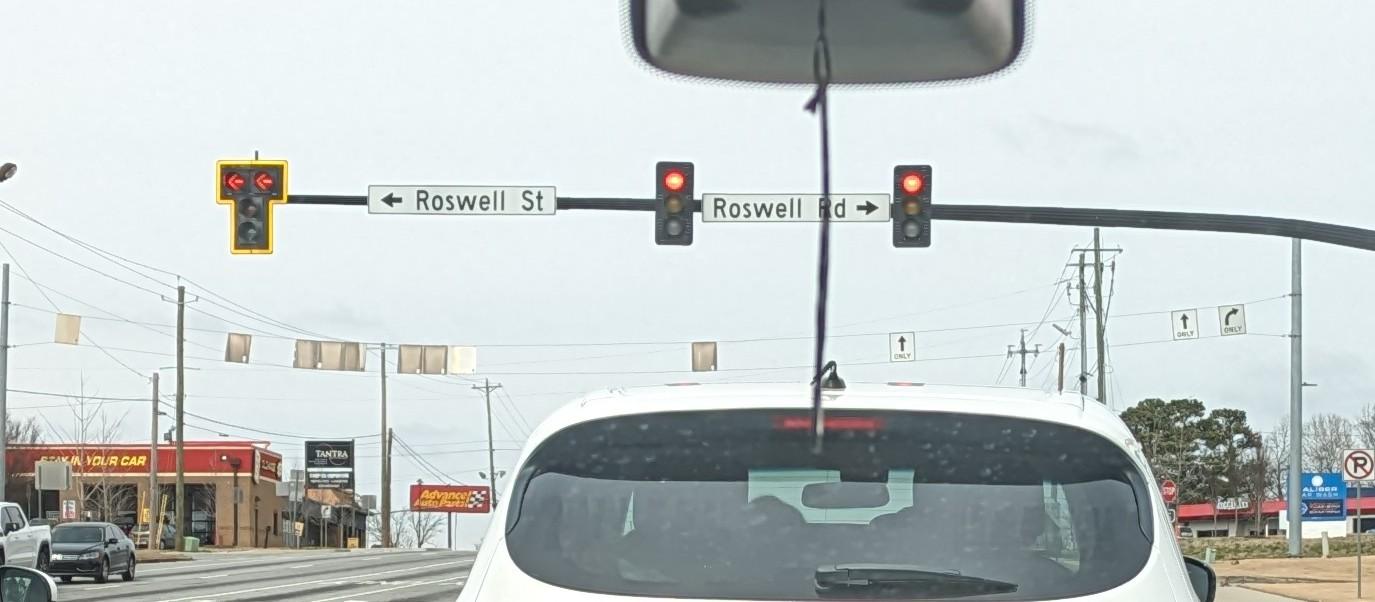

The double-red light also appears in Georgia, South Carolina and North Carolina in left-hand turn lanes. It serves the same purpose as the vertical Texan configuration, and mainly appears on boulevards with multiple lanes of traffic where a left turn is dangerous due to poor visibility. Double red arrows are used for left turn installations on some county-managed roads in Henrico County, Virginia and Baltimore County, Maryland.

The double–red-ball aspect is used in Saskatchewan and Alberta, Canada, to indicate a protected-prohibited left turn signal. A sign with the universal no left turn symbol and a depiction of the double red light is mounted near the signal to indicate that no left turns are permitted on a double-red light. Intersections with this configuration are quite common in Saskatoon, Calgary, and Edmonton. According to Transportation Alberta, there is no legal significance to a double red light.

In some cities in Mexico, the double red light is treated as a standard red signal; the double light is used to increase the signal's visibility, as well as to provide a redundant light in case one fails.

=== Clock-type ===
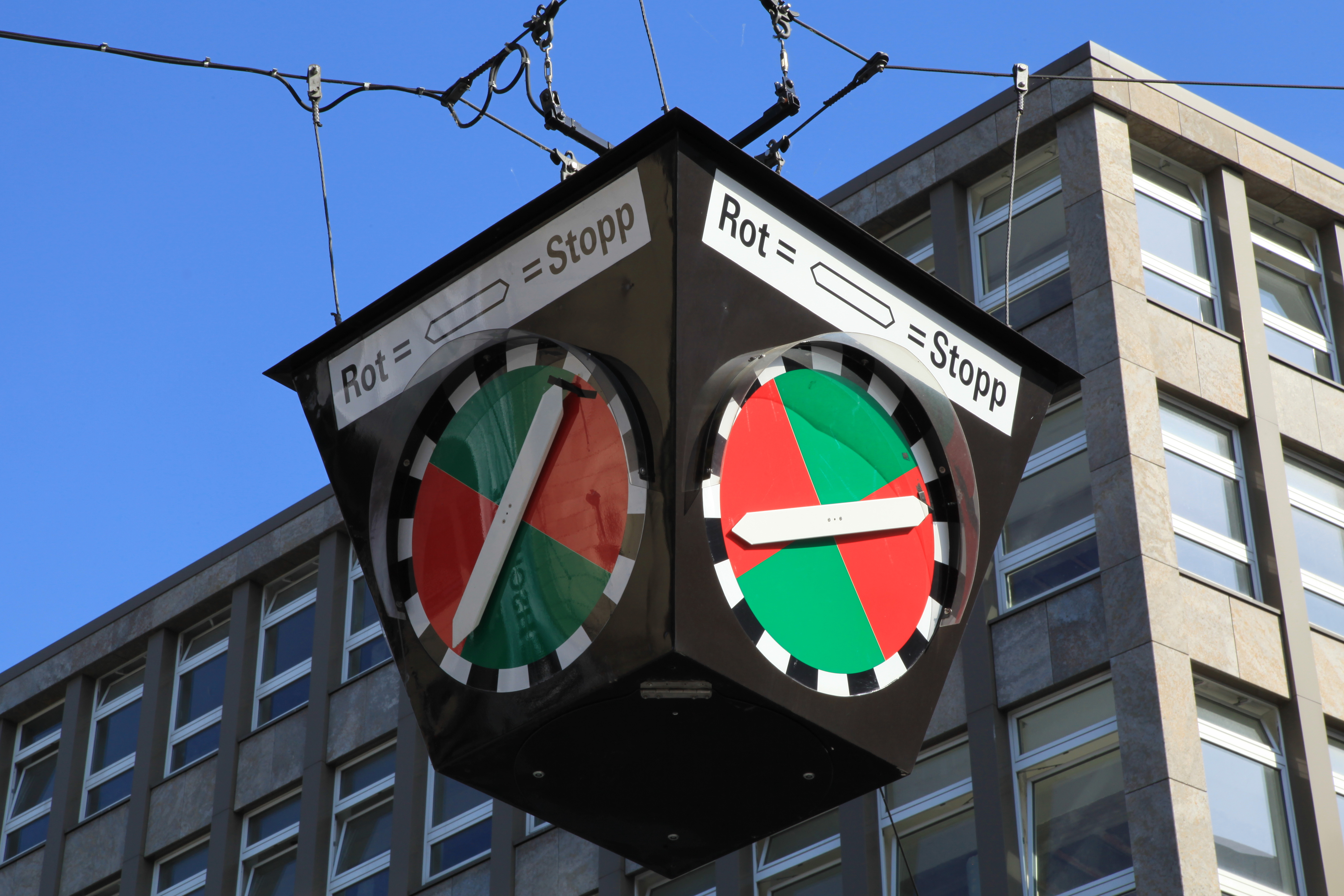
Reproduction of a "Heuer-Ampel" in Bochum at the Bongardstraße–Kortumstraße intersection

These so-called "Heuer-Ampeln", developed by the German Heuer-Hammer company were used in the Netherlands, Austria (Vienna) and Germany from the 1930s until the 1960s, with the last of them being replaced with the by then common known traffic lights in 1972.

=== Bar signals ===
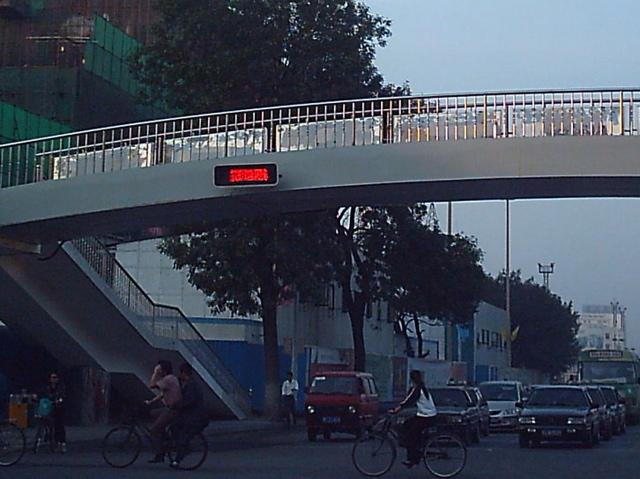
The "bar traffic light" in Tianjin (variant one)

In Tianjin, one system is where there is a horizontal bar in a specific colour, with the colour changing and the bar shrinking. The shrinking bar indicates the time remaining in that colour. The colour itself is either red (stop), yellow or green (go). A blinking green one-third-full bar means "reduce speed now", and a blinking yellow full bar indicates "proceed with caution".

When lights of this system turn from green to red, the diminishing green bar will flash once two-thirds (note: not the full bar) of the green bar is "eaten up", with the remaining third intact. A full, uninterrupted yellow bar will appear for a few seconds before, after a short blink, lights turn red. Immediately after the full red bar appears, two of the tiny (almost unnoticeable) split/divisions that split the bar into thirds appears to signify the bit that will not be "eaten up". This corresponds to the usual position of a red light (leftmost, or rightmost if at the other end of the road and at the other side of the pavement; or the upper third). When two-thirds of the red bit is "eaten up", the red light extinguishes, only to be replaced nearly immediately with a full chunk of green (again with the minute division). The process then repeats itself.

=== Multi-colour aspects ===
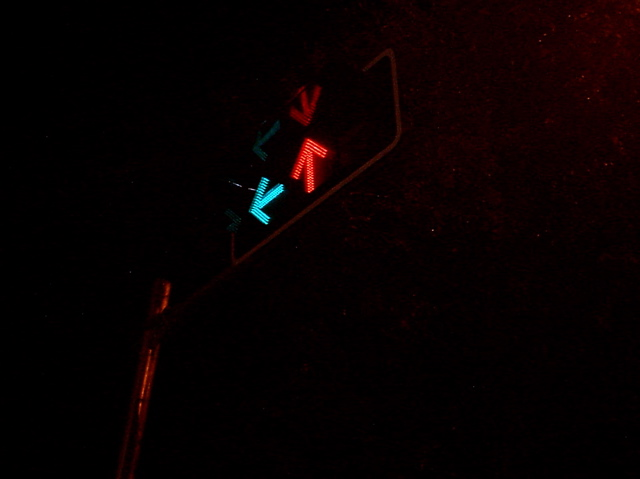
The "multiple arrow traffic light" in Tianjin (variant two)

Another system, which is also common in the other cities in China, is where there is a set of three lights as traffic lights. Every light is an arrow pointing in a different direction and every arrow has a colour of its own, to show whether traffic flow is permitted or prohibited in that direction.

The major disadvantage of this system of traffic light is that it is unfamiliar to those who are used to seeing specific colours of the traffic lights at the various ends of a normal traffic light itself (e.g. green rightmost, red leftmost, etc.) as well is being problematic for the color blind (although by Chinese traffic laws, people who are color blind are not permitted to drive). It does, however, conserve space. The other disadvantage of it is it does not have indication of when a turn can be made without yielding and when the turn can made only after yielding to the oncoming traffic. Although by Chinese traffic laws, turning is always supposed to be made after yielding to oncoming traffic.

Elsewhere in China, a blinking green light means "reduce speed now", attempting to stop cars from passing (if that car can still safely stop in time) and is nearly universal in appearance. Some cities or parts of cities show the number of seconds remaining in a specific traffic light colour (a so-called "countdown meter").

Another type of signal that can be found in China is the Unilight signal that displays all three colours in one signal section.

Installation of this signal outside of China is banned by the Vienna Convention on Road Signs and Signals. The European Annex also even contains an explicit ban on it; so installation of multi-coloured aspects as traffic signals is prohibited.

=== Middle Section Lights ===
In the UK, at Aylesford near Maidstone, a set of middle section lights exist for traffic entering from their home driveways, as these are located on the narrow road between the traffic lights. Each light has a no left turn and a no right turn sign, which light up to indicate to driver where not to turn so the car does not turn into oncoming traffic. When no traffic on the road is coming, both no turn lights would light up.

=== Guided Busway Lights ===
At a number of guided busways in the UK, where these run alongside the normal roads, a special two white diagonal lines aspect in the shape of an inverted V is used instead of a green aspect. This signal at junctions and pedestrian crossings is used to distinguish the lights from the main traffic lights, much like the now extinct X-Way Crossing's white cross aspect, as well as letting other traffic know that the movement relates to guided buses only, similar in design to the white lines used on tram signals.

== Ramp meters ==
A ramp meter or metering light is a device, usually a basic traffic light or a two-phase (red and green, no yellow) light, that regulates the flow of traffic entering freeways according to current traffic conditions. They are intended to reduce congestion on the freeway in two ways. One is to ensure that the total flow entering the freeway does not exceed the capacity at a downstream bottleneck. A second is to break up platoons of vehicles entering freeways, ensuring that traffic can merge more easily. Some metered ramps have bypass lanes for high-occupancy vehicles, allowing car-poolers and buses to skip the queue and get directly on the highway. Meters often only operate in rush hour periods.

On some large toll bridges, such as the San Francisco–Oakland Bay Bridge, red/green traffic lights, similar to ramp meters, are used to stagger traffic leading onto the bridge. At the Bay Bridge, about 25 lanes of toll booth traffic are reduced to five lanes of bridge traffic in about 1/2 mile (800 metres). To accomplish this, an overhead red/green traffic light is visible above each lane, several hundred feet beyond the toll plaza. Green is illuminated for two seconds, signalling the first driver in that lane to begin acceleration. Then the signal jumps to red for eight seconds. Using this method, there are always five lanes with a "green" signal, staggered throughout the 25 lanes of traffic.

== Timers at signals ==
Traffic lights are sometimes accompanied by timers that indicate how much longer a certain phase will last. This is especially common for pedestrian crossing lights in high-traffic areas. Although prohibited for vehicular traffic in most countries around the world, timers have been extensively used in Russia, India, Indonesia, Kazakhstan, China, Thailand, Philippines, Cambodia and Vietnam for both pedestrian and vehicular traffic but in Vietnam, they are rarely used for pedestrians. A major disadvantage of this is that timers can only be used when the traffic lights are under fixed-time operation, reducing flexibility. This is because it is otherwise impossible to know for exactly how long the light will be green or red. Countdown timers are also used on Construction lights in countries but only have red light timers in some countries such as Canada

In Canada and the US, most pedestrian signals now have countdown timers in the flashing hand symbol/"Don't Walk" phase. All new installations of pedestrian signals in the US must include a countdown timer, unless the countdown timer is less than seven seconds long, per the 2009 MUTCD. In New York City, however, this is not the case, as only streets that are wide enough will get countdown timers, regardless of the length of the countdown. Countdown pedestrian signals are also used in a few places in London and Manchester, England.

In some cities (such as Newberg, Oregon; Kyiv, Ukraine; Burghausen, Germany and Kraków, Poland) there are signs displaying how fast one has to drive in order to reach the next intersection at the exact time when the light turns green, thus allowing the driver to ease into a green wave.

== See also ==
- Traffic light - The page about traffic lights
- Traffic light control and coordination
