= National Register of Historic Places listings in Marion County, Tennessee =

Location of Marion County in Tennessee

This is a list of the National Register of Historic Places listings in Marion County, Tennessee.

This is intended to be a complete list of the properties and districts on the National Register of Historic Places in Marion County, Tennessee, United States. Latitude and longitude coordinates are provided for many National Register properties and districts; these locations may be seen together in a map.

There are 18 properties and districts listed on the National Register in the county. Another two properties were once listed but has been removed.

Contents: Counties in Tennessee
Anderson – Bedford – Benton – Bledsoe – Blount – Bradley – Campbell – Cannon – Carroll – Carter – Cheatham – Chester – Claiborne – Clay – Cocke – Coffee – Crockett – Cumberland – Davidson – Decatur – DeKalb – Dickson – Dyer – Fayette – Fentress – Franklin – Gibson – Giles – Grainger – Greene – Grundy – Hamblen – Hamilton – Hancock – Hardeman – Hardin – Hawkins – Haywood – Henderson – Henry – Hickman – Houston – Humphreys – Jackson – Jefferson – Johnson – Knox – Lake – Lauderdale – Lawrence – Lewis – Lincoln – Loudon – Macon – Madison – Marion – Marshall – Maury – McMinn – McNairy – Meigs – Monroe – Montgomery – Moore – Morgan – Obion – Overton – Perry – Pickett – Polk – Putnam – Rhea – Roane – Robertson – Rutherford – Scott – Sequatchie – Sevier – Shelby – Smith – Stewart – Sullivan – Sumner – Tipton – Trousdale – Unicoi – Union – Van Buren – Warren – Washington – Wayne – Weakley – White – Williamson – Wilson

This National Park Service list is complete through NPS recent listings posted November 21, 2025.

== Current listings ==
	Name on the Register	Image	Date listed	Location	City or town	Description
1	Big Hill Fire Lookout Tower		June 28, 2021 (#100006708)	1657 Lower Fire Tower Rd. 35°09′29″N 85°39′20″W	Sequatchie vicinity	
2	Christ Episcopal Church and Parish House	Christ Episcopal Church and Parish House	August 22, 1977 (#77001278)	Corner of 3rd and Holly Sts. 35°00′48″N 85°42′26″W	South Pittsburg	
3	Ebenezer Cumberland Presbyterian Church	Ebenezer Cumberland Presbyterian Church	June 15, 2020 (#100004698)	3040 Griffith Hwy. 35°04′26″N 85°33′37″W	Jasper vicinity	
4	First National Bank of South Pittsburg	First National Bank of South Pittsburg	June 24, 1991 (#91000826)	204 W. 3rd St. 35°00′47″N 85°42′22″W	South Pittsburg	Currently South Pittsburg City Hall
5	Hale's Bar Dam Powerhouse	Hale's Bar Dam Powerhouse	November 25, 2008 (#08001111)	1265 Hale's Bar Rd. 35°02′48″N 85°32′14″W	Haletown	
6	Richard Hardy Memorial School	Richard Hardy Memorial School	September 30, 1982 (#82003990)	1620 Hamilton Ave. 34°59′43″N 85°43′14″W	South Pittsburg	Built in 1926; still a public school
7	Kelly's Ferry Road and Cemetery		November 15, 2006 (#06001037)	U.S. Route 41 near Kelly's Ferry Church of God; 35°02′13″N 85°25′33″W	Guild	
8	Ketner's Mill and Bridge	Ketner's Mill and Bridge	November 23, 1977 (#77001279)	East of Victoria on Ketner Mill Rd. and at the Sequatchie River; 35°08′19″N 85°31′08″W	Victoria	
9	Marion Post No. 62	Marion Post No. 62	November 22, 2016 (#16000789)	300 Elm Ave. 35°00′45″N 85°42′23″W	South Pittsburg	Commonly called "American Legion Hall"
10	McKendree Methodist Episcopal Church	McKendree Methodist Episcopal Church	November 21, 1978 (#78002607)	Betsy Pack Dr. 35°04′40″N 85°37′33″W	Jasper	Built in 1875; now home to Faith Baptist Church
11	McNabb Mines		March 26, 2008 (#08000236)	River Canyon Rd. between miles 438 and 439 on the Tennessee River; 35°02′39″N 85°28′00″W	Haletown	
12	Nickajack Hydroelectric Project	Nickajack Hydroelectric Project	August 14, 2017 (#100001472)	3490 TVA Rd. 35°00′15″N 85°37′10″W	Haletown	
13	Primitive Baptist Church of Sweeten's Cove	Primitive Baptist Church of Sweeten's Cove	June 30, 1983 (#83003050)	Sweden Cove Rd. 35°04′15″N 85°46′48″W	South Pittsburg	
14	Putnam-Cumberland Historic District of Richard City		July 25, 1991 (#91000898)	1805-1810 Cumberland and 1805-1812 Putnam Aves. 34°59′41″N 85°43′33″W	South Pittsburg	
15	RyeMabee	RyeMabee	December 22, 1997 (#97001565)	224 E. Main St. 35°14′23″N 85°49′47″W	Monteagle	
16	South Pittsburg Historic District	South Pittsburg Historic District	October 25, 1990 (#90001573)	Roughly bounded by Elm and Walnut Aves. and 2nd and 7th Sts.; also 700-804 Elm Ave. 35°00′42″N 85°42′37″W	South Pittsburg	Second set of addresses represents a boundary increase of July 11, 2001
17	Townsite Historic District of Richard City		July 25, 1991 (#91000897)	402-512 Dixie, 102-106 Lee Hunt, and 2207 Cumberland Aves. 34°59′28″N 85°43′41″W	South Pittsburg	
18	Whitwell Cumberland Presbyterian Church	Whitwell Cumberland Presbyterian Church	November 26, 2018 (#100003156)	876 Main St. 35°12′02″N 85°31′12″W	Whitwell	

== Former listings ==
	Name on the Register	Image	Date listed	Date removed	Location	City or town	Description
1	Cumberland Avenue Bridge		October 28, 1991 (#91001584)	July 13, 2001	Cumberland Ave. over Poplar Springs Branch Creek; 34°59′34″N 85°43′36″W	South Pittsburg	
2	Marion Memorial Bridge	Marion Memorial Bridge	September 6, 2007 (#07000930)	June 28, 2016	U.S. Route 41 at Nickajack Lake; 35°01′39″N 85°32′32″W	Haletown	Demolished in 2012

== See also ==
- List of National Historic Landmarks in Tennessee
- National Register of Historic Places listings in Tennessee
