= National Register of Historic Places listings in Bradley County, Tennessee =

Location of Bradley County in Tennessee

This is a list of the National Register of Historic Places listings in Bradley County, Tennessee.

This is intended to be a complete list of the properties and districts on the National Register of Historic Places in Bradley County, Tennessee, United States. Latitude and longitude coordinates are provided for many National Register properties and districts; these locations may be seen together in a map.

There are 24 properties and districts listed on the National Register in the county.

Contents: Counties in Tennessee
Anderson – Bedford – Benton – Bledsoe – Blount – Bradley – Campbell – Cannon – Carroll – Carter – Cheatham – Chester – Claiborne – Clay – Cocke – Coffee – Crockett – Cumberland – Davidson – Decatur – DeKalb – Dickson – Dyer – Fayette – Fentress – Franklin – Gibson – Giles – Grainger – Greene – Grundy – Hamblen – Hamilton – Hancock – Hardeman – Hardin – Hawkins – Haywood – Henderson – Henry – Hickman – Houston – Humphreys – Jackson – Jefferson – Johnson – Knox – Lake – Lauderdale – Lawrence – Lewis – Lincoln – Loudon – Macon – Madison – Marion – Marshall – Maury – McMinn – McNairy – Meigs – Monroe – Montgomery – Moore – Morgan – Obion – Overton – Perry – Pickett – Polk – Putnam – Rhea – Roane – Robertson – Rutherford – Scott – Sequatchie – Sevier – Shelby – Smith – Stewart – Sullivan – Sumner – Tipton – Trousdale – Unicoi – Union – Van Buren – Warren – Washington – Wayne – Weakley – White – Williamson – Wilson

This National Park Service list is complete through NPS recent listings posted May 2, 2025.

== Current listings ==
	Name on the Register	Image	Date listed	Location	City or town	Description
1	Blue Springs Encampments and Fortifications	Blue Springs Encampments and Fortifications	April 16, 1999 (#99000427)	West of Blue Springs off Lead Mine Valley Rd., SW. 35°05′27″N 84°55′14″W	Cleveland	
2	Broad Street United Methodist Church	Broad Street United Methodist Church	April 5, 1984 (#84003263)	263 Broad St., NW; 35°09′41″N 84°52′33″W	Cleveland	
3	C.C. Card Auto Company Building	C.C. Card Auto Company Building	July 22, 2014 (#14000083)	125 Inman & 162 1st Sts. 35°09′30″N 84°52′27″W	Cleveland	
4	Centenary Avenue Historic District	Centenary Avenue Historic District	April 1, 1993 (#93000172)	Roughly bounded by 8th, Harle, 13th, and Ocoee Sts. 35°10′03″N 84°52′29″W	Cleveland	
5	Charleston Cumberland Presbyterian Church	Charleston Cumberland Presbyterian Church	July 12, 1984 (#84003444)	Railroad St. 35°17′05″N 84°45′14″W	Charleston	
6	Cleveland Commercial Historic District	Cleveland Commercial Historic District	May 5, 2017 (#16000115)	Roughly bounded by 50-100 blk. of Central Ave., 10-100 blk.of Church & 100 blk. of Inman Sts., 100 blk. of 2nd St., SE. 35°09′35″N 84°52′32″W	Cleveland	
7	Cleveland Southern Railway Depot	Cleveland Southern Railway Depot	March 27, 2008 (#08000235)	175 Edwards St. 35°09′24″N 84°52′23″W	Cleveland	
8	Cleveland to Charleston Concrete Highway	Cleveland to Charleston Concrete Highway	January 10, 2008 (#07001382)	Market and Water Sts. 35°17′14″N 84°45′05″W	Charleston	
9	Hair Conrad Cabin	Hair Conrad Cabin	September 13, 1976 (#76001765)	433 Blythewood Rd., SW. 35°09′47″N 84°54′37″W	Cleveland	
10	Craigmiles Hall	Craigmiles Hall	November 25, 1980 (#80003781)	170 Ocoee St., NE. 35°09′37″N 84°52′30″W	Cleveland	
11	P.M. Craigmiles House	P.M. Craigmiles House	November 20, 1975 (#75001733)	833 Ocoee St., NW. 35°09′52″N 84°52′23″W	Cleveland	
12	Fillauer Brothers Building	Fillauer Brothers Building	June 28, 1989 (#89000507)	Broad and 1st Sts. 35°09′35″N 84°52′34″W	Cleveland	
13	First Presbyterian Church	First Presbyterian Church	March 13, 1986 (#86000396)	433 Ocoee St., NW. 35°09′44″N 84°52′27″W	Cleveland	
14	Hardwick Woolen Mills	Hardwick Woolen Mills	April 12, 2001 (#01000380)	445 Church St., SE. 35°09′21″N 84°52′38″W	Cleveland	
15	Hardwick Farms	Hardwick Farms	November 27, 2019 (#100004696)	4710 N. Lee Hwy. 35°12′23″N 84°50′23″W	Cleveland	
16	Henegar House	Henegar House	July 6, 1976 (#76001764)	458 Market St. 35°17′12″N 84°45′17″W	Charleston	
17	W.J. Hughes Business House	W.J. Hughes Business House	June 10, 1975 (#75001735)	70 Ocoee St. 35°09′34″N 84°52′33″W	Cleveland	
18	Ocoee Street Historic District	Ocoee Street Historic District	December 13, 1995 (#95001447)	1455-1981 N. Ocoee St. 35°10′12″N 84°52′16″W	Cleveland	
19	Rattlesnake Springs	Rattlesnake Springs	September 5, 1975 (#75001734)	Northeast of Cleveland off Dry Valley Rd. 35°14′40″N 84°46′22″W	Cleveland	
20	Red Clay Council Ground	Red Clay Council Ground	September 14, 1972 (#72001229)	13 miles south of Cleveland on Blue Springs Rd. 34°59′31″N 84°56′54″W	Cleveland	Meeting ground for the Cherokee prior to the Cherokee Removal; now a state park
21	St. Luke's Episcopal Church	St. Luke's Episcopal Church	April 12, 1982 (#82003954)	Ocoee and Central Sts., NW. 35°09′40″N 84°52′29″W	Cleveland	
22	Sanda Hosiery Mills	Sanda Hosiery Mills	March 26, 2018 (#100002258)	130-140 Edwards St. 35°09′28″N 84°52′20″W	Cleveland	
23	Tipton-Fillauer House	Tipton-Fillauer House	December 8, 1980 (#80003782)	63 Broad St., NW. 35°09′36″N 84°52′36″W	Cleveland	
24	U.S. Post Office	U.S. Post Office	June 30, 1983 (#83003023)	155 Broad St., NW. 35°09′38″N 84°52′36″W	Cleveland	

== See also ==
- List of National Historic Landmarks in Tennessee
- National Register of Historic Places listings in Tennessee
