= National Register of Historic Places listings in Stewart County, Tennessee =

Location of Stewart County in Tennessee

This is a list of the National Register of Historic Places listings in Stewart County, Tennessee.

This is intended to be a complete list of the properties and districts on the National Register of Historic Places in Stewart County, Tennessee, United States. Latitude and longitude coordinates are provided for many National Register properties and districts; these locations may be seen together in a map.

There are 16 properties and districts listed on the National Register in the county. Ten of these are the ruins of iron furnaces. In the 19th century, Stewart County was a major center for iron mining and production. Production of iron in the county began some time shortly before 1828 and continued until 1927, when the last blast furnace shut down. All of the county's iron furnaces were "stone stack" cold-blast furnaces that used charcoal obtained from burning timber from local forests.

Contents: Counties in Tennessee
Anderson – Bedford – Benton – Bledsoe – Blount – Bradley – Campbell – Cannon – Carroll – Carter – Cheatham – Chester – Claiborne – Clay – Cocke – Coffee – Crockett – Cumberland – Davidson – Decatur – DeKalb – Dickson – Dyer – Fayette – Fentress – Franklin – Gibson – Giles – Grainger – Greene – Grundy – Hamblen – Hamilton – Hancock – Hardeman – Hardin – Hawkins – Haywood – Henderson – Henry – Hickman – Houston – Humphreys – Jackson – Jefferson – Johnson – Knox – Lake – Lauderdale – Lawrence – Lewis – Lincoln – Loudon – Macon – Madison – Marion – Marshall – Maury – McMinn – McNairy – Meigs – Monroe – Montgomery – Moore – Morgan – Obion – Overton – Perry – Pickett – Polk – Putnam – Rhea – Roane – Robertson – Rutherford – Scott – Sequatchie – Sevier – Shelby – Smith – Stewart – Sullivan – Sumner – Tipton – Trousdale – Unicoi – Union – Van Buren – Warren – Washington – Wayne – Weakley – White – Williamson – Wilson

This National Park Service list is complete through NPS recent listings posted December 12, 2025.

== Current listings ==
	Name on the Register	Image	Date listed	Location	City or town	Description
1	Bear Spring Furnace (40SW207)	Bear Spring Furnace (40SW207)	April 9, 1988 (#88000259)	Address Restricted; 36°28′33″N 87°45′10″W	Dover vicinity	
2	Bellwood Furnace (40SW210)		April 21, 1988 (#88000382)	Address Restricted	Bumpus Mills	
3	Brunsoni Furnace (40SW219)		April 11, 1988 (#88000255)	Address Restricted	Cumberland City	
4	Clark Furnace (40SW212)	Clark Furnace (40SW212)	April 11, 1988 (#88000249)	Address Restricted	Standing Rock	
5	Cross Creek Furnace (40SW217)		April 11, 1988 (#88000256)	Address Restricted	Indian Mound	
6	Dover Flint Quarries		May 7, 1973 (#73001833)	Address Restricted	Dover	
7	Eclipse Furnace (40SW213)	Eclipse Furnace (40SW213)	April 11, 1988 (#88000260)	Address Restricted	McKinnon	
8	Fort Donelson National Battlefield	Fort Donelson National Battlefield	October 15, 1966 (#66000076)	1 mile west of Dover on U.S. Route 79; 36°29′14″N 87°51′07″W	Dover	
9	Fort Henry Site	Fort Henry Site	October 10, 1975 (#75001789)	Northwest of Dover off U.S. Route 79 on Fort Henry Rd. 36°30′20″N 88°01′45″W	Dover vicinity	
10	Great Western Furnace	Great Western Furnace	October 6, 1975 (#75001790)	Northwest of Dover on State Route 49; 36°38′24″N 87°58′32″W	Dover vicinity	
11	Henry Hollister House		April 9, 1988 (#88000262)	Chapel Ridge Rd. 36°22′56″N 87°40′28″W	Cumberland City vicinity	
12	LaGrange Furnace (40SW214)	LaGrange Furnace (40SW214)	April 21, 1988 (#88000383)	Address Restricted	McKinnon	
13	Maple Grove Farm	Maple Grove Farm	January 31, 2019 (#100003157)	544 Long Creek Rd. 36°26′50″N 87°48′09″W	Dover vicinity	Historic Family Farms in Middle Tennessee MPS
14	Rough and Ready Furnace (40SW215)		April 9, 1988 (#88000251)	Address Restricted	Cumberland City	
15	Saline Furnace (40SW218)		April 9, 1988 (#88000258)	Address Restricted	Bumpus Mills	
16	Samuel Stacker House		April 11, 1988 (#88000257)	345 Long Creek Rd; 36°27′39″N 87°47′42″W	Dover vicinity	

== See also ==
- List of National Historic Landmarks in Tennessee
- National Register of Historic Places listings in Tennessee
