= Maple Grove Farm =

Maple Grove Farm may refer to:

- Maple Grove Farm (Middletown, Delaware), former farm, formerly listed on the National Register of Historic Places (NRHP) in New Castle County
- Maple Grove Farm (Dover, Tennessee), listed on the NRHP in Stewart County
