= Broad Street United Methodist Church =

Broad Street United Methodist Church may refer to:

- Broad Street United Methodist Church (Columbus, Ohio), listed on the National Register of Historic Places (NRHP)
- Broad Street United Methodist Church (Cleveland, Tennessee), also NRHP-listed
