= P.M. Craigmiles House =

Historic house in Tennessee, US

- P. M. Craigmiles House
- U.S. National Register of Historic Places
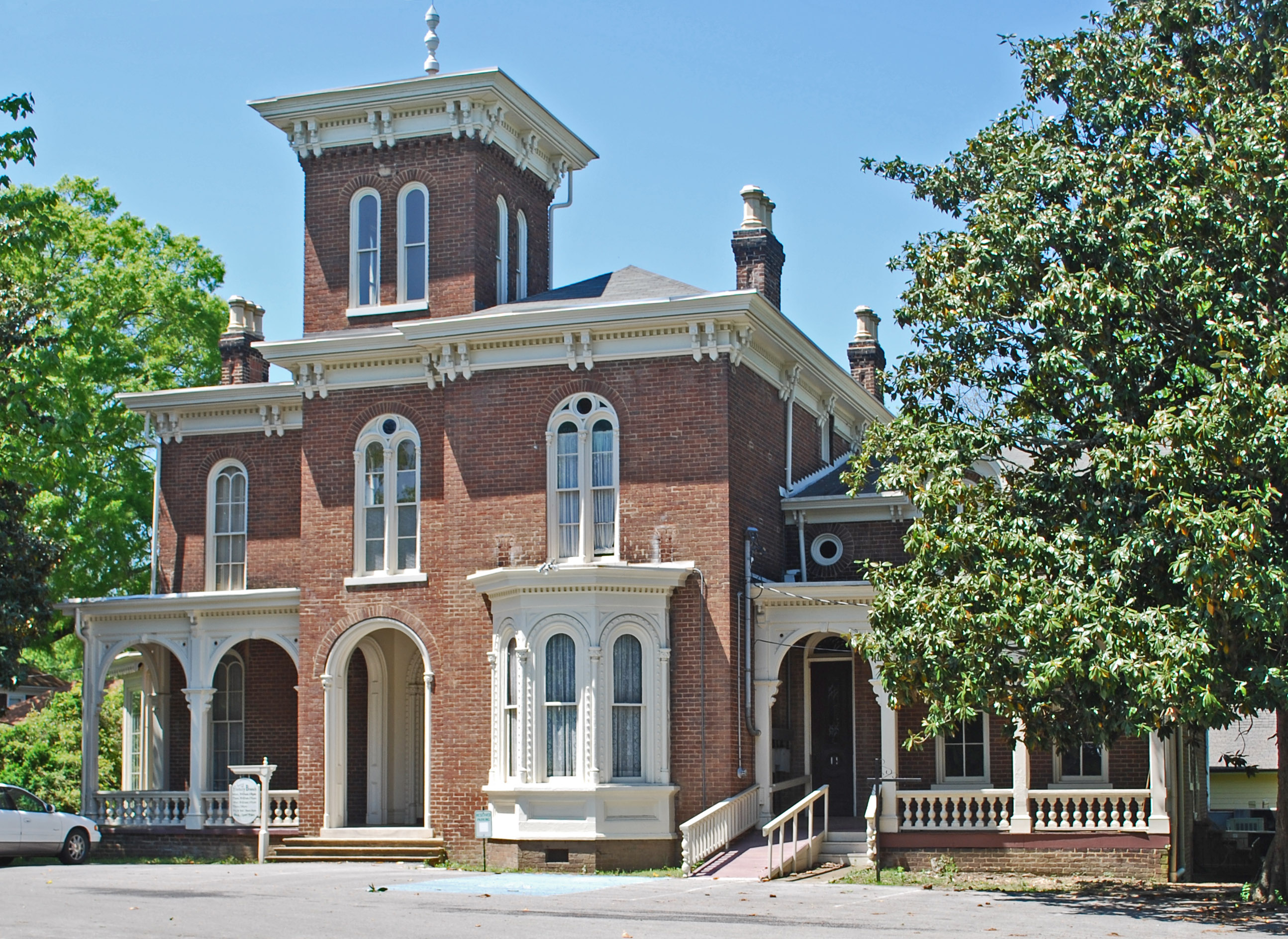

- Location within Tennessee Location within the United States
- Location: 833 Ocoee Street, NW, Cleveland, Tennessee
- Coordinates: 35°09′20″N 84°52′43″W
- Area: 1 acre (0.40 ha)
- Built: 1866
- Architectural style: Italianate
- NRHP reference No.: 75001733
- Added to NRHP: November 20, 1975

The P.M. Craigmiles House is a historic house in Cleveland, Tennessee, U.S.. It was built in 1866 for Pleasant Craigmiles, a businessman. His son Walter built an opera house in Cleveland called Craigmiles Hall. The house later became a public library.

The house was designed in the Italianate architectural style. It has been listed on the National Register of Historic Places since November 20, 1975.
