= Cleveland Commercial Historic District =

Historic district in Cleveland, Tennessee

- U.S. National Register of Historic Places
- U.S. Historic district
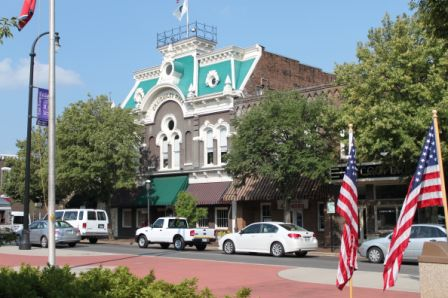
- Downtown Ocoee Street including Craigmiles Hall

- Location within Tennessee Location within the United States
- Nearest city: Cleveland, Tennessee
- Coordinates: 35°09′35″N 84°52′32″W
- NRHP reference No.: 16000115
- Added to NRHP: May 5, 2017

The Cleveland Commercial Historic District is a historic district located in the central business district of Cleveland, Tennessee. It was listed on the National Register of Historic Places (NRHP) in 2017.

== Description ==
The area referred to as the "Cleveland Commercial Historic District" coexists with the area often referred to as "Downtown Cleveland," and was historically the primary social, commercial, and governmental area of Cleveland and Bradley County. The NRHP listings describes the district as being "Roughly bounded by 50-100 block of Central Ave., 10-100 block of Church & 100 block of Inman Sts., 100 block of 2nd St., SE." The district includes a total of 65 structures, mostly built between the 1850s and 1960s. Architectural styles include Second Empire, Italianate, Classical Revival, and mid-century modern detailing. The district includes many historic structures listed on the NRHP including the Bradley County Courthouse Annex (U.S. Post Office), Broad Street United Methodist Church, St. Luke's Episcopal Church, Fillauer Brothers Building, Craigmiles Hall, and the W.J. Hughes Business House. The district also includes the Bradley County Courthouse, built in 1964, and other government offices of both the city of Cleveland and Bradley County.

The district was listed on the NRHP on May 5, 2017.

== See also ==
- National Register of Historic Places listings in Bradley County, Tennessee
- Centenary Avenue Historic District
- Ocoee Street Historic District
