= Whitwell Cumberland Presbyterian Church =

Historic church in Tennessee, United States

- U.S. National Register of Historic Places
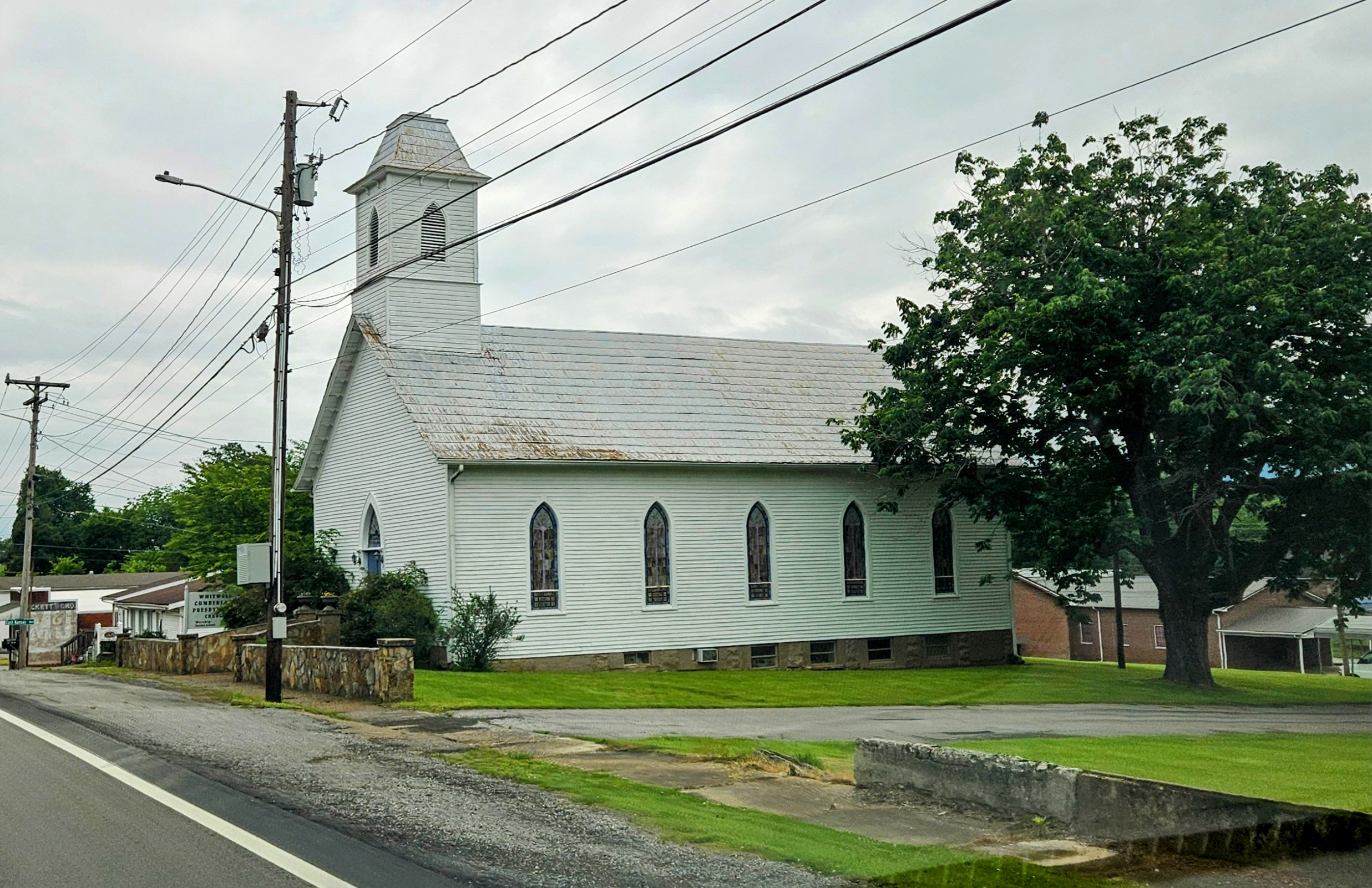
- Whitwell Cumberland Presbyterian Church, May 25, 2025
- Location: 876 South Main Street, Whitwell, Tennessee
- Coordinates: 35.20046°N 85.51972°W
- Area: 0.39 acres (0.16 ha)
- Built: ca. 1892
- Architectural style: Gothic Revival
- NRHP reference No.: 100003156
- Added to NRHP: November 26, 2018

Whitwell Cumberland Presbyterian Church is a Cumberland Presbyterian congregation in Whitwell, Tennessee. The church is located at 876 S. Main Street, Whitwell, Tennessee, and is listed on the National Register of Historic Places.

== History ==
Organized in 1842 as Cheekville Cumberland Presbyterian, the name was changed to Whitwell Cumberland Presbyterian in 1878, to reflect the renaming of Cheekville to Whitwell. As of 2018, the church shares a pastor with Ebenezer Cumberland Presbyterian Church and Oak Grove Cumberland Presbyterian Church. The church currently has less than 10 members in its congregation and is a part of the Tennessee Georgia Presbytery.

The church and parish house were listed on the National Register of Historic Places in 2018.

== Description ==
Whitwell Cumberland Presbyterian Church is an example of the Gothic Revival architectural style. The gable-front rectangular plan building exhibits a simple execution of the Gothic Revival style and maintains a high degree of integrity with arched windows, weatherboard siding with unique decorative notching in the façade gable field, a central square belfry, roof covered with pressed tin ribbed scalloped shingles and a stone pier foundation. The interior features original wood pews and pulpit, and hardwood floors that have been covered in carpet.
