= Fillauer Brothers Building =

Building in Cleveland, Tennessee

- U.S. National Register of Historic Places
- U.S. Historic district – Contributing property
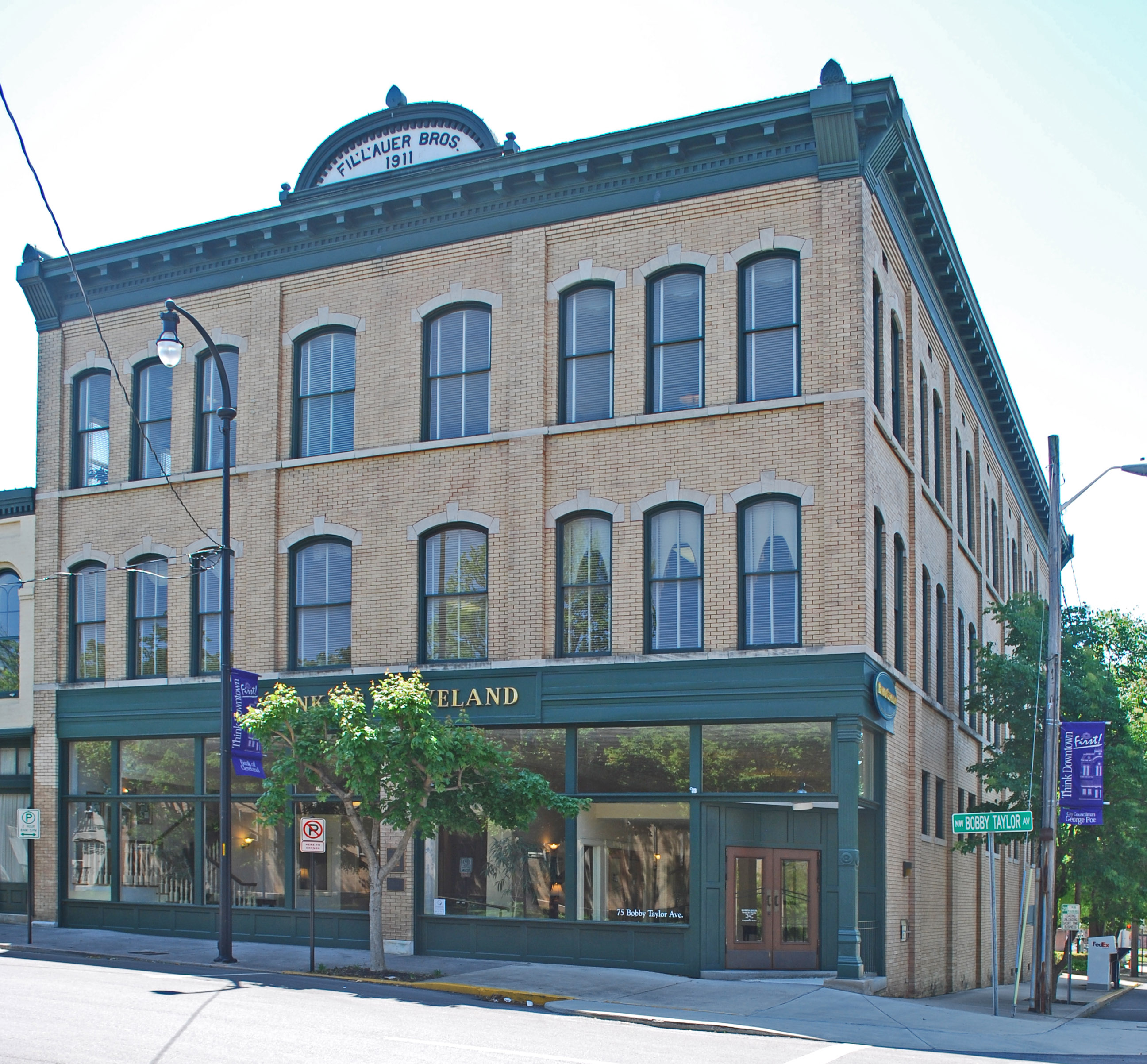
- Fillauer Brothers Building

- Location within Tennessee Location within the United States
- Location: 75 Bobby Taylor Avenue; Cleveland, Tennessee 37311
- Coordinates: 35°09′35″N 84°52′34″W
- Area: less than one acre
- Built: 1911
- Part of: Cleveland Commercial Historic District (ID16000115)
- NRHP reference No.: 89000507

Significant dates
- Added to NRHP: June 28, 1989
- Designated CP: May 5, 2017

The Fillauer Brothers Building is a historic structure in downtown Cleveland, Tennessee, part of the Cleveland Commercial Historic District, built in 1911. It was listed on the National Register of Historic Places (NRHP) in 1989.

== Description and history ==
The building was built in 1911 by brothers John B. and William Fillauer. It consists of three stories with a basement. It originally contained the Moneta theater, a silent movie theater and a hardware store. The building was renovated in 1961. The building was restored to its original condition in 1987, and since then it has housed the Bank of Cleveland. It was listed on the NRHP on June 28, 1989.

== See also ==
- Cleveland Commercial Historic District
- National Register of Historic Places listings in Bradley County, Tennessee
