= RyeMabee =

Historic house in Tennessee, United States

- U.S. National Register of Historic Places
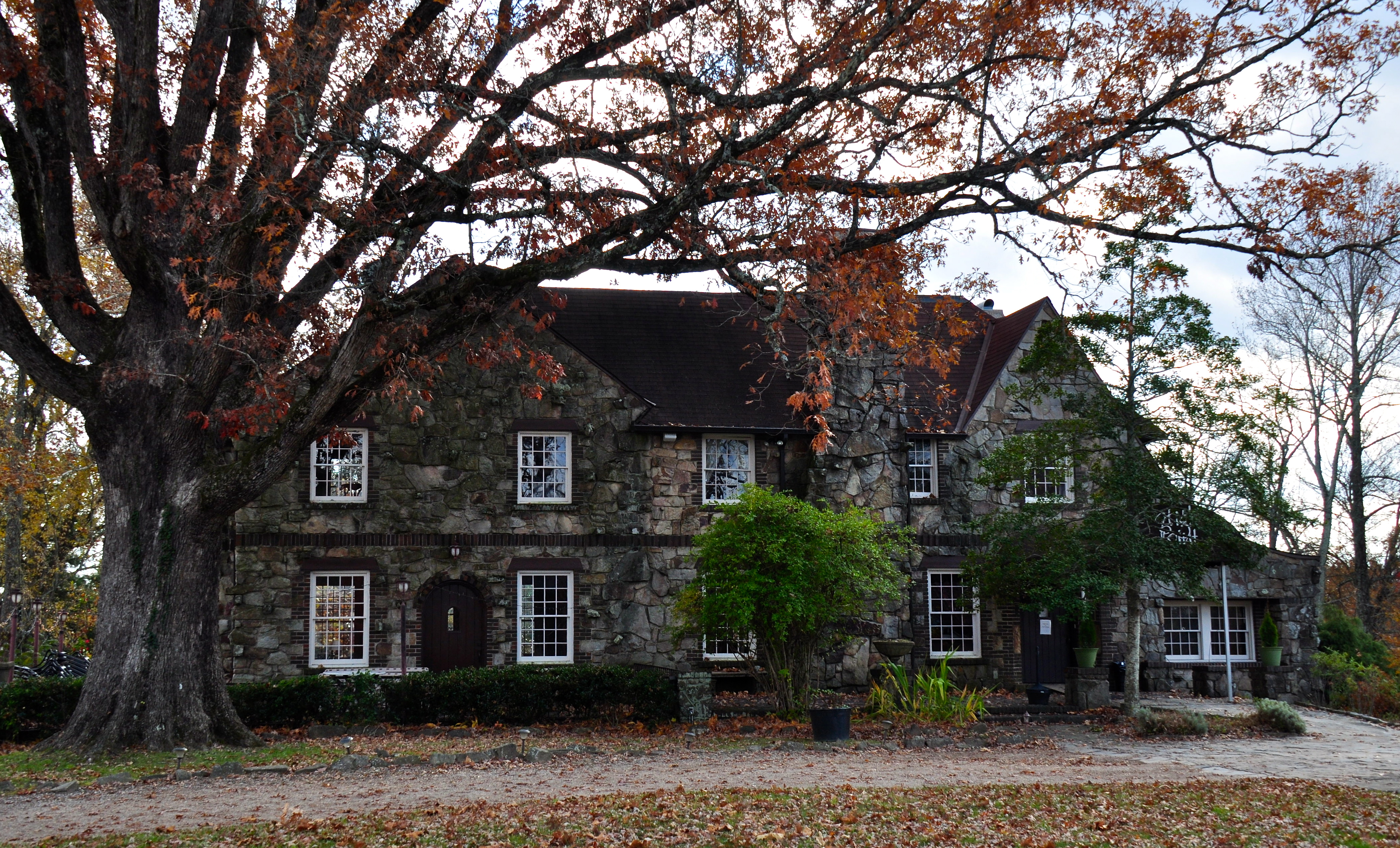
- RyeMabee in 2014

- Location within Tennessee Location within the United States
- Location: 224 East Main Street, Monteagle, Tennessee
- Coordinates: 35°14′23″N 85°49′47″W
- Area: 2.4 acres (0.97 ha)
- Built: 1930
- Architectural style: Tudor Revival
- NRHP reference No.: 97001565
- Added to NRHP: December 22, 1997

RyeMabee, also known as Castlewood, is a historic mansion in Monteagle, Tennessee, U.S.. It was built in 1930 for Irene Mabee Gibson on a former family home. Mobster Al Capone was a frequent visitor "when he was traveling between Chicago and his Florida estate in Miami." It was designed in the Tudor Revival architectural style. It has been listed on the National Register of Historic Places since December 22, 1997.
