= Bradley County Courthouse Annex =

Historic building in Cleveland, Tennessee

- U.S. Post Office
- U.S. National Register of Historic Places
- U.S. Historic district – Contributing property
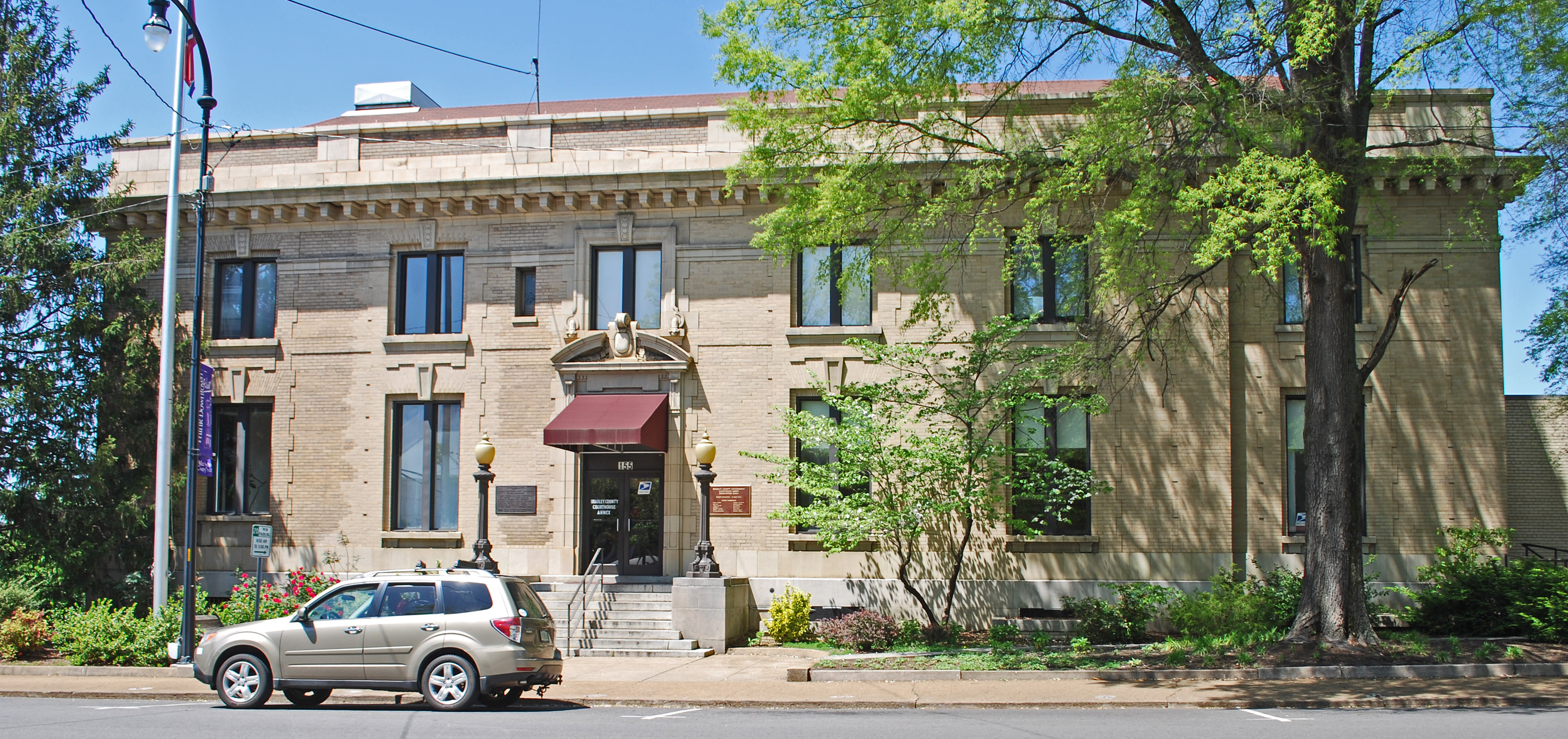
- Bradley County Courthouse Annex

- Location within Tennessee Location within the United States
- Location: 155 Broad Street NW, Cleveland, Tennessee
- Coordinates: 35.1606°N 84.8765°W
- Area: less than one acre
- Built: 1911
- Architect: James Knox Taylor
- Part of: Cleveland Commercial Historic District (ID16000115)
- NRHP reference No.: 83003023

Significant dates
- Added to NRHP: June 30, 1983
- Designated NRHP: May 5, 2007

The Bradley County Courthouse Annex, known in the past as simply the U.S. Post Office or as the Old Main Post Office, is a historic building in downtown Cleveland, Tennessee, built in 1911. It was listed on the National Register of Historic Places (NRHP) in 1983.

== History ==
It was built on the site of a trading place named "Taylor's Place" operated in 1835 by Andrew Taylor, the first white settler to arrive in what is now called Cleveland, Tennessee, and his Indian wife.

The structure, built in 1911, was designed by architect James Knox Taylor, who served as Supervising Architect for the U.S. Department of Treasury at the time. It includes elements of Second Renaissance Revival and Georgian Revival architectural styles: these elements include "its symmetrical rectangular plan, large scale, quoins, massive cornice, and hipped roof with a flat deck."

The building operated as the central headquarters for the Post Office in Bradley County until 1985. Since then it has housed the downtown postal station, with PO boxes and zip code 37364, and additional offices of the County Government, which is why it is known as the Courthouse Annex. It was listed on the NRHP on June 30, 1983, and was still known as the U.S. Post Office at the time. The building was renovated and restored in 2000.

== See also ==
- National Register of Historic Places listings in Bradley County, Tennessee
