= W.J. Hughes Business House =

- W. J. Hughes Business House
- U.S. National Register of Historic Places
- U.S. Historic district – Contributing property
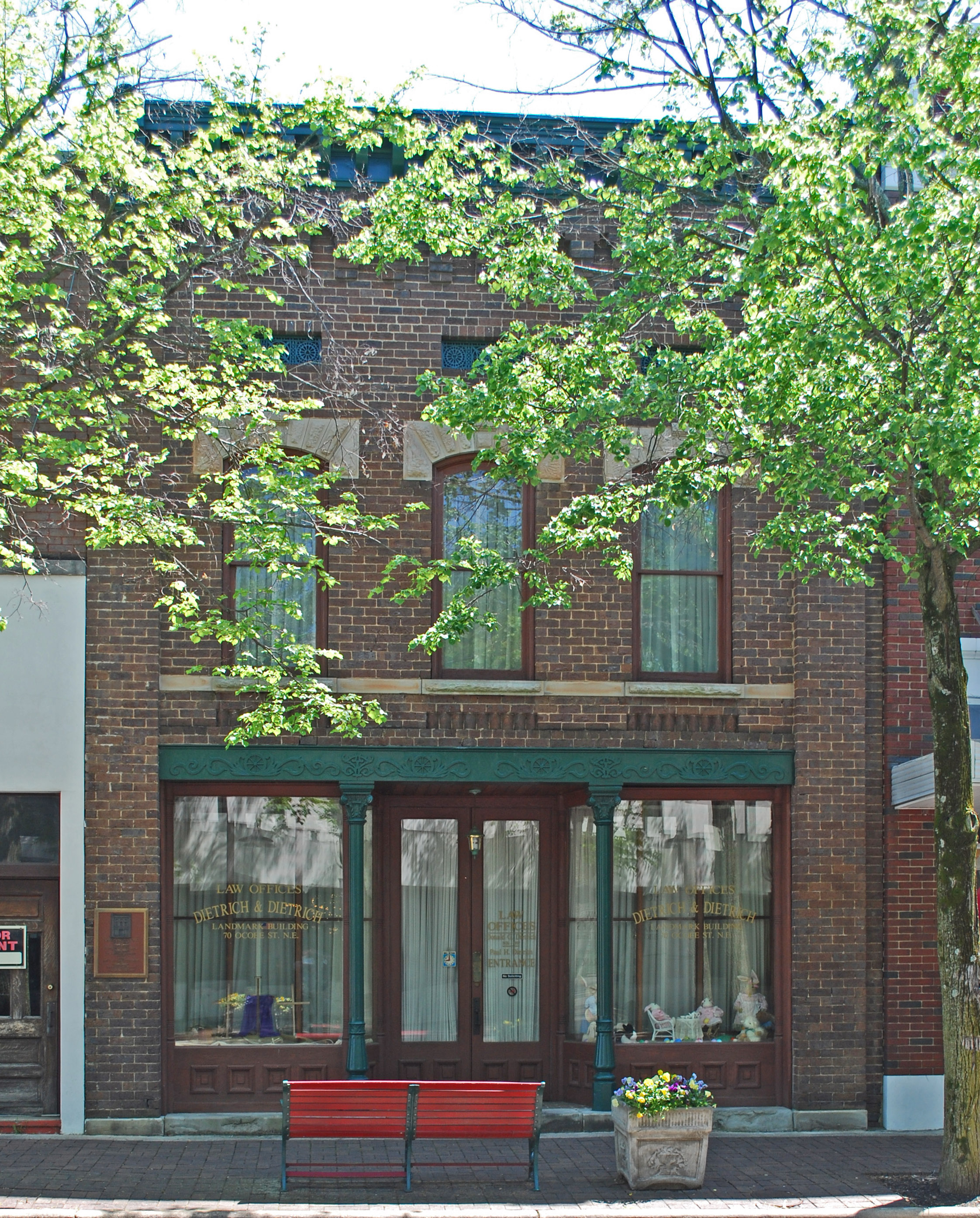

- Location within Tennessee Location within the United States
- Location: 70 Ocoee St., Cleveland, Tennessee
- Coordinates: 35°9′34″N 84°52′33″W
- Area: 0.3 acres (0.12 ha)
- Built: 1845
- Part of: Cleveland Commercial Historic District (ID16000115)
- NRHP reference No.: 75001735

Significant dates
- Added to NRHP: June 10, 1975
- Designated CP: May 5, 2007

W. J. Hughes Business House, also known as C.J. Wilson Store, is located at 70 Ocoee Street in Cleveland, Tennessee, United States. It was listed on the National Register of Historic Places in 1975.

== Description ==
The two-story red brick building was built in the 1840s, not long after the platting of the city of Cleveland in 1838. The building design is described by the Historic American Buildings Survey as having "embellishments" that demonstrate "the civic pride and leadership of J. H. Craigmiles", while otherwise being similar to many small-town commercial buildings of the era. Facing the street there is a one-story, three-bay cast-iron front, estimated to have been added around 1880. It includes a recessed, panelled, double door and a pair of display windows made from plate glass and is topped by a decorative cast-iron architrave. The second-story windows have limestone sills and are topped by segmental arches. Decorative iron work ornaments the vents above the windows. The facade is crowned by a cornice made from stamped tin. Other decorative elements are found in the brick work below the windows and corbelled brick work below the cornice.

== History ==
The building's first recorded owner was William H. Tibbs, who operated a retail store. He sold the building in 1850, but continued to be associated with the building, which housed the Tibbs and Surguine Dry Goods Store as of 1860, when Cleveland was described as "an active business place" with about 20 stores. In subsequent years, Tibbs partnered with W.J. Hughes to operate a store in the building, and Hughes became the sole proprietor after Tibbs died. Around 1890, a saloon operated by F. P. Kelly and J. P. Cooper took the place of the store. One of five saloons in the city, it closed down some time after the city of Cleveland enacted a prohibition ordinance in 1903. The building was later sold to C. J. Wilson, who opened a store there in 1909; his son J. L. Wilson later took over the business. The C.J. and J.L. Wilson Dry Goods store remained in business until J. L. Wilson's circa the early 1970s. As of 1983, the building housed a law office.
