= St. Luke's Episcopal Church (Cleveland, Tennessee) =

Historic church in Tennessee, United States

- Saint Luke's Memorial Episcopal Church
- U.S. National Register of Historic Places
- U.S. Historic district – Contributing property
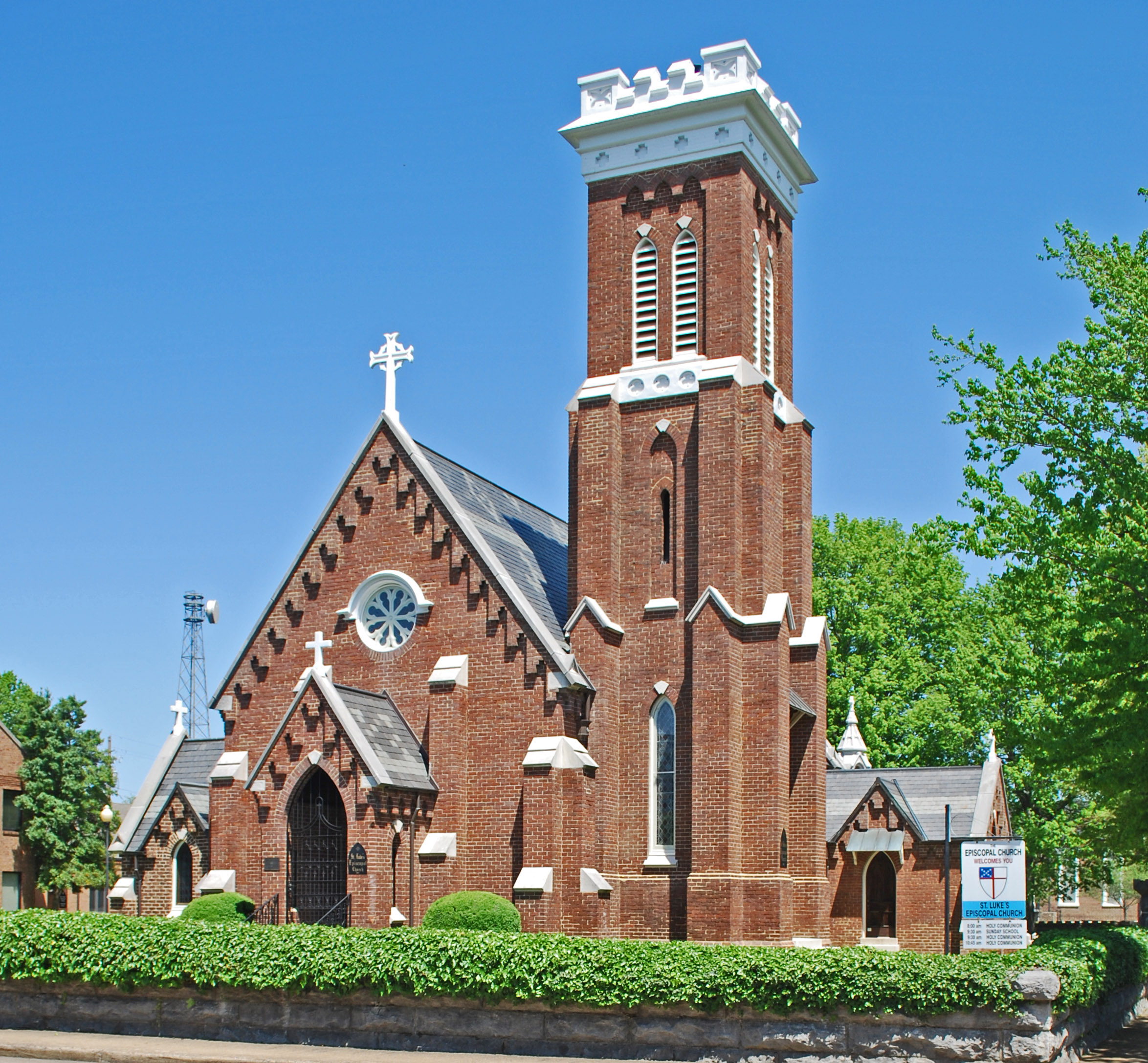

- Location within Tennessee Location within the United States
- Location: Ocoee and Central Sts., NW, Cleveland, Tennessee
- Coordinates: 35°9′40″N 84°52′29″W
- Area: 0.5 acres (0.20 ha)
- Built: 1873
- Architect: Williamson, Peter J.
- Architectural style: Gothic
- Part of: Cleveland Commercial Historic District (ID16000115)
- NRHP reference No.: 82003954

Significant dates
- Added to NRHP: April 12, 1982
- Designated CP: May 5, 2007

St. Luke's Episcopal Church is a historic church at 320 Broad St. NW in Cleveland, Tennessee, United States. It is one of the city's oldest buildings and the second oldest church building in Cleveland.

The Gothic Revival-style church building was built in 1873. It was dedicated to the memory of a 7-year-old girl, Nina Craigmiles, who died on October 18, 1871, when the buggy she was riding in was hit by a railroad switch engine.

The church building features stained glass windows, wooden arches with intricate carvings, and a 3-story bell tower that contains a bell that is rung nine times after the opening voluntary at the beginning of each service, three peals each in honour of The Father, The Son, and The Holy Ghost. In addition to the bell, an electric carillon that plays the Westminster Chimes on the quarter hours. The building was added to the National Register of Historic Places in 1982.
