= Craigmiles Hall =

Historic building in Tennessee, US

- U.S. National Register of Historic Places
- U.S. Historic district – Contributing property
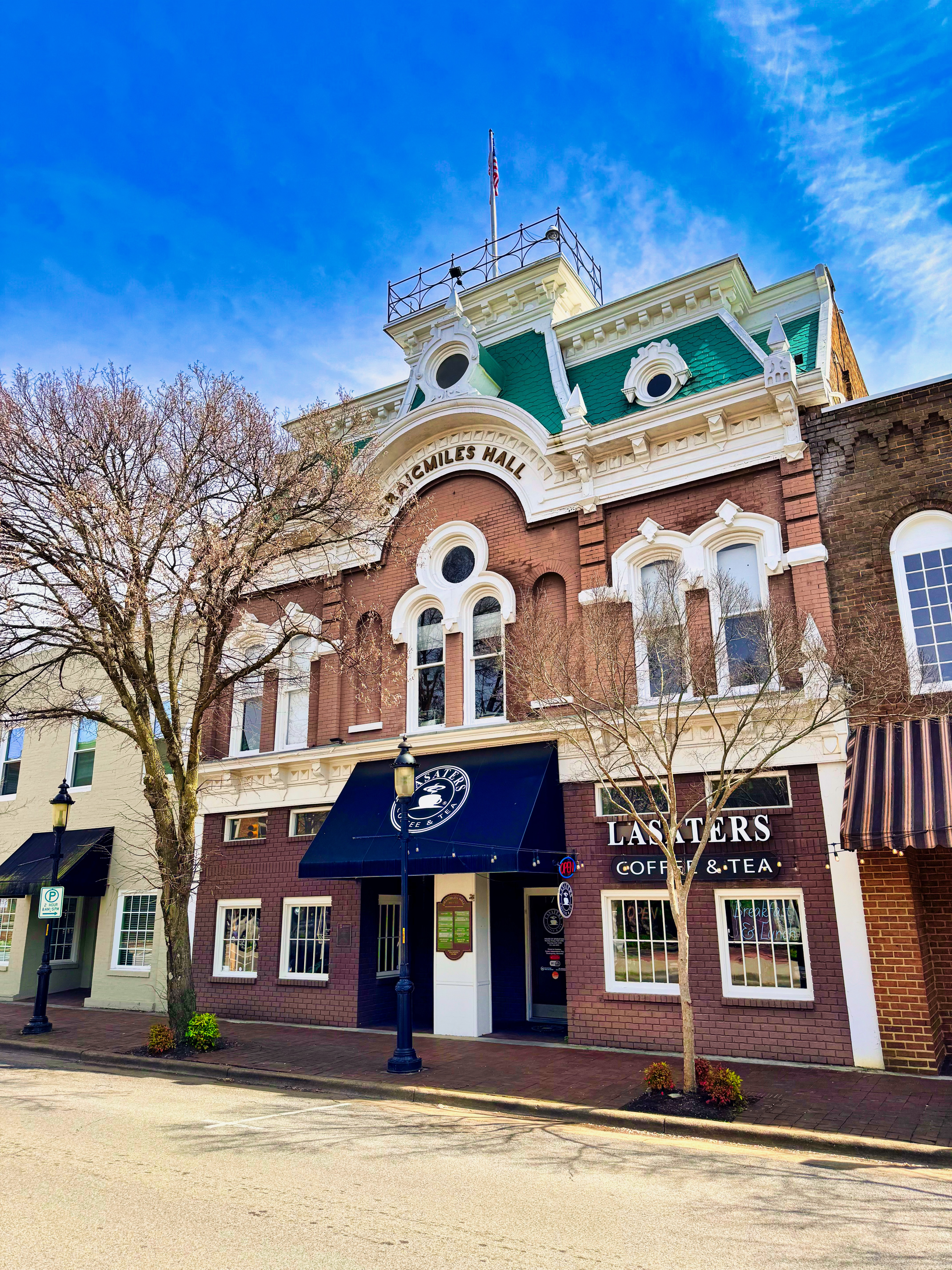

- Location within Tennessee
- Location: 170 Ocoee Street, NE, Cleveland, Tennessee
- Coordinates: 35°09′37″N 84°52′30″W
- Area: less than one acre
- Built: 1877
- Architectural style: Second Empire
- Part of: Cleveland Commercial Historic District (ID16000115)
- NRHP reference No.: 80003781

Significant dates
- Added to NRHP: November 25, 1980
- Designated CP: May 5, 2007

Craigmiles Hall is a historic building in Cleveland, Tennessee, U.S.. It was built as an opera house in 1877–1878. Its construction was commissioned by Walter Craigmiles, who grew up in the P.M. Craigmiles House. It remained in the Craigmiles family until 1896.

In 1896, the building was purchased by J.E. Johnston and a group of investors that included J.T. Johnston, W.P. Lang, May Brown, J.A. Steed, and S.M. Johnston. The property was acquired in 1909 by John and Isa Steed, who added a drugstore to the first floor. A.B. Jones and Vastine Stickley bought Craigmiles Hall in 1948. The building was sold again in 1973 to the Uptown Corporation. Attorney Richard Banks purchased Craigmiles Hall in 1979. The building has been owned by businessman Allan Jones since 1993.

The building was designed in the Second Empire architectural style. It has been listed on the National Register of Historic Places since November 25, 1980.

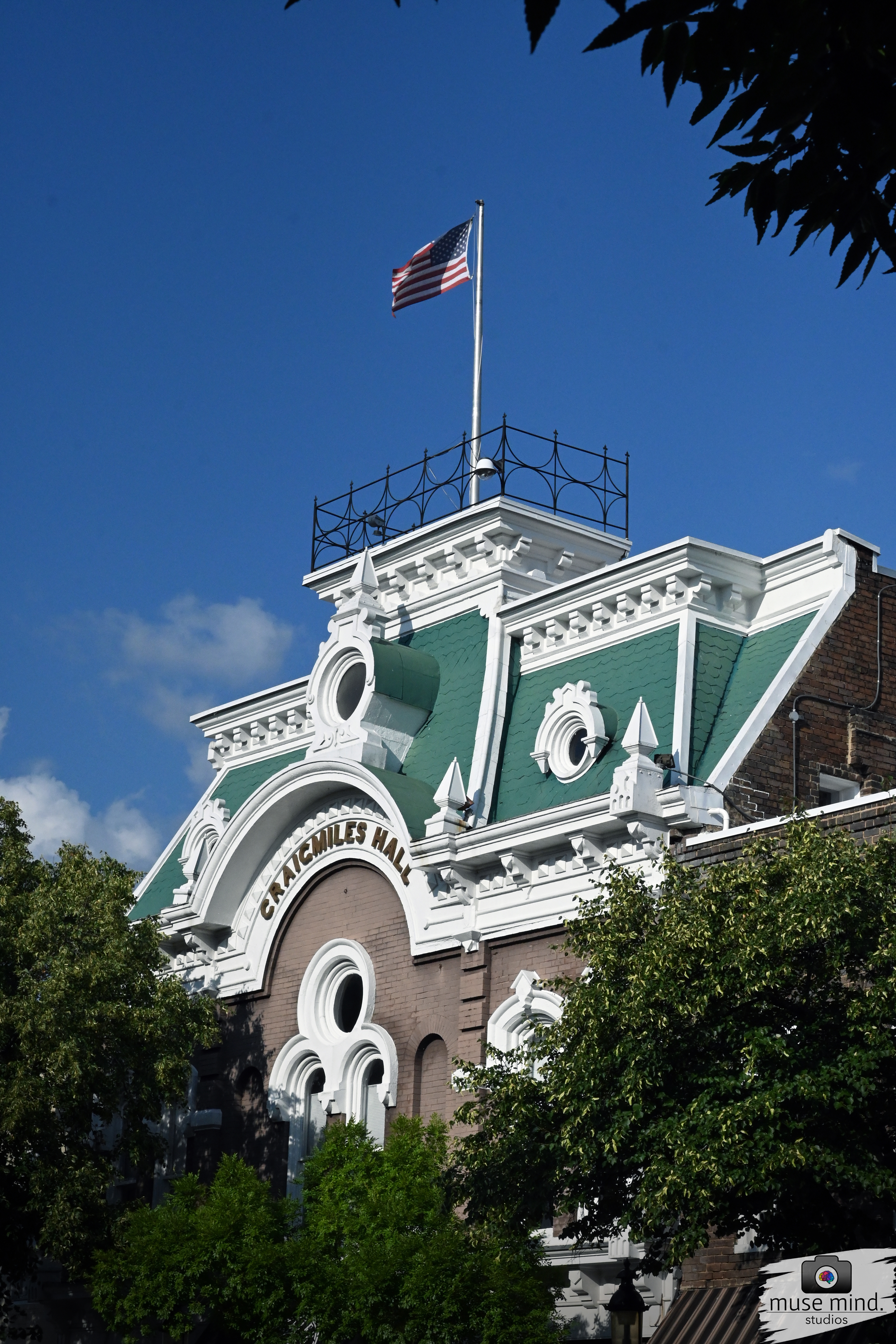
Craigmiles Hall as seen from the Bradley County Courthouse

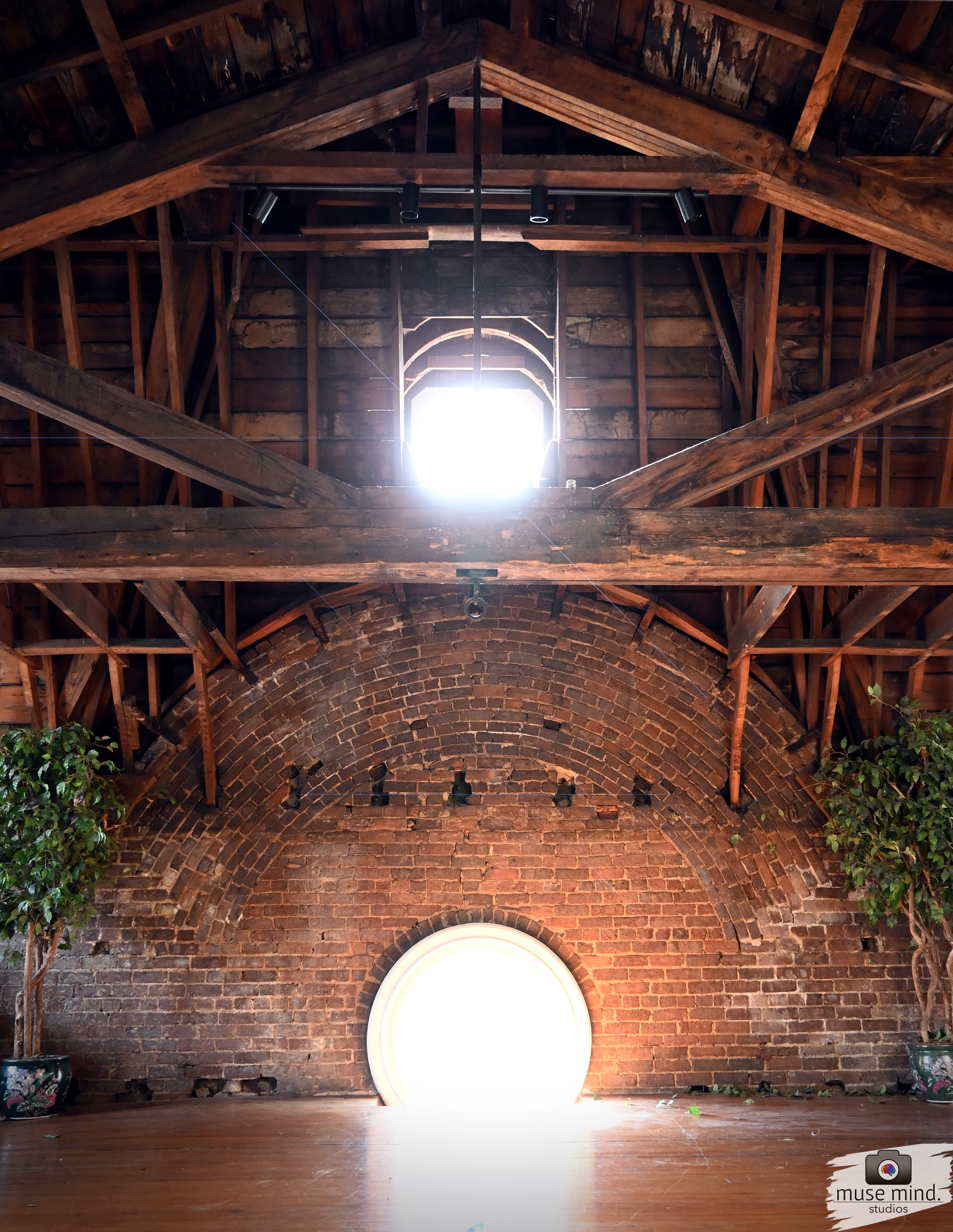
Craigmiles Hall, roof interior, revealing the deep bracketed cornice, and pierced by hooded porthole dormers. Original wood from 1878.

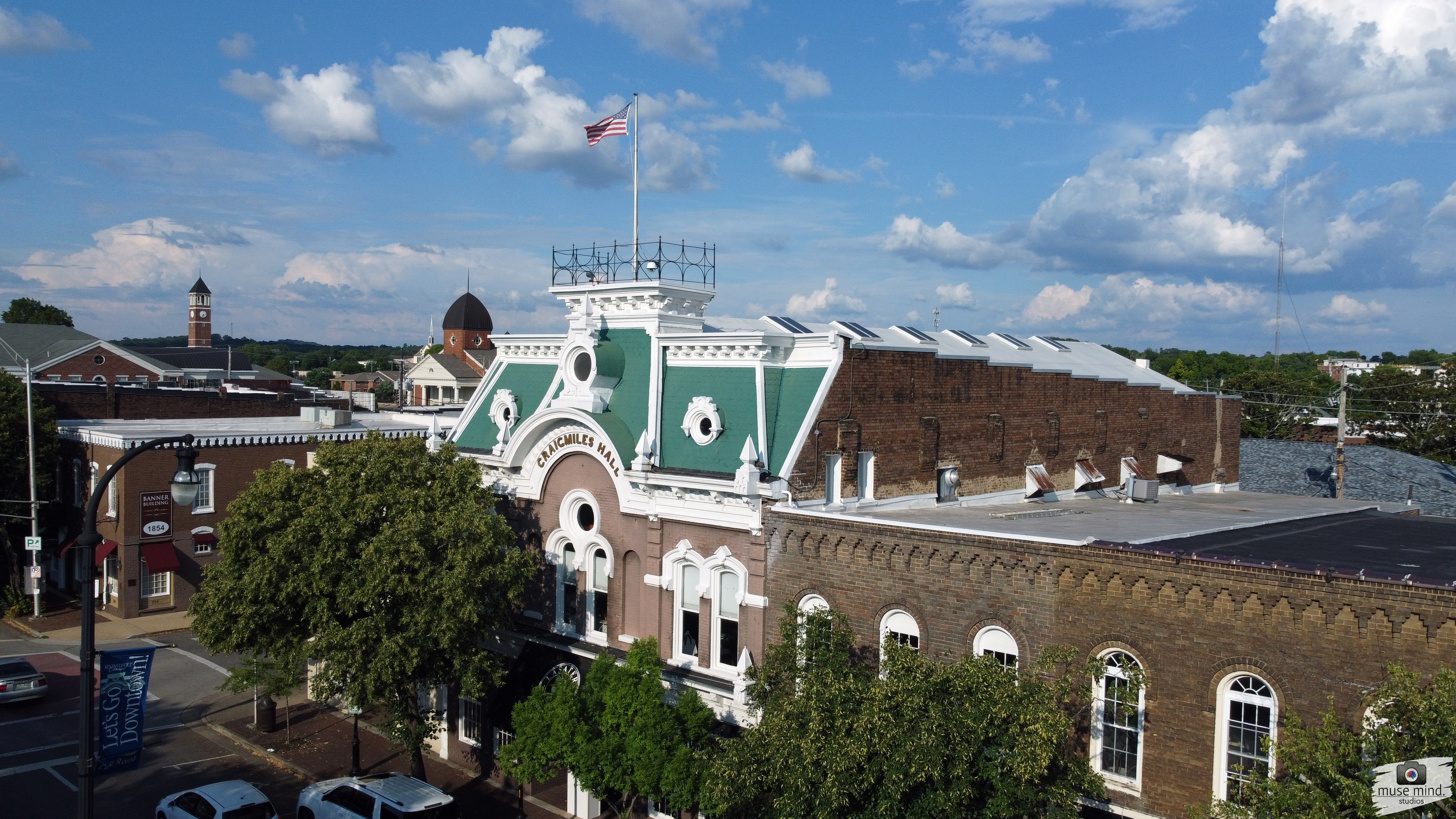
Craigmiles Hall Opera House, as seen by drone - 2022

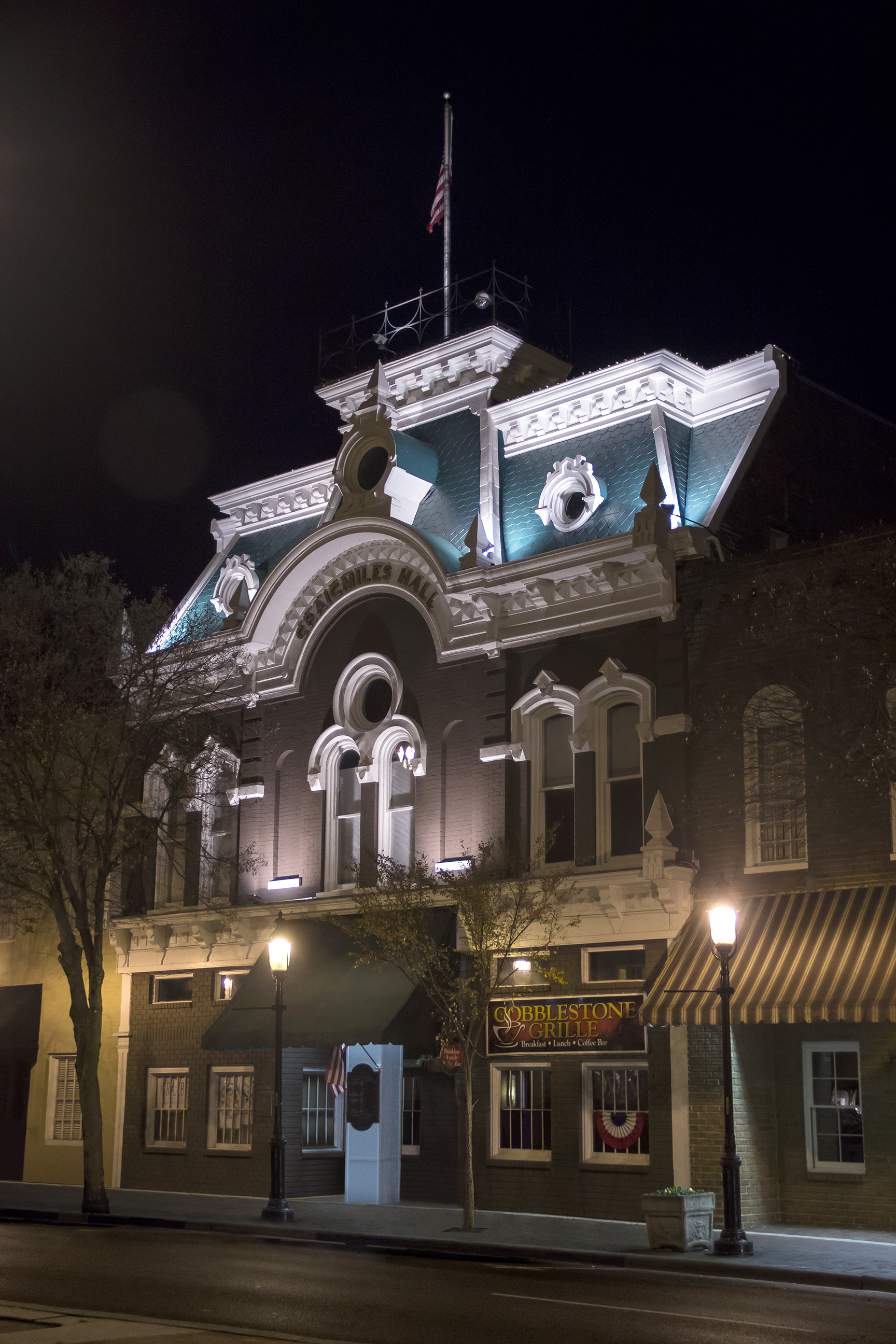
Night time view of Craigmiles Hall

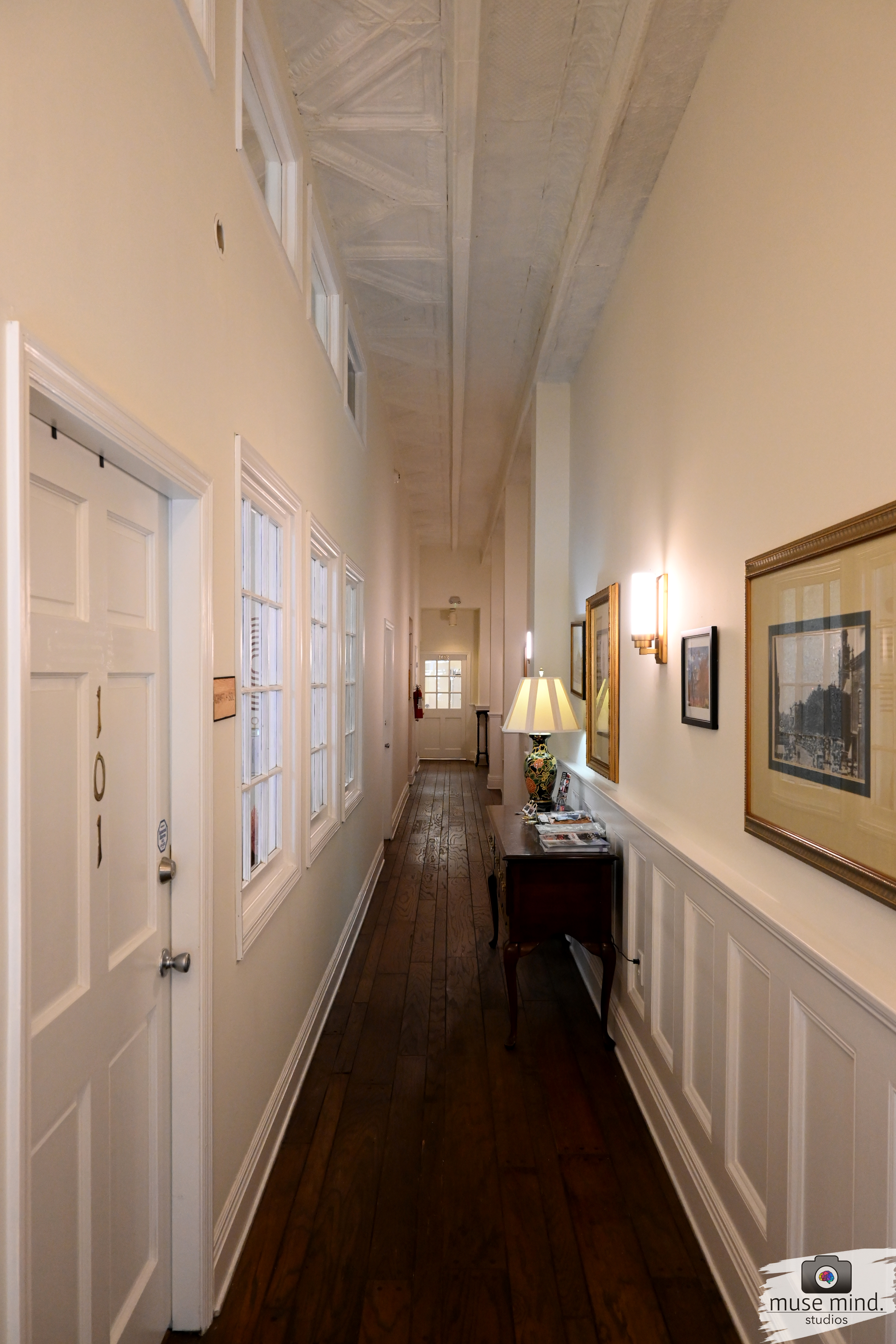
First floor hallway, as seen from entrance of Craigmiles Hall

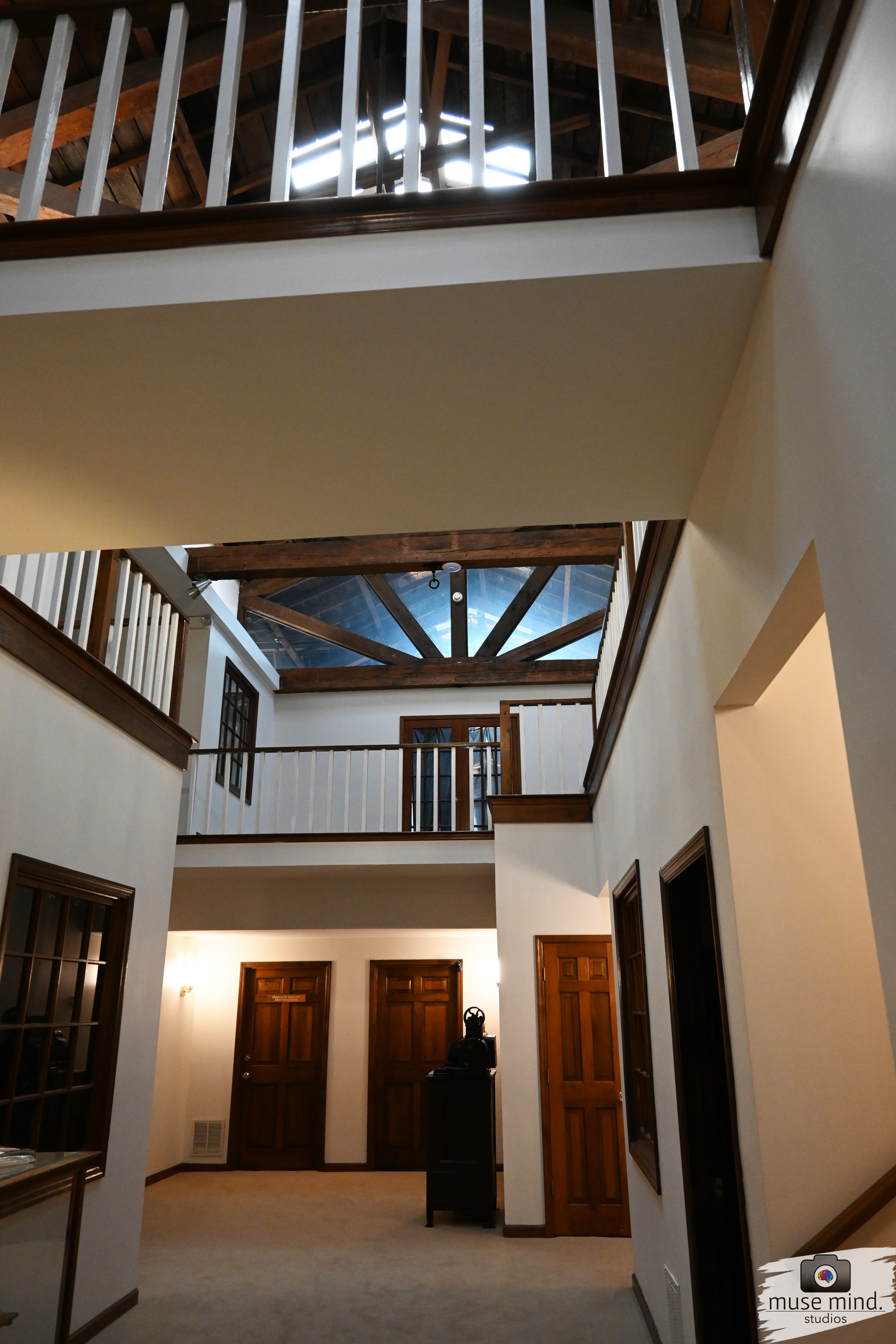
Second floor of Craigmiles Hall, viewing front of building and third floor.

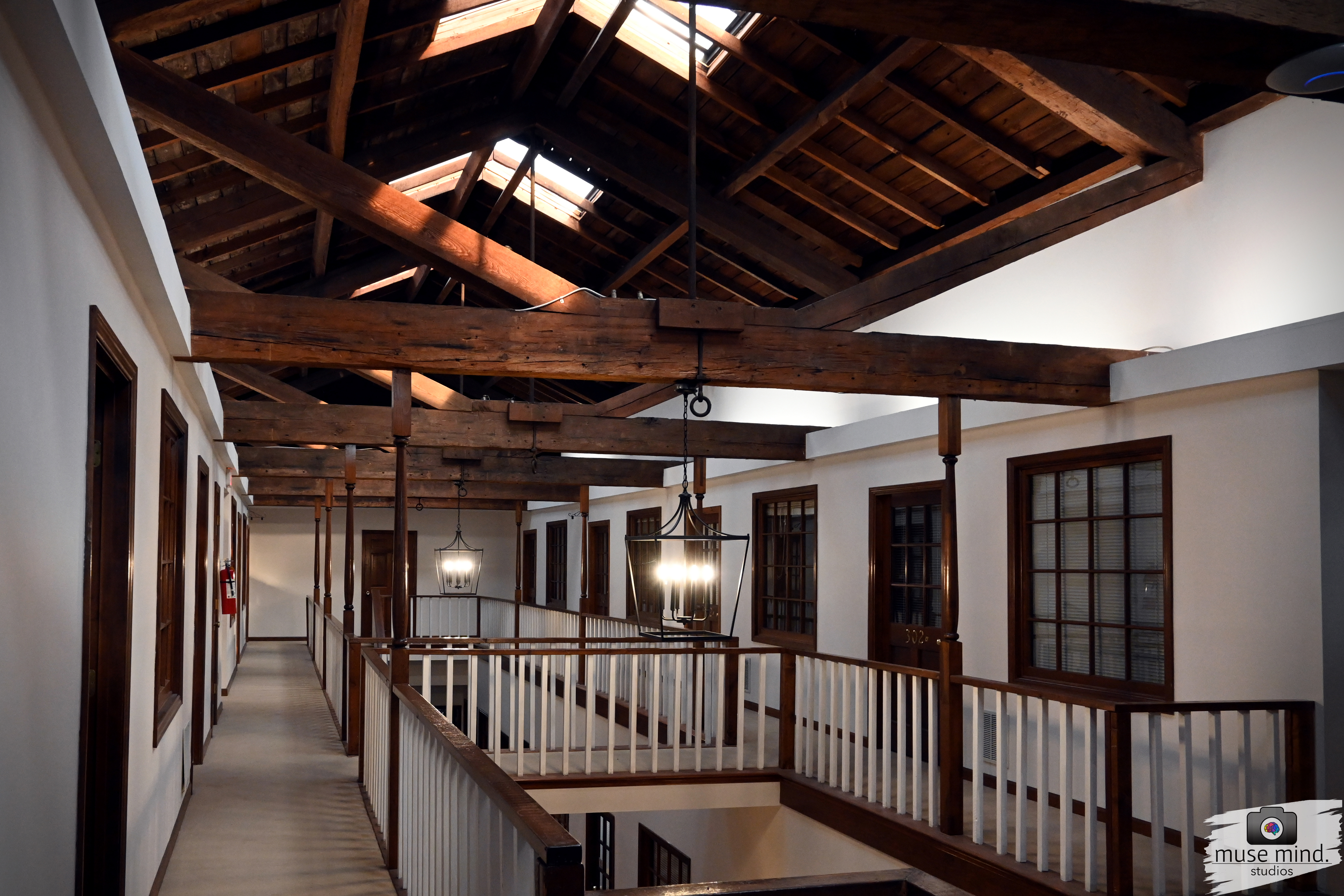
Third floor of Craigmiles Hall, viewing rear of building. Large skylights flood interior with natural light. Original wood from 1878.
