= Maple Grove Farm (Middletown, Delaware) =

Former historic house in Delaware, US

- U.S. National Register of Historic Places
- Location within Delaware Location within the United States
- Location: Delaware Route 299, Middletown, Delaware
- Coordinates: 39.447441°N 75.701928°W
- Area: 1 acre (0.40 ha)
- Built: c. 1840
- Architectural style: Late Victorian, Georgian, Federal
- MPS: Rebuilding St. Georges Hundred 1850-1880 TR
- NRHP reference No.: 85002106
- Added to NRHP: September 13, 1985

Maple Grove Farm was a historic home located at Middletown in New Castle County, Delaware, United States. It was built about 1840, and was a 2 1/2-story, five-by-two bay frame Georgian house with a two-story, frame gabled wing to the east and a two-story kitchen wing to the rear. It featured a full-width front porch supported by Doric order columns. Also on the property was a small stone, stuccoed structure which appears to have been a meathouse.

It was listed on the National Register of Historic Places in 1985 and demolished between 1992 and 2002.
