= Primitive Baptist Church of Sweeten's Cove =

Historic church in Tennessee, United States

- U.S. National Register of Historic Places
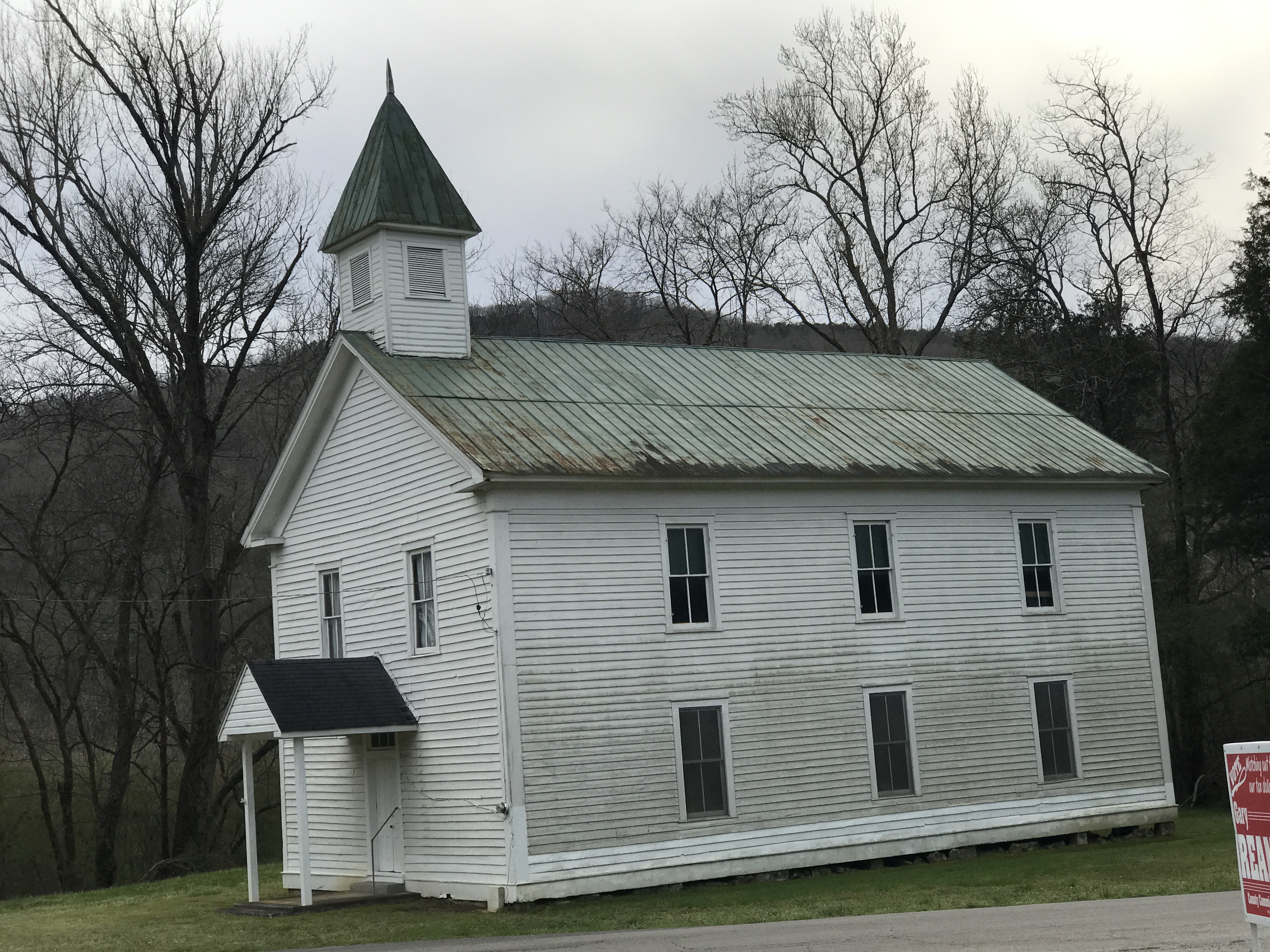

- Location within Tennessee Location within the United States
- Nearest city: South Pittsburg, Tennessee
- Coordinates: 35°4′15″N 85°46′48″W
- Area: 0.6 acres (0.24 ha)
- Built: 1853
- Architectural style: Greek Revival
- NRHP reference No.: 83003050
- Added to NRHP: June 30, 1983

Primitive Baptist Church of Sweeten's Cove is a historic Primitive Baptist church in Marion County, Tennessee, located in the Sweeten's Cove area in the Sequatchie Valley, about 7 miles (11 km) north of South Pittsburg.

Sweeten's Cove, which is identified as Sweeden's Cove in some old maps and documents, was an area of early settlement, primarily by members of the Beene (Bean) and Raulston (Roulston) families. The church was established around 1821 as Union Primitive Baptist Church. It adopted its current name in 1834. The church building was completed in 1853.

On June 4, 1862, Sweeten's Cove was the site of a minor battle between Union Army forces under General James Negley and a Confederate cavalry unit led by Colonel John Adams. Twenty unidentified Confederate soldiers who died in the battle are buried in the Bean-Roulston Cemetery, which is about 0.7 miles (1.1 km) north of the church.

The church was added to the National Register of Historic Places in 1983.
