= Henry Hollister House =

- U.S. National Register of Historic Places
- Location within Tennessee
- Nearest city: Cumberland City, Tennessee
- Coordinates: 36°22′56″N 87°40′28″W
- Area: 5 acres (2.0 ha)
- Built: c.1850
- Architectural style: Greek Revival, Italianate
- MPS: Iron Industry on the Western Highland Rim 1790s--1920s MPS
- NRHP reference No.: 88000262
- Added to NRHP: April 9, 1988

The Henry Hollister House, on Chapel Ridge Rd. near Cumberland City, Tennessee, is a historic house built around 1850. It was listed on the National Register of Historic Places in 1988.

It was deemed significant for its association with Henry Hollister, an ironmaster in Stewart and Houston counties. The house is also "a good example of transitional Greek Revival/Italianate design. Distinguishing features include an unusual combination of common and Flemish bond brick, a bracketed frieze, and paneled wood trim."
