= McKendree Methodist Episcopal Church =

Historic church in Tennessee, United States

- U.S. National Register of Historic Places
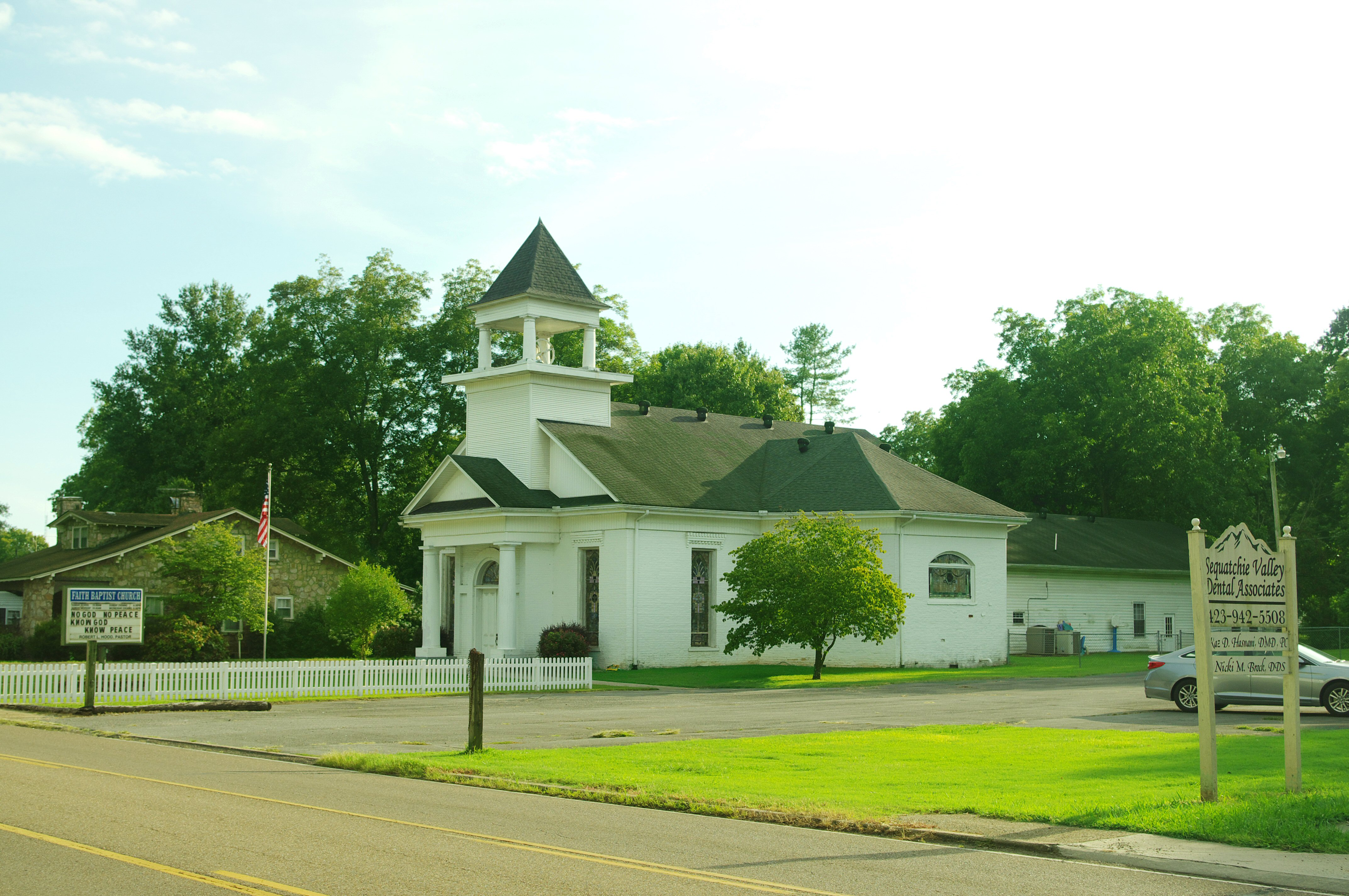

- Location within Tennessee Location within the United States
- Location: Betsy Pack Dr., Jasper, Tennessee
- Coordinates: 35°4′40″N 85°37′33″W
- Area: 0.3 acres (0.12 ha)
- Built: 1875
- NRHP reference No.: 78002607
- Added to NRHP: November 21, 1978

McKendree Methodist Episcopal Church is a historic church building at 503 Betsy Pack Drive in Jasper, Tennessee, that was formerly the home of the McKendree United Methodist Church and is now home to Faith Baptist Church.

It was built in 1875 and added to the National Register of Historic Places in 1978.

McKendree United Methodist Church is now located at 106 Highway 150 in Jasper.
