= Maple Grove Farm (Dover, Tennessee) =

- U.S. National Register of Historic Places
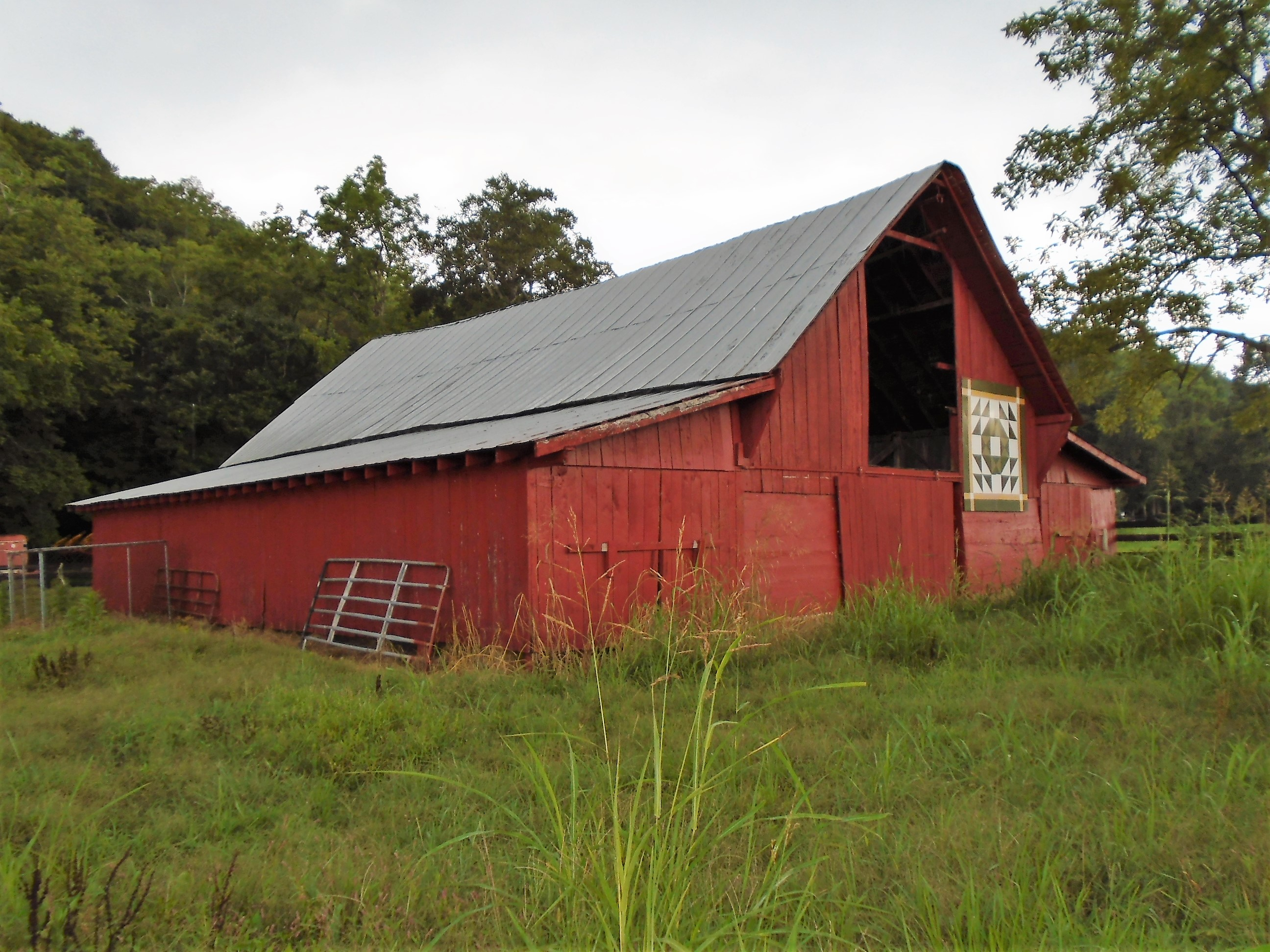

- Location within Tennessee Location within the United States
- Location: Dover, Tennessee
- Coordinates: 36°26′53″N 87°48′11″W
- NRHP reference No.: 100003157
- Added to NRHP: January 31, 2019

Maple Grove Farm (544 Long Creek Road) in Stewart County, Tennessee near Dover, was added to the National Register of Historic Places on January 31, 2019.
