= Broad Street United Methodist Church (Cleveland, Tennessee) =

Historic church in Tennessee, United States

- U.S. National Register of Historic Places
- U.S. Historic district – Contributing property
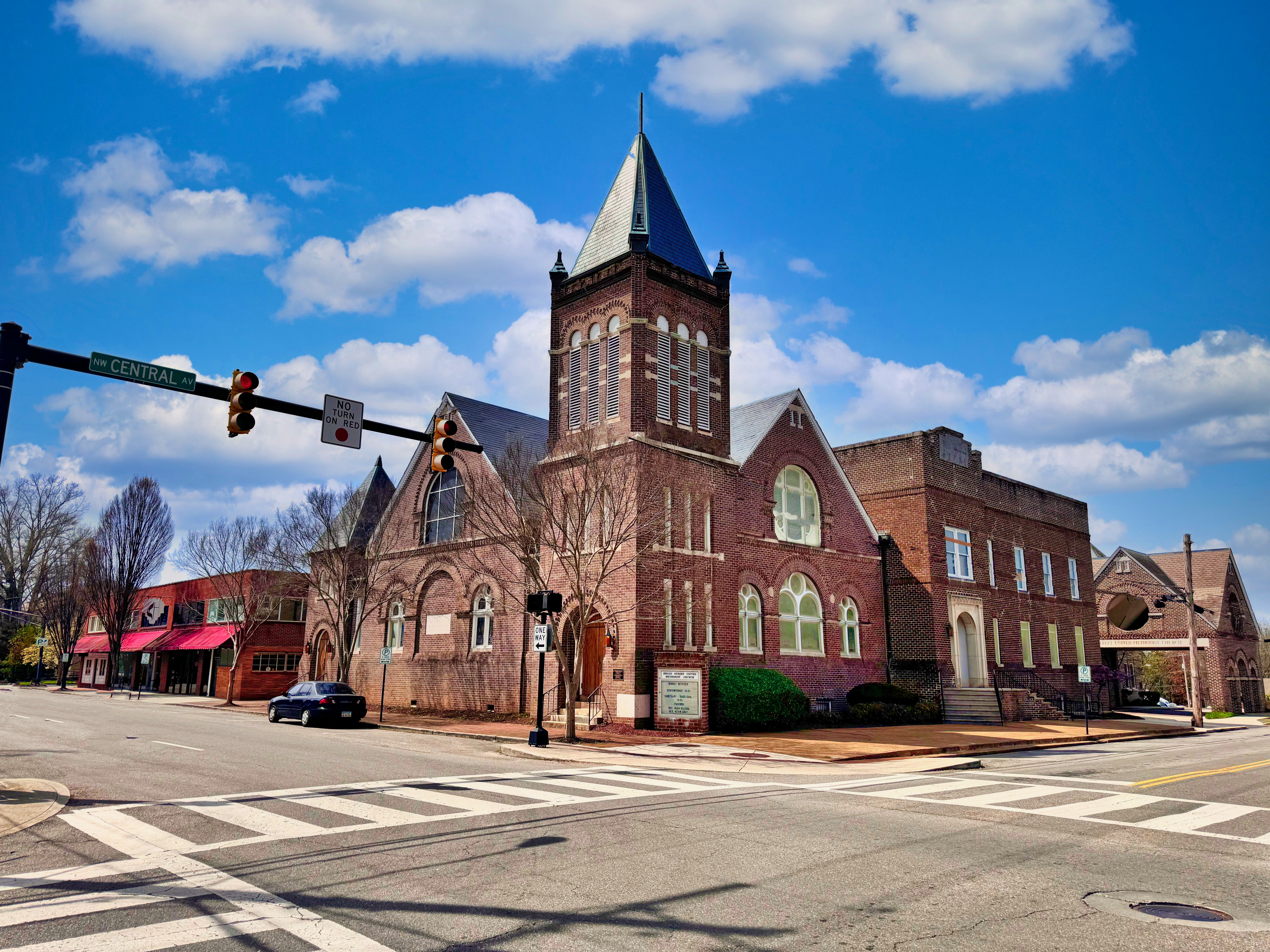

- Location within Tennessee Location within the United States
- Location: 263 Broad St., NW, Cleveland, Tennessee
- Coordinates: 35°9′8″N 84°52′34″W
- Area: 0.3 acres (0.12 ha)
- Built: 1893
- Architectural style: Romanesque
- Part of: Cleveland Commercial Historic District (ID16000115)
- NRHP reference No.: 84003263

Significant dates
- Added to NRHP: April 05, 1984
- Designated CP: May 5, 2007

Broad Street United Methodist Church is a historic Methodist church located at 155 Central Ave NW (263 Broad Street, NW) in Cleveland, Tennessee, United States.

The Broad Street United Methodist congregation traces its history to 1836, when Methodists met for worship in the Bradley County Courthouse in Cleveland. From 1836 until 1893, when the church's current building was completed, the congregation was based at four different sites in the city. It was known at one time as Lea Street Methodist Episcopal Church.

In 1863, during the Civil War, the church's building at the corner of Church and First Streets was taken over by the Union Army and used as a stable and granary. In 1867-1868, the congregation erected a new brick building at the present church location. In 1893, that building was demolished and the current church building was constructed on the same site. It is designed in the Romanesque Revival style, with an Akron plan sanctuary. Additions were made to the building in 1922 and 1968.

The church building was added to the National Register of Historic Places in 1984.
