= Ebenezer Cumberland Presbyterian Church =

Historic church in Tennessee, United States

- U.S. National Register of Historic Places
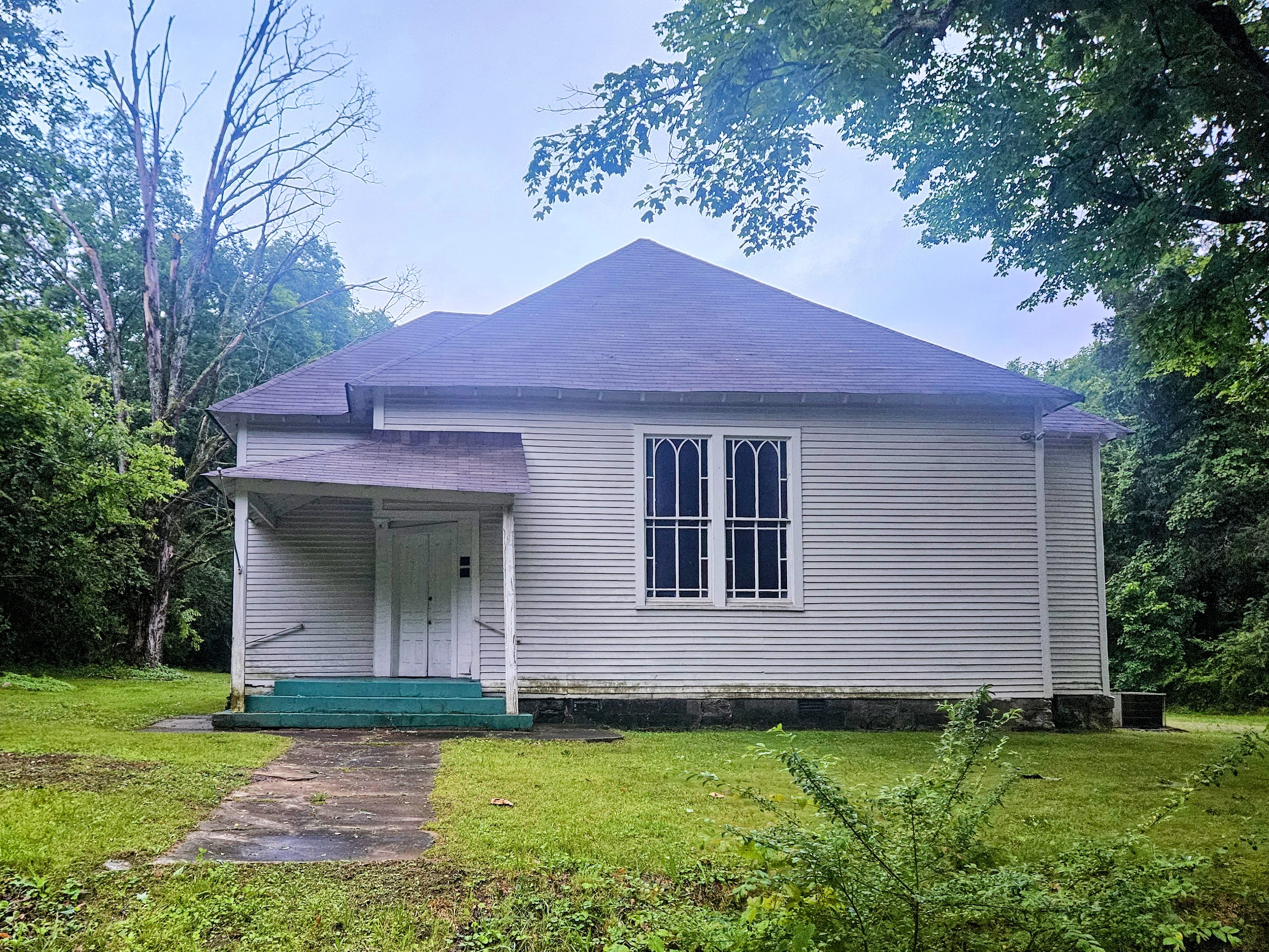
- Ebenezer Cumberland Presbyterian Church, May 25, 2025
- Location: 3040 Griffith Highway, Jasper, Tennessee
- Coordinates: 35°4′26″N 85°33′36″W
- Built: ca. 1914
- Architectural style: Vernacular
- NRHP reference No.: 100004698
- Added to NRHP: June 15, 2020

Ebenezer Cumberland Presbyterian Church is a Cumberland Presbyterian congregation in Marion County, Tennessee. The church is located at 3040 Griffith Highway, Jasper, Tennessee and was listed on the National Register of Historic Places on June 15, 2020.

== History ==
Ebenezer Church was likely the first Cumberland Presbyterian church in the Sequatchie Valley, organized ca. 1830 on land across the road from the current church building on land donated by John and Mary Oats Hoge. In both 1854 and 1909 the church was destroyed by what was most likely tornados, despite the fact that local newspaper accounts described the storms as both cyclones and hurricanes. The current church building was constructed after the 1909 storm.

== Description ==
Ebenezer Cumberland Presbyterian Church is an example of the vernacular architectural style although its windows include pointed stained glass windowpanes, which is suggestive of the Gothic Revival style. It has a pyramidal roof atop a roughly square form with a corner entry, which is atypical of most churches in Tennessee. Church members say that the pot-bellied stove and pews from the 2nd destroyed church building were saved and reused in the current building.

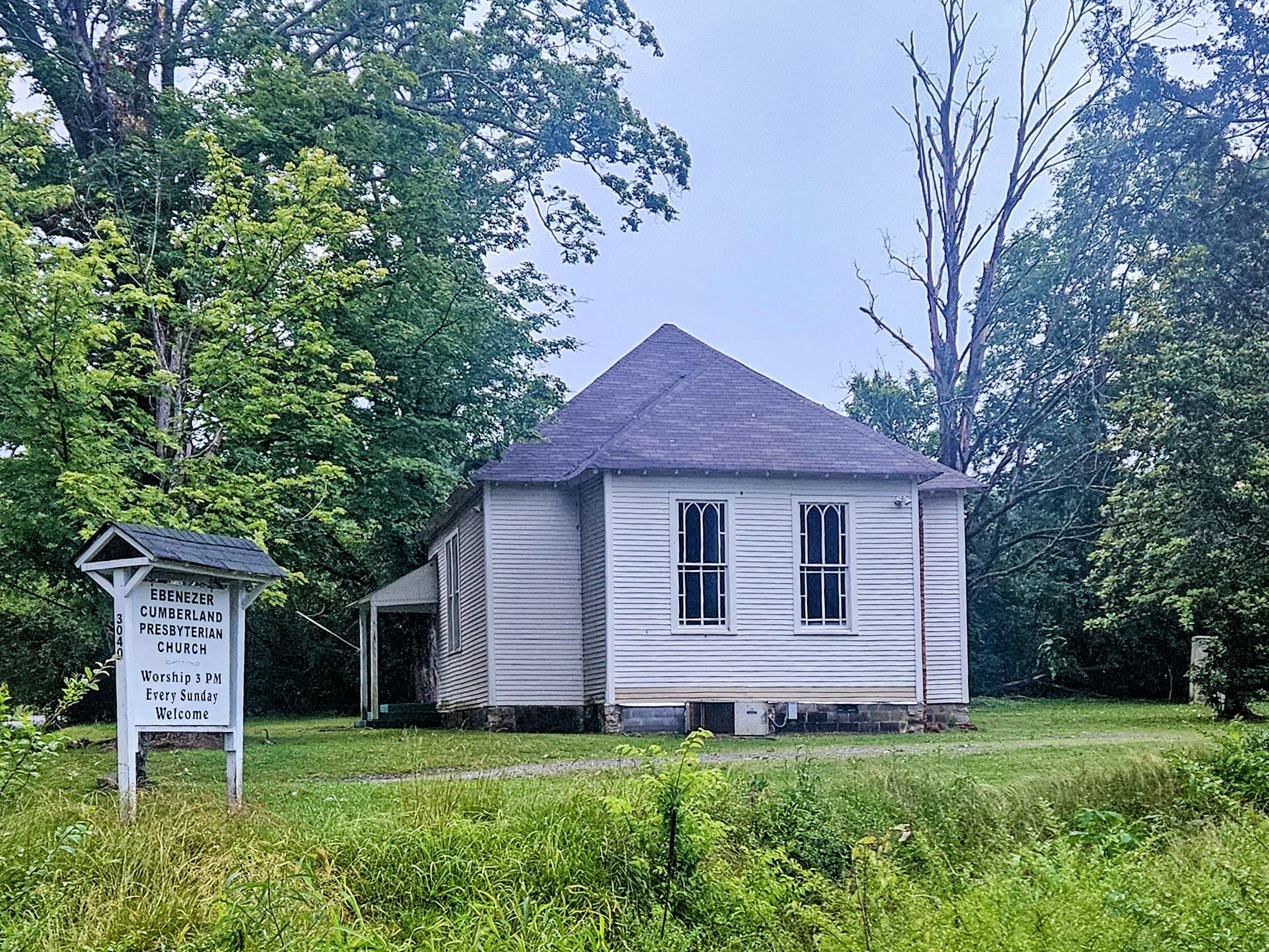
Ebenezer Cumberland Baptist Church Southwest facade and sign
