= History of women in the United States =

The history of women in the United States encompasses the lived experiences and contributions of women throughout American history.

The earliest women living in what is now the United States were Native Americans. European women arrived in the 17th century and brought with them European culture and values. During the 19th century, women were primarily restricted to domestic roles in keeping with Protestant values. The campaign for women's suffrage in the United States culminated with the adoption of the Nineteenth Amendment to the U.S. Constitution in 1920. During World War II, many women filled roles vacated by men fighting overseas. Beginning in the 1960s, the second-wave feminist movement changed cultural perceptions of women, although it was unsuccessful in passing the Equal Rights Amendment. In the 21st century, women have achieved greater representation in prominent roles in American life.

The study of women's history has been a major scholarly and popular field, with many scholarly books and articles, museum exhibits, and courses in schools and universities. The roles of women were long ignored in textbooks and popular histories. By the 1960s, women were being presented more often. An early feminist approach underscored their victimization and inferior status at the hands of men. In the 21st century, writers have emphasized the distinctive strengths displayed inside the community of women, with special concern for minorities among women.

== Colonial era ==
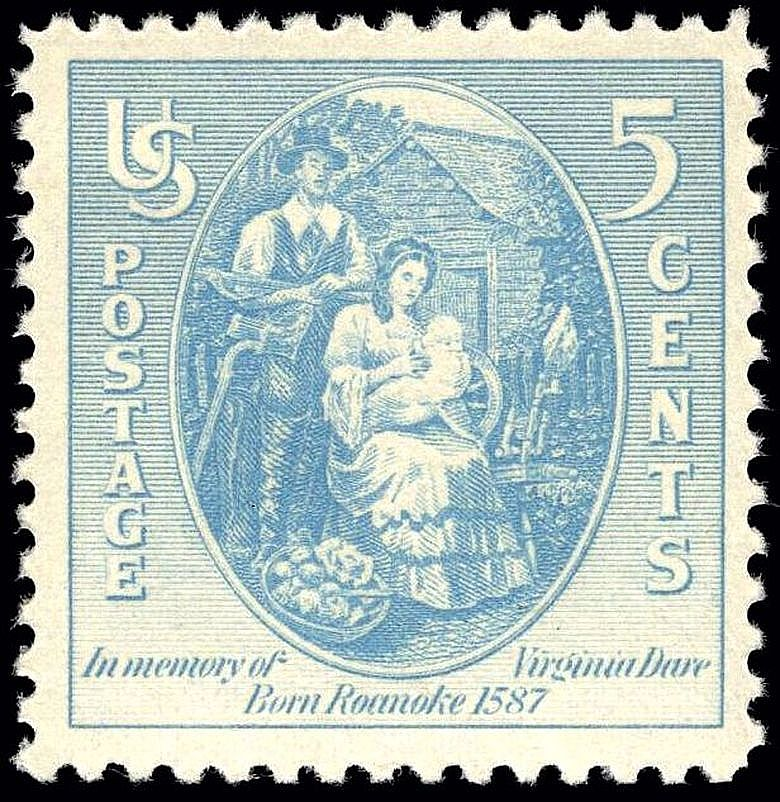
A stamp honoring Virginia Dare, who in 1587 became the first English child born in what became the United States

Native American women previous to and during the time of Colonial America were highly regarded as leaders. Many Indigenous women had decision making power and were respected in their communities. After colonization, however, one of the first forms of assimilation that the Native American community experienced was reducing the role of Indigenous women to match the patriarchal status of the English/American women.

The experiences of women during the colonial era varied from colony to colony, but there were some overall patterns. Most of the British settlers were from England and Wales, with smaller numbers from Scotland and Ireland. Groups of families settled together in New England, while families tended to settle independently in the Southern colonies. The American colonies absorbed several thousands of Dutch and Swedish settlers. After 1700, most immigrants to Colonial America arrived as indentured servants—young unmarried men and women seeking a new life in a much richer environment. After the 1660s, a steady flow of black slaves arrived, chiefly from the Caribbean. Food supplies were much more abundant than in Europe, and there was an abundance of fertile land that needed farm families. However, the disease environment was hostile in the malaria-ridden South, where a large portion of the arrivals died within five years. The American-born children were immune from the fatal forms of malaria.

Lucas Vázquez de Ayllón's unsuccessful American colony in 1526–1527 (San Miguel de Gualdape) involved about 600 colonizers, including women; only about 150 returned home alive.

The first English people to arrive in America were the members of the Roanoke Colony who came to North Carolina in July 1587, with 17 women, 91 men, and 9 boys as the founding colonists. On August 18, 1587, Virginia Dare was born in the colony; she was the first English child born in the territory of the United States. Her mother was Eleanor Dare, the daughter of John White, governor of the Roanoke colony. It is not known what happened to the members of the Roanoke colony.

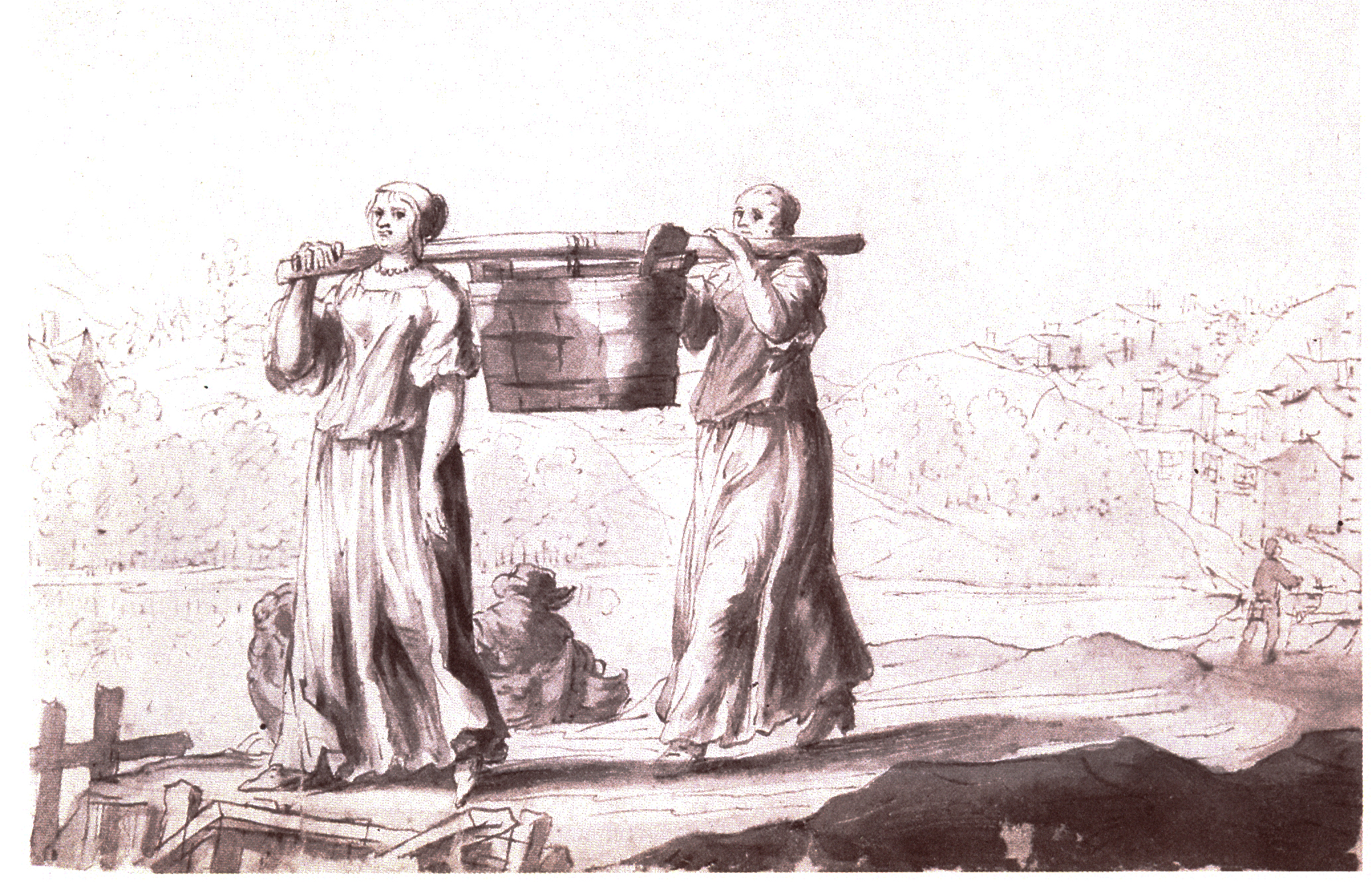
Women's work in the 17th century, carrying a communal latrine

=== Virginia ===
Jamestown, the first English settlement in America, was established in 1607 in what is now Virginia. In 1608 the first English women (two of them, Mistress Forrest and her maid Anne Burras) arrived in Jamestown. Burras became the first English woman to marry in the New World, and her daughter Virginia Laydon was the first child of English colonists to be born in Jamestown.

The first Africans since those in Lucas Vázquez de Ayllón's unsuccessful colony in 1526–1527 (San Miguel de Gualdape) were brought to Jamestown in 1619; they consisted of about twenty people, including at least one woman. They were captives originally from the Kingdom of Ndongo in modern Angola, who had been part of a larger group heading to Mexico, and were taken after an attack on their Portuguese slave ship by English privateers. Their arrival is seen as a beginning of the history of slavery in Virginia and also as a starting point for African-American history, given that they were the first such group in mainland British America.

Also in 1619, 90 young single women from England went to Jamestown to become wives of the men there, with the women being auctioned off for 150 pounds of tobacco each (to be paid to the shipping company), as that was the cost of each woman's travel to America. Such voyagers were often called "tobacco brides". There were many such voyages to America for this purpose (the 1619 voyage being the first), with the tobacco brides promised free passage and trousseaus for their trouble.

=== New England ===
In New England, the Puritan settlers from England brought their strong religious values and highly organized social structure with them. They believed a woman should dedicate herself to rearing God-fearing children to the best of her ability.

There were ethnic differences in the treatment of women. Among Puritan settlers in New England, wives almost never worked in the fields with their husbands. In German communities in Pennsylvania, however, many women worked in fields and stables. German and Dutch immigrants granted women more control over property, which was not permitted in the local English law. Unlike English colonial wives, German and Dutch wives owned their own clothes and other items and were also given the ability to write wills disposing of the property brought into the marriage. The New England regional economy grew rapidly in the 17th century, thanks to heavy immigration, high birth rates, low death rates, and an abundance of inexpensive farmland. The population grew from 3000 in 1630 to 14,000 in 1640, 33,000 in 1660, 68,000 in 1680, and 91,000 in 1700. Between 1630 and 1643, about 20,000 Puritans arrived, settling mostly near Boston; after 1643 fewer than fifty immigrants a year arrived. The average size of a completed family 1660–1700 was 7.1 children; the birth rate was 49 babies per year per 1000 people, and the death rate was about 22 deaths per year per 1000 people. About 27 percent of the population comprised men between 16 and 60 years old.

The benefits of economic growth were widely distributed, with even farm laborers better off at the end of the colonial period. The growing population led to shortages of good farm land on which young families could establish themselves; one result was to delay marriage, and another was to move to new lands further west. In the towns and cities, there was strong entrepreneurship, and a steady increase in the specialization of labor. Wages for men went up steadily before 1775; new occupations were opening for women, including weaving, teaching, and tailoring. The region bordered New France, which used Indian warriors to attack outlying villages. Women were sometimes captured. In the numerous French and Indian Wars the British government poured money in to purchase supplies, build roads and pay colonial soldiers. The coastal ports began to specialize in fishing, international trade and shipbuilding—and after 1780 in whaling. Combined with a growing urban markets for farm products, these factors allowed the economy to flourish despite the lack of technological innovation.

==== Schooling ====
Tax-supported schooling for girls began as early as 1767 in New England. It was optional and some towns proved reluctant. Northampton, Massachusetts, for example, was a late adopter because it had many rich families who dominated the political and social structures and they did not want to pay taxes to aid poor families. Northampton assessed taxes on all households, rather than only on those with children, and used the funds to support a grammar school to prepare boys for college. Not until after 1800 did Northampton educate girls with public money. In contrast, the town of Sutton, Massachusetts, was diverse in terms of social leadership and religion at an early point in its history. Sutton paid for its schools by means of taxes on households with children only, thereby creating an active constituency in favor of universal education for both boys and girls.

Historians point out that reading and writing were different skills in the colonial era. School taught both, but in places without schools reading was mainly taught to boys and also a few privileged girls. Men handled worldly affairs and needed to read and write. Girls only needed to read (especially religious materials). This educational disparity between reading and writing explains why the colonial women often could read, but could not write so they used an "X" to sign their names.

=== Hispanic New Mexico and California ===
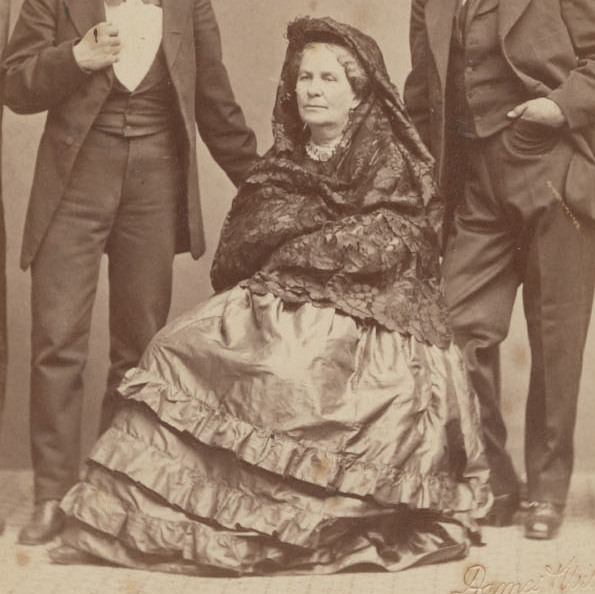
Angustias de la Guerra played a crucial role in defending women's property rights during the drafting of the 1849 Constitution of California after it became part of the United States.

Hispanic women played a central role in traditional family life in the Spanish colonies of New Mexico; their descendants comprise a large element in parts of northern New Mexico and southern Colorado. Gutierrez finds a high level of illegitimacy, especially among the Indians who were used as slaves. He finds, "Aristocrats maintained mistresses and/or sexually exploited to their slaves but rarely admitted to fathering illegitimate children."

=== Colonial personalities and activities ===
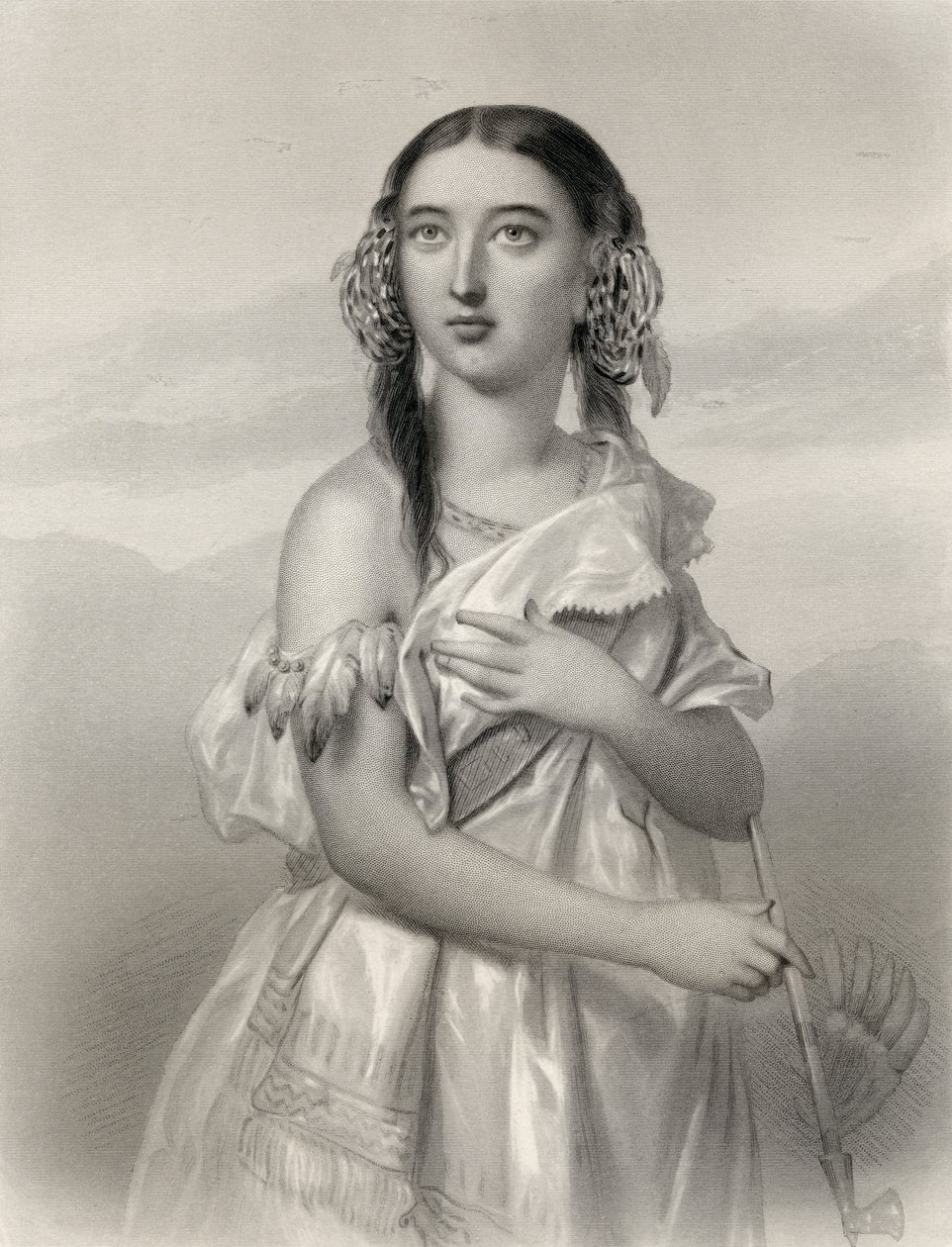
Pocahontas (1596–1617) of Virginia

==== Pocahontas ====
The American Indian woman has been seen as a symbolic paradox. Depending on the perspective, she has been viewed as either the "civilized princess" or the "destructive squaw". A highly favorable image has surrounded Pocahontas, the daughter of the Native American chief Powhatan in Virginia. John Smith himself said she saved him from being clubbed to death by her father in 1607, though there is some doubt as to whether this is what really happened. She was taken hostage by the colonists in 1612, when she was seventeen. She converted to Christianity and married planter John Rolfe in 1614. It was the first recorded interracial marriage in American history. This marriage brought a peace between the colonists and the Indians. She and Rolfe sailed to England in 1616, where she was presented at the court of King James I; she died soon after. Townsend argues that Pocahontas was not a powerful princess, but just one of many of the chief's daughters. She was assertive, youthful, and athletic; she returns Rolfe's love while also observing the Algonquin practice of constructing alliances through marriage, and she accepts Christianity as complementing her Algonquin religious worldview. Many leading families in Virginia to this day proudly claim her as an ancestor. Pocahontas quickly became part of early American folklore, reflecting myth, culture, romanticism, colonialism, and historical events as well as narratives of intermarriage, heroic women, and gender and sexuality as metaphors for national, religious, and racial differences.

==== Eliza Pinckney ====
Eliza Pinckney (née Elizabeth Lucas; December 28, 1722 – May 27, 1793) transformed agriculture in colonial South Carolina, where she developed indigo as one of its most important cash crops. Its cultivation and processing as dye produced one-third the total value of the colony's exports before the Revolutionary War. The manager of three plantations, Eliza Pinckney had a major influence on the colonial economy.

==== Cecily Jordan Farrar ====
Cecily Jordan Farrar was an early woman settler of colonial Jamestown. She came to the colony as a child aboard the Swan in 1610. Arriving in the middle of the first Anglo-Powhatan war, she established herself as one of the few female ancient planters. She married Samuel Jordan sometime before 1620. After Samuel's death in 1623, Cecily established herself as one of the heads of household at Jordan's Journey. In the same year, Cecily became the defendant in the first breach of promise lawsuit in English North America when she chose the marriage proposal of William Farrar over that of Grivell Pooley (see Cecily Jordan v. Greville Pooley dispute).

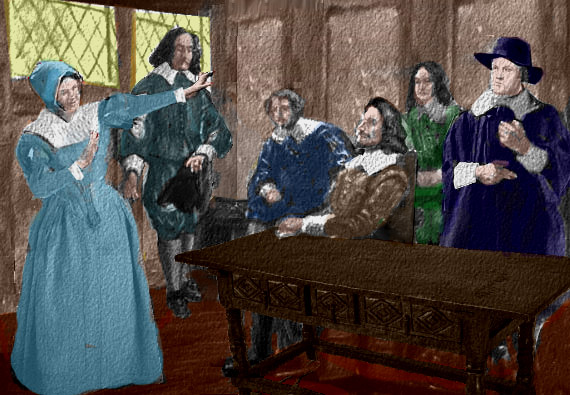
Dramatization of Cecily Jordan rejecting Greville Pooley's claims

==== Mayflower women ====
On November 21, 1620, the Mayflower arrived in what is today Provincetown, Massachusetts, bringing the Puritan pilgrims. There were 102 people aboard – 18 married women traveling with their husbands, seven unmarried women traveling with their parents, three young unmarried women, one girl, and 73 men. Three fourths of the women died in the first few months; while the men were building housing and drinking fresh water the women were confined to the damp and crowded quarters of the ship. By the time of the first Thanksgiving in autumn 1621, there were only four women from the Mayflower left alive.

==== Anne Hutchinson ====
In the 1630s, Anne Hutchinson (1591–1643) began to hold religious meetings in her home, which attracted the attendance not only of women but of prominent men, including affluent young civil officials. Hutchinson's charisma indeed was so great that it became a threat to the ability of the clergy to govern; this was especially clear when some of her male supporters refused to join the militia in pursuit of Pequot natives. The authorities, led by Reverend John Winthrop (who was also the colony's governor), first attacked her indirectly by banishing her brother-in-law, a minister who shared her views. Hutchinson herself was summoned to trial late in 1637 and also banished, but allowed to remain under house arrest until the end of winter. In March 1638, she was again brought before the court and formally excommunicated; she and her children soon joined her husband, who had prepared a home for them in the new colony of Rhode Island, which had been founded less than two years earlier by other dissidents exiled from Massachusetts. At nearly 47, In 1660, Mary Dyer, a Quaker who had been among Hutchinson's followers, was hanged in Massachusetts for repeatedly returning to Massachusetts and proselytizing for Quakerism.

==== Enslaved women ====
In 1655, Elizabeth Key Grinstead, who was enslaved in Virginia, won her freedom in a lawsuit based on her father's status as a free Englishman (her mother was a slave and her father was her mother's owner), helped by the fact that her father had baptized her as Christian in the Church of England. However, in 1662 the Virginia House of Burgesses passed a law stating that any child born in the colony would follow the status of its mother, slave or free. This was an overturn of a longheld principle of English Common Law, whereby a child's status followed that of the father; it enabled white men who raped enslaved women to hide the mixed-race children born as a result and removed their responsibility to acknowledge, support, or emancipate those children. When Europeans began to arrive in the New World, many indigenous people converted. As a result, religion was less useful as a way to differentiate and skin color became more important. Many elite men had children with enslaved people. Pregnancy out of wedlock was encouraged among nonwhite women as the children would become workers/enslaved. The number of births out of wedlock in Latin America was much higher than in Europe. On the other hand, unmarried white women who had mixed-race children were treated worse than those who had white children. Despite the expectation of men to father mixed-raced children with nonwhite women, rape of a woman by a black man could lead to castration and European women who married indigenous men lost their "European" status. As more white women moved to the new colonies, interracial sex became less common since Europeans became concerned with "racial survival".

==== Witches ====
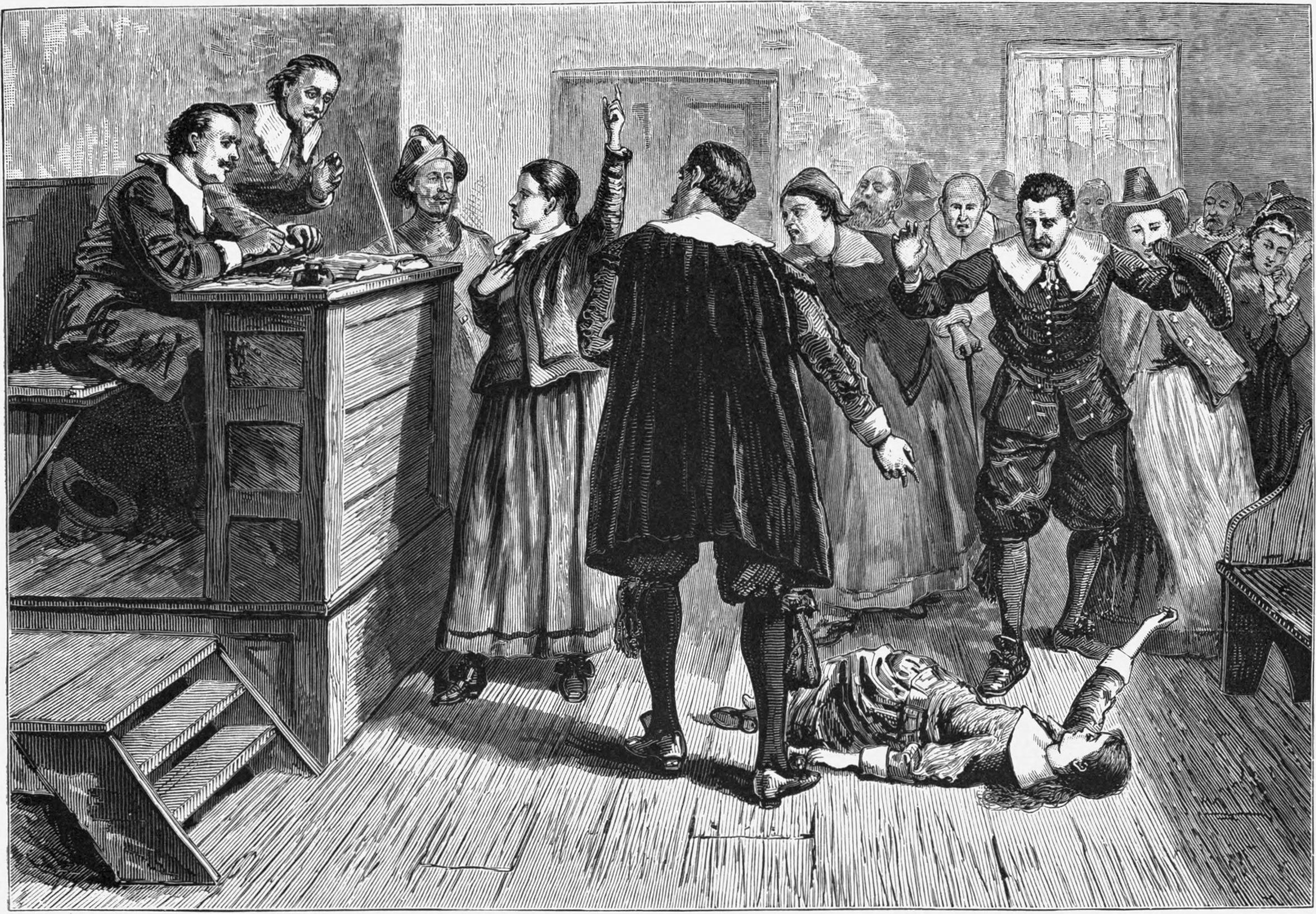
Witchcraft trial at Salem Village (1876 illustration).

In the small Puritan community of Salem Village, Massachusetts, the Salem witch trials began in 1692. They began when a group of girls gathered in the evenings in the home of Reverend Parris to listen to stories told by one of his slaves, Tituba. They played fortune-telling games, which were strictly forbidden by the Puritans. The girls began acting strangely, leading the Puritan community to suspect that the girls were victims of witchcraft. The girls named three townswomen as witches – Tituba, Sarah Good, and Sarah Osbourne; Tituba confessed to having seen the devil and also stated that there was a coven of witches in the Salem Village area. The other two women insisted they were innocent, but had a formal legal trial where they were found guilty of practicing witchcraft.

The affected girls accused other townspeople of torturing them with witchcraft, and some on trial also named others as witches. By the end of the trials in 1693, 24 people had died, some in jail but 19 by hanging, and one by being pressed to death. Some of the accused confessed to being witches, but none of those were hanged, only those who maintained their innocence; those who were hanged include 13 women and 6 men.

Salem was the beginning, but it was quickly followed by witchcraft scares in 24 other Puritan communities, with 120 more accused witches. Outside Salem, the episodes were short and not dramatic, and usually involved only one or two people. Most were older women, often widowed or single, with a history of bickering and disputes with neighbors. In October 1692, the governor of Massachusetts halted court proceedings, restricted new arrests, and then dissolved the Court of Oyer and Terminer, thereby ending the witch hunts.

==== Housewives ====
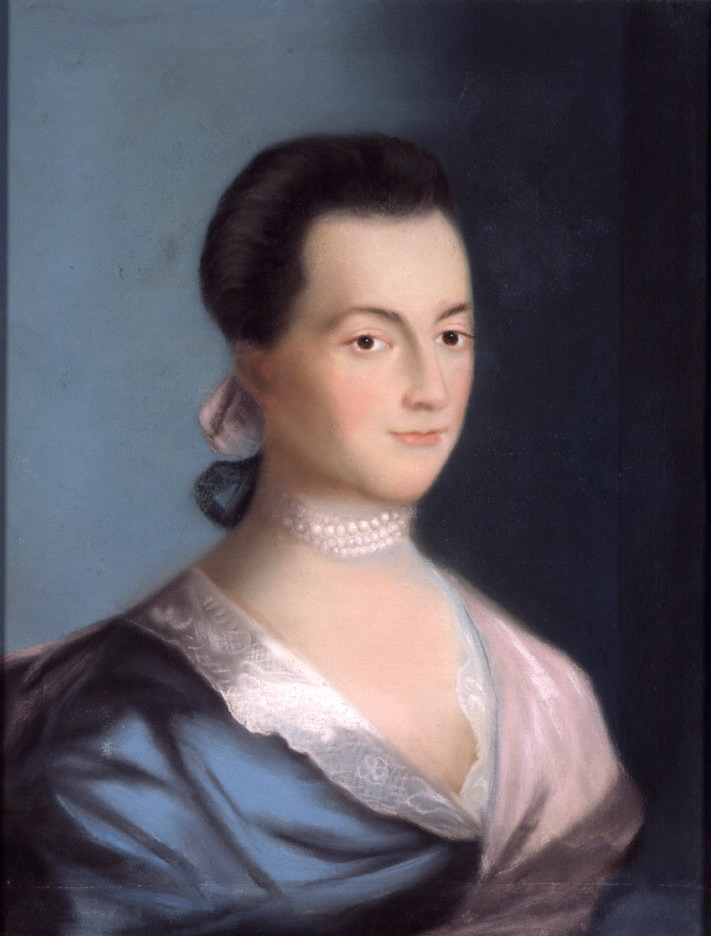
Abigail Adams, wife of President John Adams

"Housewife" (called a "Goodwife" in New England) refers to the married women's economic and cultural roles. Under legal rules of "coverture," a wife had no separate legal identity; everything she did was under her authority of her husband. He controlled all the money, including any dowry or inheritance she might have brought to the marriage. She had certain legal rights to a share of the family property when the husband died. She was in charge of feeding, cleaning and medical care for everyone in the household, as well as supervising the servants. The housewife's domain, depending upon wealth, would also include "cellars, pantries, brew houses, milk houses, wash houses and butteries". She was responsible for home manufacturing of clothing, candles, and foodstuffs. At harvest time she helped the menfolk gather the crops. She typically kept a vegetable garden, and cared for the poultry and milked the cows. The husband handled the other livestock and the dogs. Mothers were responsible for the spiritual and civic well being of her children. Good housewives raised good children who would become upstanding citizens in the community. Legal statutes and societal norms allowed for husbands to exert physical power over their wives, which could result in violence. A few housewives were able to file for divorces.

==== Writers ====
In 1650, Anne Dudley Bradstreet became America's first published poet, with the publication of her book of poetry entitled The Tenth Muse Lately Sprung up in America. It was also published in London that same year, making Bradstreet the first female poet ever published in both England and the New World. Bradstreet linked sexual and cultural reproduction and posited the nuclear family as the place where individual and community identities are formed; she located education within a familial rather than an institutional setting. The earliest known work of literature by an African American and by a slave, Lucy Terry's poem "Bars Fight," was composed in 1746 and was first published in 1855 in Josiah Holland's "History of Western Massachusetts The poem describes a violent incident that occurred between settlers and Native Americans in Deerfield, Massachusetts in 1746. Former slave Phillis Wheatley became a literary sensation in 1770 after she wrote a poem on the death of the evangelical preacher George Whitefield. In 1773, 39 of Phillis Wheatley's poems were published in London as a book entitled Poems on Various Subjects, Religious and Moral. This was the first published book by an African American.

==== One voter ====
In 1756, Lydia Chapin Taft of Uxbridge, Massachusetts became the only colonial woman known to vote, casting a vote in the local town hall meeting in place of her deceased husband. From 1775 until 1807, the state constitution in New Jersey permitted all persons worth fifty pounds who resided in the state for one year to vote; free black people and single women therefore had the vote until 1807, but not married women, as their property ownership was invariably limited.

==== Great Awakening ====
In the 1740s evangelists ignited a religious revival—called the First Great Awakening—which energized Protestants up and down the 13 colonies. It was characterized by ecstatic emotionalism and egalitarianism, which split several denominations into old and new factions. They expanded their membership among the white farmers; women were especially active in the Methodist and Baptist churches that were springing up everywhere. Although the women were rarely allowed to preach, they had a voice and a vote in church affairs, and were especially interested in close monitoring of the moral behavior of church members. The Awakening led many women to be introspective; some kept diaries or wrote memoirs. The autobiography of Hannah Heaton (1721–94), a farm wife of North Haven, Connecticut, tells of her experiences in the Great Awakening, her encounters with Satan, her intellectual and spiritual development, and life on the farm.

The evangelicals worked hard to convert the slaves to Christianity and were especially successful among black women, who played the role of religious specialists in Africa and again in America. Slave women exercised wide-ranging spiritual leadership among Africans in America in healing and medicine, church discipline, and revivalistic enthusiasm.

=== American Revolution ===
==== The coming of the Revolution ====
Using the colonies of Virginia and Maryland as a case study, Mellen argues that women in the mid-18th century had a significant role in the world of print and the public sphere. The voice of women was spread through books, newspapers, and popular almanacs. Some women writers sought equal treatment under the law and became involved in public debates even before the Stamp Act controversy of 1765.

A powerful coercive tool the Americans used to protest British policies after 1765 was the boycott of imported British consumer goods. Women played an active role in encouraging patriotic boycotts and monitoring compliance. They refused to purchase imports, while emphasizing the virtues of avoiding luxury by using homespun clothing and other locally made products.

==== The impact of the Revolution ====
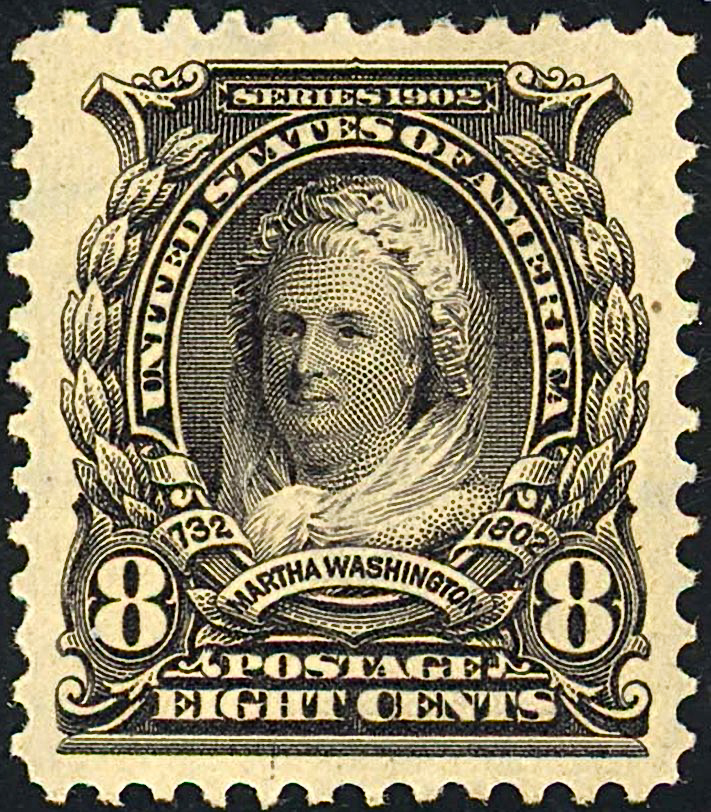
The first Martha Washington postage stamp, issue of 1902.

The Revolution had a deep effect on the philosophical underpinnings of American society. One aspect that was drastically changed by the democratic ideals of the Revolution was the roles of women.

The idea of republican motherhood was born in this period and reflects the importance of Republicanism as the dominant American ideology. Republicanism assumed that a successful republic rested upon the virtue of its citizens. Thus, women had the essential role of instilling their children with values conducive to a healthy republic. During this period, the wife's relationship with her husband also became more liberal, as love and affection instead of obedience and subservience began to characterize the ideal marital relationship. In addition, many women contributed to the war effort through fundraising and running family businesses in the absence of husbands.

Whatever gains they had made, however, women still found themselves subordinated, legally and socially, to their husbands, disenfranchised and with only the role of mother open to them. Deborah Sampson was the only woman historians know of who fought disguised as a man in the Revolutionary War. In 1782, she disguised herself as a man and joined the 4th Massachusetts Regiment. When her gender was finally discovered she was given an honorable discharge. Many women were attached to the Army to help their husbands, and to handle cooking and cleaning. In 1776, Margaret Corbin fired her husband's cannon after he was killed; she was herself severely wounded in the battle. She received a pension from Congress in recognition of her service, making her the first American woman ever to receive a government pension. At the battle of Monmouth in 1778, Mary Ludwig Hays McCauley fired her husband's cannon after he was wounded in battle. Her story morphed into the "Molly Pitcher" legend.

In March 1776, Abigail Adams wrote to her husband John Adams, a leader in the Continental Congress, recommending "In the new code of laws which I suppose it will be necessary for you to make, I desire you would remember the ladies and be more generous and favorable to them than your ancestors. Do not put such unlimited power into the hands of the husbands." Her husband wrote back, "As to your extraordinary code of laws, I cannot but laugh...Depend upon it, we know better than to repeal our masculine systems."

Zagarri argues the Revolution created an ongoing debate on the rights of woman and created an environment favorable to women's participation in politics. She asserts that for a brief decade, a "comprehensive transformation in women's rights, roles, and responsibilities seemed not only possible but perhaps inevitable." women took a small but visible role in the public sphere after 1783. First Lady Martha Washington sponsored social events in the national capital. The socializing became known as "the Republican Court" and provided elite women with an opportunity to play backstage political role. This reached a climax in the Petticoat affair of 1830, in which the wives of President Andrew Jackson's cabinet members humiliated the wife of the Secretary of War, leading to a political crisis for the president.

However the opening of possibilities also engendered a backlash that actually set back the cause of women's rights and led to a greater rigidity that marginalized women from political life.

==== Quakers ====
Quakers were strong in Pennsylvania and New Jersey, and had developed equalitarian views of the role of women. They believed that all human beings, regardless of sex, had the same Inner light. Quakers were represented among the Founding Fathers by John Dickinson and Thomas Mifflin, although Mifflin was expelled by the Society of Friends because of his leadership role in the Continental Army.

== 1800–1900 ==
=== Sacagawea ===
The best known Indian woman after Pocahontas was Sacagawea (1788–1812), who accompanied the Lewis and Clark Expedition (1804–1806) overland expedition to the Pacific coast and back. The two captains hired her husband, a fur trapper, as an interpreter, with the understanding that she would come along to interpret the Shoshone language, which she did. Sacagawea was only about 16 and delivered a son on the trip. Her role has been greatly exaggerated, in large part because writers wanted to use her as an Indian endorsement of Manifest Destiny.

=== Midwestern pioneers ===
Clear-cut gender norms prevailed among the farm families who settled in the Midwestern region between 1800 and 1840. Men were the breadwinners who considered the profitability of farming in a particular location – or "market-minded agrarianism" – and worked hard to provide for their families. They had an almost exclusive voice regarding public matters, such as voting and handling the money. During the migration westward, women's diaries show little interest in and financial problems, but great concern with the threat of separation from family and friends. Furthermore, women experienced a physical toll because they were expected to have babies, supervise the domestic chores, care for the sick, and take control of the garden crops and poultry. Outside the German American community, women rarely did fieldwork on the farm. The women set up neighborhood social organizations, often revolving around church membership, or quilting parties. They exchanged information and tips on child-rearing, and helped each other in childbirth.

=== Reform movements ===
Many women in the 19th century were involved in reform movements, particularly abolitionism.

In 1831, Maria W. Stewart (who was African-American) began to write essays and make speeches against slavery, promoting educational and economic self-sufficiency for African Americans. The first woman of any color to speak on political issues in public, Stewart gave her last public speech in 1833 before retiring from public speaking to work in women's organizations.

Although her career was short, it set the stage for the African-American women speakers who followed; Frances Ellen Watkins Harper, Sojourner Truth, and Harriet Tubman, among others. Since more direct participation in the public arena was fraught with difficulties and danger, many women assisted the movement by boycotting slave-produced goods and organizing fairs and food sales to raise money for the cause.

To take one example of the danger, Pennsylvania Hall was the site in 1838 of the Anti-Slavery Convention of American Women, and as 3,000 white and black women gathered to hear prominent abolitionists such as Maria Weston Chapman, the speakers' voices were drowned out by the mob which had gathered outside. When the women emerged, arms linked in solidarity, they were stoned and insulted. The mob returned the following day and burned the hall, which had been inaugurated only three days earlier, to the ground.

Furthermore, the Grimké sisters from South Carolina (Angelina and Sarah Grimké), received much abuse and ridicule for their abolitionist activity, which consisted of traveling throughout the North, lecturing about their first-hand experiences with slavery on their family plantation.

Even so, many women's anti-slavery societies were active before the Civil War, the first one having been created in 1832 by free black women from Salem, Massachusetts Fiery abolitionist Abby Kelley Foster was an ultra-abolitionist, who also led Lucy Stone, and Susan B. Anthony into the anti-slavery movement.

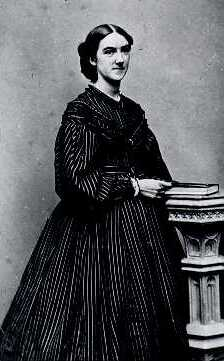
Miss Ellen Henrietta Swallow, photograph ca. 1864.

=== Education ===
In 1821, Emma Willard founded the Troy Female Seminary in Troy, New York, which was the first American educational institution to offer young women a pre-college education equal to that given to young men. Students at this private secondary school for girls were taught academic subjects that usually were reserved for males. Subjects included algebra, anatomy, natural philosophy and geography.

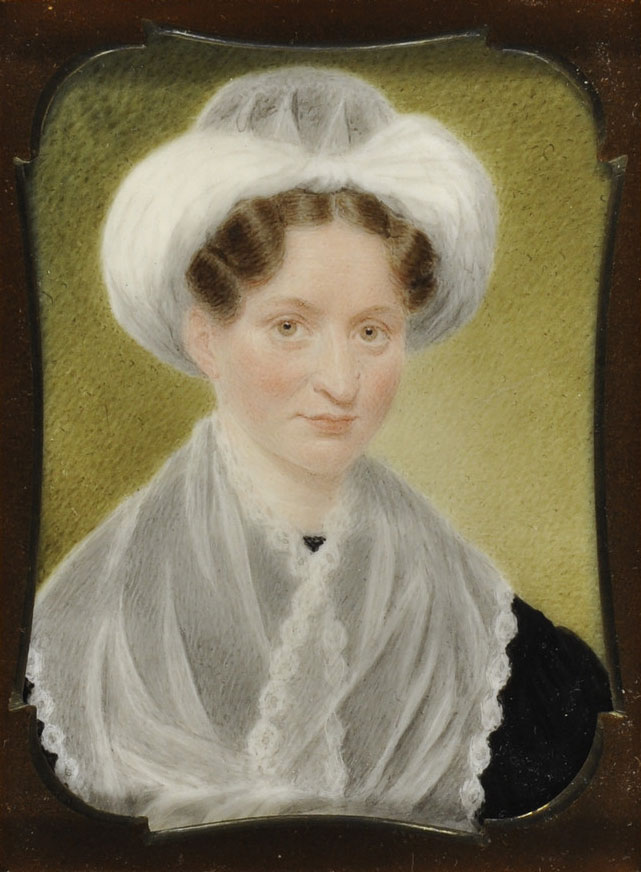
Mary Lyon (1797–1849) founded the first woman's college, Mount Holyoke College in western Massachusetts in 1837

Mary Lyon (1797–1849) founded Mount Holyoke Female Seminary in 1837. It was the first college opened for women and is now Mount Holyoke College, one of the Seven Sisters. Lyon was a deeply religious Congregationalist who, although not a minister, preached revivals at her school. She greatly admired colonial theologian Jonathan Edwards for his theology and his ideals of self-restraint, self-denial, and disinterested benevolence. Georgia Female College, now Wesleyan College opened in 1839 as the first Southern college for women.

Oberlin College opened in 1833 as Oberlin Collegiate Institute, in the heavily Yankee northeastern corner of Ohio. In 1837, it became the first coeducational college by admitting four women. Soon women were fully integrated into the college, and comprised from a third to a half of the student body. The religious founders, especially evangelical theologian Charles Grandison Finney, saw women as inherently morally superior to men. Indeed, many alumnae, inspired by this sense of superiority and their personal duty to fulfill God's mission engaged in missionary work. Historians have typically presented coeducation at Oberlin as an enlightened societal development presaging the future evolution of the ideal of equality for women in higher education

The enrollment of women in higher education grew steadily after the Civil War. In 1870, 8,300 women comprised 21% of all college students. In 1930, 480,000 women comprised 44% of the student body.

College women enrollment	Women's colleges	Coed-colleges	% of all students
1870	6,500	2,600	21%
1890	16,800	39,500	36%
1910	34,100	106,500	40%
1930	82,100	398,700	44%

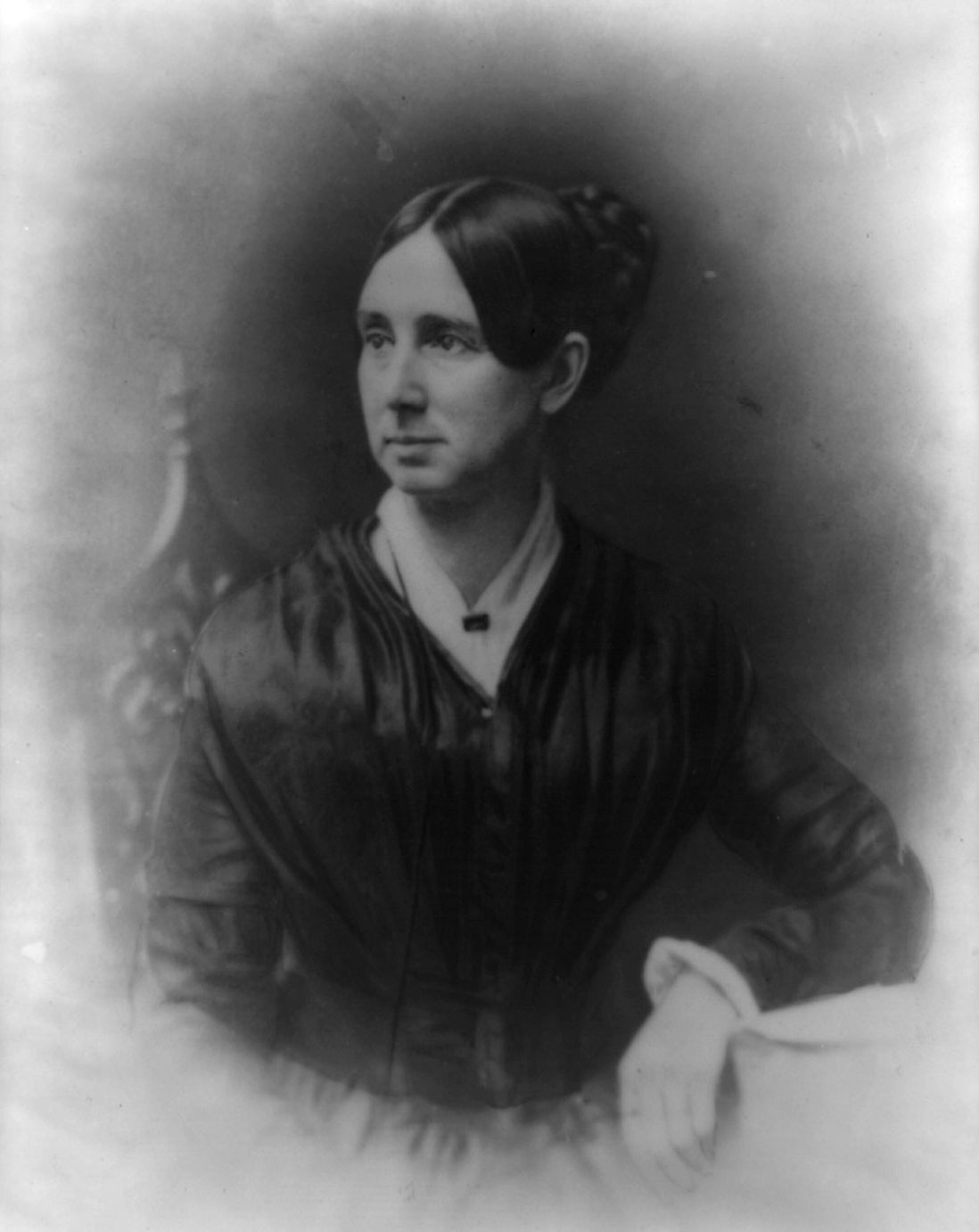
Dorothea Dix

=== Asylums and health ===
Women were heavily involved with the rights of people confined in institutions. Dorothea Dix (1802–1887) was especially well known. She investigated the conditions of many jails, mental hospitals, and almshouses, and presented her findings to state legislatures, leading to reforms and the building of 30 new asylums. In the Civil War she became the Union's Superintendent of Female Nurses. Many women worked at prison reform, and health reform.

=== Feminism ===
Judith Sargent Murray published the early and influential essay On the Equality of the Sexes in 1790, blaming poor standards in female education as the root of women's problems. However, scandals surrounding the personal lives of English contemporaries Catharine Macaulay and Mary Wollstonecraft pushed feminist authorship into private correspondence from the 1790s through the early decades of the nineteenth century. Feminist essays from John Neal, particularly those in Blackwood's Magazine and The Yankee in the 1820s, filled an intellectual gap between Murray and the leaders of the 1848 Seneca Falls Convention, which is generally considered the beginning of the first wave of feminism. As a male writer insulated from many common forms of attack against female feminist thinkers, Neal's advocacy was crucial to bringing feminism back into the American mainstream.

The 1848 Convention was inspired by the fact that in 1840, when Elizabeth Cady Stanton met Lucretia Mott at the World Anti-Slavery Convention in London, the conference refused to seat Mott and other women delegates from America because of their gender. Stanton, the young bride of an antislavery agent, and Mott, a Quaker preacher and veteran of reform, talked then of calling a convention to address the condition of women.

An estimated three hundred women and men attended the Convention, including notables Lucretia Mott and Frederick Douglass. At the conclusion, 68 women and 32 men signed the "Declaration of Sentiments and Resolutions", which was written by Elizabeth Cady Stanton and the M'Clintock family.

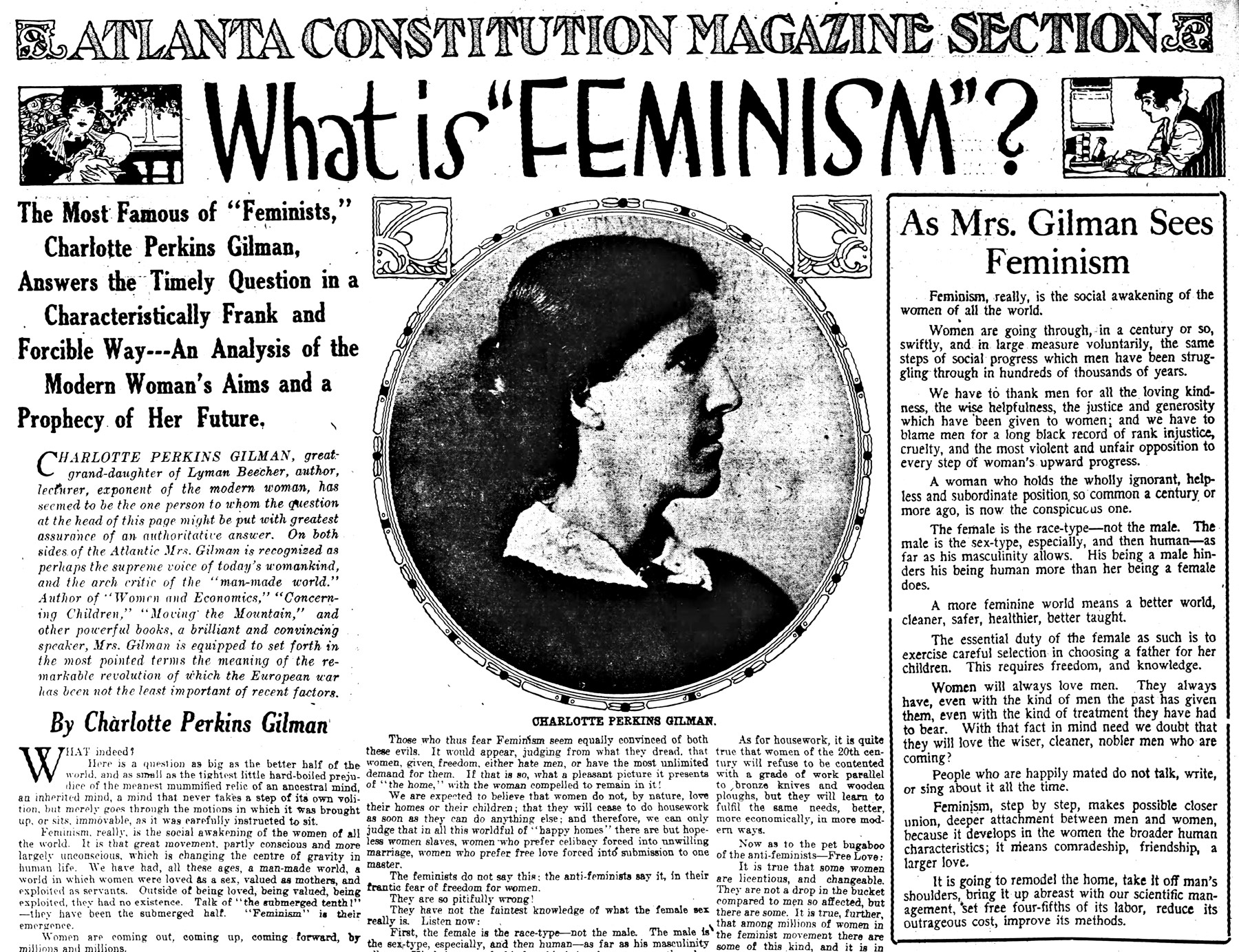
Charlotte Perkins Gilman (pictured) wrote these articles about feminism for the Atlanta Constitution, published on December 10, 1916.

The style and format of the "Declaration of Sentiments and Resolutions" was that of the "Declaration of Independence;" for example the "Declaration of Sentiments and Resolutions" stated, "We hold these truths to be self evident, that all men and women are created equal and endowed by their creator with certain inalienable rights." The Declaration further stated, "The history of mankind is a history of repeated injuries and usurpations on the part of man towards woman."

The declaration went on to specify female grievances in regard to the laws denying married women ownership of wages, money, and property (all of which they were required to turn over to their husbands; laws requiring this, in effect throughout America, were called coverture laws), women's lack of access to education and professional careers, and the lowly status accorded women in most churches. Furthermore, the Declaration declared that women should have the right to vote. 2 weeks later, some of the participants in the Seneca Falls Convention organized the Rochester Women's Rights Convention in Rochester, New York. This convention elected Abigail Bush as its president, making it the first public meeting composed of both men and women in the U.S. to choose a woman as its presiding officer. It was followed by other state and local conventions in Ohio, Pennsylvania, and New York. The first National Woman's Rights Convention was held in Worcester, Massachusetts in 1850. Women's rights conventions were held regularly from 1850 until the start of the Civil War.

=== Medicine ===
In 1849, Elizabeth Blackwell (1821–1910), graduated from Geneva Medical College in New York at the head of her class and thus became the first female doctor in America. In 1857, she and her sister Emily, and their colleague Marie Elisabeth Zakrzewska (1829–1902), founded the New York Infirmary for Indigent Women and Children, the first American hospital run by women and the first dedicated to serving women and children.

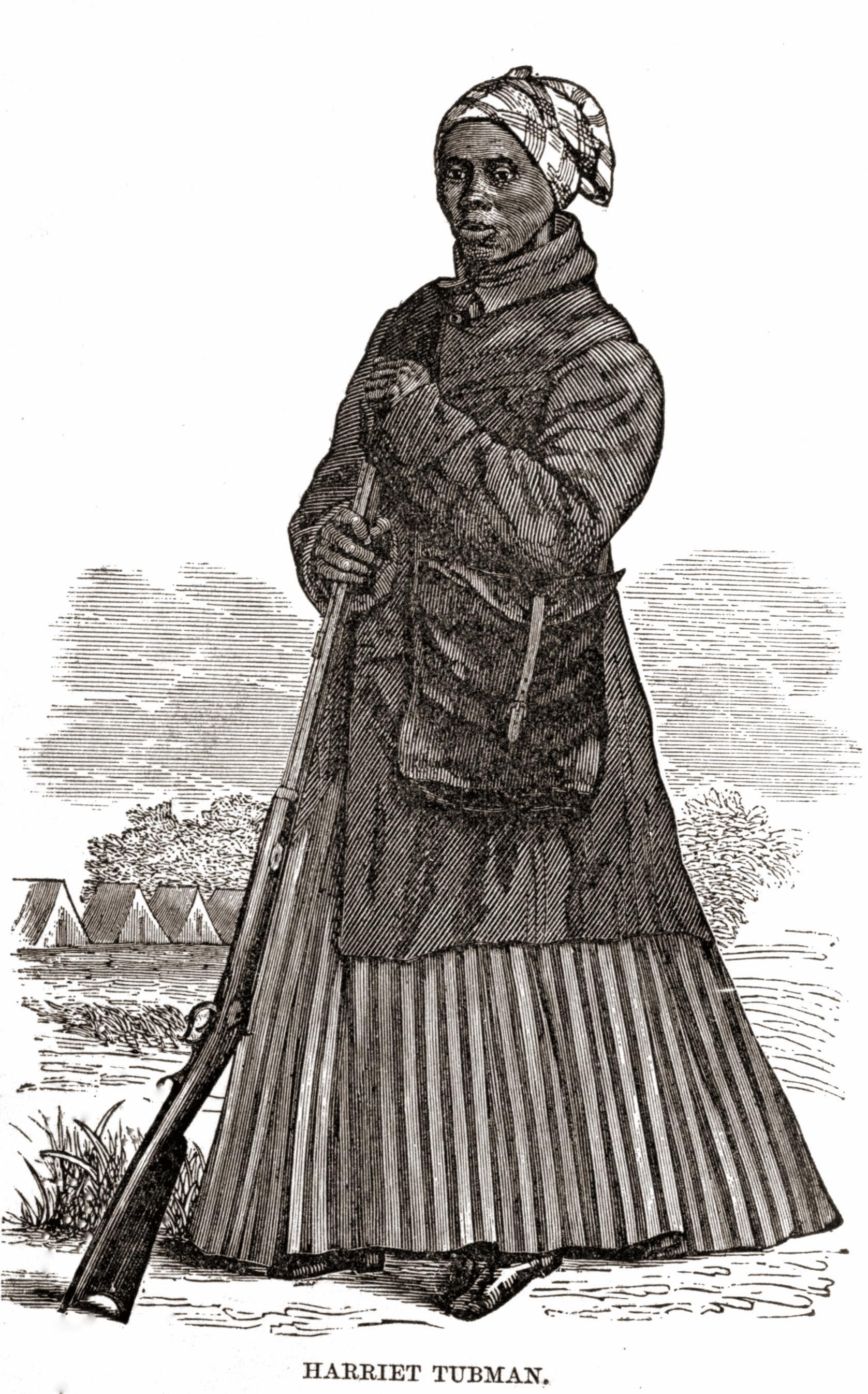
Harriet Tubman.

=== Industry ===
The rapid growth of textile manufacturing in New England 1815–1860 caused a shortage of workers. Recruiters were hired by mill agents to enlist young women. Between 1830 and 1850, thousands of unmarried farm women moved from rural areas, where there was no paid employment, to the nearby mill villages. Farmers' daughters worked to aid their families financially, save for marriage, and widen their horizons. As the textile industry grew, immigration also grew. By the 1850s the mill owners replaced all the Yankee girls with immigrants, especially Irish and French Canadians.

=== Abolitionists ===
Women continued to be active in reform movements in the second half of the 19th century. In 1851, former slave Sojourner Truth gave a famous speech, called "Ain't I a Woman?", at the Women's Rights Convention in Akron, Ohio. In this speech she condemned the attitude that women were too weak to have equal rights with men, noting the hardships she herself had endured as a slave. In 1852, Harriet Beecher Stowe wrote the abolitionist book Uncle Tom's Cabin. Begun as a serial for the Washington anti-slavery weekly, the National Era, the book focused public interest on the issue of slavery, and was deeply controversial for its strong anti-slavery stance at the time it was written. In writing the book, Stowe drew on her personal experience: she was familiar with slavery, the antislavery movement, and the Underground Railroad because Kentucky, across the Ohio River from Cincinnati, Ohio, where Stowe had lived, was a slave state. Uncle Tom's Cabin was a best-seller, selling 10,000 copies in the United States in its first week; 300,000 in the first year; and in Great Britain, 1.5 million copies in one year. Following publication of the book, Harriet Beecher Stowe became a celebrity, speaking against slavery both in America and Europe. She wrote A Key to Uncle Tom's Cabin in 1853, extensively documenting the realities on which the book was based, to refute critics who tried to argue that it was inauthentic; and published a second anti-slavery novel, Dred, in 1856. Later, when she visited President Abraham Lincoln, the family's oral tradition states that he greeted her as "the little lady who made this big war." Campaigners for other social changes, such as Caroline Norton who campaigned for women's rights, respected and drew upon Stowe's work.

In the years before the Civil War, Harriet Tubman, a runaway slave herself, freed more than 70 slaves over the course of 13 secret rescue missions to the South. In June 1863, Harriet Tubman became the first woman to plan and execute an armed expedition in United States history. Acting as an advisory to Colonel James Montgomery and his 300 soldiers, Tubman led them in a raid in South Carolina from Port Royal to the interior, some twenty-five miles up the Combahee River, where they freed approximately 800 slaves.

=== Civil War ===
==== Civil War North ====
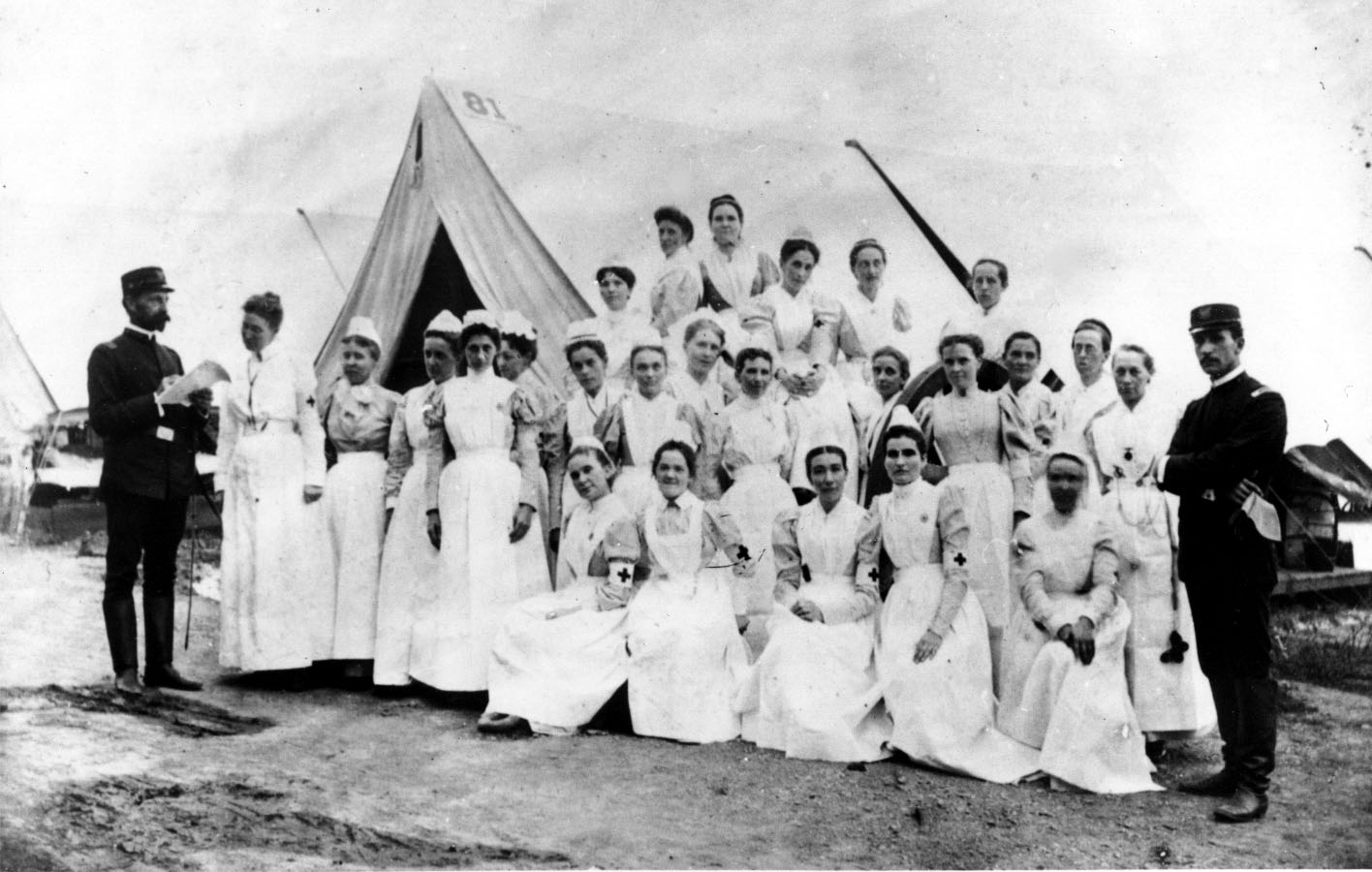
Nurses during the American Civil War

During the American Civil War (1861–1865) Dorothea Dix served as the Union's Superintendent of Female Nurses throughout the war, and was in charge of all female nurses working in army hospitals, which was over 3,000 nurses. Women provided casualty care and nursing to Union and Confederate troops at field hospitals and on the Union Hospital Ship Red Rover. Dr. Mary Edwards Walker served as assistant surgeon with General Burnside's Union forces in 1862 and with an Ohio regiment in East Tennessee the following year. Imprisoned in Richmond as a spy, she was eventually released and returned to serve as a hospital surgeon at a women's prisoner-of-war hospital in Louisville, Kentucky. After the war, President Andrew Johnson awarded her the Medal of Honor, making her the only woman ever to receive the United States' highest military honor. The number of female soldiers who served in disguise was perhaps 400 to 750.

==== Confederacy ====
At the start southern women gave zealous support for their menfolk going off to war. They saw the men as protectors and invested heavily in the romantic idea of men fighting to defend the honor of their country, family, and way of life. Mothers and wives were able to keep in contact with their loved ones who had chosen to enlist by writing them letters. African American women, on the other hand, had experienced the breakup of families for generations and were once again dealing with this issue at the outbreak of war.

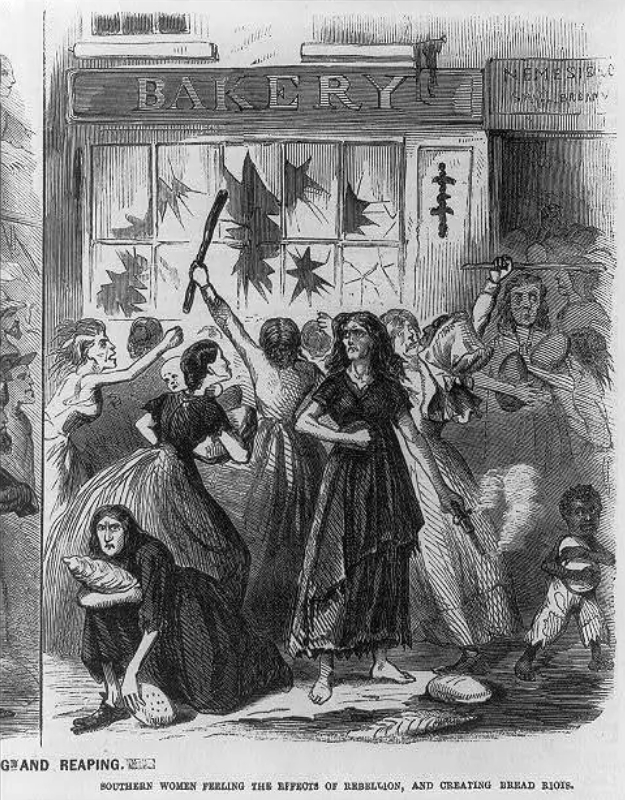
Richmond bread riot, 1863

By summer 1861, the Union naval blockade virtually shut down the export of cotton and the import of manufactured goods. Food that formerly came overland was cut off.

Women had charge of making do. They cut back on purchases, brought out old spinning wheels and enlarged their gardens with peas and peanuts to provide clothing and food. They used ersatz substitutes when possible, but there was no real coffee and it was hard to develop a taste for the okra or chicory substitutes used. The households were severely hurt by inflation in the cost of everyday items and the shortages of food, fodder for the animals, and medical supplies for the wounded. The Georgia legislature imposed cotton quotas, making it a crime to grow an excess. But food shortages only worsened, especially in the towns.

The overall decline in food supplies, made worse by the collapsing transportation system, led to serious shortages and high prices in urban areas. When bacon reached a dollar a pound in 1863, the poor women of Richmond, Atlanta and many other cities began to riot; they broke into shops and warehouses to seize food. The women expressed their anger at ineffective state relief efforts, speculators, merchants and planters. As wives and widows of soldiers they were hurt by the inadequate welfare system.

=== Postwar South ===
About 250,000 Southern soldiers never came home, or 30% of all white men aged 18 to 40 in 1860. Widows who were overwhelmed often abandoned the farm and merged into the households of relatives, or even became refugees living in camps with high rates of disease and death. In the Old South, being an "old maid" was something of an embarrassment to the woman and her family. Now it became almost a norm. Some women welcomed the freedom of not having to marry. Divorce, while never fully accepted, became more common. The concept of the "New Woman" emerged—she was self-sufficient, independent, and stood in sharp contrast to the "Southern Belle" of antebellum lore.

The work patterns of elite white women changed radically after the Civil War, depending on their stage in the life cycle. Women over age 50 changed least, insisting that they needed servants and continuing their traditional managerial roles. The next generation, comprising the young wives and mothers during the Civil War, depended much less on black servants, and displayed greater flexibility toward household work. The youngest generation, which matured during the war and Reconstruction, did many of their own domestic chores. Some sought paid jobs outside the household, especially in teaching, which allowed an escape from domestic chores and obligatory marriage.

=== Settling the Great Plains ===
The arrival of the railroads in the 1870s open up the Great Plains for settlement, for now it was possible to ship wheat and other crops at low cost to the urban markets in the East, and Europe. Immigrants poured in, especially from Germany and Scandinavia. On the plains, very few single men attempted to operate a farm or ranch by themselves; they clearly understood the need for a hard-working wife, and numerous children, to handle the many chores, including child-rearing, feeding and clothing the family, managing the housework, feeding the hired hands, and, especially after the 1930s, handling the paperwork and financial details. During the early years of settlement in the late 19th century, farm women played an integral role in assuring family survival by working outdoors. After a generation or so, women increasingly left the fields, thus redefining their roles within the family. New conveniences such as sewing and washing machines encouraged women to turn to domestic roles. The scientific housekeeping movement, promoted across the land by the farm magazines and (after 1914) by government extension agents, as well as county fairs which featured achievements in home cookery and canning, advice columns for women in the farm papers, and home economics courses in the schools.

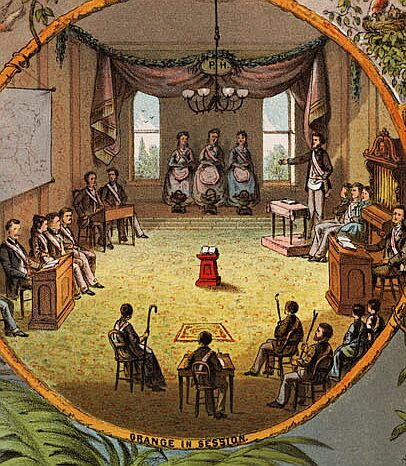
Grange in session, 1873

Although the eastern image of farm life in the prairies emphasized the isolation of the lonely farmer and farm wife, supposedly with few neighbors within range. In reality, they created a rich social life for themselves. They often sponsored activities that combined work, food, and entertainment such as barn raisings, corn huskings, quilting bees, Grange meetings, church activities, and school functions. The womenfolk organized shared meals and potluck events, as well as extended visits between families. The Grange was a nationwide farmers' organization; it reserved high offices for women, gave them a voice in public affairs, and promoted equality and suffrage.

=== Suffrage ===
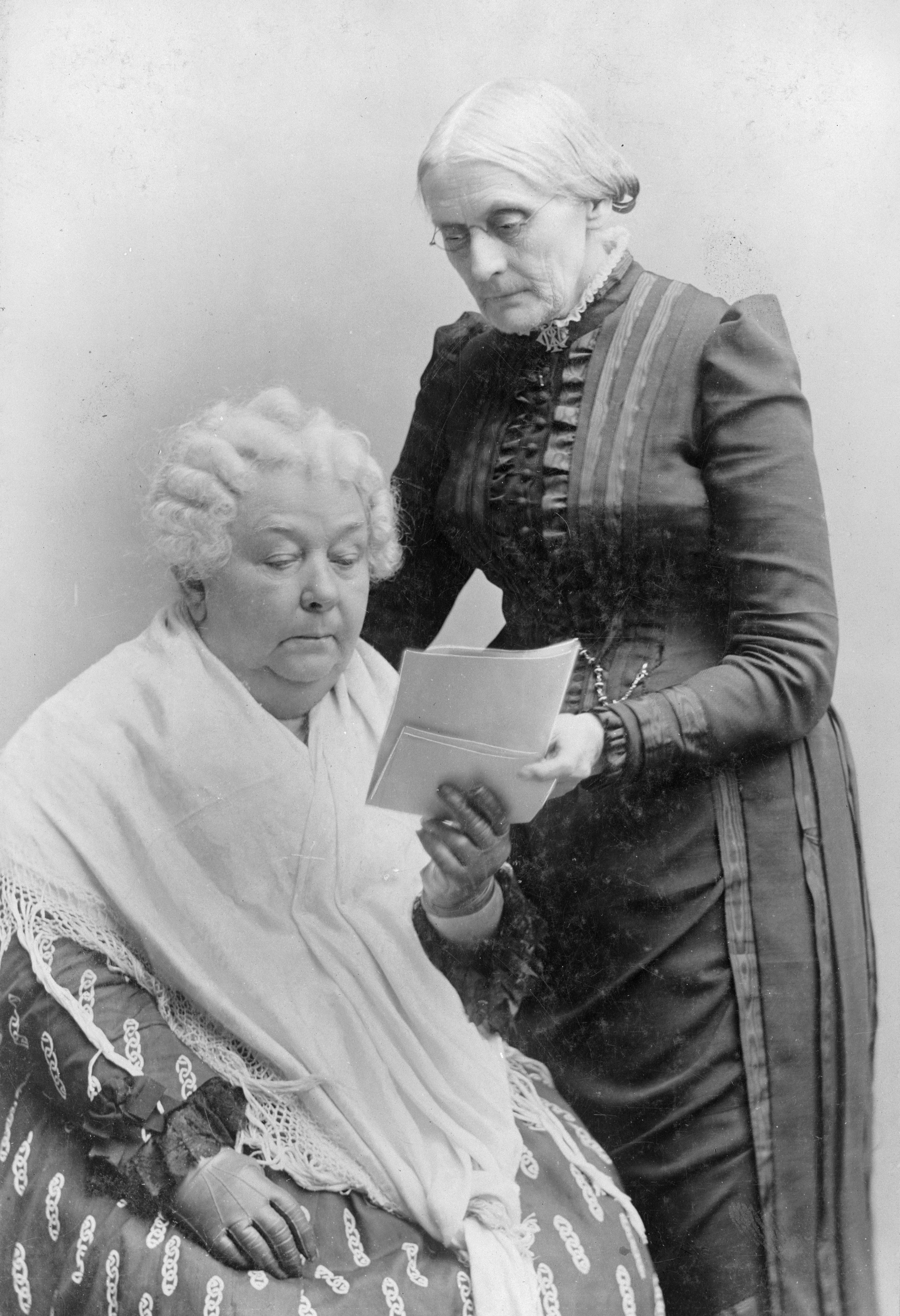
Elizabeth Cady Stanton (seated) and Susan B. Anthony

The women's suffrage movement began with the 1848 Seneca Falls Convention; many of the activists became politically aware during the abolitionist movement. The movement reorganized after the Civil War, gaining experienced campaigners, many of whom had worked for prohibition in the Women's Christian Temperance Union. By the end of the 19th century a few western states had granted women full voting rights, though women had made significant legal victories, gaining rights in areas such as property and child custody.

In 1866, Elizabeth Cady Stanton and Susan B. Anthony formed the American Equal Rights Association, an organization for white and black women and men dedicated to the goal of suffrage for all. In 1868, the Fourteenth Amendment was passed, this was the first Amendment to ever specify the voting population as "male". In 1869, the women's rights movement split into two factions as a result of disagreements over the Fourteenth and soon-to-be-passed Fifteenth Amendments, with the two factions not reuniting until 1890. Elizabeth Cady Stanton and Susan B. Anthony formed the more radical, New York-based National Woman Suffrage Association (NWSA). Lucy Stone, Henry Blackwell, and Julia Ward Howe organized the more conservative American Woman Suffrage Association (AWSA), which was centered in Boston. In 1870, the Fifteenth Amendment enfranchised black men. NWSA refused to work for its ratification, arguing, instead, that it be "scrapped" in favor of a Sixteenth Amendment providing universal suffrage. Frederick Douglass broke with Stanton and Anthony over NWSA's position.

In 1869, Wyoming became the first territory or state in America to grant women suffrage. In 1870, Louisa Ann Swain became the first woman in the United States to vote in a general election. She cast her ballot on September 6, 1870, in Laramie, Wyoming.

From 1870 to 1875 several women, including Virginia Louisa Minor, Victoria Woodhull, and Myra Bradwell, attempted to use the Fourteenth Amendment in the courts to secure the vote (Minor and Woodhull) or the right to practice law (Bradwell), but they were all unsuccessful. In 1872, Susan B. Anthony was arrested and brought to trial in Rochester, New York, for attempting to vote for Ulysses S. Grant in the presidential election; she was convicted and fined $100 and the costs of her prosecution but refused to pay. At the same time, Sojourner Truth appeared at a polling booth in Battle Creek, Michigan, demanding a ballot; she was turned away. Also in 1872, Victoria Woodhull became the first woman to run for President, although she could not vote and only received a few votes, losing to Ulysses S. Grant. She was nominated to run by the Equal Rights Party, and advocated the 8-hour work day, graduated income tax, social welfare programs, and profit sharing, among other positions. Victoria Woodhull was an activist for women's rights and advocated for " Free Love" which focused on the right to marriage, divorce and child birth The double standards of men and their will was strong to keep women powerless. In addition, to resisting full equality between race and gender. It was an era of battling for what one believed and should be entitled to. Victoria Woodhull fought for her universal rights and took advantage of the amendments in her favor. Tensions were high during 1872, it was a pivotal year in Reconstruction politics and the death of radical republicanism in national politics. As nominees of The Equal Rights Party, Woodhull and Fredrick Douglas, provided a provocative campaign as the deliberately challenged the fear of miscegenation and gender bias. They restored hope and universal rights for everyone regardless of gender and race as well as offered to reunite divided reformers. Although Woodhull did not win election, her election demanded new political views and equal rights for everyone. In 1874, The Woman's Christian Temperance Union (WCTU) was founded by Annie Wittenmyer to work for the prohibition of alcohol; with Frances Willard at its head (starting in 1876), the WCTU also became an important force in the fight for women's suffrage. In 1878, a woman suffrage amendment was first introduced in the United States Congress, but it did not pass.

=== Domesticity ===
Kristin Hoganson's essay 'Cosmopolitan Domesticity: Importing the American Dream, 1865–1920' sets out how 'bourgeois American women, in their capacity as homemakers, participated in international relations'. After the Civil War, there was a boom in interior design writing, with many advocating the adoption of foreign styles throughout the household. Interior design in middle-class houses was seen at this time as an important means of self-expression, shown by the fact that a popular design manual commented that 'We judge her [a woman's] temperament, her habits, her inclinations, by the interior of her home'. Pre-war, foreign styles were usually limited to the European fashions, but in the second half of the century, objects were being imported from further afield. Women wanted to show their status through the extravagant interior design of their homes, but as Kristin Hoganson points out, 'their decision to do so through exhibiting imported objects and replicating distant styles illuminates something beyond local jostling'. The increasingly expansionist nature of U.S. foreign policy post-civil war contributed to the level of interest in cosmopolitan interior design, as it led to an increased geographical awareness amongst the middle classes of America through travel writings, photographs, missionary exhibits, etc. Moreover, it was not just tourists who were bringing foreign goods and ideas back to America; it was also via missionaries, professionals, businessmen, servicemen and government agents.

=== Cult of Domesticity ===
The "Cult of Domesticity" was a new ideal of womanhood that emerged at this time. This ideal rose from the reality that a 19th-century middle-class family did not have to make what it needed in order to survive, as previous families had to, and therefore men could now work in jobs that produced goods or services while their wives and children stayed at home. The ideal woman became one who stayed at home and taught children how to be proper citizens. American Cookery written in 1796 by Amelia Simmons, was the first published cookbook written by an American. It was popular and was published in many editions.

The culture of honor in the antebellum South was linked to women's social status and Southern evangelicalism. There were no sharp gender lines such that women strictly inhabited the realm of evangelicalism while men upheld honor. Women felt subject to notions of honor related to patriarchy, sexuality, class identity, and virtue. The different sex roles inhabited by Southern men and women affected masculine and feminine honor, as is the moral authority women held over men.

=== Jobs and professions ===
Many young women worked as servants or in shops and factories until marriage, then typically became full-time housewives. However black, Irish and Swedish adult women often worked as servants. After 1860, as the larger cities opened department stores, middle-class women did most of the shopping; increasingly they were served by young middle-class women clerks. Typically, most young women quit their jobs when they married. In some ethnic groups, however, married women were encouraged to work, especially among African-Americans, and Irish Catholics. When the husband operated a small shop or restaurant, wives and other family members could find employment there. Widows and deserted wives often operated boarding houses. However, despite this, the unemployment rate amongst black women in the Southern states remained high peaking at 80% in 1900.

Career women were few. The teaching profession had once been heavily male, but as schooling expanded many women took on teaching careers. If they remained unmarried they could have a prestigious, poorly paying lifetime career. At the end of the period nursing schools opened up new opportunities for women, but medical schools remained nearly all male.

Business opportunities were very rare, unless it was a matter of a widow taking over her late husband's small business. However the rapid acceptance of the sewing machine made housewives more productive and opened up new careers for women running their own small millinery and dressmaking shops.

American women achieved several firsts in the professions in the second half of the 1800s. In 1866, Lucy Hobbs Taylor became the first American woman to receive a dentistry degree. In 1878, Mary L. Page became the first woman in America to earn a degree in architecture when she graduated from the University of Illinois at Urbana-Champaign. In 1879, Belva Lockwood became the first woman allowed to argue before the Supreme Court; the first case in which she did so was the 1880 case Kaiser v. Stickney. Arabella Mansfield had previously become America's first female lawyer when she was admitted to the bar in 1869. In 1891, Marie Owens, born in Canada, was hired in Chicago as`America's first female police officer. Due to women's greater involvement in law and law enforcement, in 1871 the first state laws specifically making wife beating illegal were passed, though proliferation of laws to all states and adequate enforcement of those laws lagged very far behind. One of the first female photojournalists, Sadie Kneller Miller used her initials, SKM, as a byline, which hid her gender. She covered sports, disasters, diseases, and was recognized as the first female war correspondent.

=== Missionaries ===
By the 1860s Most of the large Protestant denominations developed missionary roles for women beyond that of the wife of a male missionary.

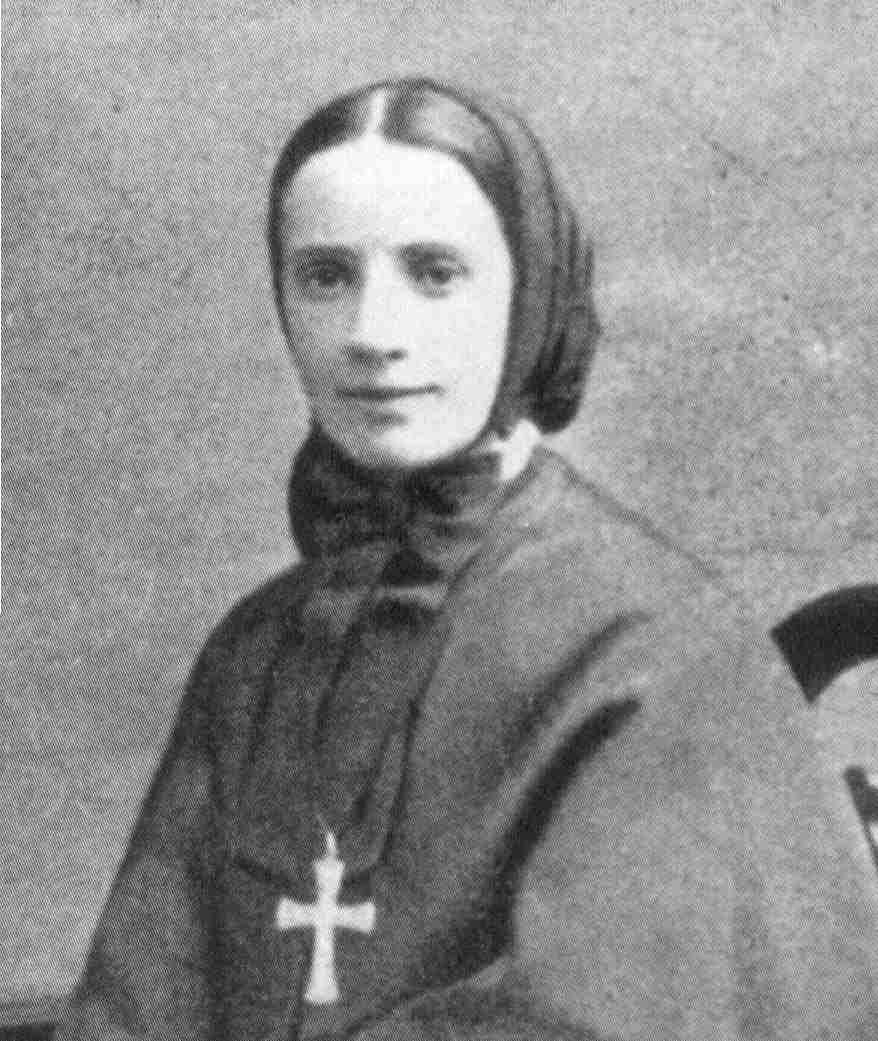
Mother Cabrini

European Catholic women in their role as religious sisters worked in the immigrant enclaves of American cities. Mother Cabrini (1850–1917) founded the Missionary Sisters of the Sacred Heart of Jesus in Italy in 1880; she moved to New York in 1889. The orphanages, schools and hospitals built by her order provided major support to the Italian immigrants. She was canonized as a saint in 1946.

=== Settlement houses ===
In 1889, Jane Addams and Ellen Gates Starr established the first settlement house in America (a settlement house is a center in an underprivileged area that provides community services), in what was then a dilapidated mansion in one of the poorest immigrant slums of Chicago on the corner of Halstead and Polk streets. This settlement house, called Hull House, provided numerous activities and services including health and child care, clubs for both children and adults, an art gallery, kitchen, gymnasium, music school, theater, library, employment bureau, and a labor museum. By 1910, 400 settlement houses had been established in America; the majority of settlement house workers were women.

=== Nursing ===
During the Spanish–American War (1898) thousands of US soldiers sick with typhoid, malaria, and yellow fever overwhelmed the capabilities of the Army Medical Department, so Dr. Anita Newcomb McGee suggested to the Army Surgeon General that the Daughters of the American Revolution (DAR) be appointed to select professionally qualified nurses to serve under contract to the US Army. Before the war ended, 1,500 civilian contract nurses were assigned to Army hospitals in the US, Hawaii (not a state at that time), Cuba, Puerto Rico, Guam and the Philippines, as well as to the hospital ship Relief. Twenty nurses died. The Army appointed Dr. McGee as Acting Assistant Surgeon General, making her the first woman ever to hold the position. The Army was impressed by the performance of its contract nurses and had Dr. McGee write legislation creating a permanent corps of Army nurses.

== Progressive era: 1900–1940 ==
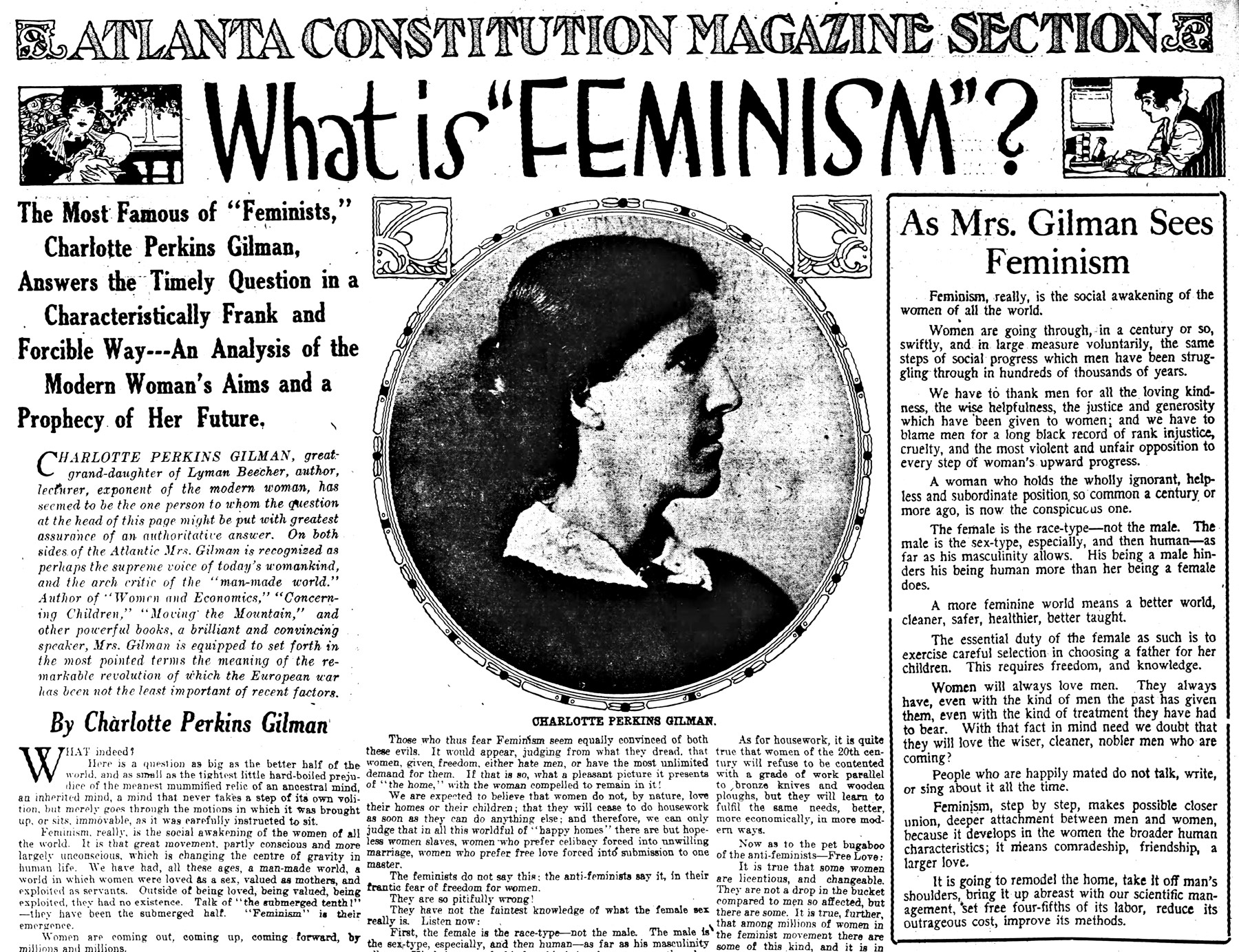
Charlotte Perkins Gilman (pictured) wrote these articles about feminism for the Atlanta Constitution, published on December 10, 1916.

Across the nation, middle-class women organized on behalf of social reforms during the Progressive Era. They were especially concerned with Prohibition, suffrage, school issues, and public health. Focusing on the General Federation of Women's Clubs, a national network of middle-class women who formed local clubs, historian Paige Meltzer puts the women's clubs in the context of the Progressive Movement, arguing that its policies:

built on Progressive-era strategies of municipal housekeeping. During the Progressive era, female activists used traditional constructions of womanhood, which imagined all women as mothers and homemakers, to justify their entrance into community affairs: as "municipal housekeepers," they would clean up politics, cities, and see after the health and wellbeing of their neighbors. Donning the mantle of motherhood, female activists methodically investigated their community's needs and used their "maternal" expertise to lobby, create, and secure a place for themselves in an emerging state welfare bureaucracy, best illustrated perhaps by clubwoman Julia Lathrop's leadership in the Children's Bureau. As part of this tradition of maternal activism, the Progressive-era General Federation supported a range of causes from the pure food and drug administration to public health care for mothers and children to a ban on child labor, each of which looked to the state to help implement their vision of social justice.

=== Jane Addams ===
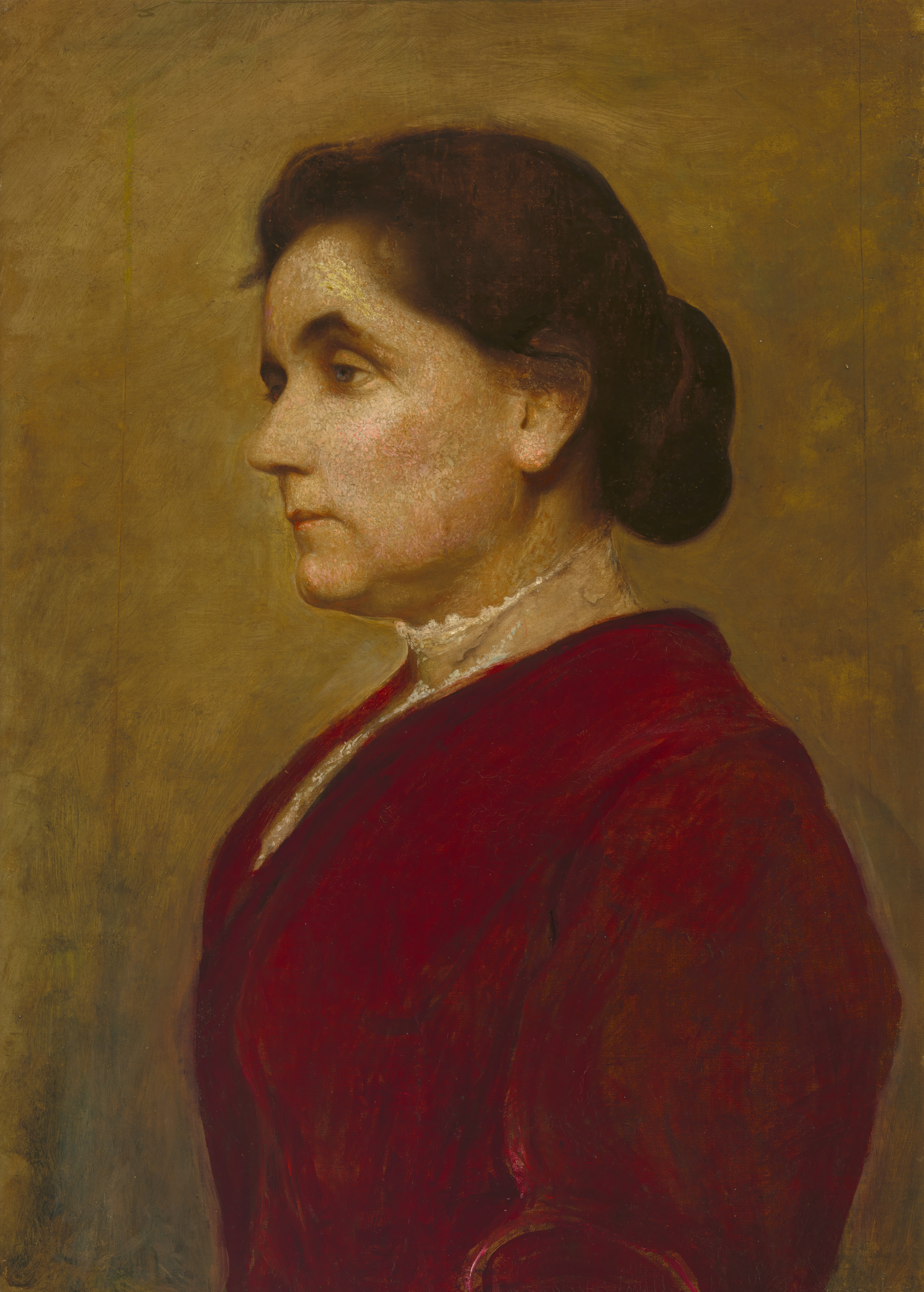
Jane Addams, 1860-1935

One representative woman of the Progressive Era was Jane Addams (1860–1935). She was a pioneer social worker, leader of community activists at Hull House in Chicago, public philosopher, sociologist, author, and spokesperson for suffrage and world peace. Alongside presidents Theodore Roosevelt and Woodrow Wilson, she was the most prominent reformer of the Progressive Era. She helped turn the nation's attention to issues of concern to mothers, such as the needs of children, public health, and world peace. She said that if women were to be responsible for cleaning up their communities and making them better places to live, they needed the vote to be effective in doing so. Addams became a role model for middle-class women who volunteered to uplift their communities. In 1931, she became the first American woman to be awarded the Nobel Peace Prize. Some critics in the 1960s portrayed her as an unoriginal racist determined to civilize helpless immigrants while other biographers in the 1990s tended to regard her more favorably.

=== French Canadians ===
French Canadian women saw New England as a place of opportunity and possibility where they could create economic alternatives for themselves distinct from the expectations of their subsistence farms in Quebec. By the early 20th century some saw temporary migration to the United States to work as a rite of passage and a time of self-discovery and self-reliance. Most moved permanently to the United States, using the inexpensive railroad system to visit Quebec from time to time. When these women did marry, they had fewer children with longer intervals between children than their Canadian counterparts. Some women never married, and oral accounts suggest that self-reliance and economic independence were important reasons for choosing work over marriage and motherhood. These women conformed to traditional gender ideals in order to retain their 'Canadienne' cultural identity, but they also redefined these roles in ways that provided them increased independence in their roles as wives and mothers.

=== Midwest ===
Most young urban women took jobs before marriage, then quit. Before the growth of high schools after 1900, most women left school after the eighth grade aged around fifteen. Ciani (2005) shows that type of work they did reflected their ethnicity and marital status. African-American mothers often chose day labor, usually as domestic servants, because of the flexibility it afforded. Most mothers receiving pensions were white and sought work only when necessary.

Across the region, middle-class society women shaped numerous new and expanded charitable and professional associations, and promoted mother's pensions, and expanded forms of social welfare. Many of the Protestant homemakers were active in the temperance and suffrage movements as well. In Detroit, the Federation of Women's Clubs (DFWC) promoted a very wide range of activities for civic-minded middle-class women who conformed to traditional gender roles. The Federation argued that safety and health issues were of greatest concern to mothers and could only be solved by improving municipal conditions outside the home. The Federation pressured Detroit officials to upgrade schools, water supplies and sanitation facilities, and to require safe food handling, and traffic safety. However, the membership was divided on going beyond these issues or collaborating with ethnic or groups or labor unions. Its refusal to stretch traditional gender boundaries, gave it a conservative reputation in the working-class. Before the 1930s, the women's affiliates of labor unions were too small and weak to fill the gap.

=== South ===
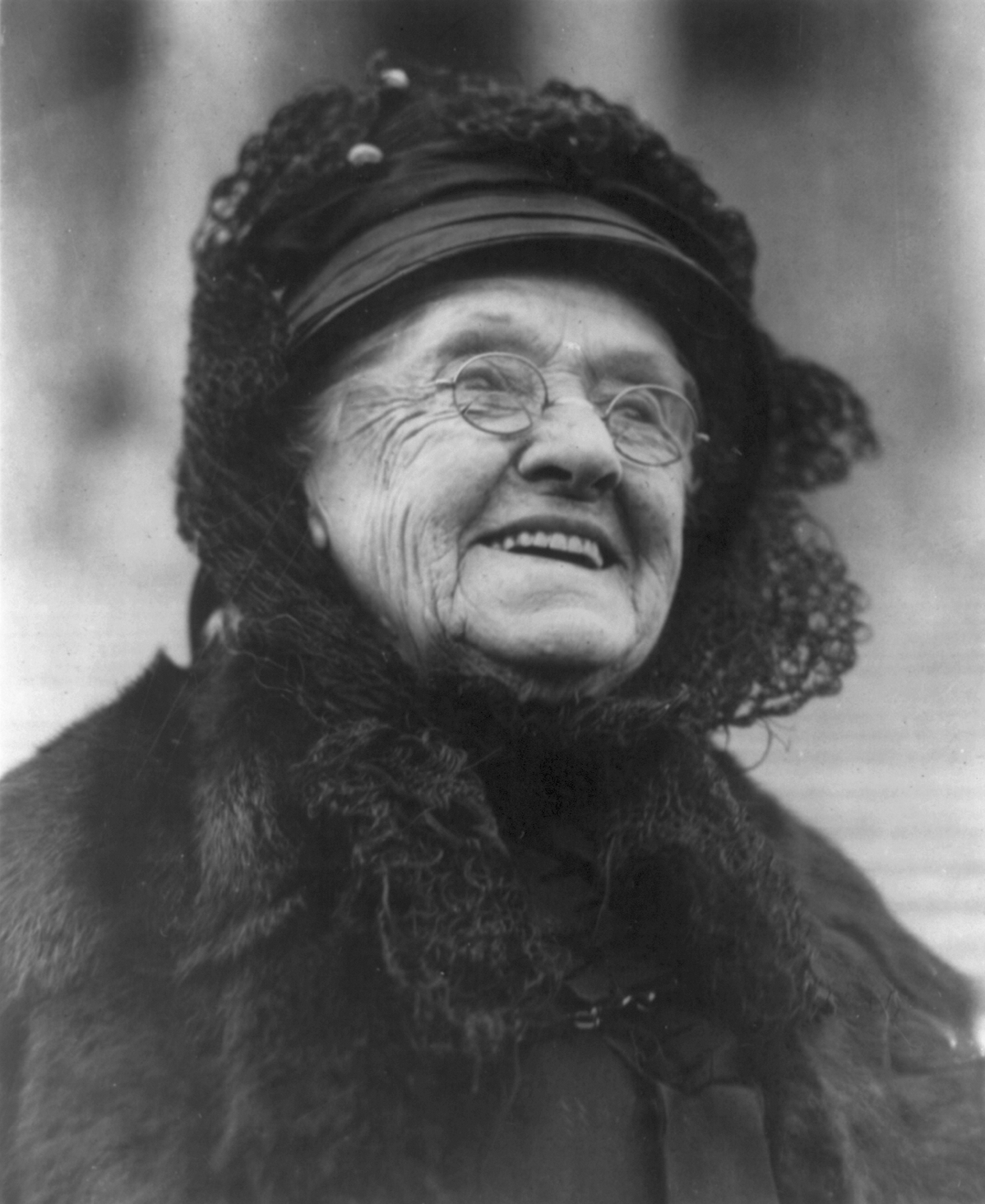
Rebecca Latimer Felton, the first woman in the U.S. Senate

Rebecca Latimer Felton (1835–1930) was the most prominent woman leader in Georgia. Born into a wealthy plantation family, she married an active politician, managed his career, and became a political expert. An outspoken feminist, she became a leader of the prohibition and woman's suffrage movements, endorsed lynching (white Southerners should "lynch a thousand [black men] a week if it becomes necessary" to prevent the rape of white women), fought for reform of prisons, and filled leadership roles in many reform organizations. In 1922, she was appointed to the U.S. Senate. She was sworn in on November 21, 1922, and served one day; she was the first woman to serve in the Senate.

Although middle class urban women were well-organized supporters of suffrage, the rural areas of the South were hostile. The state legislatures ignored efforts to let women vote in local elections. Georgia not only refused to ratify the Federal Nineteenth Amendment, but took pride in being the first to reject it. The Amendment passed nationally and Georgia women gained the right to vote in 1920. However, black women, as well as black men, continued to face substantial barriers designed to prevent black Americans from voting until the passage of the federal Voting Rights Act of 1965 enforced their constitutional rights.

The woman's reform movement flourished in cities; however the South was still heavily rural before 1945. In Dallas, Texas, women reformers did much to establish the fundamental elements of the social structure of the city, focusing their energies on families, schools, and churches during the city's pioneer days. Many of the organizations which created a modern urban scene were founded and led by middle-class women. Through voluntary organizations and club work, they connected their city to national cultural and social trends. By the 1880s women in temperance and suffrage movements shifted the boundaries between private and public life in Dallas by pushing their way into politics in the name of social issues.

During 1913–19, advocates of woman suffrage in Dallas drew on the educational and advertising techniques of the national parties and the lobbying tactics of the women's club movement. They also tapped into popular culture, successfully using popular symbolism and traditional ideals to adapt community festivals and social gatherings to the task of political persuasion. The Dallas Equal Suffrage Association developed a suffrage campaign based on social values and community standards. Community and social occasions served as recruiting opportunities for the suffrage cause, blunting its radical implications with the familiarity of customary events and dressing it in the values of traditional female behavior, especially propriety.

Black female reformers usually operated separately. Juanita Craft was a leader in the Texas civil rights movement through the Dallas NAACP. She focused on working with black youths, organizing them as the vanguard in protests against segregation practices in Texas.

=== West ===
The Progressive movement was especially strong in California, where it aimed to purify society of its corruption, and one way was to enfranchise supposedly "pure" women as voters in 1911, nine years before the 19th Amendment enfranchised women nationally in 1920. Women's clubs flourished and turned a spotlight on issues such as public schools, dirt and pollution, and public health. California women were leaders in the temperance movement, moral reform, conservation, public schools, recreation, and other issues. The women did not often run for office—that was seen as entangling their purity in the inevitable backroom deals routine in politics.

=== Health issues ===
Bristow shows there was a gendered response of health caregivers to the 1918 flu pandemic that killed over 500,000 Americans. Male doctors were unable to cure the patients, and they felt like failures. Women nurses also saw their patients die, but they took pride in their success in fulfilling their professional role of caring for, ministering, comforting, and easing the last hours of their patients, and helping the families of the patients cope as well.

==== Birth control ====
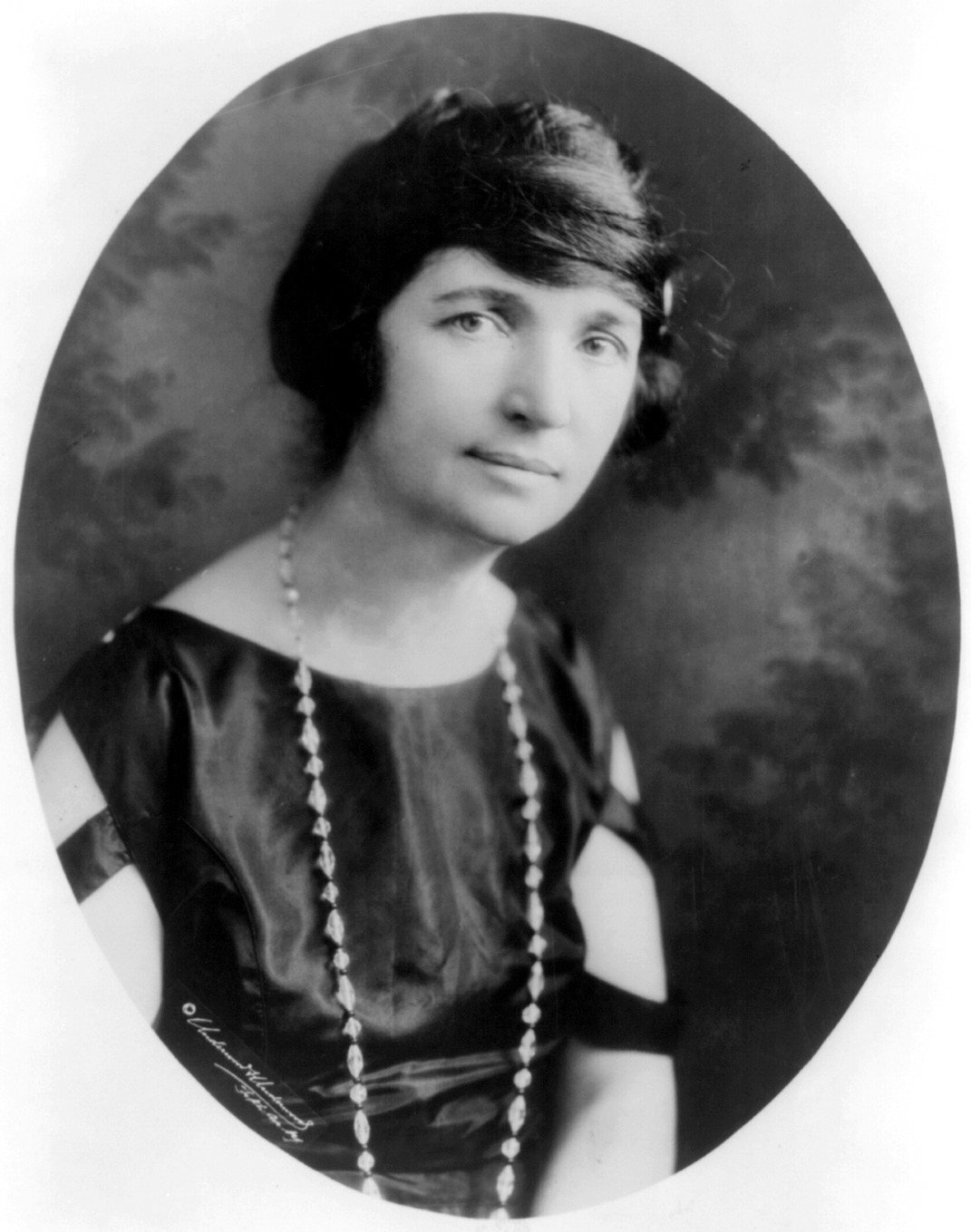
Margaret Sanger

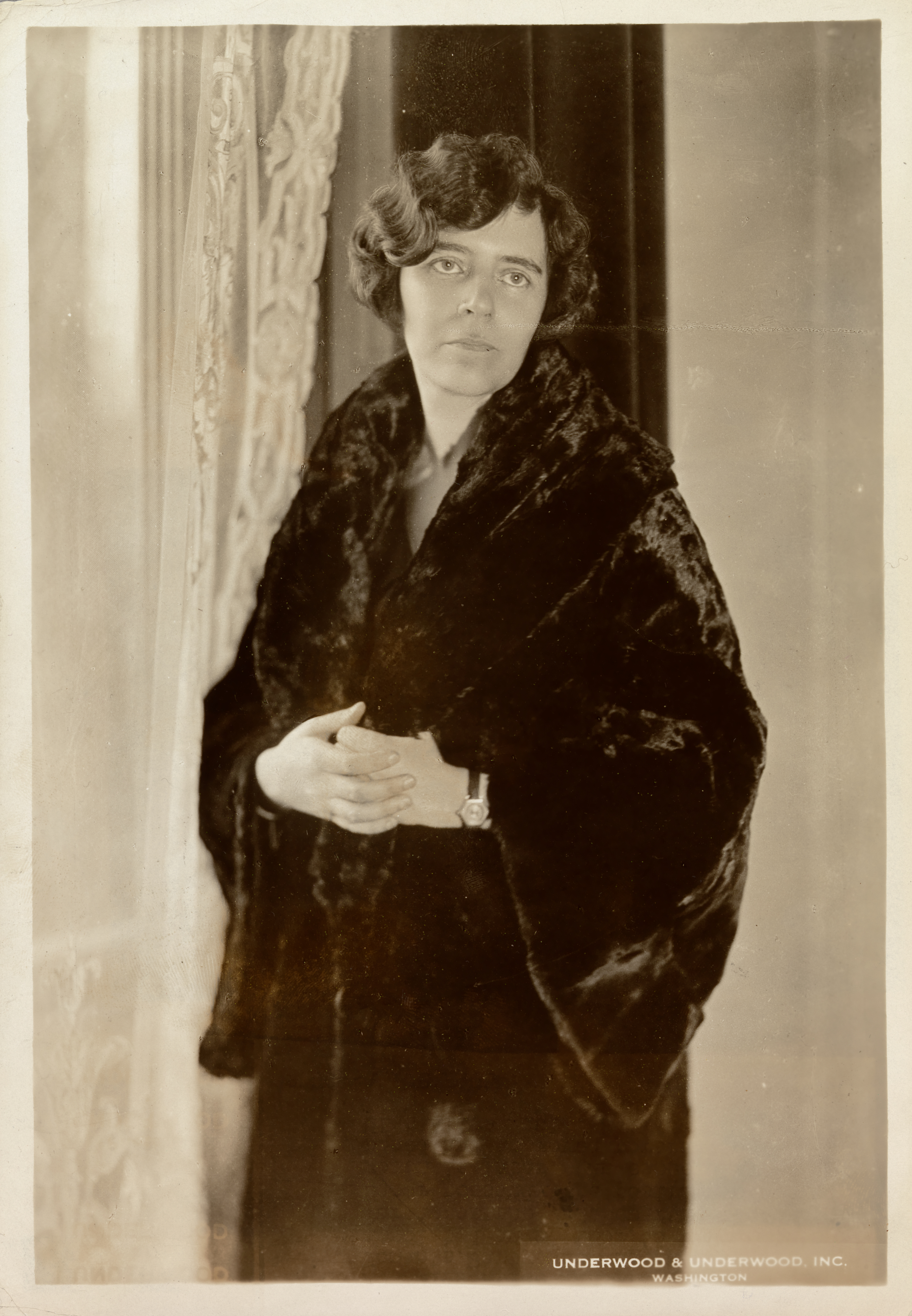
Alice Paul, 1885–1977

In March 1873, the United States Congress passed the Comstock Act, which made it illegal to distribute birth control information or contraceptives through the U.S. postal system. Margaret Sanger was an influential campaigner for birth control rights, specifically for poor women, in the 1910s. She originally worked as a visiting nurse in the New York City's tenements and wrote about sex education and women's health. In 1914, Sanger's articles in "The Woman Radical" brought her a federal indictment for violating the Comstock Act (which since 1873 had banned the mailing of birth control devices and information on birth control devices, sexually transmitted diseases, human sexuality, and abortion). Sanger and her sister Ethel Byrne, also a nurse, opened the first birth control clinic in the United States in 1916, modeled after those Sanger had seen in the Netherlands. The police quickly closed it down but the publicity surrounding Sanger's activities had made birth control a matter of public debate. In 1936, Margaret Sanger helped bring the case United States v. One Package to the U.S. Circuit Court of Appeals. The decision in that case allowed physicians in New York, Connecticut, and Vermont to legally mail birth control devices and information to married people. For unmarried people, the dissemination of birth control did not become legal until the 1972 Supreme Court decision Eisenstadt v. Baird.

=== Suffrage ===
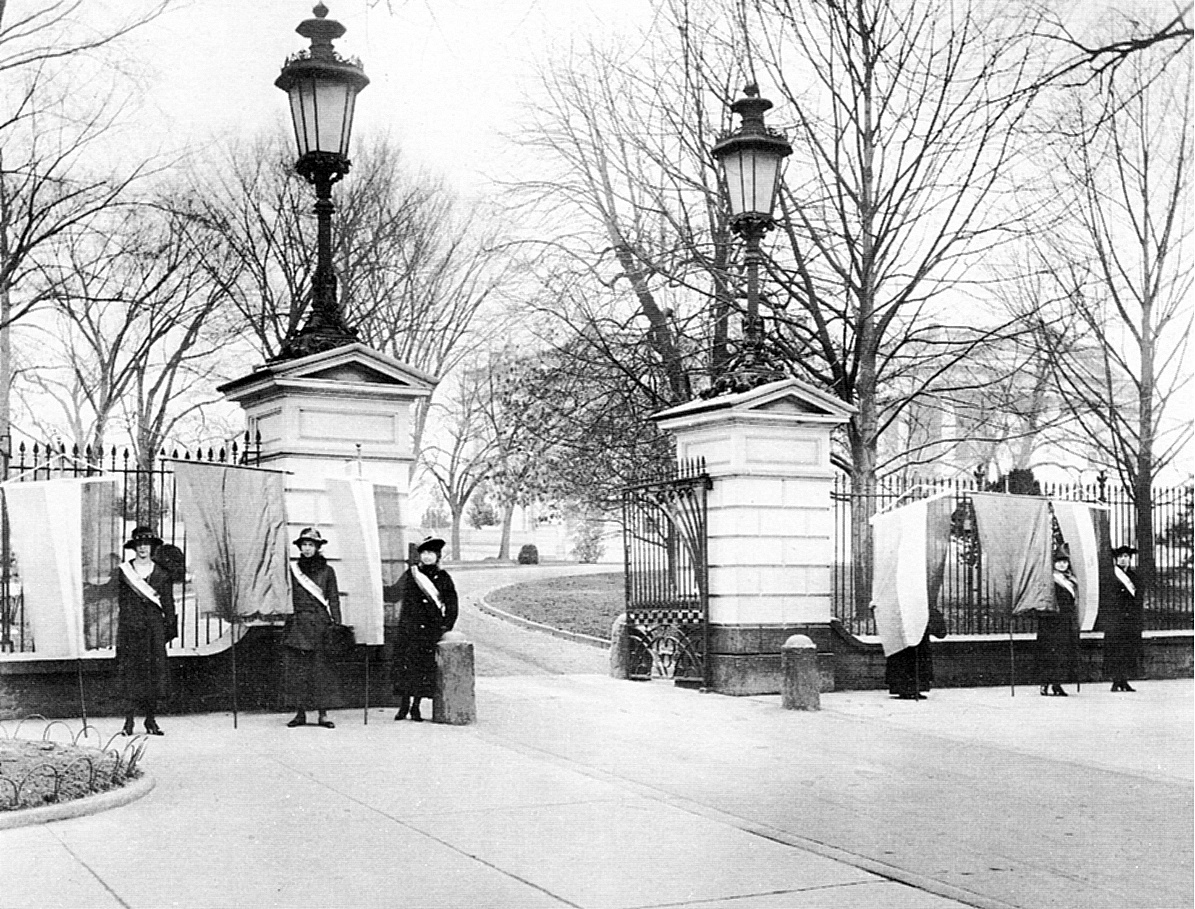
Suffragists calling themselves the Silent Sentinels picketing in front of the White House.

The campaign for women's suffrage picked up speed in the 1910s as the established women's groups won in the western states and moved east, leaving the conservative South for last. Parades were favorite publicity devices. In 1916, Jeannette Rankin, a Republican from Montana, was elected to Congress and became the first woman to serve in any high federal office. A lifelong pacifist, she was one of fifty members of Congress who voted against entry into World War I in 1917, and the only member of Congress who voted against declaring war on Japan after the attack on Pearl Harbor in 1941. Alice Paul was the leader of a voting rights movement that courted arrest through nonviolent protests to publicize the injustice of denying women the vote. After 1920, Paul spent a half century as leader of the National Woman's Party, which advocated for her Equal Rights Amendment to secure constitutional equality for women. It never passed, but she won a large degree of success with the inclusion of women as a group protected against discrimination by the Civil Rights Act of 1964. She insisted that her National Woman's Party focus exclusively on the legal status of all women and resisted calls to address issues like birth control.

=== International activity ===
Women's support for international missionary activity peaked in the 1900 to 1930 era. The Great Depression caused a dramatic cut back in funding for missions. Mainstream denominations generally transitioned to support for locally controlled missions.

Black women increased their role in international women's conferences and their independent travels abroad. Leaders, including Ida B. Wells, Hallie Quinn Brown, and Mary Church Terrell, addressed issues of American race and gender discrimination when they traveled abroad. The International Council of Women of the Darker Races brought together women of color to eliminate language, cultural, and regional barriers.

==== Peace movement ====
Jane Addams was a noted peace activist who founded the Woman's Peace Party in 1915; it was the American branch of the Women's International League for Peace and Freedom, of which Addams was the first president in 1915. Addams received the Nobel Peace Prize in 1931.

=== World War I ===
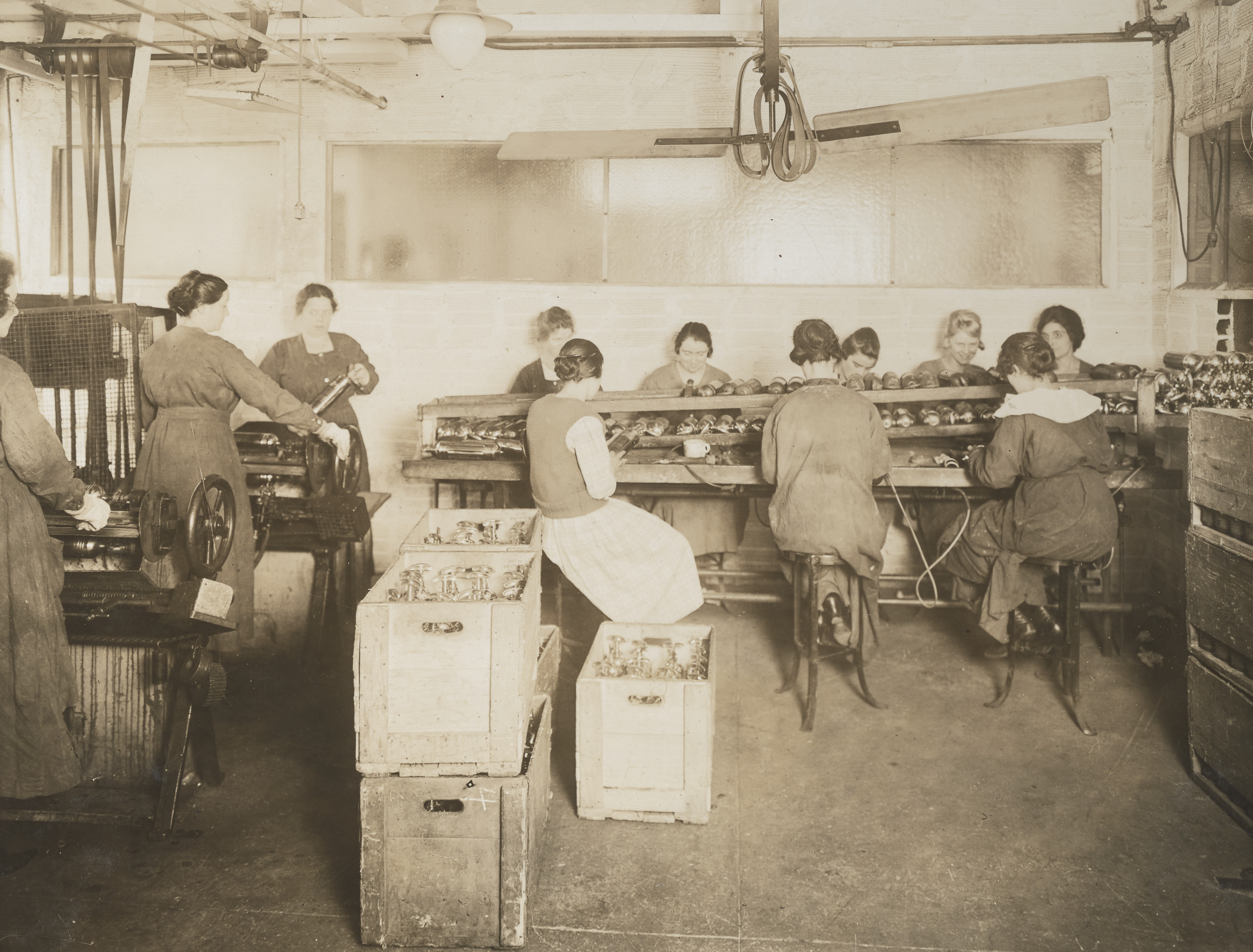
Women working in a factory during the World War I

World War I was a total war, and the nation moved to mobilize its women for material and psychological support of the war effort in and out of the home. All the states organized women's committees. Representative was the women's state committee in North Carolina. Motivated by the public service ideals of the Progressive Movement, it registered women for many volunteer services, promoted increased food production, and the elimination of wasteful cooking practices, helped maintain social services, worked to bolster moral well-being of white and black soldiers, improved public health and public schools, encouraged black participation in its programs, and helped with the devastating Spanish flu epidemic that struck worldwide in late 1918, with very high fatalities. The committee was generally successful in reaching middle-class white and black women, but it was handicapped by the condescension of male lawmakers, limited funding, and tepid responses from women on the farms and working-class districts.

Women served in the military as nurses, and in support roles. Tens of thousands were employed in the United States, and thousands more in France. The Army Nurse Corps (all female until 1955) was founded in 1901, and the Navy Nurse Corps (all female until 1964) was founded in 1908, and nurses in both served overseas at military hospitals during the war. During the course of the war, 21,480 Army nurses served in military hospitals in the United States and overseas and eighteen African-American Army nurses served stateside caring for German prisoners of war (POWs) and African-American soldiers. More than 1,476 Navy nurses served in military hospitals stateside and overseas. More than 400 military nurses died in the line of duty during World War I; the vast majority of these women died from a highly contagious form of influenza known as the "Spanish Flu," which swept through crowded military camps and hospitals and ports of embarkation. In 1917, women were first able to join the Navy for jobs other than nurse; they were able to become yeomen, electricians (radio operators), and any other ratings necessary to the naval district operations. 13,000 women enlisted, and the majority became yeomen and were designated as yeoman (F) for female yeoman.

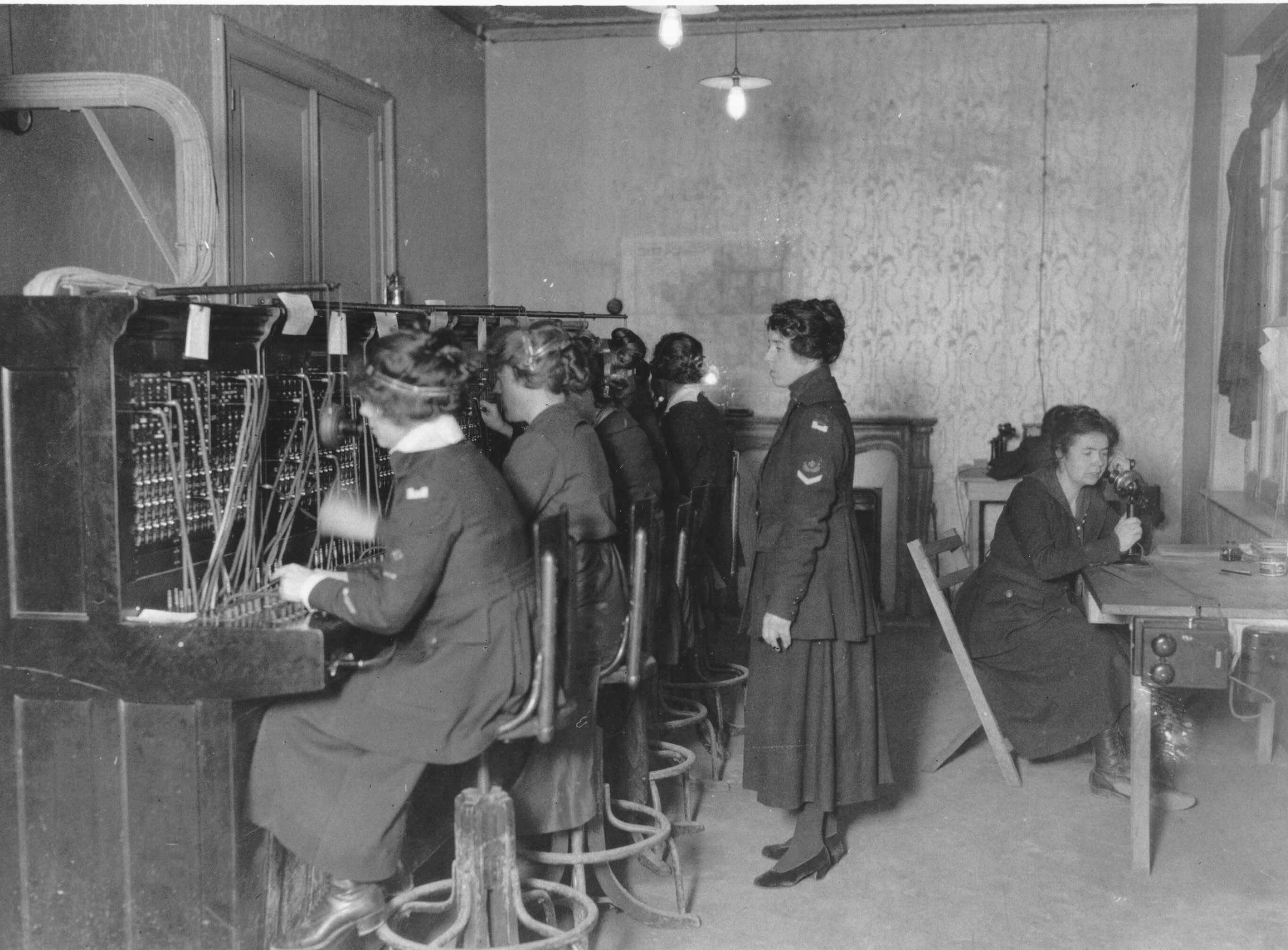
Switchboard operators in the Army Signal Corps

The Army employed 450 female telephone operators who served overseas, beginning in March 1918 and continuing until the war ended. These women, who retained their civilian status and were not officially considered veterans until 1978, were the members of the Signal Corps Female Telephone Operators Unit 25, better known as the "Hello Girls". They were required to be fluent in both French and English, and assisted the French and British, both allies of America, in communicating with each other. Over 300 women served in the Marines during World War One, performing duties within the United States so that the male Marines could fight overseas. After the war ended in 1918, American women were no longer allowed to serve in the military, except as nurses, until 1942. However, in 1920 a provision of the Army Reorganization Act granted military nurses the status of officers with "relative rank" from second lieutenant to major (but not full rights and privileges).

=== 19th amendment ===
Like most major nations, the United States gave women the right to vote at the end of the war. The 19th Amendment to the Constitution, giving American women the right to vote, passed in 1920. It came up before the House of Representatives in 1918 with the two-thirds votes needed for passage barely within reach; Representative Frederick Hicks of New York had been at the bedside of his dying wife but left at her urging to support the cause. He provided the final, crucial vote, and then returned home for her funeral. However, the Senate failed to pass the amendment that year. The amendment was approved by Congress next year on June 4, 1919, and the states started ratifying. In 1920, Tennessee was the 36th to do so, meeting the 3/4s (of then 48 states) required for enactment; the remaining states ratified later.

The amendment passed the Tennessee Senate easily. However, as it moved on to the House, vigorous opposition came from people in the liquor industry, who thought that if women got the vote, they would use it to pass Prohibition. The House ratified by one vote. It officially became part of the Constitution when it was certified as law on August 26, 1920; August 26 later became known as Women's Equality Day. Suffragist Carrie Chapman Catt calculated that the campaign for women's right to vote had involved 56 referendum campaigns directed at male voters, plus 480 campaigns to get Legislatures to submit suffrage amendments to voters, 47 campaigns to get constitutional conventions to write woman suffrage into state constitutions; 277 campaigns to get State party conventions to include woman suffrage planks, 30 campaigns to get presidential party campaigns to include woman suffrage planks in party platforms and 19 campaigns with 19 successive Congresses.

=== Black women in 1920s ===
Black women who had moved to northern cities could vote starting in 1920, and they played a new role in urban politics. In Chicago, the issue of black women voters was a competition between the middle-class women's clubs, and the black preachers. Prominent women activists in Chicago included Ida B. Wells and Ada S. McKinley, Who attracted a national audience, as well as Ella Berry, Ida Dempsey and Jennie Lawrence. By 1930, blacks comprised upwards of 1/5 of the Republican vote, and had a growing role in primary elections. For example, the Colored Women's Republican Club of Illinois Show their power in the 1928 primary, when their favorite Ruth Hanna McCormick outpolled former governor Charles S. Deneen three to one in the black wards and won the nomination for U.S. Senate. Year after year the white Republican leadership held out the hope of anti-lynching legislation, even though lynching had largely disappeared in most of the South by 1920, and in any case the votes were not there to pass it in Congress. Loyalty to the Republicans as the "party of Lincoln" persisted until the New Deal Coalition offered more opportunities for patronage and welfare in the mid-1930s. There was a class division as well, as the middle class black women reformers spoken language of utopian promise that did not ring true to the poor uneducated maids and laundry workers, who listened every Sunday to the promises of salvation from their preachers.

==== Black women in business ====
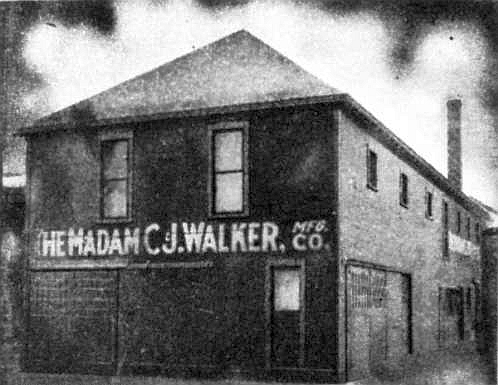
C. J. Walker Manufacturing Company, Indianapolis, 1911

Most of the African-Americans in business were men, however women played a major role especially in the area of beauty. Standards of beauty were different for whites and blacks, and the black community developed its own standards, with an emphasis on hair care. Beauticians could work out of their own homes, and did not need storefronts. As a result, black beauticians were numerous in the rural South, despite the absence of cities and towns. They pioneered the use of cosmetics, at a time when rural white women in the South avoided them. As Blain Roberts has shown, beauticians offered their clients a space to feel pampered and beautiful in the context of their own community because, "Inside black beauty shops, rituals of beautification converged with rituals of socialization." Beauty contests emerged in the 1920s, and in the white community they were linked to agricultural county fairs. By contrast in the black community, beauty contests were developed out of the homecoming ceremonies at their high schools and colleges. The most famous entrepreneur was Madame C.J. Walker (1867–1919); she built a national franchise business called Madame C.J. Walker Manufacturing Company based on her invention of the first successful hair straightening process.

=== Feminism in 1920s ===
The first wave of feminism petered out in the 1920s. After gaining suffrage, the political activities of women generally subsided or were absorbed in the main political parties. In the 1920s they paid special attention to such issues as world peace and child welfare.

The achievement of suffrage led to feminists refocusing their efforts towards other goals. Groups such as the National Women's Party (NWP) continued the political fight.. Led by Alice Paul, the group proposing the Equal Rights Amendment in 1923 and working to remove laws that used sex to discriminate against women. But many women shifted their focus from politics to challenge traditional definitions of womanhood. Carrie Chapman Catt and others established The League of Women Voters to help women carry out their new responsibilities as voters.

==== Roaring Twenties ====
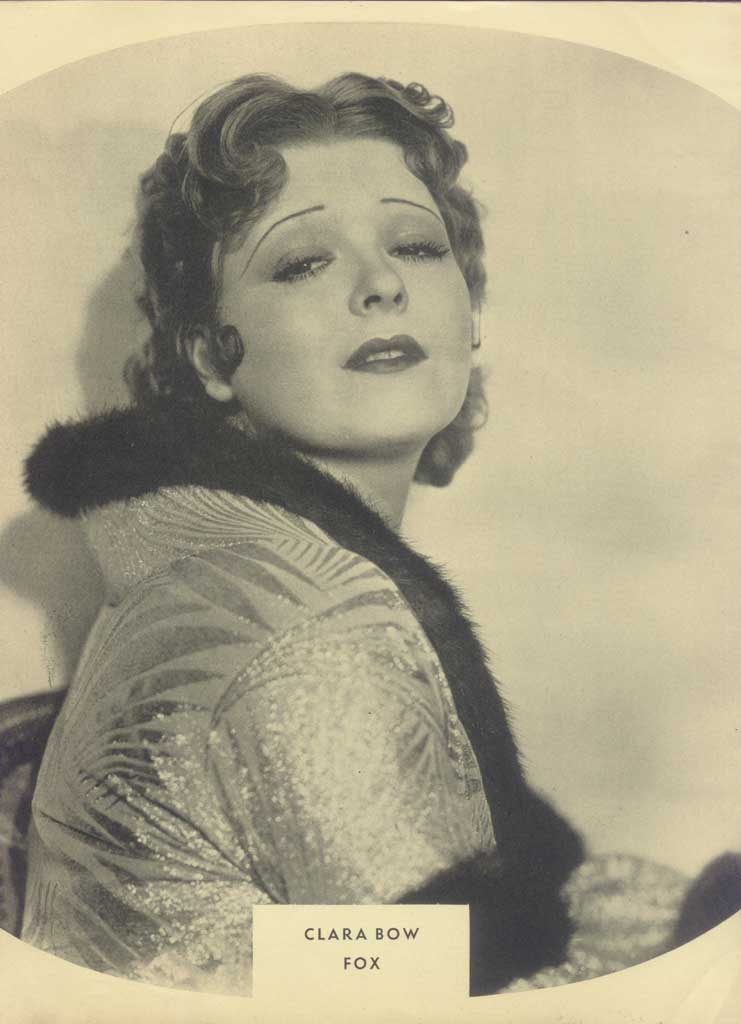
Clara Bow, a famous movie actress and "It Girl" of the 1920s, represented the new freedom to flaunt sexuality.

A generational gap began to form between the "new" women of the 1920s and older women. Prior to the 19th Amendment, feminists commonly thought that women could not pursue both a career and a family successfully, believing that one would inherently inhibit the development of the other. This mentality began to change in the 1920s as more women began to desire not only successful careers of their own but also families. The "new" woman was less invested in social service than the Progressive generations, and in tune with the capitalistic spirit of the era, she was eager to compete and to find personal fulfilment.

The 1920s saw significant change in the lives of working women. World War I had temporarily allowed women to enter into industries such as chemical, automobile, and iron and steel manufacturing, which were once deemed inappropriate work for women. Black women, who had been historically closed out of factory jobs, began to find a place in industry during World War I by accepting lower wages and replacing the lost immigrant labor and in heavy work. Yet, like other women during World War I, their success was only temporary; most black women were also pushed out of their factory jobs after the war. In 1920, seventy-five percent of the black female labor force consisted of agricultural laborers, domestic servants, and laundry workers. The booming economy of the 1920s meant more opportunities even for the lower classes. Many young girls from working-class backgrounds did not need to help support their families as prior generations did and were often encouraged to seek work or receive vocational training which would result in social mobility.

Young women, especially, began staking claim to their own bodies and took part in a sexual liberation of their generation. Many of the ideas that fueled this change in sexual thought were already floating around New York intellectual circles prior to World War I, with the writings of Sigmund Freud, Havelock Ellis, and Ellen Key. There, thinkers outed that sex was not only central to the human experience but that women were sexual beings with human impulses and desires just like men and restraining these impulses was self-destructive. By the 1920s, these ideas had permeated the mainstream.

The 1920s saw the emergence of the co-ed, as women began attending large state colleges and universities. Women entered into the mainstream middle-class experience, but took on a gendered role within society. Women typically took classes such as home economics, "Husband and Wife", "Motherhood" and "The Family as an Economic Unit". In an increasingly conservative post-war era, it was common for a young woman to attend college with the intention of finding a suitable husband. Fueled by ideas of sexual liberation, dating underwent major changes on college campuses. With the advent of the automobile, courtship occurred in a much more private setting. "Petting", sexual relations without intercourse, became the social norm for college students.

Despite women's increased knowledge of pleasure and sex, the decade of unfettered capitalism that was the 1920s gave birth to the 'feminine mystique'. With this formulation, all women wanted to marry, all good women stayed at home with their children, cooking and cleaning, and the best women did the aforementioned and in addition, exercised their purchasing power freely and as frequently as possible in order to better their families and their homes.

==== Flappers ====
The "new woman" was in fashion throughout the twenties; this meant a woman who rejected the pieties (and often the politics) of the older generation, smoked and drank in public, had casual sex, and embraced consumer culture. Also called "flappers", these women wore short skirts (at first just to the ankles, eventually up to the knees) and bobbed hair in a short cut – like a boy's, but longer. Just as the flapper rejected the long hair popular in earlier years, she also discarded Victorian fashions, especially the corset, which accentuated women's curves. Flappers preferred to be slender, although it sometimes meant dieting or binding their breasts and wearing restrictive undergarments to appear thin, flat-chested, and long-limbed. Cultivating a flapper image and adhering to modern beauty standards also involved purchasing and applying cosmetics, which had not often been done previously by women other than prostitutes. These women further pushed the boundaries of what was considered proper for a woman by their public activities; swearing, smoking cigarettes, drinking alcohol (illegal from 1920 until 1933), dancing, and dating.

==== Firsts ====
Women achieved many groundbreaking firsts in the 1920s and 1930s. In 1921, Edith Wharton became the first woman to win the Pulitzer Prize for Fiction, for her novel "The Age of Innocence". In 1925, Nellie Tayloe Ross became the first woman elected as a governor in the United States, for the state of Wyoming. Also in 1925, the World Exposition of Women's Progress (the first women's world's fair) opened in Chicago. In 1926, Gertrude Ederle, born in New York, became the first woman to swim across the English channel, arriving in almost two hours less time than any of the men who had swum across before her. In 1928, women competed for the first time in Olympic field events. By 1928, women earned 39% of all college degrees in America, up from 19% at the turn of the 20th century.

==== Italian American resistance ====
The American scene in the 1920s featured a widespread expansion of women's roles, starting with the vote in 1920, and including new standards of education, employment and control of their own sexuality. "Flappers" raised the hemline and lowered the old restrictions in women's fashion. The Italian-American media disapproved. It demanded the holding of the line regarding traditional gender roles in which men controlled their families. Many traditional patriarchal values prevailed among Southern European male immigrants, although some practices like dowry were left behind in Europe. The community spokesman Were shocked that the image of a woman with a secret ballot. They ridiculed flappers and proclaimed that feminism was immoral. They idealizes an old male model of Italian womanhood. Mussolini was popular, and when he expanded the electorate to include some women voting at the local level, the Italian American editorialists went along, arguing that the true Italian woman was, above all, a mother and a wife and, therefore, would be reliable as a voter on local matters. Feminist organizations in Italy were ignored, as the editors purposely associated emancipation with Americanism and transformed the debate over women's rights into a defense of the Italian-American community to set its own boundaries and rules.

=== Great Depression of 1930s ===
In 1932, Hattie Caraway of Arkansas became the first woman elected to the Senate. Furthermore, in 1932 Amelia Earhart became the first woman to fly solo across the Atlantic, taking her journey on the 5th anniversary of Lindbergh's solo Atlantic flight . She was awarded the National Geographic Society's gold medal from President Herbert Hoover, and Congress awarded her the Distinguished Flying Cross. Later in 1932 she became the first woman to fly solo nonstop coast to coast, and set the women's nonstop transcontinental speed record, flying 2,447.8 miles in 19 hours 5 minutes. In 1935, she became the first person to solo the 2,408-mile distance across the Pacific between Honolulu and Oakland, California; this was also the first flight where a civilian aircraft carried a two-way radio. Later in 1935, she became the first person to fly solo from Los Angeles to Mexico City. Still later in 1935, she became the first person to fly solo nonstop from Mexico City to Newark. In 1937, Amelia Earhart began a flight around the world but vanished during it; her remains, effects, and plane have never been found. The first woman to fly solo around the world and return home safely was the American amateur pilot Jerrie Mock, who did so in 1964. In 1933, Frances Perkins was appointed by President Franklin Roosevelt as his Secretary of Labor, making her the first woman to hold a job in a Presidential cabinet.

However, women also faced many challenges during this time. A National Education Association survey showed that between 1930 and 1931, 63% of cities dismissed female teachers as soon as they became married, and 77% did not hire married women as teachers. Also, a survey of 1,500 cities from 1930 to 1931 found that three-quarters of those cities did not employ married women for any jobs. In January 1932, Congress passed the Federal Economy Act which stipulated that no two persons in the family could be working in government service at the same time; three-fourths of employees discharged as a result of this Act were women. However, during the Great Depression white women's unemployment rate was actually lower than that for men, because women were paid less and because men would not take what they considered to be "women's jobs" such as clerical work or domestic service. Yet as a result of rising unemployment, white women's movement into professional and technical work slowed.

Birth control activism was an important cause in the 1930s. In 1936, Margaret Sanger helped bring the case of "United States v. One Package" to the U.S. Circuit Court of Appeals. The decision in that case allowed physicians to legally mail birth control devices and information; however, it applied only to New York, Connecticut, and Vermont; birth control did not become legal for married couples throughout the United States until the 1965 Supreme Court decision Griswold v. Connecticut, and did not become legal for unmarried couples throughout the United States until the 1972 Supreme Court decision Eisenstadt v. Baird. In 1937, The American Medical Association officially recognized birth control as an integral part of medical practice and education, and North Carolina became the first state to recognize birth control as a public health measure and to provide contraceptive services to indigent mothers through its public health program.

In 1939, black singer Marian Anderson sang on the steps of the Lincoln Memorial, which was considered a milestone in the civil rights movement. She had originally wanted to sing at Washington D.C.'s largest venue, Constitution Hall, but The Daughters of the American Revolution barred her from performing there because of her race. Due to this, Eleanor Roosevelt, who was then the First Lady, resigned from the organization. This stands as one of the first actions taken by someone in the White House to address the era's racial inequality. Anderson performed at the White House three years prior in 1936, making her the first African-American performer to do so.

=== New Deal ===
Women received symbolic recognition under the New Deal (1933–43) but there was no effort to deal with their special needs. In relief programs, they were eligible for jobs only if they were the breadwinner in the family. Nevertheless, relief agencies did find jobs for women. The WPA employed about 500,000. The largest number, 295,000, worked on sewing projects, producing 300 million items of clothing and mattresses for people on relief and for public institutions such as orphanages. Many other women worked in school lunch programs.

Roosevelt appointed more women to office than any previous president, headed by the first woman to the cabinet, Secretary of Labor Frances Perkins. His wife Eleanor played a highly visible role in support of relief programs. In 1941, Eleanor became co-head of the Office of Civil Defense, the major civil defense agency. She tried to involve women at the local level, but she feuded with her counterpart Mayor Fiorello H. La Guardia, and had little impact on policy. Historian Alan Brinkley states:

Nor did the New Deal make much more than a symbolic effort to address problems of gender equality....New Deal programs (even those designed by New Deal women) continued most mostly to reflect traditional assumptions about women's roles and made few gestures toward the aspirations of women who sought economic independence and professional opportunities. The interest in individual and group rights that became so central to the postwar liberalism... was faint, and at times almost invisible, within the New Deal itself.

== Since 1941 ==
=== World War II ===
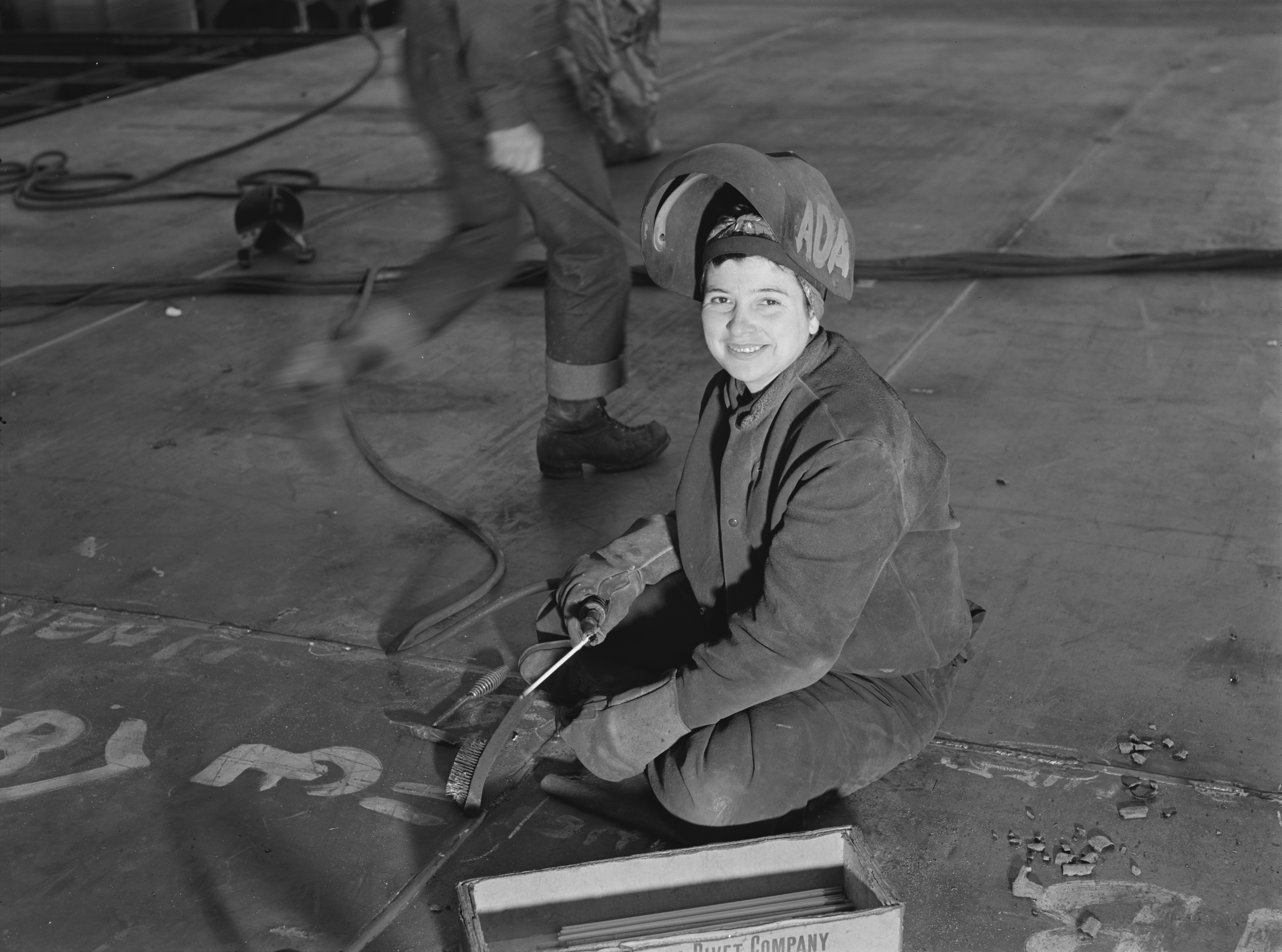
A female welder at the Richmond Shipyards, Richmond, California, in 1943. Women factory workers embodied the "Rosie the Riveter" model.

When the United States entered World War II in 1941, 12 million women were already working (making up one quarter of the workforce), and by the end of the war, the number was up to 18 million (one third of the workforce). Eventually 3 million women worked in war plants, but the majority of women who worked during World War II worked in traditionally female occupations, like the service sector. During this time, Government propaganda calling on women to enter the workforce during the emergency popularized the "Rosie the Riveter" image of women assuming male roles.

Standlee (2010) argues that during the war the traditional gender division of labor changed somewhat, as the "home" or domestic female sphere expanded to include the "home front". Meanwhile, the public sphere—the male domain—was redefined as the international stage of military action.

==== Employment ====
Wartime mobilization drastically changed the sexual divisions of labor for women, as young-able bodied men were sent overseas and war time manufacturing production increased. Throughout the war, according to Susan Hartmann (1982), an estimated 6.5 million women entered the labor force. Women, many of whom were married, took a variety of paid jobs in a multitude of vocational jobs, many of which were previously exclusive to men. The greatest wartime gain in female employment was in the manufacturing industry, where more than 2.5 million additional women represented an increase of 140 percent by 1944. This was catalyzed by the "Rosie the Riveter" phenomenon.

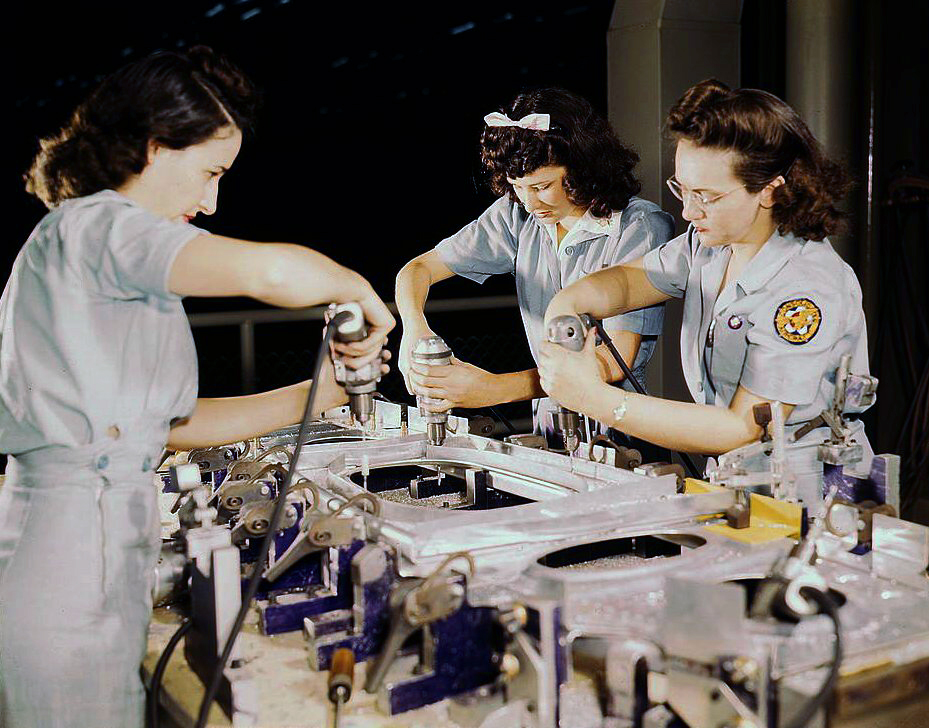
Assembling a wing section, Fort Worth, Texas, October 1942

The composition of the marital status of women who went to work changed considerably over the course of the war. One in every ten married women entered the labor force during the war, and they represented more than three million of the new female workers, while 2.89 million were single and the rest widowed or divorced. For the first time in the nation's history there were more married women than single women in the female labor force. In 1944, thirty-seven percent of all adult women were reported in the labor force, but nearly fifty percent of all women were actually employed at some time during that year at the height of wartime production. In the same year the unemployment rate hit an all-time historical low of 1.2%.

According to Hartmann (1982), the women who sought employment, based on various surveys and public opinion reports at the time suggests that financial reasoning was the justification for entering the labor force; however, patriotic motives made up another large portion of women's desires to enter. Women whose husbands were at war were more than twice as likely to seek jobs.

Fundamentally, women were thought to be taking work defined as "men's work;" however, the work women did was typically catered to specific skill sets management thought women could handle. Management would also advertise women's work as an extension of domesticity. For example, in a Sperry Corporation recruitment pamphlet the company stated, "Note the similarity between squeezing orange juice and the operation of a small drill press." A Ford Motor Company at Willow Run bomber plant publication proclaimed, "The ladies have shown they can operate drill presses as well as egg beaters." One manager was even stated saying, "Why should men, who from childhood on never so much as sewed on buttons be expected to handle delicate instruments better than women who have plied embroidery needles, knitting needles and darning needs all their lives?" In these instances, women were thought of and hired to do jobs management thought they could perform based on sex-typing.

Following the war, many women left their jobs voluntarily. One Twin Cities Army Ammunition Plant (formally Twin Cities Ordnance Plant) worker in New Brighton, Minnesota confessed, "I will gladly get back into the apron. I did not go into war work with the idea of working all my life. It was just to help out during the war." Other women were laid off by employers to make way for returning veterans who did not lose their seniority due to the war.

By the end of the war, many men who entered into the service did not return. This left women to take up sole responsibility of the household and provide economically for the family.

==== Black women in 1940s ====
Before the war most black women had been farm laborers in the South or domestics in Southern towns or Northern cities. Working with the federal Fair Employment Practices Committee, the NAACP, and CIO unions, these black women fought a "Double V campaign" —fighting against the Axis abroad and against restrictive hiring practices at home. Their efforts redefined citizenship, equating their patriotism with war work, and seeking equal employment opportunities, government entitlements, and better working conditions as conditions appropriate for full citizens. In the South, black women worked in segregated jobs; in the West and most of the North, they were integrated. However, wildcat strikes erupted in Detroit, Baltimore, and Evansville, Indiana where white migrants from the South refused to work alongside black women.

=== Nursing ===
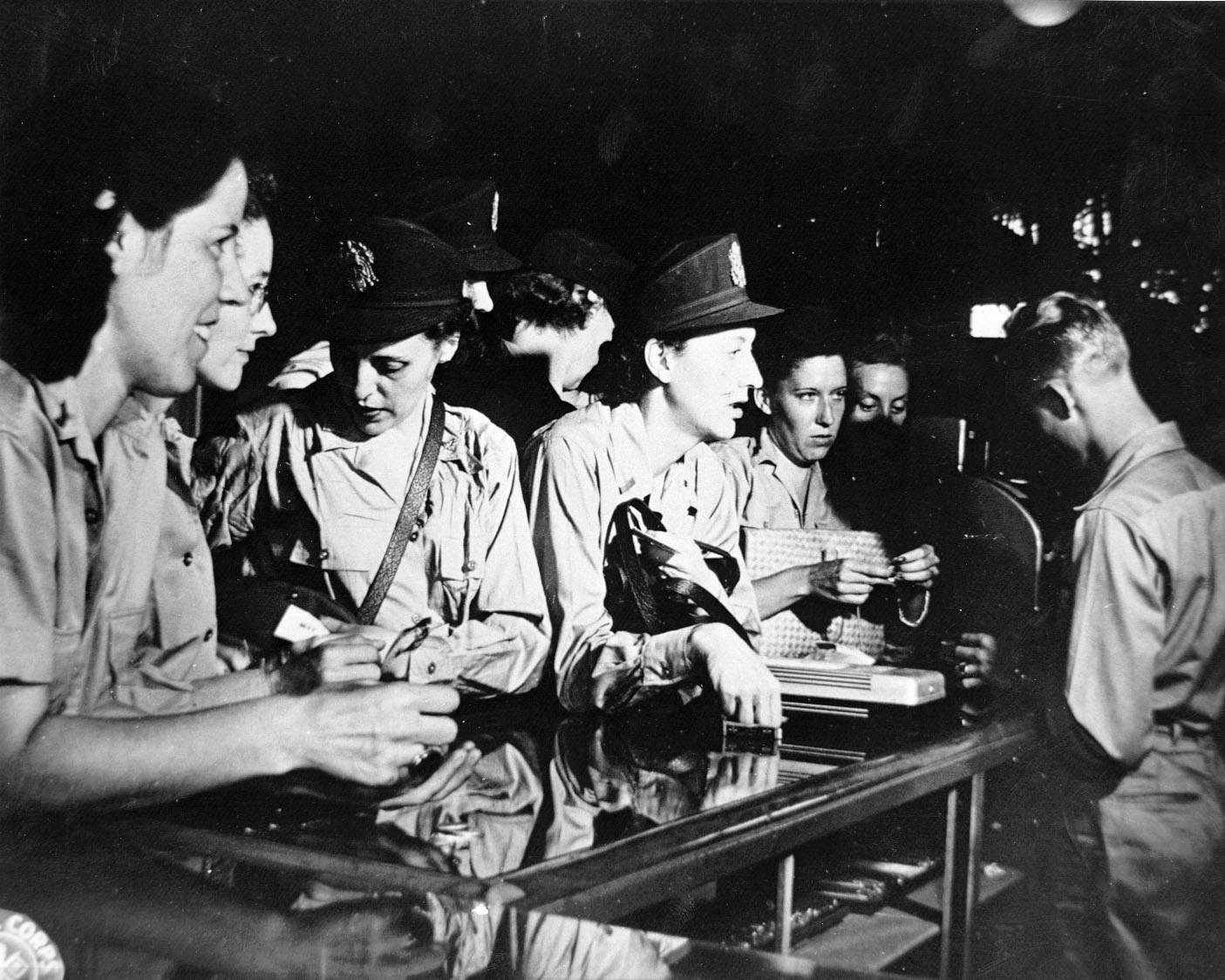
Women serving in the Army Nurse Corps during World War II

Nursing became a highly prestigious occupation for young women. A majority of female civilian nurses volunteered for the Army Nurse Corps or the Navy Nurse Corps. These women automatically became officers. Teenaged girls enlisted in the Cadet Nurse Corps. To cope with the growing shortage on the homefront, thousands of retired nurses volunteered to help out in local hospitals.

=== Volunteer activities ===
Women staffed millions of jobs in community service roles, such as nursing, the USO, and the Red Cross. Unorganized women were encouraged to collect and turn in materials that were needed by the war effort. Women collected fats rendered during cooking, children formed balls of aluminum foil they peeled from chewing gum wrappers and also created rubber band balls, which they contributed to the war effort. Hundreds of thousands of men joined civil defense units to prepare for disasters, such as enemy bombing.

The Women Airforce Service Pilots (WASP) mobilized 1,000 civilian women to fly new warplanes from the factories to airfields located on the east coast of the U.S. This was historically significant because flying a warplane had always been a male role. No American women flew warplanes in combat.

=== Baby boom ===
Marriage and motherhood came back as prosperity empowered couples who had postponed marriage. The birth rate started shooting up in 1941, paused in 1944–45 as 12 million men were in uniform, then continued to soar until reaching a peak in the late 1950s. This was the "Baby Boom."

In a New Deal-like move, the federal government set up the "EMIC" program that provided free prenatal and natal care for the wives of servicemen below the rank of sergeant.

Housing shortages, especially in the munitions centers, forced millions of couples to live with parents or in makeshift facilities. Little housing had been built in the Depression years, so the shortages grew steadily worse until about 1949, when a massive housing boom finally caught up with demand. (After 1944, much of the new housing was supported by the G.I. Bill.)

Federal law made it difficult to divorce absent servicemen, so the number of divorces peaked when they returned in 1946. In long-range terms, divorce rates changed little.

=== Housewives ===
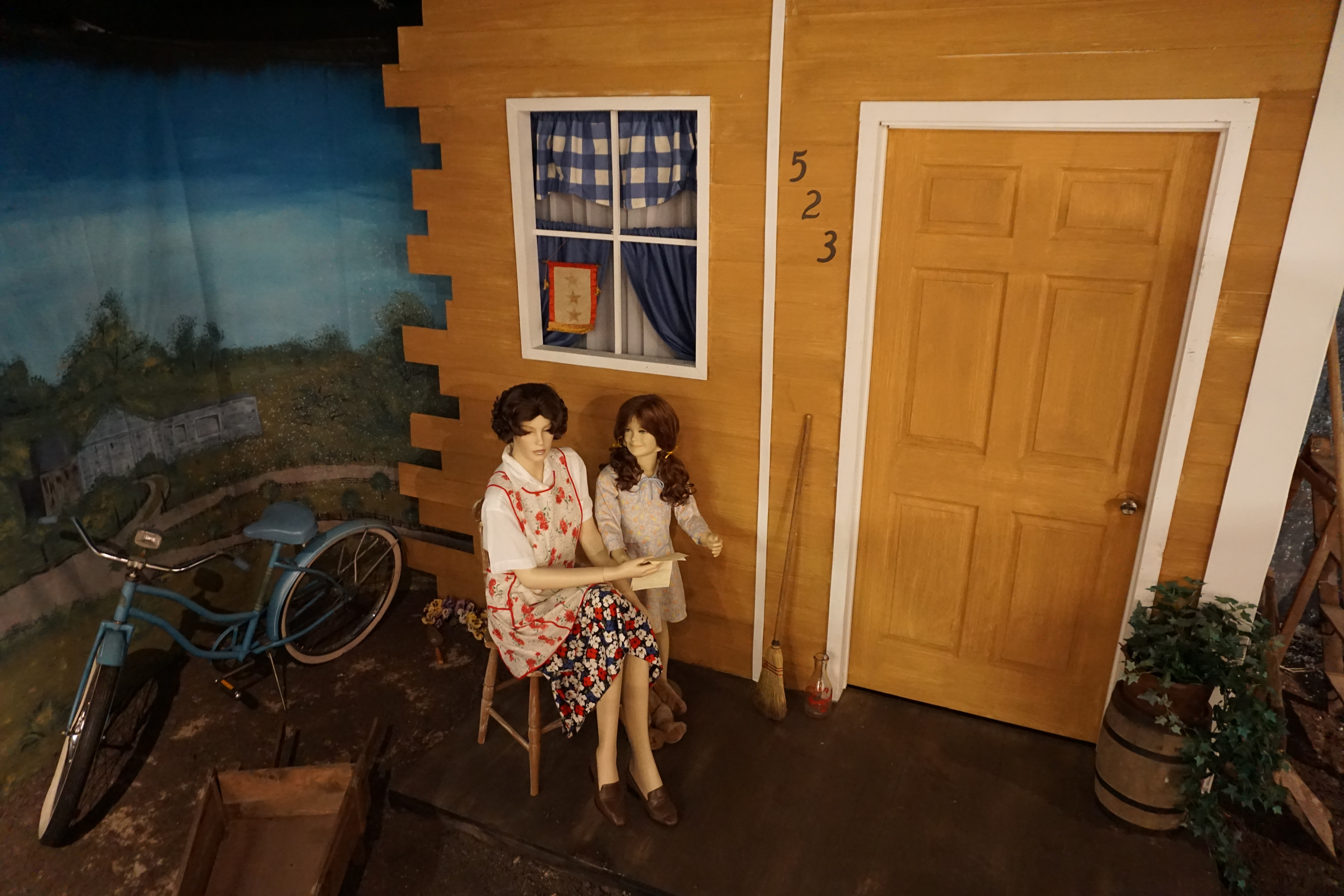
A World War II American home front diorama, depicting a woman and her daughter, at the Audie Murphy American Cotton Museum

Juggling their roles as mothers due to the Baby Boom and the jobs they filled while the men were at war, women strained to complete all tasks set before them. The war caused cutbacks in automobile and bus service, and migration from farms and towns to munitions centers. Those housewives who worked found the dual role difficult to handle.

Stress came when sons, husbands, fathers, brothers, and fiancés were drafted and sent to faraway training camps, preparing for a war in which nobody knew how many would be killed. Millions of wives tried to relocate near their husbands' training camps.

At the end of the war, most of the munitions-making jobs ended. Many factories were closed; others retooled for civilian production. In some jobs women were replaced by returning veterans who did not lose seniority because they were in service. However the number of women at work in 1946 was 87% of the number in 1944, leaving 13% who lost or quit their jobs. Many women working in machinery factories and more were taken out of the work force. Many of these former factory workers found other work at kitchens, being teachers, etc.

=== Military service ===
Furthermore, during World War II 350,000 women served in the military, as WACS, WAVES, SPARS, Marines and nurses. More than 60,000 Army nurses served stateside and overseas during World War II; 67 Army nurses were captured by the Japanese in the Philippines in 1942 and were held as POWs for over two and a half years. More than 14,000 Navy nurses served stateside, overseas on hospital ships, and as flight nurses during the war. Five Navy nurses were captured by the Japanese on the island of Guam and held as POWs for five months before being exchanged; a second group of eleven Navy nurses were captured by the Japanese in the Philippines and held for 37 months.

Over 150,000 American women served in the Women's Army Corps (WAC) during World War II; the Corps was formed in 1942. Many Army WACs computed the velocity of bullets, measured bomb fragments, mixed gunpowder, and loaded shells. Others worked as draftswomen, mechanics, and electricians, and some received training in ordnance engineering. Later in the war, women were trained to replace men as radio operators on U.S. Army hospital ships. The "Larkspur", the "Charles A. Stafford", and the "Blanche F. Sigman" each received three enlisted women and one officer near the end of 1944. This experiment proved successful, and the assignment of female secretaries and clerical workers to hospital ships occurred soon after.

Eventually the Air Force obtained 40% of all WACs in the Army; women were assigned as weather observers and forecasters, cryptographers, radio operators and repairmen, sheet metal workers, parachute riggers, link trainer instructors, bombsight maintenance specialists, aerial photograph analysts, and control tower operators. Over 1,000 WACs ran the statistical control tabulating machines (the precursors of modern-day computers) used to keep track of personnel records. By January 1945 only 50% of AAF WACs held traditional assignments such as file clerk, typist, and stenographer. A few Air Force WACs were assigned flying duties; two WAC radio operators assigned to Mitchel Field, New York, flew as crew members on B-17 training flights. WAC mechanics and photographers also made regular flights. Three WACs were awarded Air Medals, including one in India for her work in mapping "the Hump," the mountainous air route overflown by pilots ferrying lend-lease supplies to the Chinese Army. One woman died in the crash of an aerial broadcasting plane.

In 1942, the WAVES (Women Accepted for Volunteer Emergency Service) division was founded as an all-female division of the Navy, and more than 80,000 women served in it, including computer scientist Grace Hopper, who later achieved the rank of rear admiral. While traditionally female secretarial and clerical jobs took a large portion of the WAVES women, thousands of WAVES performed previously atypical duties in the aviation community, Judge Advocate General Corps, medical professions, communications, intelligence, science and technology. The WAVES ended and women were accepted into the regular Navy in 1948. The first six enlisted women to be sworn into the regular Navy on July 7, 1948 were Kay Langdon, Wilma Marchal, Edna Young, Frances Devaney, Doris Robertson. and Ruth Flora. On October 15, 1948, the first eight women to be commissioned in the regular Navy, Joy Bright Hancock, Winifred Quick Collins, Ann King, Frances Willoughby, Ellen Ford, Doris Cranmore, Doris Defenderfer, and Betty Rae Tennant took their oaths as naval officers.

Semper Paratus Always Ready, better known as SPARS, was the United States Coast Guard Women's Reserve, created November 23, 1942; more than 11,000 women served in SPARS during World War II. SPARs were assigned stateside and served as storekeepers, clerks, photographers, pharmacist's mates, cooks, and in numerous other jobs. The program was largely demobilized after the war.

The Marine Corps created a Women's Reserve in 1943; women served as Marines during the war in over 225 different specialties, filling 85% of the enlisted jobs at Headquarters Marine Corps and comprising one-half to two-thirds of the permanent personnel at major Marine Corps posts. Marine women served stateside as clerks, cooks, mechanics, drivers, and in a variety of other positions.

The Women's Airforce Service Pilots (also known as WASP) was a civilian agency that had uniforms but no military status. It was created in 1943 to free male pilots for combat service. WASPs flew stateside missions as ferriers, test pilots, and anti-aircraft artillery trainers. Some 25,000 women applied to join the WASP, but only 1,830 were accepted and took the oath, and out of those only 1,074 women passed the training and joined. The WASPs flew over 60 million miles in all, in every type of aircraft in the AAF arsenal.

WASPs were granted veteran status in 1977, and given the Congressional Gold Medal in 2009.

Some women were spies for America during World War II, for example the singer Josephine Baker, whose long residency in France helped her form an underground network, and Claire Phillips, a spy in the Philippines (then occupied by Japan) who in addition to spying sent aid and supplies to the American POWs; Claire was tortured, but never admitted to knowing the people in her spy ring, and after the war she was recognized by the American and Philippine governments for her heroism.

=== Postwar ===
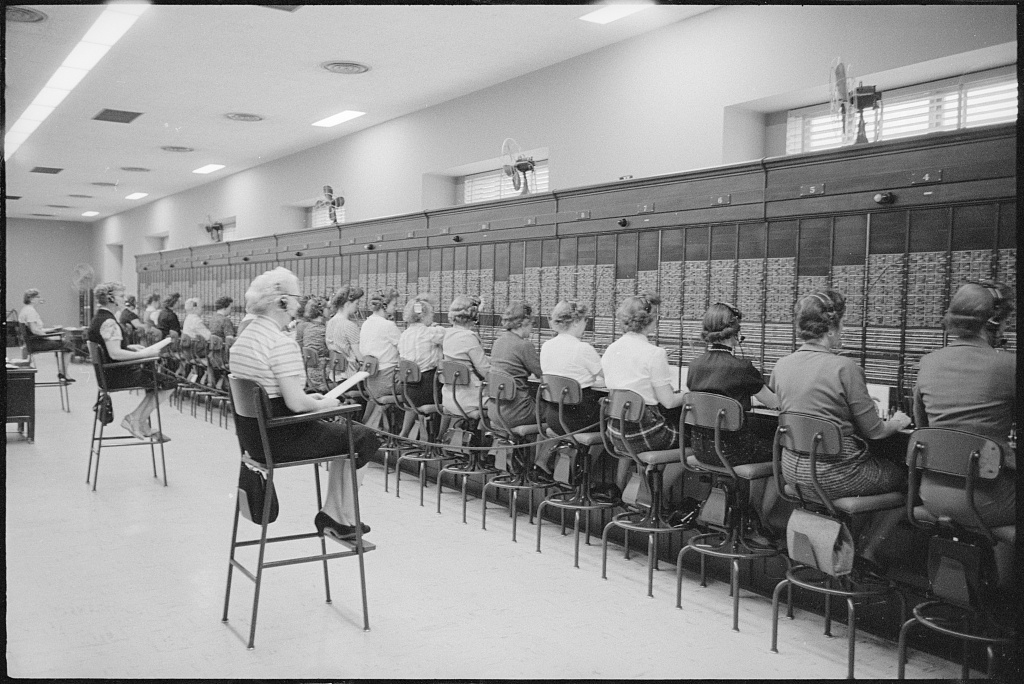
Women working at a switchboard at the U.S. Capitol, Washington, D.C., 1959

Once World War II ended in 1945, female munitions workers were expected to give up their jobs to returning male veterans and go back home to have, and care for children put off by the war. In 1946, 4,000,000 women were fired from their jobs. But for many women, work was an economic necessity, and they simply went back to the sort of low-paying jobs they had held before the war. However, most people in the 1950s felt that ideally women should be homemakers and men should be breadwinners. A booming economy helped to make this possible; by the mid-1950s, 40% of Americans were living in the suburbs with, on average, 3.8 children, two cars and two television sets. This lifestyle affected the aspirations of housewives and mothers: only 38% of women went to college in 1958 compared to 47% in 1920, despite the availability of more federal aid to pay for university education in the post-war America. Furthermore, although 46% of women worked during the 1950s, 75% of them worked in simple clerical or sales jobs. The average working woman in the 1950s earned 60% of the average working man's salary.

However, there were still advances for women in the military. The Army-Navy Nurse Act of 1947 made the Army Nurse Corps and Women's Medical Specialist Corps part of the regular Army and gave permanent commissioned officer status to Army and Navy nurses. In 1948, Congress passed the Women's Armed Forces Integration Act, which authorized women to enlist in the military alongside men, rather than in their own separate units, although women were still not allowed to serve in combat. Furthermore, in 1948 Executive Order 9981 ended racial segregation in the armed services. In 1949, the Air Force Nurse Corps was established (the Air Force itself was created in 1947). That same year, the first African-American women enlisted in the Marine Corps.

The Korean War was fought from 1950 to 1953. Many servicewomen who had joined the Reserves following World War II were involuntarily recalled to active duty during the Korean War. 540 Army nurses (all military nurses during the Korean War were female) served in the combat zone and many more were assigned to large hospitals in Japan during the war. One Army nurse (Genevieve Smith) died in a plane crash en route to Korea on July 27, 1950, shortly after hostilities began. Navy nurses served on hospital ships in the Korean theater of war as well as at Navy hospitals stateside. Eleven Navy nurses died en route to Korea when their plane crashed in the Marshall Islands. Air Force nurses served stateside, in Japan and as flight nurses in the Korean theater during the war. Three Air Force nurses were killed in plane crashes while on duty. Many other servicewomen were assigned to duty in the theater of operations in Japan and Okinawa.

=== Civil rights ===
Women were heavily involved in lesbian rights and civil rights throughout the 1950s. The 1954 case Oliver Brown et al. v. The Board of Education of Topeka, Kansas was named after Oliver Brown as a legal strategy to have a man at the head of the roster, although the 13 plaintiffs included 12 women and only one man: Oliver Brown, Darlene Brown, Lena Carper, Sadie Emmanuel, Marguerite Emerson, Shirley Fleming, Zelma Henderson, Shirley Hodison, Maude Lawton, Alma Lewis, Iona Richardson, and Lucinda Todd. In 1955, the first national lesbian political and social organization in the United States, called Daughters of Bilitis, was founded by four lesbian couples in San Francisco (including Del Martin and Phyllis Lyon). On December 1, 1955, Rosa Parks, a seamstress and volunteer secretary for the NAACP, was arrested in Montgomery, Alabama for refusing to give up her seat on a bus to a white man, as required by law at the time; shortly after this a bus boycott began, inspired by her actions, advocating for an end to all segregated busing. The night of Rosa Parks' arrest, with her permission, Mrs. Jo Ann Robinson stayed up mimeographing 35,000 handbills calling for a boycott of the Montgomery bus system. Prior to Rosa Parks' action, Claudette Colvin and Mary Louise Smith had refused to give up their seats on buses to white women, but their cases were eventually rejected by civil rights lawyers as they were not considered sympathetic enough. Aurelia Shines Browder refused to give up her seat to a white man in Montgomery, Alabama in April 1955, and she filed suit against the city and its Democrat Mayor W.A. "Tacky" Gayle. It was on her case, known as Browder v Gayle, that the Supreme Court ruled in 1956 that segregated busing was unconstitutional, thus ending the bus boycott. Aurelia Browder was the lead plaintiff in the case, and Susie McDonald, Claudette Colvin, and Mary Louise Smith were the other plaintiffs. In the 1960s, legal scholar Pauli Murray coined the term "Jane Crow" to highlight racial inequality experienced by women of color.

=== Hispanic women since 1950 ===
In a 1998 study of Mexican Americans it was found that males were more likely to endorse the notion than men should be the sole breadwinners of the family, while Mexican American women did not endorse this notion.

Prior to the 1960s countercultural movement, Mexican men often felt an exaggerated need to be the sole breadwinner of their families. There are two sides to machismo, the man who has a strong work ethic and lives up to his responsibilities, or the man who heavily drinks and therefore displays acts of unpleasant behavior towards his family.

The traditional roles of women in a Hispanic community are of housewife and mother, a woman's role is to cook, clean, and care for her children and husband; putting herself and her needs last. The typical structure of a Hispanic family forces women to defer authority to her husband, allowing him to make the important decisions, that both the woman and children must abide by. In traditional Hispanic households, women and young girls are homebodies or muchachas de la casa ("girls of the house"), showing that they abide "by the cultural norms ... [of] respectability, chastity, and family honor [as] valued by the [Hispanic] community".

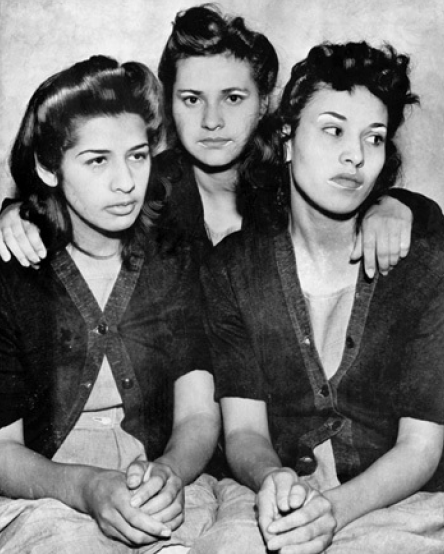
Pachucas were a counter-culture that subverted gender norms and influenced the rise of Chicana feminism.

Migration to the United States can change the identity of Hispanic youth in various ways, including how they carry their gendered identities. However, when Hispanic women come to the United States, they tend to adapt to the perceived social norms of this new country and their social location changes as they become more independent and able to live without the financial support of their families or partners. The unassimilated community views these adapting women as being de la calle ("of [or from] the street"), transgressive, and sexually promiscuous. A women's motive for pursuing an education or career is to prove she can care and make someone of herself, breaking the traditional gender role that a Hispanic woman can only serve as a mother or housewife, thus changing a woman's role in society. Some Hispanic families in the United States "deal with young women's failure to adhere to these culturally prescribed norms of proper gendered behavior in a variety of ways, including sending them to live in ... [the sending country] with family members, regardless of whether or not ... [the young women] are sexually active". Now there has been a rise in the Hispanic community where both men and women are known to work and split the household chores among themselves; women are encouraged to gain an education, degree, and pursue a career.

=== Status of women ===
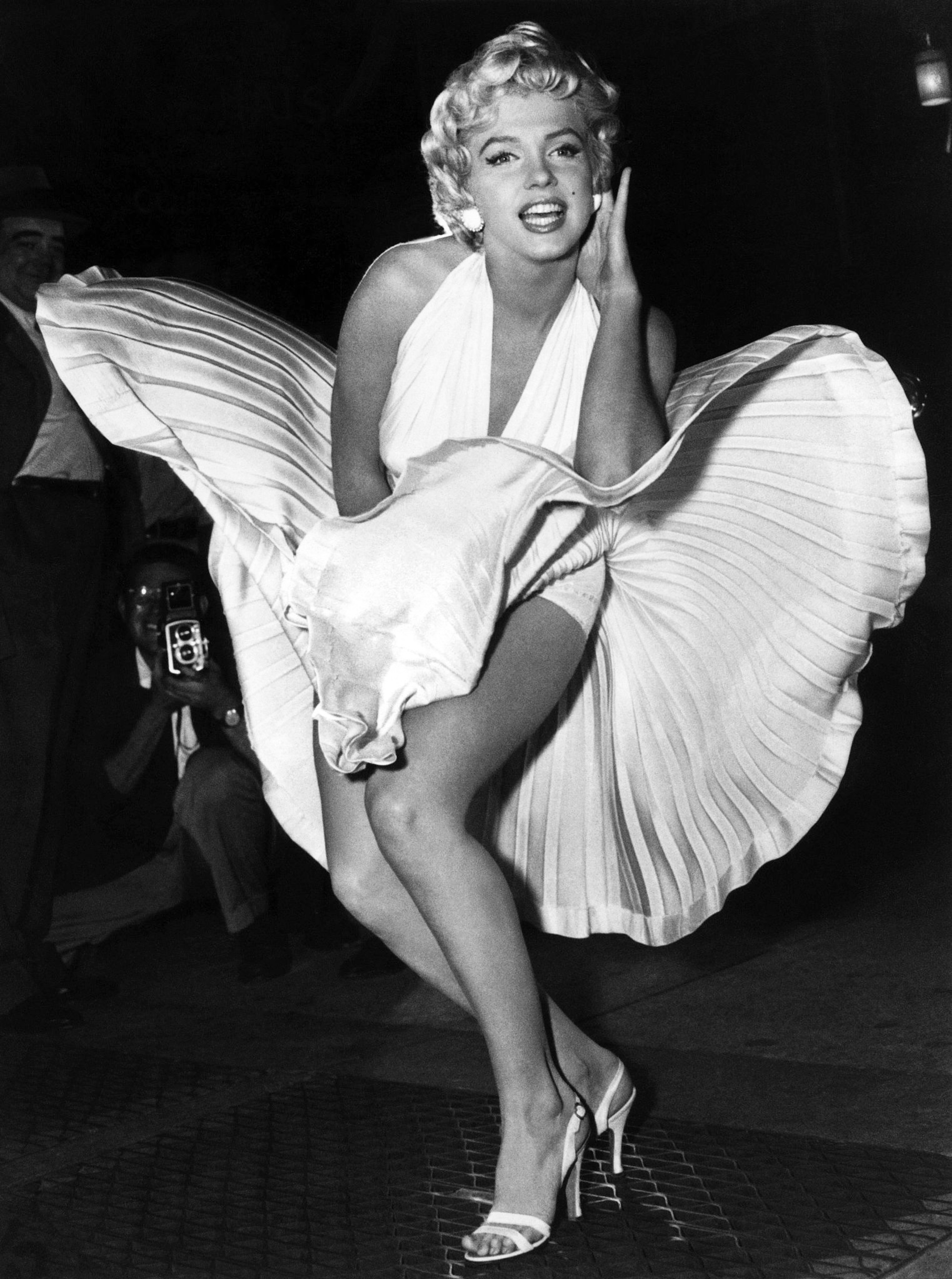
Marilyn Monroe posing for photographers in The Seven Year Itch, 1955

Yet women still occupied a lower position than men in many sectors of American life. In 1957, the National Manpower Council (NMC) at Columbia University published its study, "Womanpower, A Statement by the National Manpower Council with Chapters by the Council Staff". It was a comprehensive look at the experience of women in the labor force, their employment needs, and the implications of both for education, training, and public policy. This NMC analysis called women "essential" and "distinctive" workers and recommended that the Secretary of Labor establish a committee to review "the consequences and adequacy of existing Federal and state laws which have a direct bearing on the employment of women." But this suggestion was not acted upon by the Eisenhower Administration. In 1959, three landmark books on women were published: A Century of Struggle by Eleanor Flexner, the first professional history of the 19th century women's movement, which contained an implicit call to arms; A Century of Higher Education for American Women by Mabel Newcomer, which disclosed that the relative position of women in the academic world was in decline; and Women and Work in America by Robert Smuts, which drew attention to the fact that "the picture of women's occupations outside the home between 1890 and 1950 had changed in only a few essentials."

In reaction to such findings, by 1961, President John F. Kennedy was under pressure to establish a President's Commission on the Status of Women. Esther Peterson, Assistant Secretary of Labor and director of the Women's Bureau, and the highest ranking woman in the Kennedy Administration, wanted such a commission. Along with equal pay legislation, it had long been on the agenda of labor movement women and it was in that movement that Peterson's working career had been concentrated. Another wish of the women's movement, effective birth control, came true as in 1961 the first birth control pill, called Enovid, received FDA approval and went on the market. Women's organizations, notably the American Association of University Women and Business and Professional Women, had been proposing a women's rights commission for many years; they found a champion in Eleanor Roosevelt, who backed the proposal when she met with Kennedy at the White House after his election. The establishment of the Commission may also have been regarded by Kennedy as an expedient way to pay off his political debts to the women who had supported his campaign but were disappointed with his poor record of appointments of women to his administration. There was also a desire to have Eleanor Roosevelt, one of the most respected women in the country, associated with the Kennedy Administration. Roosevelt had only reluctantly supported JFK's presidential candidacy after her first choice, Adlai Stevenson, lost the nomination. However, she agreed to be the Chairperson of the President's Commission on the Status of Women, which was held from 1961 until 1963.

The Commission's Report, called "The American Woman" and issued in 1963, noted discrimination against women in the areas of education, home and community services, employment, social insurance and taxation, and legal, civil and political rights. The report also recommended continued network-building. President Kennedy implemented two Commission recommendations that established an Interdepartmental Committee on the Status of Women and a Citizens' Advisory Council on the Status of Women, composed of twenty private citizens appointed by the President. These two groups co-sponsored four national conferences of state commissions on the status of women. Another important event of 1963 was the publication of Betty Friedan's influential book The Feminine Mystique, which is often cited as the founding moment of second-wave feminism. This book highlighted Friedan's view of a coercive and pervasive post-World War-II ideology of female domesticity that stifled middle-class women's opportunities to be anything but homemakers. Friedan's book is credited with sparking second-wave feminism by directing women's attention to the broad social basis of their problems, stirring many to political and social activism.

Also in 1963, President Kennedy signed the Equal Pay Act of 1963 into law, which amended the Fair Labor Standards Act to prohibit pay discrimination because of sex. It requires the employer to pay equal wages to men and women doing equal work on jobs requiring equal skill, effort, and responsibility, which are performed under similar working conditions. However, it did not originally cover executives, administrators, outside salespeople, or professionals. In 1972, Congress enacted the Education Amendments of 1972, which (among other things) amended the Fair Labor Standards Act to expand the coverage of the Equal Pay Act to these employees, by excluding the Equal Pay Act from the professional workers exemption of the Fair Labor Standards Act. Another accomplishment for feminism in 1963 was that feminist activist Gloria Steinem published her article I Was a Playboy Bunny, a behind the scenes look at the sexist treatment of Playboy bunnies, which was one of her first major assignments in investigative journalism.

There were several political firsts for women in the 1960s. On November 22, 1963, following the assassination of President Kennedy, federal judge Sarah T. Hughes administered the Presidential Oath of Office to Lyndon Johnson aboard Air Force One, the only time a woman has done so, as the Chief Justice of the Supreme Court normally has this honor. 1964 was the first year in which more women voted in a Presidential election than men; more women have voted than men in every Presidential election since.

One of the most important advances for women's rights in this decade was not begun by a feminist. On Saturday, February 8, 1964, while the Civil Rights Act was being debated on the House floor, Howard W. Smith of Virginia, Chairman of the Rules Committee and staunch opponent of all civil rights legislation, rose up and offered a one word amendment to Title VII, which prohibited employment discrimination. He proposed to add "sex" to that one title of the bill in order "to prevent discrimination against another minority group, the women,".... (110 Cong. Rec., February 8, 1964, 2577). This stimulated several hours of humorous debate, later called "ladies day in the House", before the amendment was passed by a teller vote of 168 to 133. The Congressional Record shows Smith made serious arguments, voicing concerns that white women would suffer greater discrimination without a protection for gender. Liberals—who knew Smith was hostile to civil rights for blacks—assumed that he was hostile to rights for women, unaware of his long connection with white feminists.

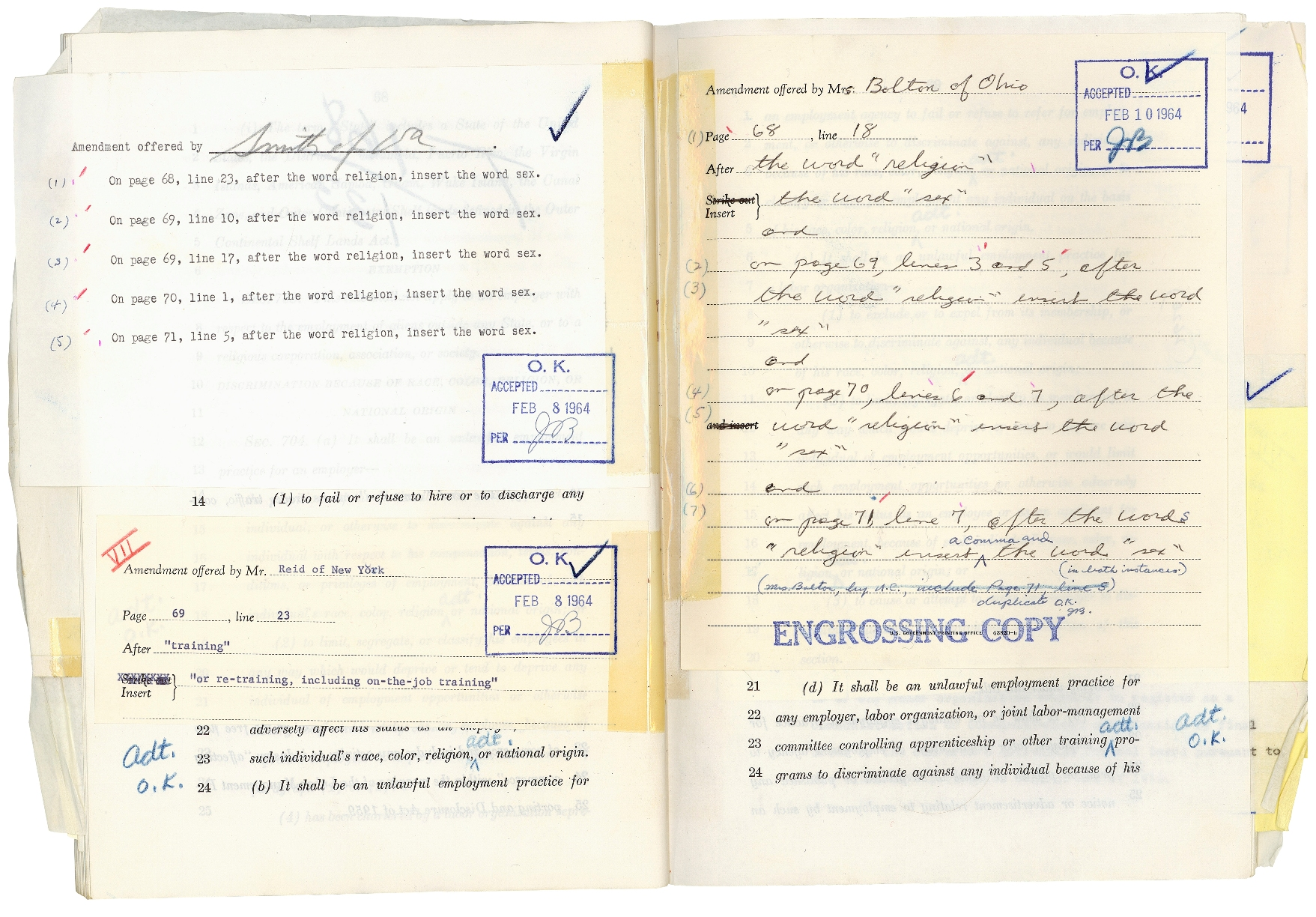
House Rules Committee clerk's record of markup session adding "sex" to bill.

The Equal Employment Opportunity Commission, in charge of the enforcement of Title VII, ignored sex discrimination complaints, and the prohibition against sex discrimination in employment went unenforced for the next few years. One EEOC director called the prohibition "a fluke...conceived out of wedlock," and even the liberal magazine The New Republic asked, "Why should a mischievous joke perpetrated on the floor of the House of Representatives be treated by a responsible administration body with this kind of seriousness?"

1965 saw the Supreme Court case Griswold v. Connecticut, 381 U.S. 479 (1965), a landmark case in which the Supreme Court of the United States ruled that the Constitution protected a right to privacy. The case involved Estelle Griswold acting against a Connecticut "Comstock law" that prohibited any person from using "any drug, medicinal article or instrument for the purpose of preventing conception." By a vote of 7–2, the Supreme Court invalidated the law on the grounds that it violated the "right to marital privacy", establishing the basis for the right to privacy with respect to intimate practices.

In 1966, at the third National Conference of State Commissions on the Status of Women, the conference organizers did not allow resolutions or actions of any kind meant to abolish discrimination against women, so some women who were attending decided to form an advocacy organization of their own. Cornering a large table at the conference luncheon, so that they could start organizing before they had to rush for planes, each of those women chipped in five dollars, Betty Friedan wrote the acronym NOW on a napkin, and the National Organization for Women was created. Its first meeting was held on June 28, 1966 in Betty Friedan's hotel room, with 28 women attending. At its first conference in October 1966, Friedan was elected NOW's first president, and her fame as the author of the bestselling book The Feminine Mystique helped attract thousands of women to the organization. Friedan drafted NOW's original Statement of Purpose, which began, "The purpose of NOW is to take action to bring women into full participation in the mainstream of American society now, exercising all the privileges and responsibilities thereof in truly equal partnership with men." Furthermore, in 1966, Congresswoman Martha Griffiths admonished the EEOC on the floor of Congress for their failure to enforce the prohibition against sex discrimination in employment.

Employment discrimination against women began to be taken more seriously in the late 1960s. In 1967, President Lyndon Johnson issued Executive Order 11375, which declared that federal employers must take affirmative action to ensure that employees receive equal treatment and opportunities regardless of gender, race, color, or religion. In 1968, the EEOC, following two years of protests by NOW, banned all help wanted ads which specified which sex a job applicant should be, except those jobs for which being a certain sex was a bona fide occupational requirement (such as actress), opening many hitherto unattainable jobs to women. The Supreme Court ruled the ban legal in Pittsburgh Press Co. v Pittsburgh Commission on Human Relations, 413 U.S. 376 (1973).

=== Late 1960s ===
There were several other feminist advances in the late 1960s, in both conservative and liberal circles. In 1968, conservative women separated from NOW and organized Women's Equity Action League (WEAL) to campaign for equal opportunities for women in education, economics, and employment, while avoiding issues such as abortion, sexuality, and the Equal Rights Amendment. Also in 1968, there was a protest of the Miss America pageant in Atlantic City; at the protest a group of about one hundred women tossed items that they considered symbolic of women's oppression into a Freedom Trash Can, including copies of Playboy, high-heeled shoes, corsets, and girdles. They also crowned a sheep as Miss America. Lindsy Van Gelder, a reporter for the Post, wrote a piece about the protest in which she compared the trash-can procession to the burning of draft cards at antiwar marches. However, the rumor that women burned their bras at the protest is not true.

=== 1970s ===
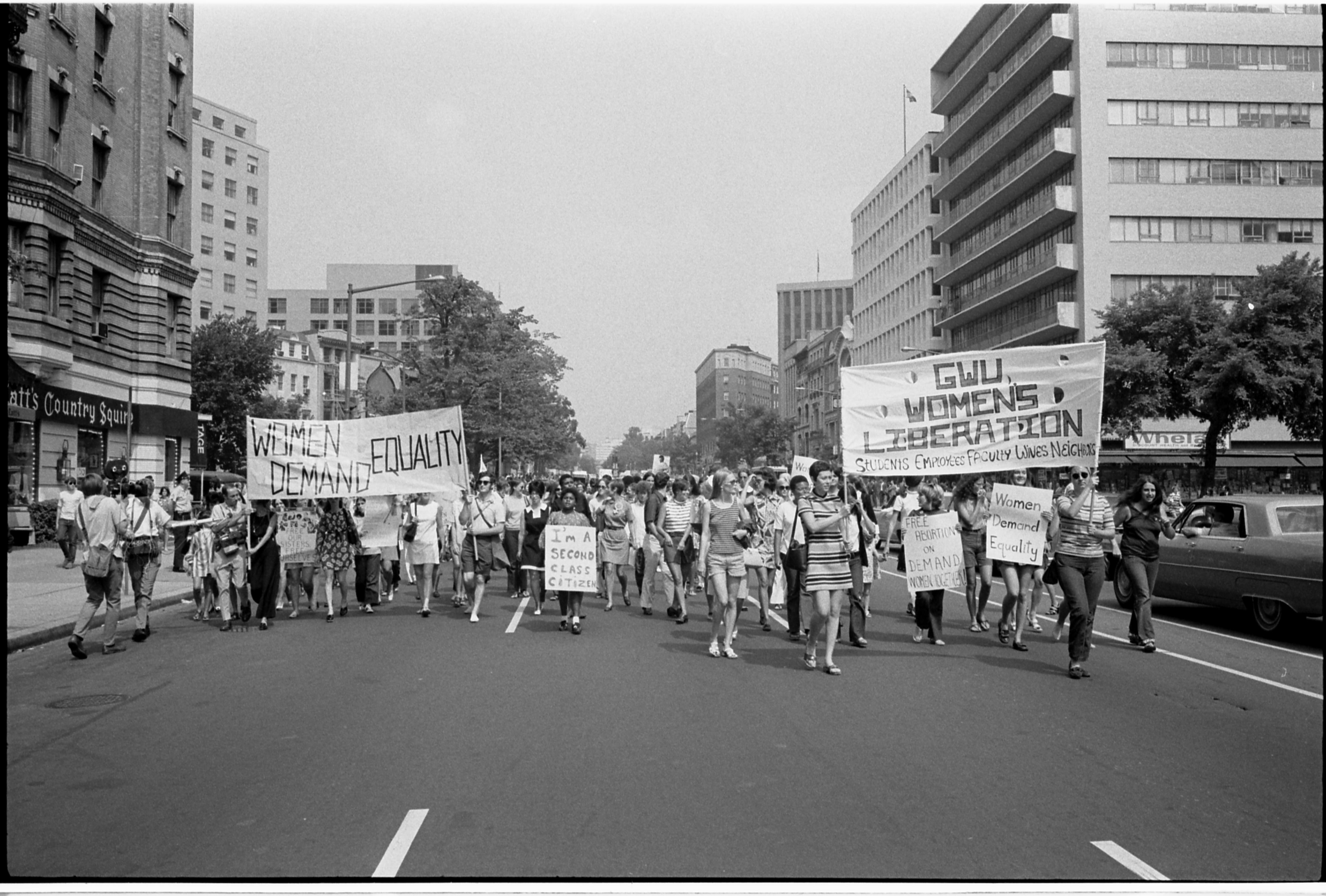
Women's march in Washington, D.C., 1970

Litigation for women's rights now began to have a serious impact on American life. In 1970, California adopted the nation's first no-fault divorce law, which was intended to promote equality between men and women. By 2010, all 50 states had legalized no-fault divorce, with New York being the last state to do so. In 1969, the case Weeks v Southern Bell was decided in favor of Lorena Weeks, who had applied for a better job as a switchperson, but had her application rejected because, her union boss said, "the man is the breadwinner in the family, and women just do not need this type of job." Weeks filed a complaint with the EEOC, but the phone company cited a Georgia law that prohibited women from lifting anything heavier than 30 pounds, although the 34-pound manual typewriter Weeks used as a clerk had to be lifted by hand onto her desk every morning and stored away every night. After the case was decided, she received $31,000 in back pay and got the job. In the 1971 Supreme Court case Reed v Reed, the Supreme Court ruled that it is illegal for any state to prefer all men over all women as administrators of assets. This was the first time in history that the Supreme Court ruled that the Equal Protection Clause of the Fourteenth Amendment to the United States Constitution applied to differential treatment based on legal sex.

In addition to litigation, feminist activists also began to form their own institutions to propagate their ideals. In 1971, feminists including Rep. Bella Abzug, Betty Friedan, and Gloria Steinem founded the National Women's Political Caucus to advocate for more women and feminists in elective office. Also in 1971, Gloria Steinem and others began publishing Ms., the first national American feminist magazine.

The first three hundred thousand copies of Ms. sold out in eight days; the magazine name comes from the fact that the title Ms. was originally popularized by feminists in the 1970s to replace Miss and Mrs. and provide a parallel term to Mr., in that both Ms. and Mr. designate gender without indicating marital status.

In 1972, former NOW members Pat Goltz and Cathy Callaghan founded Feminists for Life, with the goal of eliminating the root causes that they felt drove women to abortion, contending that abortion violated core feminist principles of justice, non-discrimination and nonviolence.

1972 also saw the Supreme Court case Eisenstadt v. Baird, 405 U.S. 438 (1972), that established the right of unmarried people to possess contraception on the same basis as married couples and, by implication, the right of unmarried couples to engage in potentially nonprocreative sexual intercourse (though not the right of unmarried people to engage in any type of sexual intercourse). The Court struck down a Massachusetts law prohibiting the distribution of contraceptives to unmarried people, ruling that it violated the Equal Protection Clause of the Constitution.

One of the most important feminist successes of the early 1970s was when Nixon signed into law the Equal Employment Opportunity Act of 1972 and Title IX of the Education Amendments of 1972. The Equal Employment Opportunity Act of 1972 gives the Equal Employment Opportunity Commission (EEOC) authority to sue in federal courts when it finds reasonable cause to believe that there has been employment discrimination based on race, color, religion, sex, or national origin. In the case of public employment, the EEOC refers the matter to the United States Attorney General to bring the lawsuit. Title IX of the Education Amendments of 1972 requires gender equity in every educational program that receives federal funding including but not limited to sports.

However, the feminist movement did have some notable setbacks around this time. In 1972, President Nixon vetoed the Comprehensive Child Development Bill of 1972, which many feminists advocated and which would have established both early-education programs and after-school care across the country, with tuition on a sliding scale based on a family's income bracket, and the program available to everyone but participation required of no one.

==== Defeat of the Equal Rights Amendment ====
Pro-ERA advocacy was led by the National Organization for Women (NOW) and ERAmerica, a coalition of nearly 80 other organizations. The Equal Rights Amendment passed the Senate and then the House of Representatives in 1972, and on March 22, 1972, it was sent to the states for ratification. However, it was not ratified before the deadline for ratification passed, and therefore never became law. Some states'-rights advocates thought the ERA was a federal power grab. Some feminists claimed that the insurance industry opposed a measure they believed would cost them money. Opposition to the ERA was also organized by fundamentalist religious groups.

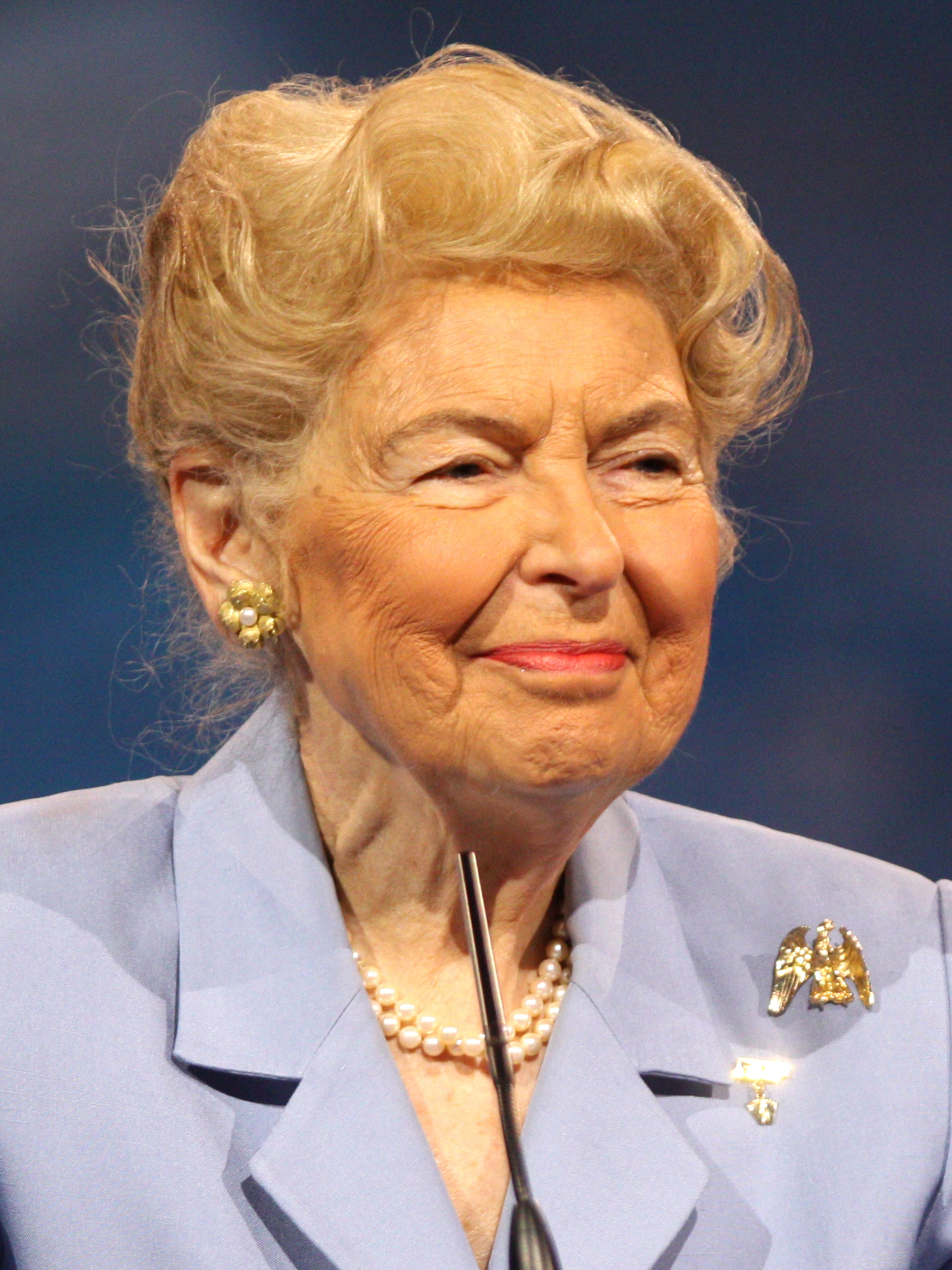
Phyllis Schlafly, a conservative activist, organized opposition to the ERA arguing that it "would lead to women being drafted by the military and to public unisex bathrooms."

The most influential ERA opponent was Phyllis Schlafly, right-wing leader of the Eagle Forum/STOP ERA. She argues that the ERA would deny a woman's right to be supported by her husband, privacy rights would be overturned, women would be sent into combat, and abortion rights and same-sex marriages would be upheld.

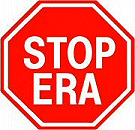
Logo used for signs and buttons by opponents

Experts agree that Schlafly's organization skills were decisive in causing the defeat. Political scientist Jane Mansbridge in her history of the ERA concludes:

Many people who followed the struggle over the ERA believed—rightly in my view—that the Amendment would have been ratified by 1975 or 1976 had it not been for Phyllis Schlafly's early and effective effort to organize potential opponents.

Joan C. Williams argues, "ERA was defeated when Schlafly turned it into a war among women over gender roles." Historian Judith Glazer-Raymo argues:

As moderates, we thought we represented the forces of reason and goodwill but failed to take seriously the power of the family values argument and the single-mindedness of Schlafly and her followers. The ERA's defeat seriously damaged the women's movement, destroying its momentum and its potential to foment social change....Eventually, this resulted in feminist dissatisfaction with the Republican Party, giving the Democrats a new source of strength that when combined with overwhelming minority support, helped elect Bill Clinton to the presidency in 1992 and again in 1996.

==== The radical feminist movement ====
Second-wave feminism was diverse in its causes and goals. During the late 1960s and early 1970s, parallel with the counterculture movements, women with more radical ideas about feminist goals began to organize. In her work, Daring to Be Bad: Radical Feminism in America, 1967–1975, historian Alice Echols gives a thorough description of the short-lived movement. The radical feminists were after not only the end of female oppression by men but, as Echols notes, "They also fought for safe, effective, accessible contraception; the repeal of all abortion laws; the creation of high-quality, community-controlled child-care centers; and an end to the media's objectification of women. "

Small protests and signs of a larger support for radical feminism became more cohesive during the Students for a Democratic Society (SDS) June 1967 National Convention in Ann Arbor. The "Women's Liberation Workshop" denounced sexual inequality and stated, "As we analyze the position of women in capitalist society and especially the United States we find that women are in a colonial relationship to men and we recognize ourselves as part of the Third World." Co-written by Jane Addams, one of the most prominent women in SDS, they argued that women's place within SDS was subordinate and revolution could not succeed without women's liberation.

SDS women, including Susan Stern of the Weathermen, and women from the Old Left, including Clara Fraser and Gloria Martin, came together to found Radical Women in Seattle in November 1967. Radical Women identified as socialist feminist and described its political views in "The Radical Women Manifesto." The group called for multi-issue struggle around issues of sex, race and class and defended lesbian/gay rights. Radical Women celebrated its 50th anniversary of activism in 2017. (There is no relationship between Radical Women and the short-lived group known as New York Radical Women.)

While radical feminists agreed that a separate movement for them was needed, how that movement looked and its ultimate goals caused much divide. They questioned whether they should include men within their movement, whether they should focus on issues of war, race and class, and who or what it was they were exactly rallying against. There were also issues concerning African American women within the movement; while the radical feminists felt gender to be the greatest issue, African American women were also very much concerned with racism and many found that to be where oppression was most domineering. Despite being inspired by the black power movement, radical feminists had difficulty figuring out a place for race within their gender-centric movement. They were also divided over the place of lesbianism in the movement.

Notable radical feminist groups included Redstockings, founded in 1969. The group focused on power dynamics in gender and promoted consciousness-raising and distributed movement literature for free. Cell 16, founded in 1968, was a much more militant group arguing that women were conditioned by their sex-roles. The Feminists, founded by Ti-Grace Atkinson in 1968, claimed women were complicit in their oppression and needed to shed conventional gender roles. New York Radical Feminists, founded in 1969, also found maleness to be the greater issue than power roles. They were interested in building a larger movement through mass numbers in New York City.

Echols describes the movement's end: "Radical feminism remained the hegemonic tendency within the women's liberation movement until 1973 when cultural feminism began to cohere and challenge its dominance. After 1975, a year of internecine conflicts between radical and cultural feminists, cultural feminism eclipsed radical feminism as the dominant tendency within the women's liberation movement, and, as a consequence, liberal feminism became the recognized voice of the women's movement." The end of the counterculture movements and the government's observation of the movement also contributed to its end. The radical feminist movement demonstrated that Second-wave feminism was diverse in its goals, but also divided within itself. Echols notes, "To many women, liberal feminism's considerably more modest goal of bringing women into the mainstream seemed more palatable, not to mention more realistic, than the radical feminist project of fundamentally reconstructing private and public life." She also states that despite the fact that younger generations does not often see this movement as relevant, it is because feminist movements during this time actually did make significant changes.

==== Abortion ====
One of the most controversial developments in American women's lives has been the changing law regarding abortion. In 1973, in the Supreme Court case Roe v. Wade, the Supreme Court ruled that it was an illegal violation of privacy to outlaw or regulate any aspect of abortion performed during the first trimester of pregnancy, and that government could only enact abortion regulations reasonably related to maternal health in the second and third trimesters, and could enact abortion laws protecting the life of the fetus only in the third trimester. Furthermore, even in the third trimester, the Supreme Court ruled an exception had to be made to protect the life of the mother. This ruling was extremely controversial from the moment it was made. Linda Coffee and Sarah Weddington brought the lawsuit that led to Roe v. Wade on behalf of a pregnant woman, Dallas area resident Norma L. McCorvey ("Jane Roe"), claiming a Texas law criminalizing most abortions violated Roe's constitutional rights. The Texas law banned all abortions except those necessary to save the life of the mother, and Roe claimed that while her life was not endangered, she could not afford to travel out of state and had a right to terminate her pregnancy in a safe medical environment. In 2022, the Supreme Court overruled Roe v. Wade in Dobbs v. Jackson Women's Health Organization on the grounds that the substantive right to abortion was not "deeply rooted in this Nation's history or tradition", nor considered a right when the Due Process Clause was ratified in 1868, and was unknown in U.S. law until Roe v. Wade. Dobbs v. Jackson Women's Health Organization also overturned Planned Parenthood v. Casey (1992), and devolved to state governments the authority to regulate any aspect of abortion that federal law does not preempt, as "direct control of medical practice in the states is beyond the power of the federal government" and the federal government has no general police power over health, education, and welfare.

==== Sports ====
One of the most famous feminist media events was the tennis match known as the "Battle of the Sexes." In this match, on September 20, 1973, in Houston, Texas, women's tennis champion Billie Jean King defeated Bobby Riggs 6–4, 6–3, 6–3, before a worldwide television audience estimated at almost 50 million. 55-year-old former tennis champion Bobby Riggs had defeated Australian tennis player Margaret Court earlier that year, and he was an outspoken opponent of feminism, saying for example, "If a woman wants to get in the headlines, she should have quintuplets," " and calling himself a "male chauvinist pig".

==== Legal gains ====
There were a few important legal gains for women in the mid-1970s. The Equal Credit Opportunity Act, enacted in 1974, illegalizes credit discrimination on the basis of race, color, religion, national origin, sex, marital status, age, or because someone receives public assistance. Due to this Act, creditors may ask you for most of this information in certain situations, but they may not use it when deciding whether to give you credit or when setting the terms of your credit. In the 1975 Supreme Court case Taylor v Louisiana, the Supreme Court ruled that excluding women from the jury pool is illegal because it violates a person's right to a fair trial by a representative segment of the community. In 1978, the Pregnancy Discrimination Act was passed, making employment discrimination on the basis of pregnancy, childbirth, or related medical conditions illegal.

==== Vietnam War ====
Another important event around this time was the Vietnam War. Approximately 7,000 American military women served in Vietnam during the Vietnam War (1965–1975), the majority of them as nurses. An Army nurse, Sharon Ann Lane, was the only U.S. military woman to die from enemy fire in Vietnam. An Air Force flight nurse, Capt. Mary Therese Klinker, died when the C-5A Galaxy transport evacuating Vietnamese orphans which she was aboard crashed on takeoff. Six other American military women also died in the line of duty. An important gain for military women occurred when in 1976, the five federal United States Service academies (West Point, Coast Guard Academy, Naval Academy, Air Force Academy, Merchant Marines Academy) were required to admit women as a result of Public Law 94-106 signed by President Gerald Ford on October 7, 1975. The law passed the House by a vote of 303 to 96 and the Senate by voice vote after divisive argument within Congress, resistance from the Department of Defense and legal action initiated by women to challenge their exclusion. More than 300 women enrolled in the academies in 1976.

==== Domestic violence and rape ====
During the 1970s, feminists also worked to bring greater attention and help to women suffering from domestic violence and rape. Before the 1970s, very little help was available to battered women. In the 1970s, some of the first battered women's shelters were created and states began adopting domestic violence laws providing for civil orders of protection and better police protection (the first women's shelter in the modern world was Haven House, which opened in 1964 in California). It is not true that either Catharine MacKinnon or Andrea Dworkin (both feminist activists) said "all sex is rape", or "all men are rapists," or "all sex is sexual harassment", as has been rumored; however, during the 1970s feminist activists worked to change laws stating that there had to be a witness other than the woman herself to charge a man with rape, and that a woman's sexual history could be brought up at trial, while the alleged rapist's could not. Also, due to feminist activism the first law against marital rape (raping one's spouse) was enacted by South Dakota in 1975. By 1993, marital rape had become a crime in all 50 states in America.

=== 1980s ===
The 1980s brought more firsts for American women. 1980 was the first year that a higher percentage of women than men voted in a Presidential election, and a higher percentage of women than men have voted in every Presidential election since. In 1981, Sandra Day O'Connor was confirmed unanimously by the Senate and became the first female Supreme Court Justice. In 1983, Sally Ride became the first female American astronaut. In 1984, Geraldine Ferraro became the first woman nominated for Vice President by a major party (the Democratic Party), although she was not elected.

Also, in 1984 Kathryn D. Sullivan became the first American woman to walk in space. In 1987, Wilma Mankiller became the first woman to be elected chief of a major Native American tribe (Cherokee). In 1991, she was re-elected with 83% of the vote; during her tenure the Cherokee nation's membership more than doubled, to 170,000 from about 68,000. In 1987, Congress declared March as the first National Women's History Month. A special Presidential Proclamation is issued every year since which honors the achievements of American women.

=== 1990s ===
Younger women now began to be more involved in feminism. In the early 1990s, third wave feminism began as a response to the second wave's perceived inadequacies and shortcomings. Third wave feminism, which continues today, is most often associated with a younger generation of feminist activism, an interest in popular culture and sexual agency, and an acceptance of pluralism and contradiction. In 1991, in Olympia, Washington, Riot grrrl began in reaction to the domination of the punk rock scene of America's Pacific Northwest by all-male bands, and as an attempt to establish a female-friendly presence within this scene. Riot grrrl consisted of feminist punk bands such as Bikini Kill and Bratmobile, and their zines, meetings and songs.

The concerns of military women again came to the fore as the Persian Gulf War (1990–1991) utilized an unprecedented proportion of women from the active forces (7%) as well as the Reserve and National Guard (17%). Over 40,000 US military women served in combat support positions throughout the war. Sixteen women died during the war and two were held prisoner. In 1991, the Tailhook Scandal occurred at the annual Tailhook Association convention held in Las Vegas, with more than 26 women (14 of them officers) being assaulted by scores of drunken naval and marine officers. Accusations that the Navy mishandled the subsequent investigation were deeply damaging to the Navy's reputation.

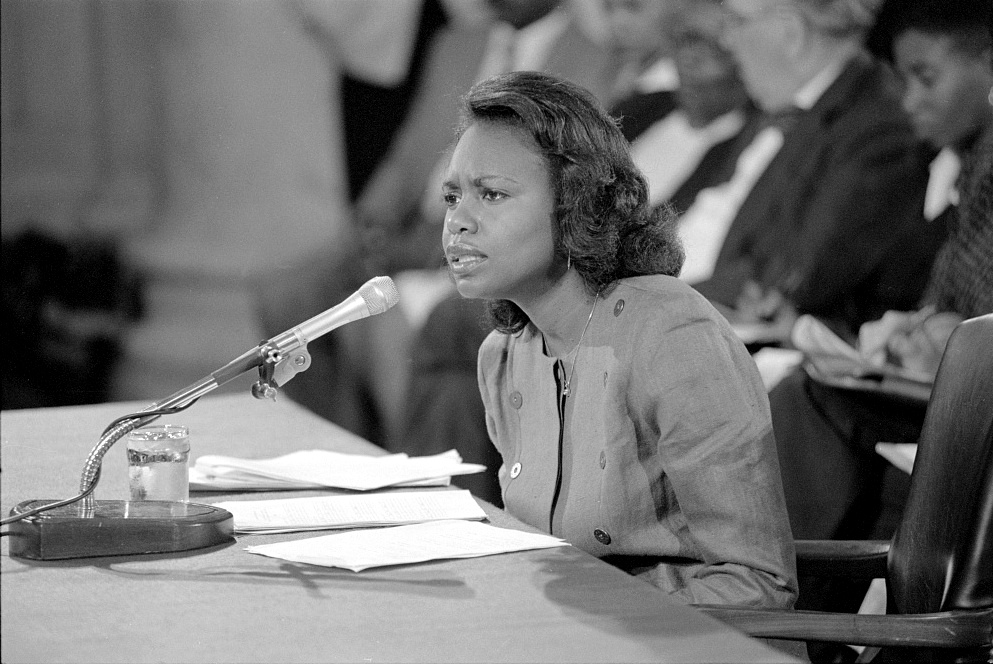
Anita Hill testifying in front of the Senate Judiciary Committee

Another famous sexual harassment case occurred when in 1991 Anita Hill, a law professor at the University of Oklahoma, came forward with accusations that Clarence Thomas (who had just been nominated for the Supreme Court) had sexually harassed her. Hill had worked for Thomas years earlier when he was head of the Equal Employment Opportunity Commission, and she charged that Thomas harassed her with inappropriate discussion of sexual acts and pornographic films after she rebuffed his invitations to date him. When Thomas testified against Hill's claims before the Senate Judiciary Committee, he called the hearings, "a high-tech lynching for uppity blacks," although Hill herself was black. In the end, the Senate voted 52–48 to confirm Clarence Thomas as an associate justice of the Supreme Court.

The 1990s brought more firsts for women in politics and the military. 1992 was known as the "Year of the Woman" because more women than ever before were elected to political office that year (women gained 19 House and 3 Senate seats for a total of 47 seats in the House and seven seats in the Senate) including Carol Moseley Braun, the first black female senator. In 1993, Ruth Bader Ginsburg was confirmed by Congress as a Supreme Court Justice, becoming the second woman on the court. In 1994, Shannon Faulkner applied to The Citadel, The Military College of South Carolina and was accepted for admission. She had left her gender information off the application. When it was discovered that she was a woman, The Citadel revoked her offer, so Faulkner filed suit against The Citadel to gain admission. The court rejected The Citadel's arguments, clearing her way to attend the school under court order. Faulkner became the first female cadet in 1995, but resigned a few days into her first week. A similar case occurred about this time that forced the Virginia Military Institute to open its doors to women. On June 28, 1996, two days after the U.S. Supreme Court's decision in United States v Virginia, the Citadel's governing board voted unanimously to remove a person's gender as a requirement for admission. In 1999, Nancy Mace became the first woman to graduate from the Citadel. The first women graduated from the Virginia Military Institute in 2001 (Melissa Graham of Burleson, Texas, and Chih-Yuan Ho of Taipei, Taiwan).

Two important cases concerning women's rights were litigated in the late 1990s. The Matter of Kasinga was a legal case decided in June 1996 involving Fauziya Kassindja (surname also spelled as Kasinga), a Togolese teenager seeking asylum in the United States in order to escape a tribal practice of female genital mutilation. The Board of Immigration Appeals granted her asylum in June 1996 after an earlier judge denied her claims. The case set a precedent in United States immigration law as applicants could now seek asylum in the United States from gender-based persecution, whereas previously religious or political grounds were often used to grant asylum. In 1999, Lilly Ledbetter, a supervisor at a Goodyear tire plant in Alabama, sued Goodyear because she was being paid at least 15% less than the men who held the same job. A jury sided with her and awarded her back pay of $224,000 and nearly $3.3 million in punitive damages, but the company appealed, arguing she filed her claim too late, and it won a reversal from a U.S. appeals court in Atlanta. In 2007, the Supreme Court agreed with the company (in Ledbetter v. Goodyear Tire & Rubber Co.) and ruled that her suit should have been thrown out at the start because it relied on evidence of discrimination in the 1980s, not on unfair pay decisions in 1998 or 1999; the Supreme Court declared that employees wishing to file discrimination charges must do so no more than 180 days after they have received their first discriminatory paycheck, although Lilly Ledbetter did not know she had been discriminated against in pay until much more than 180 days had passed. However, in 2009 President Barack Obama signed the Lilly Ledbetter Fair Pay Act into law (the first bill signed into law during his presidency), which changed the law so that now workers can sue up to 180 days after receiving any discriminatory paycheck, not just the first discriminatory paycheck.

=== 2000–2016 ===
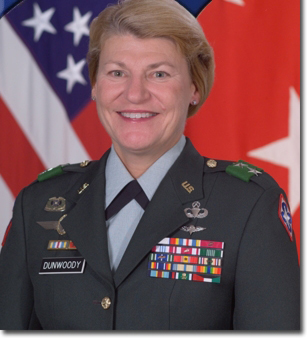
Ann Dunwoody, the first female four-star general in the United States military (shown while two-star general).

American women served in the Iraq War from 2003 until 2011. This time included several firsts for women in the military. In 2008, Ann Dunwoody became the first female four-star general in the United States military. In 2011, Sandra Stosz assumed command of the U.S. Coast Guard Academy, becoming the first woman superintendent of that institution, and the first woman to command any U.S. service academy. Also in 2011, Patricia Horoho became the first female U.S. Army surgeon general.

In 2004, Del Martin and Phyllis Lyon became the first same-sex couple to be legally married in the United States, since San Francisco Mayor Gavin Newsom allowed city hall to grant marriage licenses to same-sex couples. However, all same-sex marriages done in 2004 in California were annulled. But after the California Supreme Court decision in 2008 that granted same-sex couples in California the right to marry, Del Martin and Phyllis Lyon remarried, and were again the first same-sex couple in the state to marry. Later in 2008 Prop 8 illegalized same-sex marriage in California until Prop 8 was overturned in 2013, but the marriages that occurred between the California Supreme Court decision legalizing same-sex marriage and the approval of Prop 8 illegalizing it are still considered valid, including the marriage of Del Martin and Phyllis Lyon.

American women achieved many political firsts in the 2000s. In 2007, Nancy Pelosi became the first female Speaker of the House of Representatives; she held the position for just under four years. In 2008, Democratic presidential candidate Hillary Clinton became the first woman to win a presidential primary, winning the New Hampshire Democratic primary although polls had predicted she would lose. She eventually lost the Democratic nomination for President to Barack Obama, who went on to become President; however, Hillary Clinton did receive 18 million votes. In 2008, Alaska governor Sarah Palin became the first woman nominated for Vice President by the Republican Party, although she was not elected. In 2009, and 2010, respectively, Sonia Sotomayor and Elena Kagan were confirmed as Supreme Court Associate Justices, making them the third and fourth female justices, but because Justice O'Connor had previously retired, this made the first time three women have served together on the Supreme Court. Sen. Barbara Mikulski of Maryland was re-elected to a fifth term in 2010; when the 112th Congress was sworn in, she became the longest serving female senator ever, passing Sen. Margaret Chase Smith. During this term, she surpassed Edith Nourse Rogers as the woman to serve the longest in the U.S. Congress.

In 2009, due to the Matthew Shepard and James Byrd, Jr. Hate Crimes Prevention Act being signed into law, the definition of federal hate crime was expanded to include those violent crimes in which the victim is selected due to their actual or perceived gender and/or gender identity; previously federal hate crimes were defined as only those violent crimes where the victim is selected due to their race, color, religion, or national origin. Furthermore, the Matthew Shepard and James Byrd, Jr. Hate Crimes Prevention Act requires the Federal Bureau of Investigation to track statistics on hate crimes based on gender and gender identity (statistics for the other groups were already tracked).

The White House Council on Women and Girls, a council which formed part of the Office of Intergovernmental Affairs, was established by Executive Order 13506 on March 11, 2009 with a broad mandate to advise the United States President on issues relating to the welfare of women and girls. (The Council was not convened during the Trump administration and was disbanded in 2017.)

In March 2011, the Barack Obama administration released a report, Women in America: Indicators of Social and Economic Well-Being, showing women's status in the U.S. in 2011 and how it had changed over time. This report was the first comprehensive federal report on women since the report produced by the Commission on the Status of Women in 1963.

In December 2015, Defense Secretary Ash Carter stated that starting in 2016 all combat jobs would open to women.

=== Trump and Biden era 2015–present ===
In July 2016 Hillary Clinton became the Democratic nominee for President of the U.S., making her the first woman on a major party ticket to receive the nomination for President of the United States. While she lost the electoral college vote to Donald Trump, she notably won the popular vote by millions of votes, becoming the first woman to win it. According to Leandra Zarnow, Donald Trump made anti-feminism a central theme of his presidential campaign in 2016 against Democrat Hillary Clinton, the first woman candidate for president from a major party. Once in office, he emphasized themes of masculinity, and traditional gender roles, appealing especially to his religious base. He did appoint a few senior women, including Nikki Haley as ambassador to the United Nations from 2017 to 2018. His key female appointment was his daughter Ivanka Trump as a major advisor in numerous areas. Trump staffed his press office with talented conservative women. At every turn he rejected feminist issues, especially regarding abortion rights. The Trump coalition strongly opposed abortion, and made this part of foreign policy by reinstating the Mexico City policy (sometimes referred to by its critics as the global gag rule).. This ended funding for overseas NGOs that promoted abortion as a form of family planning, or provided information, referrals or counselling to enable an abortion.

In response feminists organized and rallied. The Women's March, the largest single-day demonstration in U.S. history, was a worldwide protest on January 21, 2017, to advocate legislation and policies regarding human rights and other issues, including women's rights, immigration reform, healthcare reform, the natural environment, LGBTQ rights, racial equality, freedom of religion, and workers' rights. The rallies were aimed at Donald Trump, immediately following his inauguration as President of the United States, largely due to statements and positions attributed to him regarded by many as anti-women or otherwise offensive. Angry women marchers sometimes carried posters featuring offensive or obscene humor to ridule Trump's body, his misogyny and his pussy grabbing, with slogans such as, "Keep your tiny hands off my human rights!.". Social media became a force as the MeToo movement demonstrated. The hashtag #MeToo went viral in late 2017. Facebook reported that almost half of its American users were friends with someone who felt they had been sexually assaulted or harassed. Success came with major Democratic gains. In 2018 the largest number of women ever were elected to Congress, with Democrat Nancy Pelosi as Speaker of the House. In 2020 Trump was defeated and Republicans lost the Senate.

In 2020, U.S. Senator Kamala Harris of California was selected as the vice presidential nominee for the Democratic ticket. Harris was the third woman and first African American as well as first Asian American to win a place on a major party presidential ticket. In November 2020, Joseph Biden and Harris were elected President and Vice President, securing victories in both the electoral college and the popular vote. They won the electoral college 306 to 232 and secured a popular vote victory with a more than 7 million vote lead over the Republican incumbent ticket. Thus Harris became the first woman, and first person of color, elected to the vice presidency in American history. She was inaugurated on January 20, 2021 becoming the 49th Vice President of the United States and highest ranking woman in U.S. history. Harris would later become the first woman to serve as Acting President of the United States, in November of 2021.

In 2022, the Supreme Court overruled Roe v. Wade in Dobbs v. Jackson Women's Health Organization on the grounds that the substantive right to abortion was not "deeply rooted in this Nation's history or tradition", nor considered a right when the Due Process Clause was ratified in 1868, and was unknown in U.S. law until Roe v. Wade. Dobbs v. Jackson Women's Health Organization also overturned Planned Parenthood v. Casey (1992), and devolved to state governments the authority to regulate any aspect of abortion that federal law does not preempt, as "direct control of medical practice in the states is beyond the power of the federal government" and the federal government has no general police power over health, education, and welfare.

== Historiography ==
=== Popular history ===
Women's history has a long historiography of popular writing as non-academics in new women's societies succeeded in shaping public memory and history education in American school houses, albeit along racially segregated lines. The earliest histories of American women were authored during the 19th century non-academic women writers reaching out to popular audiences, or to document the history of women's civic and activist organizations. For example, abolitionists Sarah Grimke and Lydia Maria Child wrote brief histories of women in the 1830s, while Elizabeth Ellet wrote The Women of the American Revolution (1845), Domestic History of the American Revolution (1850), and Pioneer Women of the West (1852). Meanwhile, women's organizations like the Women's Christian Temperance Union, National American Woman Suffrage Association, and National Association of Colored Women published their own institutional histories. New patriotic societies like the Daughters of the American Revolution and the United Daughters of the Confederacy created "filiopietistic" publications on history and women in history, developed school curricula, and engaged in historic preservation work. Both black and white women in women's clubs actively participated in this work during the twentieth century in their efforts to shape the broader culture.

In the early twentieth century, for example, the United Daughters of the Confederacy (UDC) coordinated efforts across the South to tell the story of the Confederacy and its women on the Confederate home front, while male historians spent their time with battles and generals. The women emphasized female activism, initiative, and leadership. They reported that when all the men left for war, the women took command, found ersatz and substitute foods, rediscovered their old traditional skills with the spinning wheel when factory cloth became unavailable, and ran all the farm or plantation operations. They faced danger without having men in the traditional role of their protectors. Historian Jacquelyn Dowd Hall argues that the UDC was a powerful promoter of women's history:

UDC leaders were determined to assert women's cultural authority over virtually every representation of the region's past. This they did by lobbying for state archives and museums, national historic sites, and historic highways; compiling genealogies; interviewing former soldiers; writing history textbooks; and erecting monuments, which now moved triumphantly from cemeteries into town centers. More than half a century before women's history and public history emerged as fields of inquiry and action, the UDC, with other women's associations, strove to etch women's accomplishments into the historical record and to take history to the people, from the nursery and the fireside to the schoolhouse and the public square.

=== Academic historiography ===
The scholarly field of American women's history became a major field of academic inquiry in the 1970s. The subject of women was largely ignored within the historical discipline during the period in which the discipline emerged and professionalized from the 1880s to 1910. The overwhelmingly male new academic discipline saw its purview as relatively limited to the study of the evolution of politics, government, and the law, and emphasized research in official state documents, thus leaving little room for an examination of women's activities or lives.

The most famous call to develop the history of American women came from distinguished Harvard historian Arthur Schlesinger, Sr. in the 1920s and 1930s. His graduate students and their graduate students were major contributors to the scholarly subfield of women's history. The Arthur and Elizabeth Schlesinger Library on the History of Women in America at Harvard, for example, was founded in 1943 as the Radcliffe Woman's Archives. Between 1957 and 1971, this library produced a seminal scholarly reference work on women in American history, Notable American Women: A Biographical Dictionary, 1607–1950 (1971). It coordinated the work of hundreds of historians—men and women—and was published to widespread acclaim in 1971.

Academic historians, meanwhile, sporadically produced and reviewed scholarly monographs in American women's history from the 1930s through the 1950s as well. The work of Alma Lutz, Elisabeth Anthony Dexter, Julia Cherry Spruill, Antoinette Elizabeth Taylor, Mary Elizabeth Massey, Caroline Ware, and especially Eleanor Flexner and Mary Ritter Beard, all focused on the history of American women. They were relatively well-known during their time, even if some of these scholars did not enjoy insider status within the historical profession.

In response to the new social history of the 1960s and the modern women's movement, increasing numbers of scholars, especially female graduate students training in universities across the country, began to focus on the history of women. They initially struggled to find mentors in male-dominated history departments. Students in the Columbia University History Department produced several early significant works in the 1960s. Gerda Lerner's dissertation, published as The Grimke Sisters of South Carolina, in 1967, and Aileen Kraditor's The Ideas of the Woman Suffrage Movement, published in 1965 are just two notable examples. Ann Firor Scott, a graduate of Harvard, who studied under Oscar Handlin in the 1950s, wrote a dissertation on the Southern Progressive movement, discovering the existence of many female progressives in her research. By 1970, she had published The Southern Lady: From the Pedestal to Politics. These new ventures into women's history were made within mainstream academic institutions. Lerner and Scott would become leading lights and organizers for the field's younger practitioners in the coming decades. Their contributions to American history were recognized by the Organization of American Historians and the Southern Historical Association when they were elected to the presidencies of those professional organizations in the early 1980s.

The field of women's history exploded after 1969. New historians of women organized within the major national historical associations from 1969 forward to promote scholarship about women. This included the American Historical Association, the Organization of American Historians, and the Southern Historical Association. Each created status-of-women committees and made developing women's history a major goal. They started by gathering data and writing bibliographies in the field to identify areas in need of study. Then they completed the research and produced the monographs that vitalized this field. They also created around a dozen regional women's history organizations and conference groups of their own to support their scholarly work and build intellectual and professional networks. These included the Coordinating Committee on Women in the Historical Profession—Conference Group on Women's History (1969), the Berkshire Conference on the History of Women (1973), West Coast Association of Women Historians (1970), Women Historians of the Midwest(1973), Southern Association for Women Historians (1970), Upstate New York Women's History Organization (1975), New England Association of Women Historians (1972), Association of Black Women Historians (1979), and others.

The scholarship this growing cohort of historians created was soon vast, diverse, and theoretically complex. Almost from its inception, the new women's history of the 1970s focused on the differential experiences of white women of diverse backgrounds, women of color, working class women, relations of power between men and women, women's social and political activism, and how to integrate women's history into mainstream American history narratives. There was a pervasive concern with understanding the impact of race, class, gender, and sexuality on the histories of women—despite later claims to the contrary. By the late 1970s and early 1980s, American women's historians like Elizabeth Fox-Genovese and Joan Kelly were considering sexual relations of power, sex roles; the problem of fitting women's history into traditional frameworks of periodization; and Joan Wallach Scott's call to apply gender as a "Useful Category of Historical Analysis." In the U.S., historians of women in Europe, America, and the rest of the world collaborated by working together in the discipline's professional institutions, and in the triennial Berkshire Conference on the History of Women. This "Big Berks Conference," which met for the first time at Douglass College (the women's coordinate college of Rutgers University), in 1973, for the second time at Radcliffe College in 1974, and then again in 1976 at Bryn Mawr College, quickly became a women's history institution in the United States. Here, historians of women presented their recent research, planned for the future of women's history, and shared one another's theoretical insights to strengthen the standing of women's history in academia broadly across the traditional boundaries of regional/geographic specialization. The Big Berks has been regularly attended by over a thousand scholars from around the world every three years up until 2020, when the COVID-19 pandemic forced the conference organizers to cancel the planned meeting at Johns Hopkins University for the first time in 46 years.

An important development of the 1980s was the fuller integration of women into the history of race and slavery and race into the history of women. This work was preceded by the work of black club women, historic preservationists, archivists, and educators in the early twentieth century. Black women's double marginalization from the historical profession, on the basis of race and sex, led credentialed black female historians of the mid-century to focus on rather traditional historical topics in their research prior to the Civil Rights Era. Gerda Lerner published a significant document reader, Black Women in White America in 1972 (Pantheon Publishers). The close historical ties between the history of the 19th-century women's movement and the 19th-century abolitionist movement and the involvement of female historians of the 1960s and 1970s in the movements of the New Left, including the civil rights movement, fostered considerable interest by white female historians in the history of black women as a corollary to their interest in social movement history generally. For example, Sara Evans and Jacquelyn Dowd Hall wrote important dissertations addressing the historical intersections between women's social justice activism and race during the 1960s that were published in the 1970s. These studies were however, only partly focused on black women. By the 1970s though, African-American female historians were completing dissertations and seeking presses to publish their research. Rosalyn Terborg-Penn completed her dissertation on African-American female suffragists in 1977. Shortly thereafter she and Sharon Harley published a collection of important essays in The Afro-American Woman: Struggles and Images in 1978. Deborah Gray White's Ar'n't I a Woman? Female Slaves in the Plantation South (1985) helped to open up analysis of race, slavery, abolitionism and feminism, as well as resistance, power, activism, and themes of violence, sexualities, and the body. The professional service of Darlene Clark Hine, Rosalyn Terborg-Penn, and Nell Irvin Painter and their scholarship on African-American women continued to break important ground in the 1980s and 1990s. This included their active participation in mainstream history associations and the establishment of the Association of Black Women Historians in 1979. Native American, Latino and Asian-American scholars also strove to recover and incorporate the history of women in these subfields and found outlets for their work in women's history publications and conferences.

By the late 1980s, women's history in the United States had matured and proliferated enough to support its own standalone scholarly journal to showcase scholarship in the field. The major women's history journal published in the U.S. is The Journal of Women's History, launched in 1989 by Joan Hoff and Christie Farnham Pope. It was first published out of Indiana University and continues to be published quarterly today, though its editorial headquarters rotates to different universities. Indeed, the field became so prolific and established by the turn of the 21st century in fact that it had become one of the most commonly claimed fields of specialization of all professional historians in the U.S., according to Robert Townsend of the American Historical Association. Major trends in the history of American women in recent years have emphasized the study of global and transnational histories of women and histories of conservative women.

Women's history continues to be an active field in the United States, with new research regularly published across general, regional, and subfield- focused historical journals.

== See also ==
- American Association of University Women (AAUW)
- Coordinating Council for Women in History (CCWHP), historians of women
- Feminism in the United States
- Gender inequality in the United States
- History of childhood in the United States
- Married Women's Property Acts in the United States
- Timeline of second-wave feminism
- Transgender rights in the United States

=== Commemoration ===
- Women's History Sites (U.S. National Park Service)
- The Arthur and Elizabeth Schlesinger Library on the History of Women in America

=== By topic ===
- History of Chinese Americans
- History of Japanese Americans
- Women in education
  - Timeline
- Timeline of women's colleges
- Timeline of women in the history of America
- Women's suffrage
  - History
  - Timeline
- Sports
  - 20th century fitness culture
- History of lesbianism
- Woman's club movement
- Women's health movement

Lists

- Firsts
  - First female-majority city councils
  - First holders of political offices
- Kentucky women in the civil rights era
