= Banks Turner =

American politician (1889–1953)

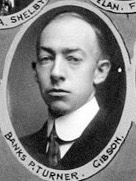
- Photo of Turner in the Tennessee legislature

Member of the Tennessee House of Representatives from the Gibson, Tennessee district
- In office 1918–1922

Personal details
- Born: September 14, 1889
- Died: January 11, 1953 (aged 63)
- Party: Democratic
- Spouse: Ivie Dorothy McGee

Banks Pearson Turner (September 14, 1889 – January 11, 1953) was a Democratic member of the Tennessee General Assembly for Gibson, Tennessee. He is best remembered for action taken to ratify the Nineteenth Amendment during his first term in the legislature. Turner was one of two state House members who changed his previous inclination to vote from a no to a yes in August 1920, thus ensuring the passage (and ratification) of the Nineteenth Amendment to the US Constitution.

== Childhood and Education ==
Turner attended Castle Heights Military Academy and Vanderbilt Law School and received his law degree from YMCA Law School in Nashville, TN.

== 19th Amendment ==
The Nineteenth Amendment, regarding Women's suffrage, was proposed by Congress on June 4, 1919. The amendment could not become law without the ratification of a minimum thirty-six of the forty-eight states. By the summer of 1920, thirty-five of the forty-eight states had ratified the amendment, with a further four states called upon to hold legislative voting sessions on the issue. Three of those states refused to call special sessions, but Tennessee agreed to do so. This session was called to meet in August 1920. After much debating and argument, the result of the vote was 48:48. Two pivotal votes broke the tie: that of Turner and Harry T. Burn. Their two votes broke the tie in favor of ratifying the amendment.

Turner was a professed opponent of ratification. Two votes were called for tabling the motion, and Turner voted against both votes. Notably, rather than simply voting "Nay" as the other opponents had, Turner said, “I wish to be recorded as against the motion to table.” It is thought that pressure from the Democratic governors of Tennessee and Ohio, likely also influenced by Woodrow Wilson, caused Turner to vote against his inclinations towards his local constituency. Democrats felt that the Nineteenth Amendment was good for them nationally, so Turner was supporting the will of his party. After the two failed votes to table the motion, a vote was called to ratify the Nineteenth Amendment. Turner voted in favor. As the clerk called “Turner,” he arose once again and shouted “Aye.” The resolution had carried by a vote of 49 to 47.

== Public career ==
Turner was an attorney in Gibson County. He moved to Nashville in 1923 and was a corporation clerk in the Office of the Secretary of State. He returned to Gibson County in 1937 to practice law in Trenton, TN. He was a magistrate of the Gibson County Court for several years before his death.

== Personal life ==
He married Ivie Dorothy McGee (1892–1989). Turner died on January 11th, 1953. He was a Scottish Rite Mason and member of the Presbyterian Church. He enjoyed farming in later life in the Nebo community.
