= Mount Verd, Tennessee =

Unincorporated community in Tennessee, US

Coordinates: 35°28′42″N 84°36′32″W

Mount Verd is a small unincorporated community in McMinn County, Tennessee, northwest of the city of Athens. Mt. Verd is home to the Mt. Verd Baptist Church.

== Notable people ==
- Febb Burn, schoolteacher who played an important role in the passing of the 19th Amendment
