= List of first female-majority city councils in the United States =

The following is a list of U.S. cities and dates in which their city councils consisted of a majority of women as elected or appointed members.

== List ==
- Kanab, Utah (1911, 5/5)
- Kyle, Texas (1944, 5/5)
- Niota, TN, (1988)
- Newport, Rhode Island (2014, 4/7)
- Asheville, North Carolina (2017, 4/7)
- Amarillo, Texas (2017, 3/5)
- Providence, Rhode Island (2018, 8/15)
- Tulsa, Oklahoma (2018, 6/9)
- Portland, Oregon (2019, 3/5)
- Boston, Massachusetts (2019, 8/13)
- Albuquerque, New Mexico (2019)
- St. Petersburg, Florida (2019, 6/8)
- Bangor, Maine (2019, 6/9)
- Houston, Texas (2019, 9/16)
- South Bend, Indiana (2019, 5/9)
- Knoxville, Tennessee (2019, 7/9)
- San Antonio, Texas (2019, 6/11)
- Pensacola, Florida (2020, 4/7)
- Santa Fe, New Mexico (2020, 5/8)
- Washington, D.C. (2020, 7/13)
- West Hollywood, California (2020, 3/5)
- Phoenix, Arizona (2021, 6/9)
- New York City, (New York City Council) (2022, 31/51)
- Nashville, TN (2022-23, 20/39; 2023, 22/40)
- Saint Paul, Minnesota (2024-, 5/5)
- Munday, Texas (2024, 5/5)
- Snowmass Village, Colorado (2024, 4/5)
- Gulfport, Florida (2025, 5/5)
- Columbia, Missouri (2026, 7/7)
