= Febb Burn =

American schoolteacher and mother

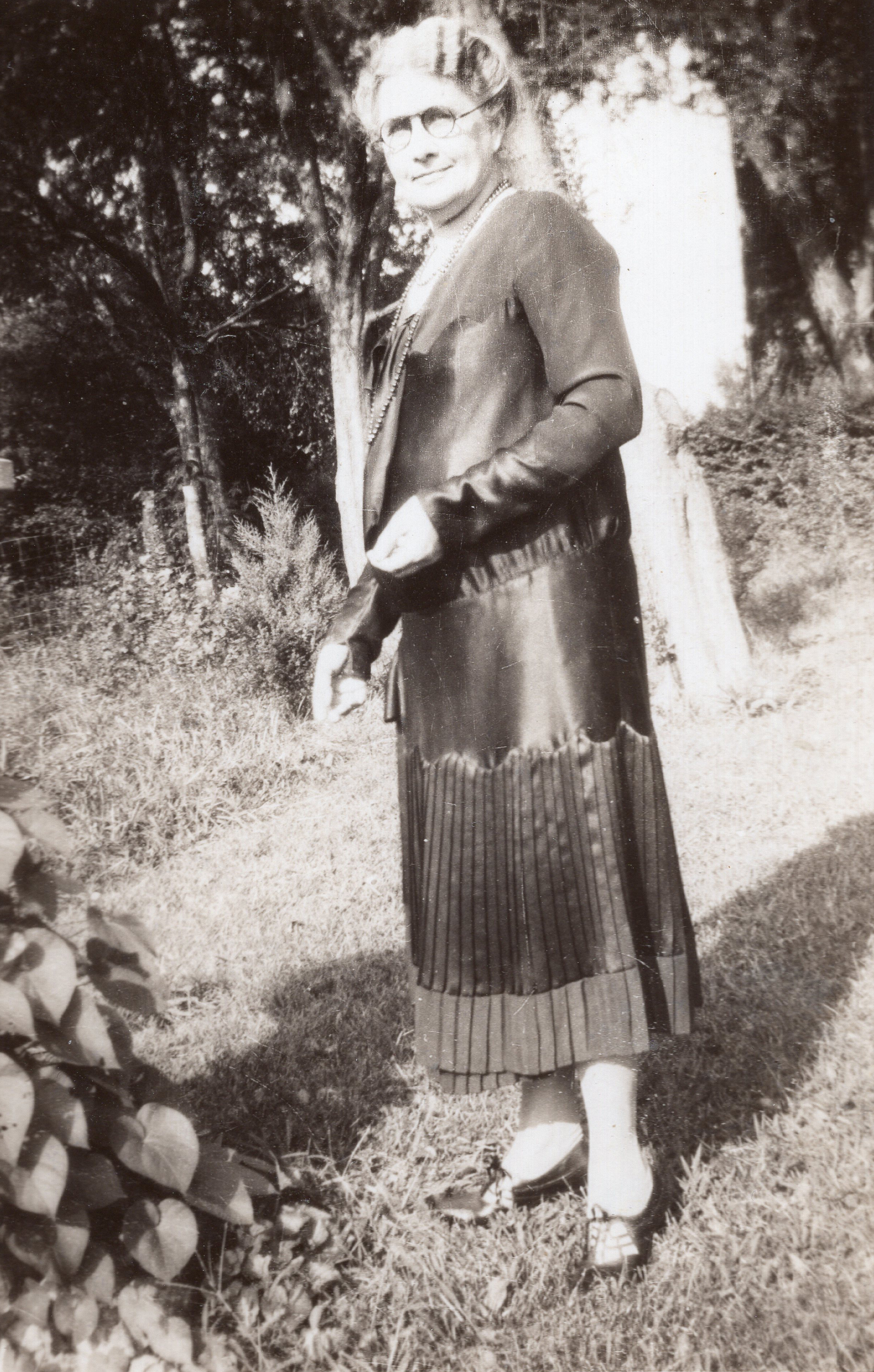
- Burn at her farm
- Born: November 23, 1873; Mount Verd, Tennessee, US
- Died: June 18, 1945 (aged 71); Athens, Tennessee, US
- Education: U.S. Grant Memorial University
- Occupations: Schoolteacher, farmer
- Children: 4, including Harry Burn

Phoebe "Febb" King Ensminger Burn (1873–1945) was an American schoolteacher and farmer. She is credited with playing a crucial role in ensuring the passing of the Nineteenth Amendment to the United States Constitution, which prohibits denying the right to vote to citizens on the basis of sex, effectively recognizing women's right to vote. Through a letter she sent to her son, Tennessee State Representative Harry T. Burn, she influenced him to cast the deciding vote in favor of ratification in Tennessee, the final state needed to ratify the amendment.

== Biography ==
Febb King Ensminger was born in Mount Verd, Tennessee, in 1873. She moved to what is now Niota, Tennessee, with her family in 1889. She graduated from the U.S. Grant Memorial University, now Tennessee Wesleyan University, during a time when very few women attended college.

After college, she married James Lafayette Burn, a stationmaster, and worked as a teacher. She had four children, including Harry T. Burn. After her husband died, she took over managing the family farm in Niota. She encouraged her son Harry's interest in politics and career in public service. She was also passionate about equal rights, often speaking about the matter at home with her family, including Harry. She was said to read three newspapers a day.

During the discussion of the Nineteenth Amendment to the United States Constitution, which would grant suffrage to women, she encouraged her son to vote in favor of the amendment. However, he had settled against voting for it due to political pressures from his voters.

That year, she read about a speech by his political mentor, State Senator Herschel M. Candler, that was vehemently racist and anti-suffrage. Her distaste for this speech led her to include a reminder in her letter to her son telling him to vote in favor of suffrage, saying "Hurrah and vote for suffrage and don’t keep them in doubt" and "Don't forget to be a good boy and help Mrs. Catt". He kept her letter in his pocket on the day of the vote. Her letter is credited with flipping his vote, resulting in him casting the deciding vote in favor of suffrage becoming part of the U.S. Constitution.

In her son's statement the following day, he cited her as the reason for his deciding vote, saying: "I know that a mother’s advice is always safest for her boy to follow, and my mother wanted me to vote for ratification". Burn reported that she was visited by a woman who attempted to persuade her to say that the letter had been false; historian Marjorie Spruill Wheeler has stated that the woman, who Burn said had "claim[ed] to be [the] wife of [the] Governor of Louisiana", was probably Anne Ector Pleasant, who was known to have been in Tennessee at the time, and who was a known opponent of the Nineteenth Amendment because she felt that suffrage should be a state issue rather than a federal issue. Burn remained resolute, however, despite this lecturing and her neighbors' pity at her having a son who voted for suffrage; she later said in an interview: "I am glad he loved me enough to say afterwards my letter had that much influence on him... I don't need any sympathy. I am proud of my son. He has covered himself in glory."

She was the first woman to register to vote in her home county of McMinn County, Tennessee. She died in 1945.

The letter Burn sent to her son which told him to vote for suffrage

== Legacy ==
The Burn Memorial in Knoxville, Tennessee, is a tribute to both her and her son Harry. Her letter is held in the archives of the Knox County Public Library. Her desk is in the McMinn County Living Heritage Museum. Her alma mater Tennessee Wesleyan University established the Febb Burn Society of Women Philanthropists in her honor.

Tennessee passed a law which designated every August 18, the day of the vote for ratification, Febb Burn Day. She is included in the Broadway musical Suffs, where she sings the song A Letter from Harry's Mother.
