= Harry T. Burn =

American politician (1895–1977)

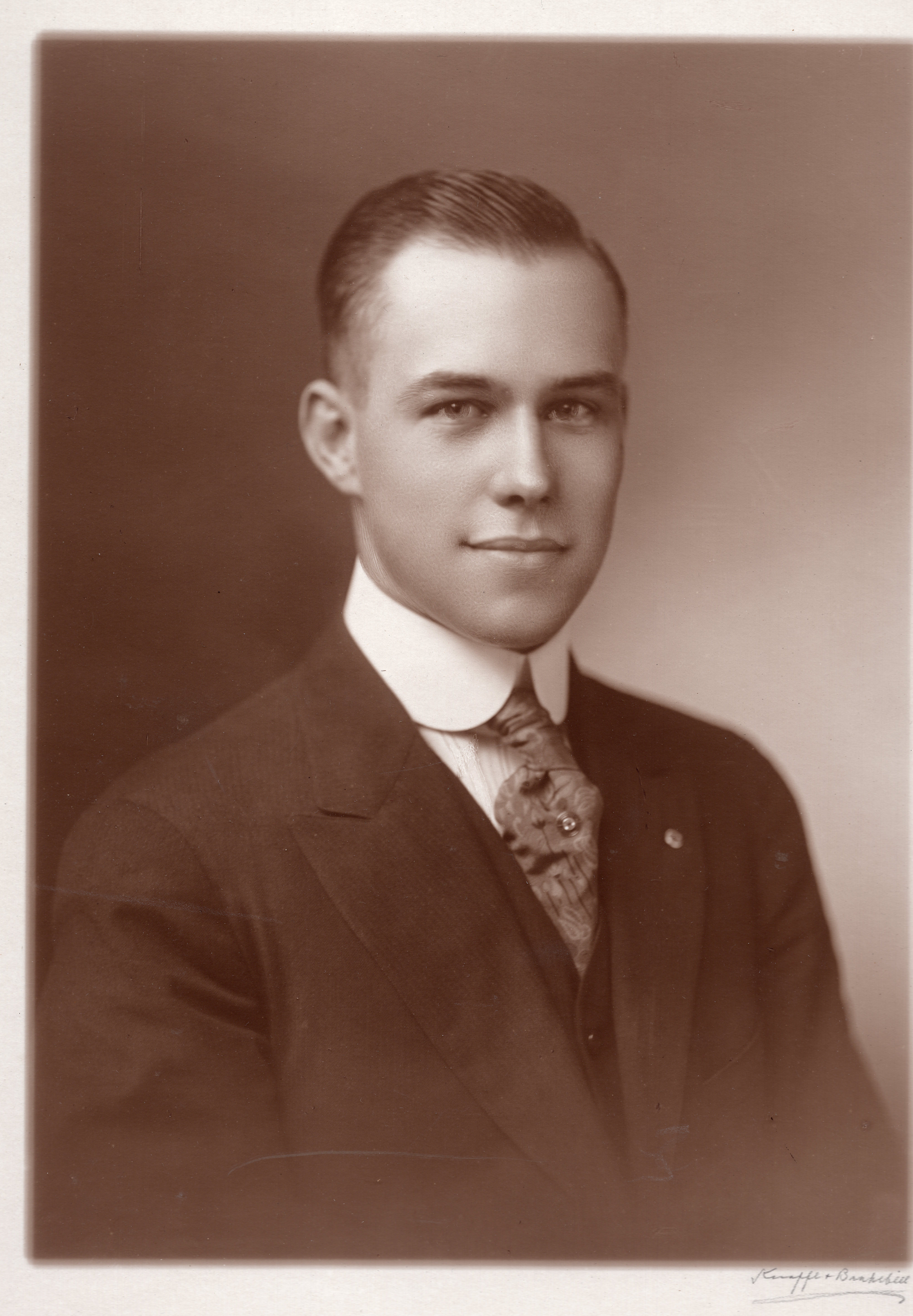
- Burn in 1918

Member of the Tennessee Senate from the 7th district
- In office 1948–1952

Member of the Tennessee House of Representatives from the McMinn County, Tennessee district
- In office 1918–1922

Personal details
- Born: November 12, 1895 Mouse Creek, Tennessee, U.S.
- Died: February 19, 1977 (aged 81) Niota, Tennessee, U.S.
- Party: Republican
- Spouse(s): Mildred Tarwater (1933–1935, div.); Ellen Cottrell (1937–1977)
- Children: Harry Thomas Burn Jr
- Parent(s): James Lafayette Burn; Febb Burn

Harry Thomas Burn Sr. (November 12, 1895 – February 19, 1977) was an American politician. He was a Republican member of the Tennessee General Assembly for McMinn County, Tennessee. Burn became the youngest member of the state legislature when he was elected at the age of twenty-two. He is best remembered for action taken to ratify the Nineteenth Amendment during his first term in the legislature.

== Childhood and education ==
Born in Mouse Creek (now Niota, Tennessee), Burn was the oldest of four children of James Lafayette Burn (1866–1916) and Febb Burn (1873–1945). His father was the stationmaster at the Niota depot, and an entrepreneur in the community. His mother worked as a teacher after her graduation from U.S. Grant Memorial University (now Tennessee Wesleyan University). She later ran the family farm. Burn's siblings were James Lane "Jack" (1897–1955), Sara Margaret (1903–1914), and Otho Virginia (1906–1968). Burn graduated from Niota High School in 1911. He worked for the Southern Railway from 1913 to 1923.

== 19th Amendment ==
The Nineteenth Amendment, regarding female suffrage, was proposed by Congress on June 4, 1919. The amendment could not become law without the ratification of a minimum thirty-six of the forty-eight states. By the summer of 1920, thirty-five of the forty-eight states had ratified the amendment, with a further four states called upon to hold legislative voting sessions on the issue. Three of those states refused to call special sessions, but Tennessee agreed to do so. This session was called to meet in August 1920. The effort to pass the legislation in the House was led by Joe Hanover. Banks Turner and Burn were two critical votes that ultimately tipped the balance to ratification.

Burn had originally intended to vote for the amendment. He had been asked to vote for suffrage by the Democratic and Republican presidential candidates, as well as the chairman of the Republican National Committee. However, some of his constituents made a resolution telling him to oppose the amendment, and he was in the middle of a tight reelection race. After being pressured by party leaders and receiving misleading telegrams from his constituents telling him his district was overwhelmingly opposed to woman suffrage, he began to side with the Antisuffragists. Just before the Tennessee Senate ratified the amendment, Burn's political mentor Herschel M. Candler held a racist anti-suffrage speech denouncing suffragists as indecent and childless. The speech, and Burn's own lack of support for suffrage, provoked Burn's mother into writing her son a long letter asking him to vote in favor of the amendment.

Burn received his mother's letter the morning of the Tennessee House's vote on the amendment, August 18, 1920. Lawmakers displayed their allegiance by wearing yellow roses for ratification or red for opposition, and Burn chose red. However, he kept his mother's letter in his coat pocket during the voting session. The letter contained the following:

Dear Son:

...

Hurrah and vote for Suffrage and don’t keep them in doubt. I noticed Chandlers' speech, it was very bitter. I’ve been watching to see how you stood but have not seen anything yet ... Don't forget to be a good boy and help Mrs. ‘Thomas Catt’ with her "Rats." Is she the one that put rat in ratification, Ha! No more from mama this time.

...

With lots of love, Mama.

The letter

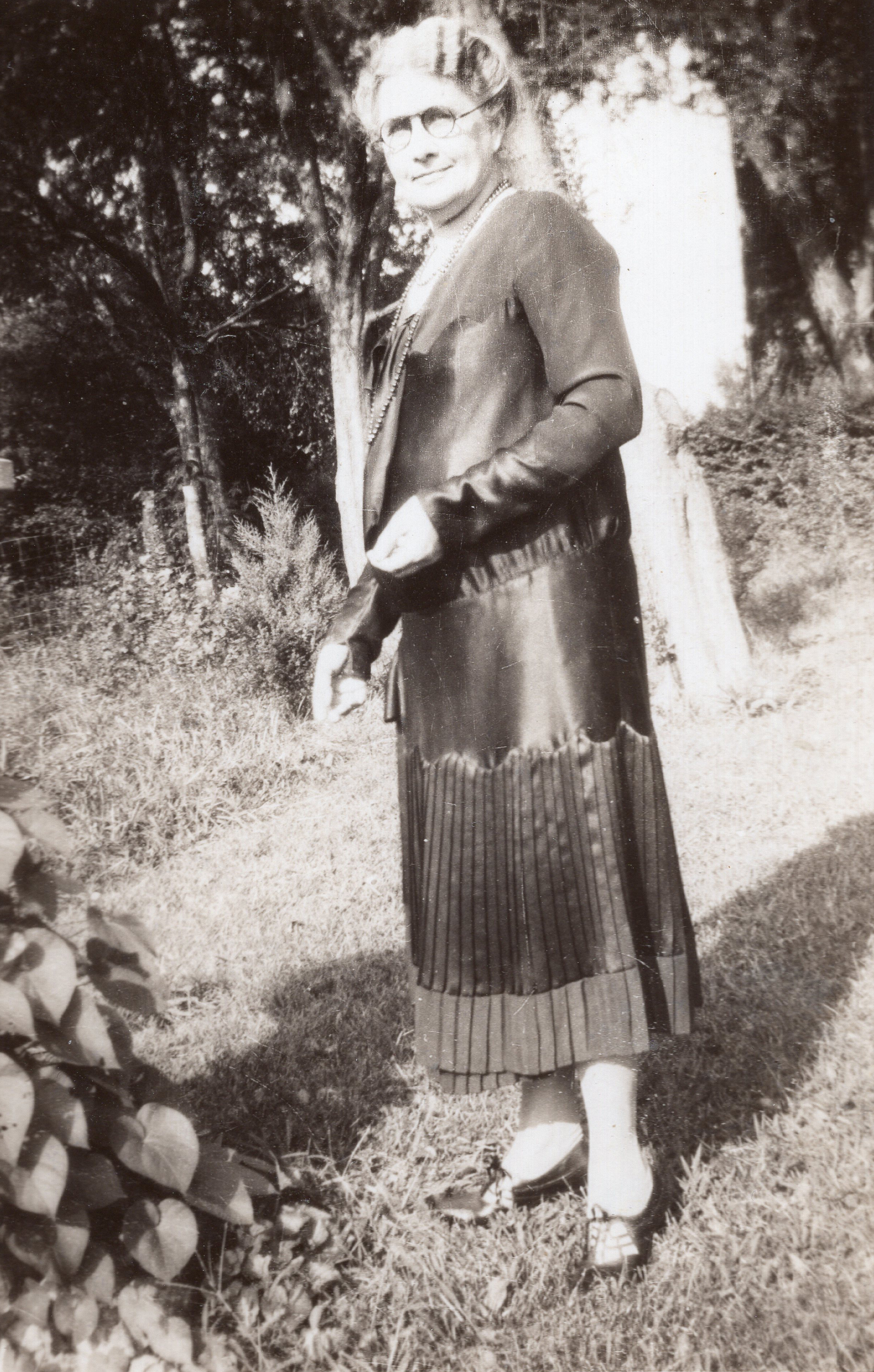
Febb Burn at her Niota farm.

After much debating and argument, the result of the vote was 48-48. Burn voted twice to table the amendment, which would have effectively killed it: however, those votes also tied 48-48. Finally, the house speaker called for a vote on the merits. Burn followed his mother's advice and voted "aye". His vote broke the tie in favor of ratifying the amendment. This led the house speaker to also change his vote to an "aye" in a ploy to be able to repeal the vote later, but this did not work, and the amendment became formally ratified.

As anti-suffragists had been fighting and preparing for this moment over the summer, they became very enraged when they discovered the news of Burn's decision. Contrary to popular belief, Burn was not chased out of the capitol by an angry mob of anti-suffragists. However, the governor worried about Burn's safety and assigned the sergeant-at-arms to guard him. Burn instead left the chamber by climbing out of the window and hiding in the state library's attic.

The next day, Burn was accused of bribery and misconduct for his change in vote. He responded to attacks on his integrity and honor by inserting a personal statement into the House Journal, explaining his decision to cast the vote: suffrage was a right he felt morally obliged to support, especially as it would "free seventeen million women from political slavery", and "I knew that a mother’s advice is always safest for a boy to follow, and my mother wanted me to vote for ratification." This led the wife of a former Louisiana governor to travel to Niota to scold Febb Burn, pushing her to change her son's vote.

A grand jury was called to investigate the accusations of bribery. Burn narrowly won reelection to a second term in the house after a grueling campaign back home in McMinn County.

== Public career ==
Burn held public office for much of his adult life, including positions in the State House of Representatives, 1918–1922; State Senate, 1948–1952; state planning commission, 1952–1970; and as delegate for Roane County to the Tennessee constitutional conventions of 1953, 1959, 1965, and 1971.

Burn ran unsuccessfully for the Republican gubernatorial nomination in 1930.

Burn supported Phyllis Schlafly's campaign to stop the ratification of the Equal Rights Amendment. At one 1974 Stop ERA event, he said the amendment was unnecessary and would cause "a great loss of rights for women."

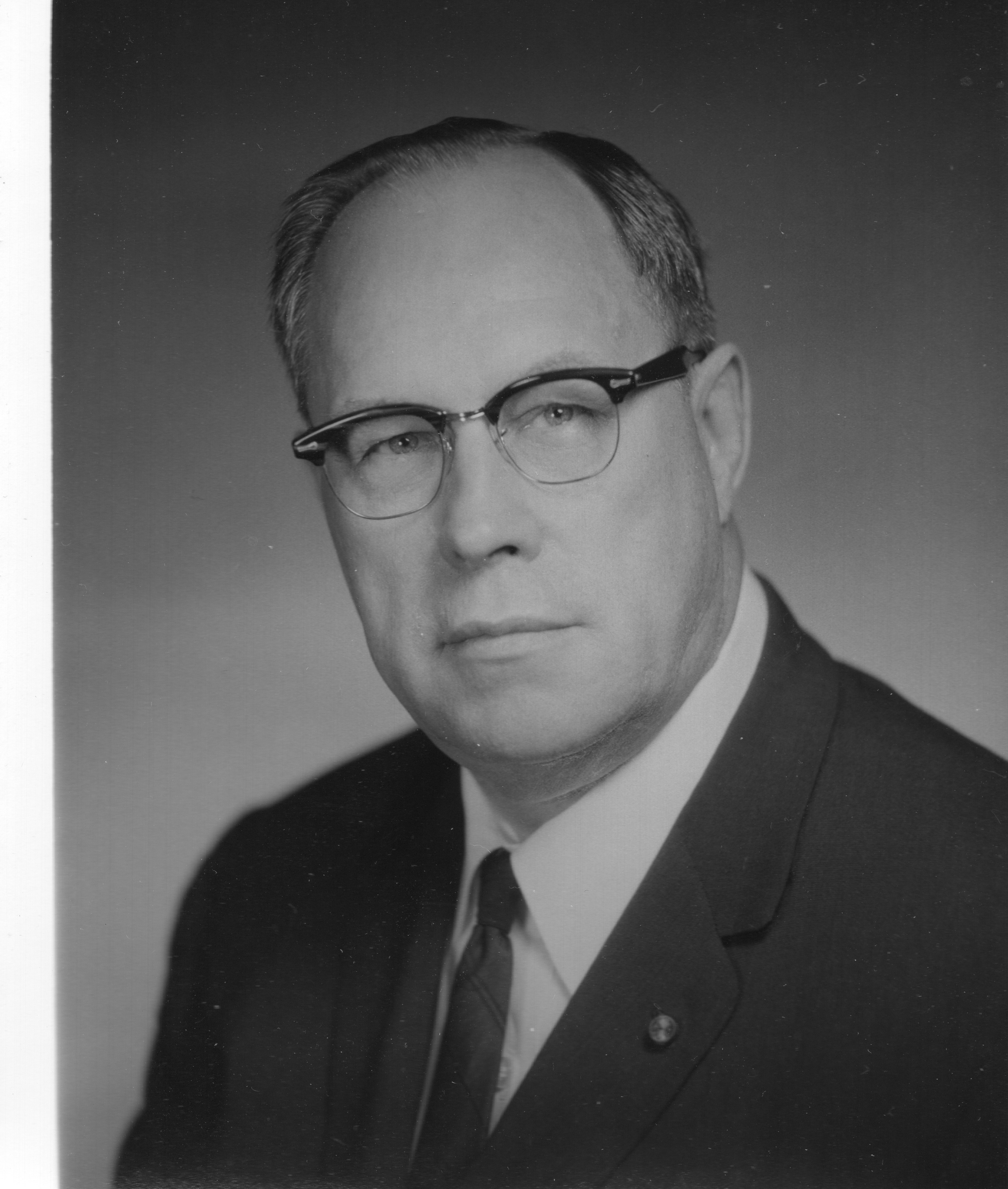
While serving in the state senate and as constitutional convention delegate, Burn advocated for universal suffrage in Tennessee. In the aftermath of election fraud in his district, he helped to draft clean election laws for the state.

== Personal life ==
Burn's mother Febb was the first woman to register to vote in McMinn County on October 9, 1920, on cards that still used all-male pronouns. She cast her first ballot that November.

In 1923, Burn was admitted to the Tennessee Bar and practiced law in Rockwood and Sweetwater. In 1951, he became President of the First National Bank in Rockwood.

Burn was a member of several civic and fraternal organizations, including the National Society Sons of the American Revolution, serving as President-General for the 1964–1965 term.

He was briefly married to Mildred Rebecca Tarwater from 1933 to 1935. He married Ellen Folsom Cottrell (1908–1998) in 1937. The couple had one child, Harry T. Burn Jr. (1937–2016).

Burn died at his home in Niota.

== In popular culture ==
Burn is portrayed by Peter Berinato in the 2004 film Iron Jawed Angels.

Winter Wheat, a musical about the ratification of the 19th Amendment in Tennessee, premiered in 2016 after its original version had a limited run in 2014; Harry Burn, his mother Febb, and his younger brother Jack, are major characters. The play was performed again in 2020.

In 2018, Knoxville, Tennessee unveiled the Burn Memorial Statue depicting Harry and Febb Burn, and the Tennessee legislature unanimously voted to make August 18 "Febb Burn Day."

Burn's great-grandnephew, Tyler L. Boyd, wrote a comprehensive biography of Burn, called Tennessee Statesman Harry T. Burn: Woman suffrage, free elections, and a life of service, and published in 2019.

Burn is portrayed in the 2022 musical Suffs, with the letter he received from his mother being portrayed in a number.

In 2020, woman suffrage murals featuring Burn were unveiled in Niota and Athens. In 2022, the City of Sweetwater commissioned a mural by Jenny Ustick entitled "Hurrah" that honors Burn and his mother, Febb.

== Sources ==
- "Battle began for suffrage many years ago". Nashville Tennessean. Vol. 14, no. 100. 19 August 1920.
- "Suffrage Amendment Adopted by House". Nashville Tennessean. Vol. 14, no. 100. 19 August 1920.
- "Tennessee ratifies amendment giving women of U.S. vote". The Commercial Appeal. Vol. 104, no. 50. 19 August 1920.
- "Decisive action taken today in suffrage battle". The Nashville Tennessean. Vol. 14, no. 102. 21 August 1920.
- "New election laws may be necessary". The Nashville Tennessean. Vol. 14, no. 100. 19 August 1920.
- "The case of Harry T. Burn". The Nashville Tennessean. Vol. 14, no. 102. 21 August 1920.
- "Word from mother won for suffrage". The Nashville Tennessean. Vol. 14, no. 101. 20 August 1920.
- "Burn changed vote on advice of his mother". The Commercial Appeal. 20 August 1920.
- Heirs, Cheryl (8 August 2001). "The nineteenth amendment and the war of the roses". BlueShoe Nashville Guide. Archived from the original on 13 February 2018.
- Boyd, Tyler L. (5 August 2019). Tennessee Statesman Harry T. Burn: Woman suffrage, free elections, and a life of service. Charleston, South Carolina: The History Press. ISBN 978-1-4671-4318-9.
