= Niota, Tennessee =

- City
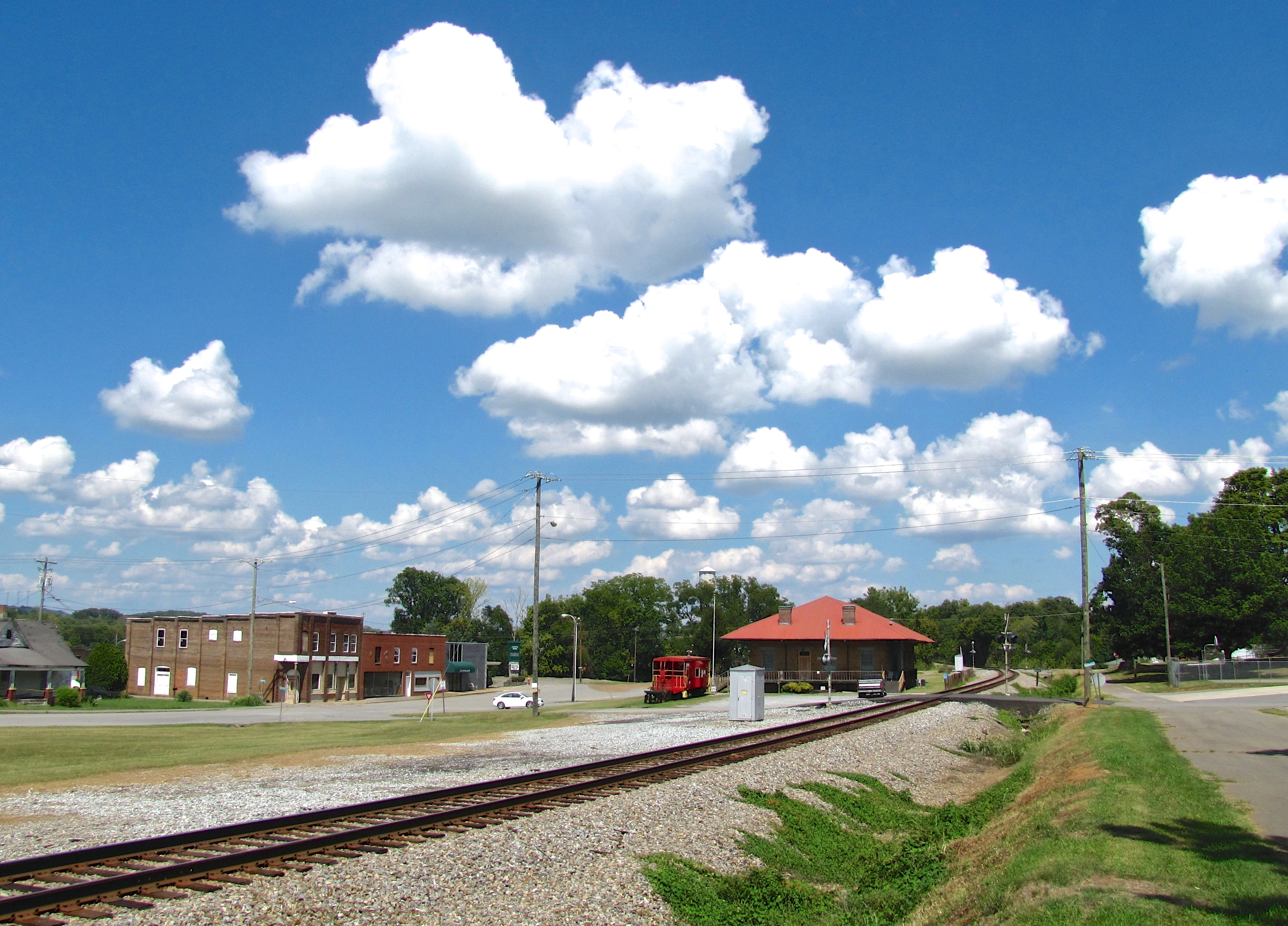
- Niota
- Nickname: socktown
- Location of Niota in McMinn County, Tennessee
- Coordinates: 35°30′51″N 84°32′50″W
- Country: United States
- State: Tennessee
- County: McMinn
- Settled: 1850s
- Incorporated: 1911
- Named for: Ni-o-tah, a fictional Indian chief

Area
  - Total: 2.30 sq mi (5.95 km^{2})
  - Land: 2.30 sq mi (5.95 km^{2})
  - Water: 0 sq mi (0.00 km^{2})
- Elevation: 1,007 ft (307 m)

Population (2020)
  - Total: 772
  - Density: 335.9/sq mi (129.69/km^{2})
- Time zone: UTC-5 (Eastern (EST))
  - Summer (DST): UTC-4 (EDT)
- ZIP code: 37826
- Area code: 423
- FIPS code: 47-53380
- GNIS feature ID: 1648566
- Website: City website

Niota is a city in McMinn County, Tennessee, United States. The population was estimated at 772 in 2020 by the U.S. Census Bureau.

== History ==
The community was originally called "Mouse Creek," but was renamed in 1897 to avoid confusion with a railroad stop in Jefferson City that was named "Mossy Creek." The name "Niota" was based on the name of a fictional character in a dime novel, a Native American chief named "Nee-o-tah."

The Niota Depot, built in 1854 for the East Tennessee and Georgia Railroad, is the oldest standing railroad depot in Tennessee. It currently serves as Niota City Hall.

In 1988, a group of women, later dubbed the “Golden Girls of Niota”, led a successful city council election campaign and became one of the first all-female city councils in the United States and the only one at the time. The group ran as the People’s Choice Party and was led by 78-year old Mayor Effie Lones, the oldest elected female official in the country at the time of her election. Every member of the Golden Girls was a grandmother. 4 of the candidates were elected via write-in votes, and they handed out sample ballots prior to Election Day to familiarize voters with the write-in process.

== Geography ==
Niota is located at 35°30′51″N 84°32′50″W (35.514230, -84.547132). The city is situated along US Route 11 between Sweetwater and Athens. Tennessee State Route 309 connects the city with Interstate 75 to the west.

According to the United States Census Bureau, the city has a total area of 2.0 square miles (5.2 km^{2}), all land.

== Demographics ==
Historical population
Census	Pop.	Note	%±
1920	467		—
1930	443		−5.1%
1940	623		40.6%
1950	956		53.5%
1960	679		−29.0%
1970	629		−7.4%
1980	765		21.6%
1990	745		−2.6%
2000	781		4.8%
2010	719		−7.9%
2020	772		7.4%

=== 2020 census ===
As of the 2020 census, Niota had a population of 772, 345 households, and 255 families residing in the city. The median age was 43.3 years, 19.6% of residents were under the age of 18, and 21.8% of residents were 65 years of age or older. For every 100 females there were 100.5 males, and for every 100 females age 18 and over there were 101.0 males age 18 and over.

There were 345 households in Niota, of which 30.1% had children under the age of 18 living in them. Of all households, 44.3% were married-couple households, 25.2% were households with a male householder and no spouse or partner present, and 26.1% were households with a female householder and no spouse or partner present. About 32.8% of all households were made up of individuals and 17.4% had someone living alone who was 65 years of age or older.

There were 366 housing units, of which 5.7% were vacant. The homeowner vacancy rate was 0.8% and the rental vacancy rate was 2.7%.

59.8% of residents lived in urban areas, while 40.2% lived in rural areas.

Racial composition as of the 2020 census
Race	Number	Percent
White	692	89.6%
Black or African American	8	1.0%
American Indian and Alaska Native	3	0.4%
Asian	16	2.1%
Native Hawaiian and Other Pacific Islander	1	0.1%
Some other race	10	1.3%
Two or more races	42	5.4%
Hispanic or Latino (of any race)	25	3.2%

=== 2000 census ===
As of the census of 2000, there were 781 people, 344 households, and 231 families residing in the city. The population density was 389.0 people per square mile (150.0/km^{2}). There were 382 housing units at an average density of 190.3 per square mile (73.4/km^{2}). The racial makeup of the city was 91.1% White, 2.04% African American, 1.02% Asian, and 2.34% from two or more races. Hispanic or Latino of any race were 3.16% of the population.

There were 344 households, out of which 29.4% had children under the age of 18 living with them, 54.7% were married couples living together, 7.8% had a female householder with no husband present, and 32.6% were non-families. 29.1% of all households were made up of individuals, and 14.2% had someone living alone who was 65 years of age or older. The average household size was 2.27 and the average family size was 2.76 .

In the city, the population was spread out, with 21.9% under age 18, 7.6% from 18 to 24, 28.7% from 25 to 44, 25.6% from 45 to 64, and 16.3% who were 65 years of age or older. The median age was 40 years. For every 100 females, there were 91.4 males. For every 100 females age 18 and over, there were 88.3 males.

The median income for a household in the city was $28,750, and the median income for a family was $36,136. Males had a median income of $30,119 versus $21,964 for females. The per capita income for the city was $15,152. About 8.6% of families and 12.1% of the population were below the poverty line, including 17.9% of those under age 18 and 10.3% of those age 65 or over.

== Education ==
McMinn County Schools operates public schools, including Niota Elementary School.

== Notable people ==
- Harry T. Burn, member of the Tennessee General Assembly, was born in Niota and lived in the community throughout his life. He is best remembered as the state legislator whose vote secured the ratification of the Nineteenth Amendment to the United States Constitution, giving U.S. women the right to vote.
- Febb Burn, Harry Burn's mother remembered for her own crucial role in the ratification of the 19th Amendment
- Alfred Cate, Tennessee state senator and Southern Unionist
