= National Register of Historic Places listings in McMinn County, Tennessee =

Location of McMinn County in Tennessee

This is a list of the National Register of Historic Places listings in McMinn County, Tennessee.

This is intended to be a complete list of the properties and districts on the National Register of Historic Places in McMinn County, Tennessee, United States. Latitude and longitude coordinates are provided for many National Register properties and districts; these locations may be seen together in a map.

There are 18 properties and districts listed on the National Register in the county.

Contents: Counties in Tennessee
Anderson – Bedford – Benton – Bledsoe – Blount – Bradley – Campbell – Cannon – Carroll – Carter – Cheatham – Chester – Claiborne – Clay – Cocke – Coffee – Crockett – Cumberland – Davidson – Decatur – DeKalb – Dickson – Dyer – Fayette – Fentress – Franklin – Gibson – Giles – Grainger – Greene – Grundy – Hamblen – Hamilton – Hancock – Hardeman – Hardin – Hawkins – Haywood – Henderson – Henry – Hickman – Houston – Humphreys – Jackson – Jefferson – Johnson – Knox – Lake – Lauderdale – Lawrence – Lewis – Lincoln – Loudon – Macon – Madison – Marion – Marshall – Maury – McMinn – McNairy – Meigs – Monroe – Montgomery – Moore – Morgan – Obion – Overton – Perry – Pickett – Polk – Putnam – Rhea – Roane – Robertson – Rutherford – Scott – Sequatchie – Sevier – Shelby – Smith – Stewart – Sullivan – Sumner – Tipton – Trousdale – Unicoi – Union – Van Buren – Warren – Washington – Wayne – Weakley – White – Williamson – Wilson

This National Park Service list is complete through NPS recent listings posted August 28, 2026.

== Current listings ==
	Name on the Register	Image	Date listed	Location	City or town	Description
1	Beth Salem Presbyterian Church	Beth Salem Presbyterian Church	June 22, 2000 (#00000728)	State Route 30 at Watson Rd. 35°23′26″N 84°34′09″W	Athens	Congregation founded in 1866; current building constructed in the 1920s
2	Elijah Cate House		March 25, 1982 (#82003993)	West of Niota on State Route 1; 35°30′32″N 84°33′48″W	Niota	
3	James W. Chesnutt House	James W. Chesnutt House	October 4, 2001 (#01001081)	105 A S. Niota Rd. 35°25′31″N 84°29′17″W	Englewood	Maintained by Englewood Textile Museum
4	Samuel Cleage House	Samuel Cleage House	May 12, 1975 (#75002069)	North of Athens on the Lee Highway; 35°29′N 84°35′W	Athens	Not to be confused with Cleage's office in Athens
5	Clear Springs Cumberland Presbyterian Church	Clear Springs Cumberland Presbyterian Church	February 1, 2007 (#06001337)	Clear Springs Rd. 35°16′13″N 84°41′22″W	Calhoun	
6	Englewood Water Tower		March 27, 2020 (#100005141)	East Athens St. 35°25′40″N 84°29′09″W	Englewood	
7	Etowah Carnegie Library	Etowah Carnegie Library	March 23, 2003 (#03000132)	723-725 Ohio Ave. 35°19′26″N 84°31′34″W	Etowah	Currently functions as both a library and city hall
8	Etowah Depot	Etowah Depot	October 17, 1977 (#77001513)	U.S. Route 411; 35°19′24″N 84°31′28″W	Etowah	L&N train depot built in 1906
9	Etowah Historic District		July 25, 1996 (#96000818)	Roughly bounded by 5th St., Washington Ave., 11th St., and Indiana Ave. 35°19′30″N 84°31′49″W	Etowah	
10	First United Presbyterian Church	First United Presbyterian Church	July 24, 2008 (#08000701)	321 N. Jackson St. 35°26′48″N 84°35′47″W	Athens	
11	M.A. Helm House		December 18, 2013 (#13000951)	149 Ralph Layman Rd. 35°23′40″N 84°36′38″W	Riceville	
12	Alexander H. Keith House	Alexander H. Keith House	June 26, 1986 (#86001381)	110 Keith Ln. 35°26′16″N 84°36′54″W	Athens	Built in 1858; now a bed-and-breakfast
13	William Lowry House	William Lowry House	July 19, 1984 (#84003596)	405 E. Madison Ave. 35°26′38″N 84°35′22″W	Athens	
14	McClatchey-Gettys Farm		December 28, 1982 (#82001731)	South of Riceville on State Route 1; 35°19′35″N 84°42′15″W	Riceville	
15	Niota Depot	Niota Depot	April 1, 1975 (#75002105)	Main St. 35°30′54″N 84°32′46″W	Niota	Built in 1854; currently serves as Niota City Hall.
16	Old College	Old College	December 29, 1983 (#83004259)	College St. 35°26′44″N 84°35′36″W	Athens	The original building of Athens Female College, now Tennessee Wesleyan College
17	Trew General Merchandise Store	Trew General Merchandise Store	December 22, 1976 (#76002159)	West of Delano at State Route 163 and Bowater Rd. 35°16′54″N 84°36′28″W	Delano	Operated as a general store from 1890 to 1990
18	Trinity United Methodist Church	Trinity United Methodist Church	July 7, 2009 (#09000537)	100 E. College St. 35°26′41″N 84°35′38″W	Athens	
19	John A. Turley House	John A. Turley House	March 18, 1999 (#99000366)	505 E. Madison St. 35°26′42″N 84°35′17″W	Athens	

== See also ==
- List of National Historic Landmarks in Tennessee
- National Register of Historic Places listings in Tennessee
