= Cumberland Presbyterian Church (disambiguation) =

Cumberland Presbyterian Church may refer to:

- Cumberland Presbyterian Church, the religious denomination

or to specific churches within it, including:

in the United States

(by state then city)

- Cumberland Presbyterian Church (Clarendon, Arkansas), listed on the National Register of Historic Places (NRHP ) in Monroe County
- Mount Olive Cumberland Presbyterian Church, Mount Olive, Arkansas, NRHP-listed
- Caney Springs Cumberland Presbyterian Church, Sage, AR, NRHP-listed
- Cumberland Presbyterian Church (Searcy, Arkansas), NRHP-listed
- Mount Olivet Cumberland Presbyterian Church, Bowling Green, KY, NRHP-listed
- Fredonia Cumberland Presbyterian Church, Fredonia, KY, NRHP-listed
- Greensburg Cumberland Presbyterian Church, Greensburg, KY, NRHP-listed
- Cumberland Presbyterian Church (Peoria, Illinois), NRHP-listed
- Cumberland Presbyterian Church (Lexington, Missouri), NRHP-listed
- New Lebanon Cumberland Presbyterian Church and School, New Lebanon, MO, NRHP-listed
- Cane Ridge Cumberland Presbyterian Church, Antioch, TN, NRHP-listed
- Clear Springs Cumberland Presbyterian Church, Calhoun, TN, NRHP-listed
- Chapel Hill Cumberland Presbyterian Church, Chapel Hill, TN, NRHP-listed
- Charleston Cumberland Presbyterian Church, Charleston, TN, NRHP-listed
- Pleasant Mount Cumberland Presbyterian Church, Columbia, TN, NRHP-listed
- New Bethel Cumberland Presbyterian Church, Greeneville, TN, NRHP-listed
- Cumberland Presbyterian Church of Loudon, Loudon, TN, NRHP-listed
- Manchester Cumberland Presbyterian Church, Manchester, TN, NRHP-listed
- First Cumberland Presbyterian Church-McKenzie, McKenzie, TN, NRHP-listed
- Bear Creek Cumberland Presbyterian Church, Mooresville, TN, NRHP-listed
- Waynesboro Cumberland Presbyterian Church Waynesboro, TN, NRHP-listed
