= Battle of Athens (1946) =

Civilian revolt against corrupt local government in McMinn County, Tennessee

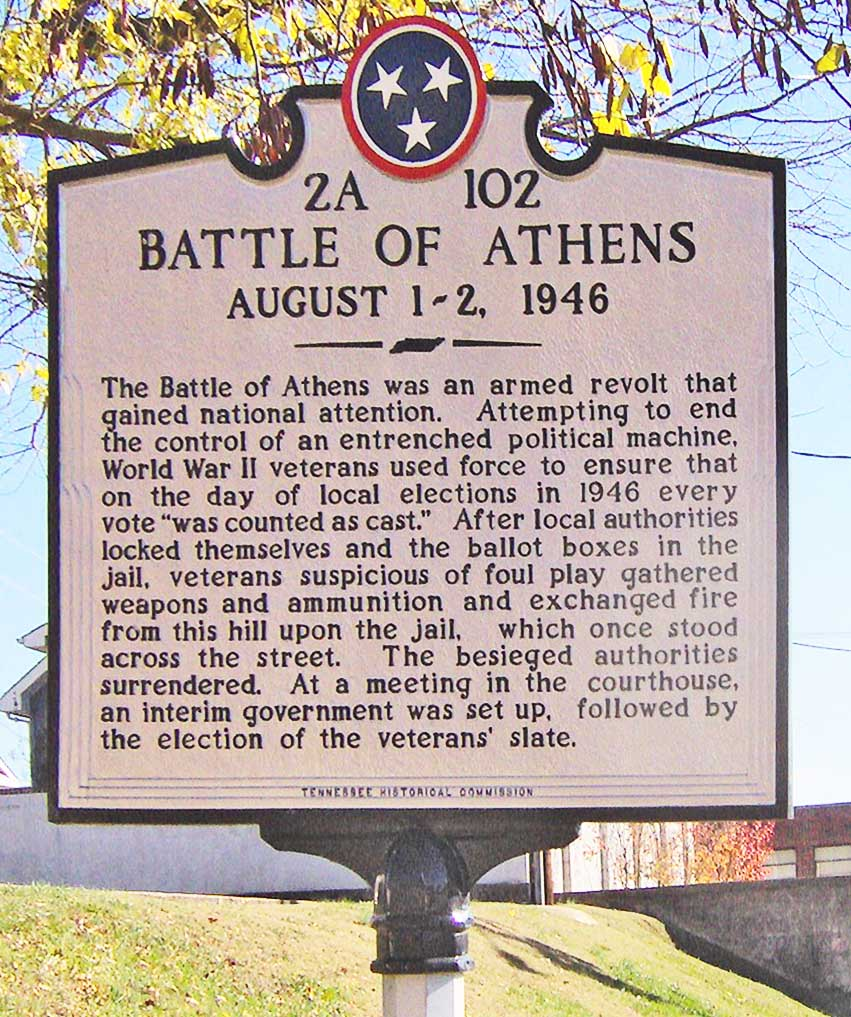
- Tennessee Historical Commission marker at the "Battle of Athens" site
Date	August 1–2, 1946
Location	Athens, Tennessee, United States 35.442°N 84.592°W
Result	Rebellion victory: McMinn County government forced to disband; replaced by new government

Belligerents
Local World War II veterans and other citizens	McMinn County

Commanders and leaders
Bill White; James Buttram; Knox Henry; Frank Charmichael; George Painter; Charles Picket; E. R. Self	Pat Mansfield; Boe Dunn; Paul Cantrell

Strength
50–250	200+ deputies

Casualties and losses
Some injuries, no fatalities	Many injuries, some severe, no fatalities

The Battle of Athens (sometimes called the McMinn County War) was a citizen rebellion in Athens and Etowah, Tennessee, United States, against the corrupt local government, which took place on August 1 and 2, 1946. The citizens, including around 50 to 200 World War II veterans, accused the local officials of predatory policing, police brutality, political corruption, and voter intimidation.

== Background ==
In 1936, the E. H. Crump political machine, based in Memphis, controlled much of Tennessee and its influence extended to McMinn County with the introduction of Paul Cantrell, the Democratic candidate for sheriff. Cantrell, who came from a wealthy and influential family in nearby Etowah, tied his campaign closely to the popularity of the Roosevelt administration. Cantrell won over his Republican opponent in what came to be known as the "vote grab of 1936". Paul Cantrell was re-elected sheriff in the 1938 and 1940 elections, and was elected to the state senate in 1942 and 1944, while his former deputy Pat Mansfield was elected sheriff to take his place. In 1941, a state law reduced political opposition to Crump's officials by decreasing the number of voting precincts from 23 to 12 and reducing the number of justices of the peace from fourteen to seven (including four "Cantrell men"). The sheriff and his deputies were paid under a fee system, whereby they received money for every person they booked, incarcerated, and released. Tourists and travelers were targeted because of this fee system. Buses passing through the county were often pulled over, and passengers were randomly ticketed for drunkenness, regardless of their intoxicated state. Between 1936 and 1946, these fees amounted to almost $300,000 (equivalent to $3,700,000 as of 2024).

Cantrell engaged in electoral fraud, achieved primarily by intimidating voters who voted against him, manipulating the poll tax and allowing ineligible people to vote; it was common for votes from dead voters to be counted also. The U.S. Department of Justice had investigated allegations of electoral fraud in McMinn County in 1940, 1942, and 1944, but without resolution. The political problems were further entrenched by economic corruption of political figures, who enabled gambling, bootlegging, and other illegal activity. Ex-convicts were often appointed as deputies as most of the county's young men were off fighting World War II. These deputies furthered the political machinations, exerting control over the citizens of the county. Control also extended to the newspapers and schools: when asked if the local newspaper, The Daily Post Athenian, supported the GIs, veteran Bill White replied: "No, they didn't help us none." White elaborated: "[Pat] Mansfield had complete control of everything, schools and everything else. You couldn't even get hired as a schoolteacher without their okay, or any other job."

During the war, two servicemen on leave were shot and killed by Cantrell supporters. Servicemen from McMinn County heard of what was going on and were anxious to return home and do something about it. According to a contemporaneous article by Theodore H. White in Harper's Magazine, one veteran, Ralph Duggan, who had served in the Pacific in the Navy and became a leading lawyer postwar, "thought a lot more about McMinn County than he did about the Japs. If democracy was good enough to put on the Germans and the Japs, it was good enough for McMinn County, too!"

When McMinn County's GIs were demobilized and returned home, they were targeted by the deputies. One GI reported: "A lot of boys getting discharged [were] getting the mustering out pay. Well, deputies running around four or five at a time grapping [sic] up every GI they could find and trying to get that money off of them, they were fee grabbers, they wasn't on a salary back then."

In the August 1946 election, Paul Cantrell ran again for sheriff, while Pat Mansfield ran for the State Senate seat. Stephen Byrum, a local historian, speculates that the motive for this switch was an attempt to spread the graft. White, meanwhile, claims the reason for the swap was because they thought Cantrell stood a better chance running against the GIs. The GIs were more hostile towards Sheriff Mansfield and his deputies rather than against Cantrell, whose period as sheriff had been relatively benign.

McMinn County had around 3,000 returning military veterans, almost 10 percent of the county's population. Some of the returning veterans resolved to challenge Cantrell's political control by fielding their own nonpartisan candidates and working for a fraud-free election. A veterans-only meeting was called in May 1946, and a non-partisan slate of candidates was selected. White described the veterans' motivation:

There were several beer joints and honky-tonks around Athens; we were pretty wild; we started having trouble with the law enforcement at that time because they started making a habit of picking up GIs and fining them heavily for most anything—they were kind of making a racket out of it. After long hard years of service—most of us were hard-core veterans of World War II—we were used to drinking our liquor and our beer without being molested. When these things happened, the GIs got madder—the more GIs they arrested, the more they beat up, the madder we got ...

GI Non-Partisan League members were careful to ensure their list of candidates matched the county's electoral demographics, choosing three Republicans and two Democrats. A respected and decorated veteran of the North African campaign, Knox Henry, ran against Cantrell.

Large contributions from local businesspeople well funded the GIs' campaign, although many of McMinn County's citizens believed the election would still be rigged. The veterans capitalized on this belief with the slogan "Your Vote Will Be Counted As Cast".

Well aware of Sheriff Mansfield and his associates' methods, a "fightin' bunch" was organized by White "to keep the thugs from beating up GIs and keep them from taking the election." White created his organization carefully; he later recalled: "I got out and started organizing with a bunch of GIs. Well spirits—I learned that you get the poor boys out of poor families, and the ones that was frontline warriors that's done fighting and didn't care to bust a cap on you. I learned to do that. So that's what I picked. I had thirty men and ... I took what mustering out pay I got and bought pistols. And some of them had pistols. I had thirty men organized". As a part of the election, Sheriff Mansfield hired more than 200 deputies, most from neighboring counties and some from out of state, for $50 a day (equivalent to $826 in 2025).

== Initial confrontations ==
=== Water Works polling place ===
The county election polls opened on August 1, 1946. Normally, there would be about 15 patrolmen on duty for the precincts, but about 200 armed deputies were on patrol for the election, many of them from other counties and states. In Etowah, a GI poll watcher requested that the ballot box be opened and certified as empty. Although he was legally allowed to make the request, he was arrested and taken to jail. In Athens, Walter Ellis protested irregularities in the election and was also arrested and charged with what was explained to him as a "federal offense".

Around 3:00 pm, C.M. "Windy" Wise, a patrolman, prevented an elderly African-American farmer, Tom Gillespie, from casting his ballot at the Athens Water Works polling place. When Gillespie and a GI poll watcher objected, Wise struck Gillespie with brass knuckles, which caused Gillespie to drop his ballot and run from the deputy. Wise then pulled his pistol and shot Gillespie in the back. Gillespie survived the shooting and was taken to jail. Later, Wise was the only person to face charges from the events of August 1–2, 1946. He was sentenced to three years in prison, but only served one year before being paroled.

=== Response ===
GIs gathered in front of L. L. Shaefer's store, which was used as an office by campaign manager Jim Buttram. Buttram had telegraphed Governor McCord in Nashville and U.S. Attorney General Tom Clark, asking for help in ensuring a lawful election, but received no response. When the group learned that Sheriff Mansfield had sent armed guards to all polling places, they convened at the Essankay Garage, where they decided to arm themselves.

Sheriff Mansfield arrived at the Water Works and ordered the poll closed. In the commotion that followed, Wise and Karl Nell, the deputies inside the Water Works, took two poll watchers, Charles Scott and Ed Vestal, captive. By one account, Scott and Vestal jumped through a glass window and fled to the safety of the crowd while Wise followed behind. By another account, there was a guns-drawn confrontation between Buttram, who was accompanied by Scott's father, and Sheriff Mansfield. A third account argues that when Neal Esminger from the Daily Post-Athenian showed up to get a vote count, his arrival was a distraction that allowed Scott and Vestal to break through a door to escape. In any case, the escape was followed by gunfire, which sent the crowd diving for cover.

Someone in the crowd yelled, "Let's go get our guns", causing the crowd to head for the Essankay Garage. Deputy Chief Boe Dunn took the two deputies and the ballot box to the jail. Two other deputies were dispatched to arrest Scott and Vestal. These deputies were disarmed and detained by the GIs, as were a set of reinforcements. Otto Kennedy, GI advisor, Republican Election Commissioner, and Republican Party Chairman, asked White what he was going to do; White said, "I don't know Otto; we might just kill them." According to White, Kennedy grew alarmed and announced, "Oh Lord, oh Lord, oh Lord! No! I'm not having nothing else to do with this. Me and my brother and son-in-law is leaving here." Lones Selber in American Heritage magazine says Kennedy "left, vowing to have no part in murder." The crowd and most GIs left. The remaining GIs took the seven deputies-turned-hostages to a wooded area ten miles from Athens, stripped them, tied them to trees, and beat them.

=== Twelfth precinct polling place ===
At the twelfth precinct, the GI poll watchers were Bob Hairrell and Leslie Doolie. Mansfield man Minus Wilburn commanded the polling place. Wilburn tried to allow a young woman, whom Hairrell believed was underage, to vote. She had no poll tax receipt and was not listed in the voter registration. Hairrell grabbed Wilburn's wrist when he tried to deposit the ballot in the box. Wilburn struck Hairrell on the head with a blackjack and kicked him in the face. Wilburn closed the precinct and took the GIs and ballot box across the street to the jail. Hairrell was brutally beaten and taken to the hospital.

In response to taunts from the deputies and the events of the day, White told his lieutenant, Edsel Underwood, to take five or six men and break into the National Guard Armory to obtain weapons. The GIs took the front door keys from the caretaker and entered the building. They then armed themselves with 70 rifles, two Thompson submachine guns, and ammunition. Lones Selber says White went for the guns himself. White then distributed the rifles and a bandoleer of ammo to each of the 60 GIs.

=== Polls closing ===
As the polls closed and counting began (minus the three boxes taken to the jail), the GI-backed candidates had a three-to-one lead. When the GIs heard the deputies had taken the ballot boxes to the jail, White exclaimed, "Boy, they doing something. I'm glad they done that. Now all we got to do is whip on the jail."

Recognizing that they had broken the law and that Cantrell would likely receive reinforcements in the morning, the GIs felt the need to resolve the situation quickly. The deputies knew little of battle tactics, but the GIs knew them well. By taking up positions on the second floor of a bank across the street, the GIs were able to return fire on the jail from above.

By 9:00 pm, Paul Cantrell, Pat Mansfield, George Woods (Speaker of the State House of Representatives and Secretary of the McMinn County Election Commission), and about 50 deputies were in the jail, allegedly rummaging through the ballot boxes. Woods and Mansfield constituted a majority of the election commission and could therefore certify and validate the count from within the jail.

== Battle ==
Estimates of the number of veterans besieging the jail vary from several hundred to as high as 2,000. White had at least 60 under his command. White split his group, with Buck Landers taking up position at the bank while White took the rest to the post office.

Estimates differ on how the fighting began. Egerton and Williams recall that when the men reached the jail, it was barricaded and manned by 55 deputies. The GIs demanded the ballot boxes but were refused; they then opened fire on the jail, initiating a battle that lasted several hours by some accounts but considerably less by others.

Lones Selber, then seven years old and observing from a nearby street, wrote later in a 1985 American Heritage article: "Opinion differs on exactly how the challenge was issued." White says he was the one to call it out: "Would you damn bastards bring those damn ballot boxes out here or we are going to set siege against the jail and blow it down!" Automatic weapons fire erupted, punctuated by shotgun blasts. "I fired the first shot," White claimed, "then everybody started shooting from our side." A deputy ran for the jail. "I shot him; he wheeled and fell inside of the jail".

In 2000, White claimed he said, "Boys, ... I'm going to tell them to bring the ballot box out of there, and if they don't we're gonna open up on them.' I hollered in there, I said, 'You damn thieve grabbers, bring them damn ballot boxes out of there.' That's just what I said. He didn't make a move down there and finally one of them said, 'By God I heard a bolt click.' Down there—one of them grabbers did, you know—they started scattering around. And I had a pistol in my belt with a shotgun. I had a shotgun and a rifle. And I pulled the pistol out and started firing down there at them. Well, when I did that, all that whole line up there started firing down there in there. A lot of them got in the jail, some of them didn't, some of them got shot laying outside. And the battle started".

Byrum wrote in 1984 that there was a volley of fire that lasted for "several hours", although he gave no exact time for the end of hostilities or an account of the course of the battle. He noted that the deputies surrendered at 3:30 am.

The day after the battle, The New York Times reported a sheriff had been killed, and that the shooting had started with a shot through a jail window and with the GIs demanding the release of the hostages; the deputies refused the release, and the siege ensued. The Times' source was Lowell F. Arterburn, publisher of The Athens Post Athenian. Arterburn reported shots being fired, 2,000 persons milling around, and "at least a score of fist fights were in progress".

White's group thwarted an attempt by deputies outside the jail to reinforce (or take refuge in) the jail. Some people in the jail managed to escape through the back door. One of the escapees was George Woods, who had telephoned Birch Biggs, the boss of next door Polk County, requesting that Biggs send reinforcements to break the siege. Biggs replied, "Do you think I'm crazy?"

The GIs were faced with either winning before morning or going to jail. Rumors spread that the National Guard or state troopers were coming. White made hourly demands for surrender. The GIs attempted to bombard the jail with Molotov cocktails but were not able to throw them far enough to reach the jail. The GIs decided to resort to dynamite. At about that time, an ambulance pulled up to the jail. The GIs assumed it was called to remove the wounded and held their fire. Two men jumped in, and it sped off, carrying Paul Cantrell and Sheriff Mansfield to safety.

The dynamite was then deployed. White said, "We'd put two or three sticks of dynamite together and tape it together and put a cap in there and a fuse. And we'd rear back and throw them. Well, we couldn't get them all the way to the jail, but we got them out to them cars. They'd blow them cars up in the air and turn them over and land them back on the top. Several cars down there were blowing up." That first bomb landed under Bob Dunn's cruiser, flipping it on its back. White knew the GIs had to do better: "I ... said, 'We're going to have to get some charges up there on that jail.' I said, 'Make a couple charges there.... We'll go down there and we'll place some charges.' So I made up a couple charges and I crawled up and put a charge on the jailhouse porch." One charge destroyed Mansfield's car, one landed on the jail porch roof, and one went off against the jail wall. The bombs caused some damage to the jail and scattered debris. American Heritage states, "In the end, the door of the jail was dynamited and breached. The barricaded deputies—some with injuries—surrendered, and the ballot boxes were recovered." The New York Times reported the night was "bloody" and that it ended after the GIs detonated three "home-made demolition charges".

=== End of the battle and vote counting ===
How the fighting ended is also disputed. Byrum reported: "By 3:30 am, the men holding the jail had been dynamited into submission, and by early morning George Woods was calling Ralph Duggan to ask if he could come to Athens and certify the election of the GI slate. White reported that "when the GIs broke into the jail, they found some of the tally sheets marked by the machine had been scored fifteen to one for the Cantrell forces." When the final tally was complete, Knox Henry was declared the winner of the election.

During the fight at the jail, rioting had broken out in Athens, mainly targeting police cars. This continued after the ballot boxes were recovered but subsided by morning. The mob also destroyed the automobiles of the deputies, many bearing out-of-state plates. During the disorder, the Mayor of Athens was on vacation, and the city policemen were "nowhere to be found".

The morning of August 2 found the town quiet. Some minor acts of revenge happened, but the public mood was one of "euphoria that had not been experienced in McMinn County in a long time". Governor McCord initially moved to activate the National Guard, but quickly rescinded the order. The GIs called a meeting in the courthouse to certify the election. The approximately 400 people in attendance elected a special committee to preserve law and order, headed by Methodist minister Bernie Hampton and joined by C. A. Anderson and Gobo Cartwright of the Business Men's Evangelical Committee. George Woods, the escaped Secretary of the County Election Commission, sent a written missive saying: "Next Monday at 10 am I will sign an election certificate certifying that the GI ticket was elected." Later, the veterans turned responsibility for maintaining order in Athens over to Police Chief Herbert Walker. The GIs said they were still "holding control" of McMinn County until September 1, when Knox Henry was to be installed as sheriff.

Sheriff-elect Knox Henry returned to McMinn County after having spent the night in safe keeping in the Sweetwater jail. Sheriff Henry, a 33-year-old former Army Air Force sergeant, observed, "They were going to kill me yesterday, and I had to leave town."

== Nearby conflicts ==
In adjacent Meigs County, a similar conflict broke out. On August 5, the Meigs County Election Commission certified Republican Oscar Womac as sheriff. Womac admitted to a reporter that he had ordered some associates to burn "a bunch of ballots". The ballots, he claimed, were found in the Meigs County Courthouse the previous day. The Chattanooga Times reported that Sheriff J. T. Pettit claimed the Peakland ballot box was taken at gunpoint by Womac and companions from the County Clerk's office the day before the ballot burning. "There was little we could do to stop him; he was armed, and the four men with him were armed", Sheriff Pettit said. In Monroe County, east of McMinn County and north of Polk County, 65-year-old county sheriff Jake Tipton was shot and killed during a dispute at the Vale precinct.

== Aftermath ==
The recovered ballots certified the election of the five GI Non-Partisan League candidates. Among the reforms instituted were a change in the method of payment and a $5,000 salary cap for officials. Gambling houses colluding with the Cantrell regime were raided and their operations demolished. Deputies of the prior administration resigned and were replaced.

The ballots, when tallied, proved a landslide for the GI Non-Partisan League. George Woods, Speaker of the state House of Representatives and secretary of the McMinn County election commissioners, was marched into the County Courthouse under the guard of ex-GIs; Woods had fled after the gun battle. League member Knox Henry received 2,175 votes against 1,270 for Sheriff Cantrell. The League also won the other races: Frank Carmichael won as trustee 2,194 to 1,270; George Painter won the county clerk race 2,175 to 1,198; the circuit court clerk broke 2,165 to 1,197 for Charles Picket.

White was made a sheriff's deputy. "They put me in as a deputy. Because, one of the reasons they put me in as deputies was to scare them GIs. (Laughs) They wanted me to control the GIs. Which they did—they fired into them people's houses and everything else. And that was my job to get out there and keep the GIs straight. And I did. I had sixteen fights in one weekend. Fighting GIs, keeping them from shooting them people's houses and beating up people. My fists got so sore I couldn't stick them in my pocket ... If you fight them with your fists, they had respect for you. But you didn't use blackjacks or guns on them. If you did they'd gang up on you and kill you."

In early September, the fall of the county's political machine was followed by the resignation of Athens' Mayor, Paul Walker, and the town's four alderpersons; the resignations came after a nighttime shotgun blast through the front of Alderman Hugh Riggs' home, and were met with popular approval. The McMinn County Veterans of Foreign Wars and American Legion posts had called for Mayor Walker to resign immediately after the gunfight.

The "Battle of Athens" was followed by veteran movements in other Tennessee counties to promote a statewide coalition against corrupt political machines in the upcoming November elections. Governor McCord countered an attempt to form a "Non-Partisan GI Political League" by directing the Young Democrats Clubs of Tennessee to recruit ex-GIs. The "Crump Organization", based in Shelby County, also worked against the nascent GI organization. A convention was held in Alamo, Tennessee, with the intention of establishing a new national party; the convention was discouraged by General Evans Carlson, USMC, who argued that the GIs should work through the existing political parties.

The new GI government of Athens quickly encountered challenges, including the re-emergence of old party loyalties. On January 4, 1947, four of the five leaders of the GI Non-Partisan League declared in an open letter: "We abolished one machine only to replace it with another and more powerful one in the making." The GI government in Athens eventually collapsed, the movement quickly faded, and politics in the state returned to normal. The Non-Partisan GI Political League replied to enquiries by veterans elsewhere in the United States with the advice that political violence was not the appropriate method of resolving political differences.

== Legacy ==
Joseph C. Goulden in The Best Years 1945–1950 discussed the Battle of Athens, how it sparked ex-GI political movements in three other Tennessee counties, as well as other boss-ruled Southern states, led to a convention with representatives from several Southern states, and how it raised fears that veterans would resort to further violence. The battle came when there was concern that returning GIs would be dangerously violent. Those concerns were addressed in an opinion piece by Warden Lawes, the author of Twenty Thousand Years at Sing Sing, in a New York Times opinion piece.

Eleanor Roosevelt expressed a somewhat popular opinion that GIs should be checked for violent tendencies before they were demobilized; White came to see her point. One of the reasons the GI League collapsed was the continuing GI-related violence in McMinn County.

The conflict initially received criticism in the press. Coverage, however, quickly faded, and after Alan J. Gould, an executive with the Associated Press, told the Conference of State Directors of the Veterans Administration that the AP would try to suppress the use of the word "veteran" in conjunction with crime stories, the story of GI violence began to disappear.
