= Paul Cantrell =

Tennessee politician (1895–1962)

Malcolm Paul Cantrell (August 28, 1895 – July 8, 1962) was a Democratic Tennessee politician and state senator. He was known for his political "machine" centered in McMinn County, Tennessee.

== Biography ==
Cantrell was born on August 28, 1895, in a small southeastern McMinn County, Tennessee, community that later became Etowah, Tennessee, in 1909. A descendant of Revolutionary War veteran Thomas Cantrell, he came from a large family. After serving as a conductor for the Louisville and Nashville Railroad, he managed the Etowah Water, Light, and Power Company. Along with his siblings, he owned and operated a lumber company, a natural gas company, a motor company, and a bank. He also served as a director for Citizen's National Bank in nearby Athens, Tennessee.

Active in the local Democratic Party, Cantrell was elected Sheriff of McMinn County in 1936. He was re-elected in 1938 and 1940. With his local support he built a centered political machine. He was elected to the Tennessee Senate representing McMinn County's district in 1942 and re-elected in 1944. He also served as county judge from 1942–1946. A powerful and influential figure, he served as a delegate to the Democratic National Convention in 1944.

His political power was broken in 1946 in the "Battle of Athens", a rebellion led by war veterans. After the battle, he remained in McMinn County and worked for the Tennessee Natural Gas Company. Cantrell died on July 8, 1962, at the age of 66 in a hospital in Athens, Tennessee.
