= Etowah High School =

Etowah High School may refer to:

- Etowah High School (Georgia), United States
- Etowah High School (Alabama), United States
- Etowah High School (Tennessee), United States
