= Regret (disambiguation) =

Regret is a negative conscious and emotional reaction to personal past acts and behaviors.

Regret or Regrets may also refer to:

== Music ==
- "Regret" (New Order song), 1993
- "Regret" (LeToya Luckett song), 2009
- "Regret" (Mai Hoshimura song), 2008
- "Regret" (The Gazette song), 2006
- "Regret" (Everything Everything song), 2015
- "Regrets" (Mylène Farmer and Jean-Louis Murat song), 1991
- "Regrets" (James Brown song), 1980
- Regret, an album by Japanese music production unit I've Sound
- Regrets, an EP by Cesium137
- "Regret", a song from Fiona Apple's album The Idler Wheel...
- "Regret", a song from St. Vincent's self-titled album
- “Regret”, a song by Ayesha Erotica
- "Regrets", a song from Jay-Z's debut album Reasonable Doubt
- "Regrets", a song from Ben Folds Five's album The Unauthorized Biography of Reinhold Messner
- "Regrets", a song from the Eurythmics' album Touch
- "Regrets", a song from Reks' album Straight, No Chaser

== Other uses ==
- Regret, Tennessee, a former unincorporated community in the United States
- Regret (Halo), one of the Prophets from the game of Halo 2
- Regret (decision theory), the ratio or difference between the actual payoff and the best one
- Regret (horse) (1912–1934), a champion racehorse
- Regret Stakes, an American Throughbred horse race
- Regret (1814 ship)
- Regret (film), an Indonesian family film by Sophan Sophiaan
