= Athens City Schools (Tennessee) =

Public school district in Athens, Tennessee, United States

Location
- Athens, McMinn County, Tennessee; United States

District information
- Grades: PreK–8

Athens City School System or Athens City Schools (ACS) is a school district headquartered in Athens, Tennessee. The district serves grades Pre-Kindergarten through 8, with McMinn County Schools serving Athens residents for grades 9–12. The latter operates McMinn County High School in Athens.

== History ==
In 1946 there was a controversy when protests broke out as a result of the board of education choosing not to retain seven members of the teaching staff. Ultimately the entire school board resigned and a new board was elected that September.

In 2010 Robert Greene began his term as the school district's director. He stepped down in 2015, when Melanie Miller took the position. In early 2020 Miller decided not to continue in her position. In 2020 Greene again became the director of the district.

Previously the district had a requirement that students wear masks during the COVID-19 pandemic in Tennessee, but in November 2021 this ended.

== Schools ==
There is one middle school, Athens City Middle School.

Elementary schools

- City Park School
- Ingleside School
- North City School
- Westside School
