= Claxton, Tennessee =

Claxton, Tennessee may refer to one of two locations:

- Claxton, Anderson County, Tennessee
- Claxton, McMinn County, Tennessee
