= Etowah City Elementary School District =

School district in Tennessee, United States

Etowah City Elementary School District is a school district of Etowah, Tennessee. It operates a single K-8 school, Etowah Elementary School a.k.a. Etowah City School (ECS).

High school students move on to McMinn County Schools. McMinn Central High School is the successor of the former Etowah High School.

== History ==
A high school was built in 1922, but it later became a junior high school.

Kenneth Green served as principal of the junior high school until 1961, when Andrew Harbison replaced him. Max Ellis served as superintendent until 1962, when he resigned.

In 1973 there were about 200 students in the middle school grades, 5-8. That year the current K-8 school was constructed. Originally the new school facility was supposed to open around Christmas of that year. A fire destroyed most of the gymnasium and all other portions of the former junior high school in September. The school system planned to open the new school building before it had intended to.

In 1999 it underwent a full-scale renovation.

Mike Frazier began his post as director of schools (superintendent) in 2012. The board renewed his role in 2019.

The Tennessee Valley Authority, in 2022, gave the school district a $400,000 grant for its school School Uplift program, could have more cost-efficient power usage.
