= Conasauga, Tennessee =

Conasauga, Tennessee may refer to the following places in Tennessee:

- Conasauga, McMinn County, Tennessee, an unincorporated community
- Conasauga, Polk County, Tennessee, an unincorporated community
