= Trinity United Methodist Church (Athens, Tennessee) =

Historic church in Tennessee, United States

- U.S. National Register of Historic Places
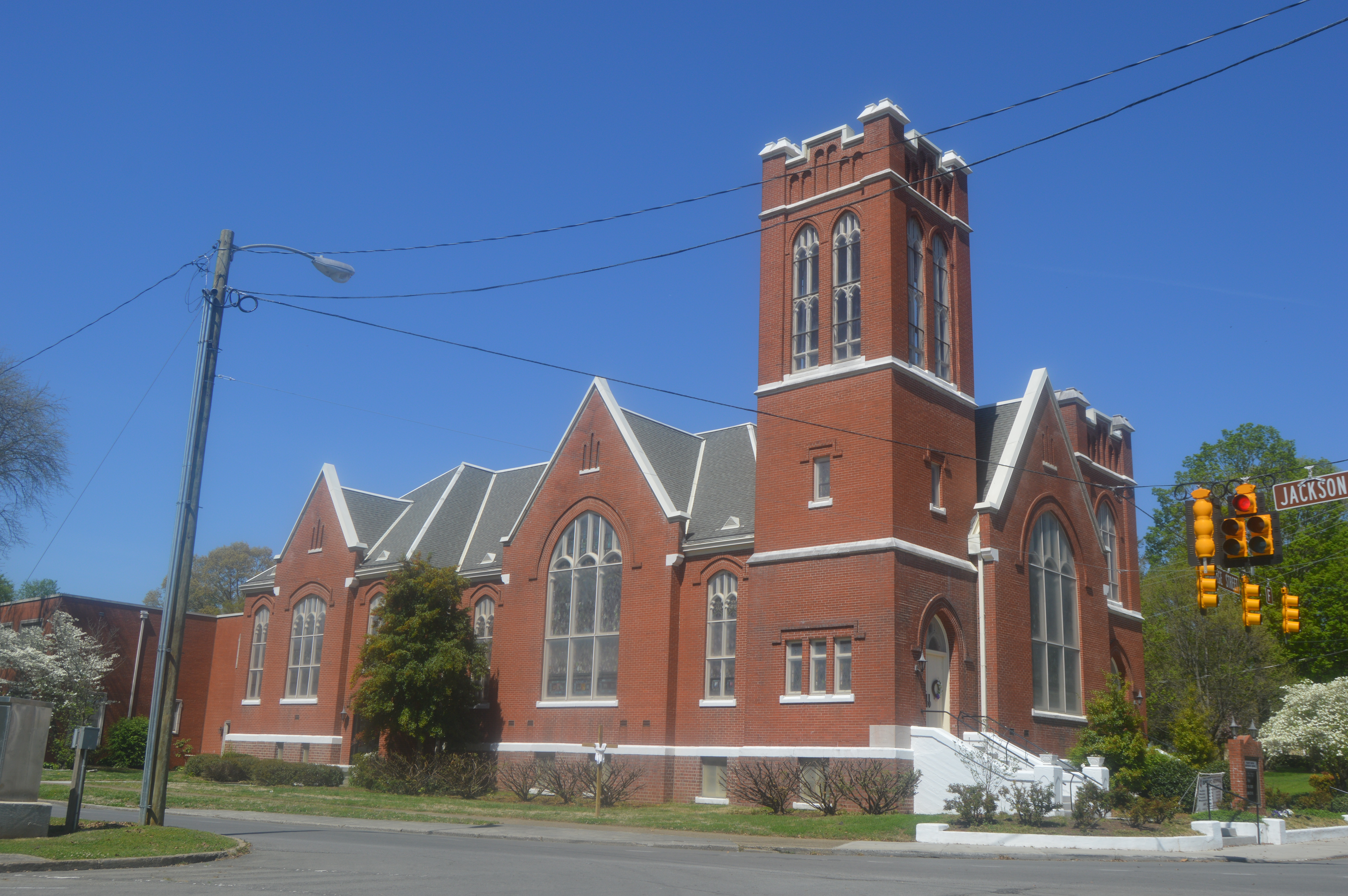
- Western side and front

- Location within Tennessee Location within the United States
- Location: 100 E. College St., Athens, Tennessee
- Coordinates: 35°26′48″N 84°35′38″W
- Area: less than one acre
- Built: 1910
- Architect: Sidney Badgley et al.
- Architectural style: Gothic Revival
- NRHP reference No.: 09000537
- Added to NRHP: July 7, 2009

Trinity United Methodist Church is a historic Methodist church in Athens, McMinn County, Tennessee.

The congregation was founded in 1824-5 as the Methodist Episcopal Church of Athens. Its first meeting house was a structure of hewn logs built by slaves. It stood at the southwest corner of West Washington and Church Streets in Athens. It was eventually replaced by a brick building. When the Civil War resulted in a split within the Methodist Episcopal denomination, the congregation affiliated with the Methodist Episcopal Church, South. After the 1939 merger between that denomination and the Methodist Episcopal Church and the Methodist Protestant Church, the church became known as Trinity Methodist Church. It became a United Methodist church in 1968, when the Methodist Church and the Evangelical United Brethren Church combined to form that denomination.

The present church building was completed in 1910 at a cost of $32,449.28; its education wing was added in 1926. The Gothic Revival architectural design of the 1910 church was provided by Badgley and Nicklas, a Cleveland, Ohio, architecture firm. The building design features two towers, stained glass windows with stone tracery, an octagonal dome ceiling, and eight columns to represent the eight people who survived Noah's flood. It has an Akron floor plan, which allows the sanctuary to be expanded to accommodate large events.

In 2009, the church building was listed on the National Register of Historic Places.
