= Leon Daniel =

American journalist

- Born: August 8, 1931; Etowah, Tennessee, U.S.
- Died: March 19, 2006 (aged 74); Glen Ellyn, Illinois, U.S.
- Education: University of Tennessee
- Occupations: National Correspondent, and Managing Editor for International News for UPI
- Years active: 1956–97
- Partner: Judith Paterson
- Children: 1

Leon Daniel (August 8, 1931 – March 19, 2006) was a reporter, manager, and senior editor of United Press International (UPI). He was considered to be the "gold standard" in wire service reporting.

Daniel is most well known for his reporting during the Vietnam War where he remained while many foreign correspondents fled the country, as well as for his coverage of the Civil Rights Movement during the 1960s. Daniel wrote one of his more notable pieces, published on June 12, 1977, on the escape from prison of James Earl Ray, the assassin of Martin Luther King Jr.

== Early career and UPI ==
At age 19, Daniel enlisted in the Marines and became a rifle squad leader during the Korean War. He was awarded the Purple Heart following shrapnel wounds to his ankle. After returning from service in the Korean War, Daniel attended the University of Tennessee, and shortly after, began his career in journalism by joining the Knoxville Journal.

In 1956, Daniel became a reporter for United Press International in their Nashville office and was promoted to manager in their Knoxville branch in 1959. He later was promoted to report at UPI's southern headquarters in Atlanta in 1960.

== Civil Rights Movement ==
Daniel began reporting on the civil rights movement between 1960 and 1966 during his placement in UPI's headquarters in Atlanta. Colleagues noted that his coverage of the civil rights movement was "the story he considered the most important he ever reported." His coverage included stories from Florida, Alabama and Mississippi, among others. Daniel was responsible for coverage of the events related to desegregation occurring in the southern U.S., such as "The Battle of Ole Miss" where riots broke out at the University of Mississippi in protest of the enrollment of the black student, James Meredith. He also covered the Selma to Montgomery marches led by Martin Luther King Jr. in 1965 in protest of the recent, violent incident known as "Bloody Sunday". Daniel did cover civil rights-related events in Philadelphia, Mississippi, however, where he reported on the murders of Chaney, Goodman, and Schwerner. He commented that the populace at the time was "a very dangerous town for any outsiders, not just civil rights workers."

One of Daniel's more notable pieces, published on June 12, 1977, reported the escape of James Earl Ray, the assassin of Martin Luther King Jr., from Tennessee's Brushy Mountain State Penitentiary.

== Vietnam War ==
Daniel began reporting on the Vietnam War in 1966. He remained in Saigon as South Vietnam fell, being one of the few foreign correspondents to do so. When asked about why he chose to stay, he jokingly said, "I had to. The AP correspondent was there." He reported on the lack of military presence within South Vietnam during northern advances into the country, on major battles occurring within South Vietnam with joint U.S. forces, and the threat of invading Laos. He also reported directly to Vietnamese military officials, such as General Le Minh Dao regarding the threat of North Vietnamese forces occupying Xuan Loc.

He is known for writing the UPI headline, "Saigon government surrenders," when the capital, Saigon, was occupied by Northern Vietnamese forces. He was known for taking part in UPI antics in Vietnam as he was accused of stealing a statue in a Saigon bar, having been referred to local Vietnamese civilian police for the offense. He was expelled from Vietnam by the new Communist rulers, and was later expelled from Thailand and declared persona non grata for writing articles detrimental to the Thai government, possibly violating Thai military secrecy, although this was denied by both UPI and Daniel. UPI protested against the expulsion of Daniel from Vietnam, noting that "Daniel's accuracy and dedication to the journalistic profession is outstanding and we have every confidence in him as a representative of UPI."

== Later career ==
In 1980, after extensive press work in the U.S., Vietnam, and the Dominican Republic, Daniel moved to Washington, D.C., to become UPI's national correspondent and later, the managing editor for international news. He retired in 1997, but continued to write op-ed pieces, such as one about preemptive U.S. invasion of Iraq following the September 11 attacks.

== Death and legacy ==
Daniel died from complications of angioplasty, and was survived by his partner Judith Paterson, his daughter author Rev. Dr. Lillian Daniel, and two grandchildren, Calvin Weeks and Ab Weeks. Daniel was referred to as a "veteran correspondent" and "the gold standard" among wire service reporters by colleagues and "a tough competitor ... and also was the most amiable of men, endearing him to colleagues and soldiers alike," by one reporter from rival news organization, Associated Press.

In 2006, the University of Maryland's College of Journalism created the Judith Paterson/Leon Daniel Journalism Scholarship as a tribute to "long-time companion Leon Daniel, a legendary journalist and war correspondent of his era, and former United Press International Bureau Chief in London." Judith Paterson was Daniel's companion and has since retired from her position at the university as a journalism professor.

Leon Daniel's daughter is the Rev. Dr. Lillian Daniel, pastor of First Congregational Church in Dubuque, Iowa and author of four books including Tired of Apologizing for a Church I Don't Belong To (Faith Words, 2016) and When Spiritual But Not Religious Is Not Enough (Jericho, 2013.)
