= Al Clayton =

American photographer (1934–2014)

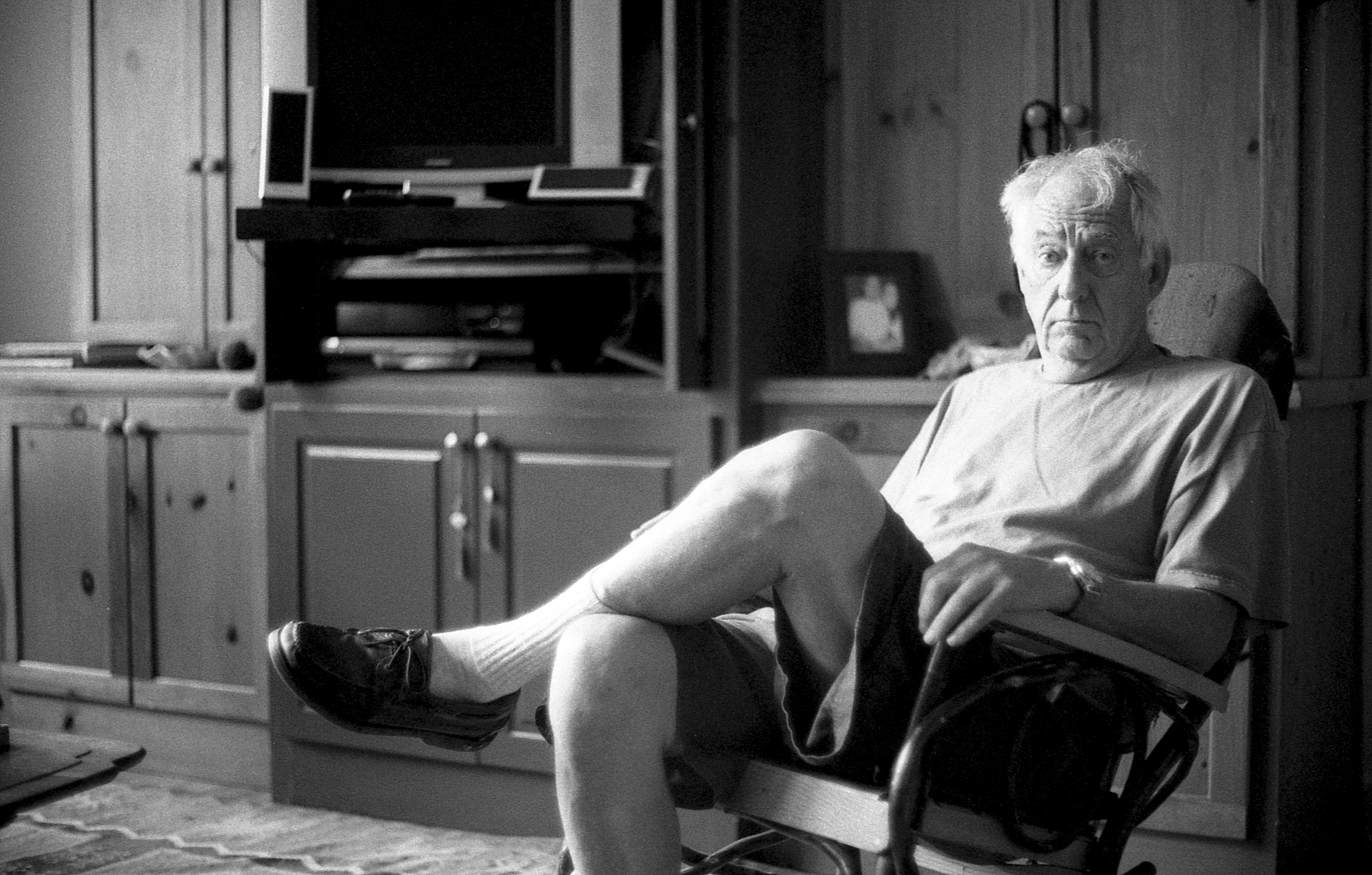
Clayton in his home in Jasper, Georgia. Taken by Abby Nardo.

Charles Allen Clayton III (June 14, 1934 – April 27, 2014) was an American photographer born in Etowah, Tennessee. His 1967 photography series was instrumental in the redesign and expansion of the Food Stamp Program when Senators Edward Kennedy and Joseph Clark used the images in hearings on hunger and malnutrition in the United States. The photographs were later published in the 1969 book Still Hungry in America with text by Robert Coles and a foreword by Kennedy. The book was republished in March 2018 by the University of Georgia Press in partnership with the Southern Foodways Alliance.

One of the most famous photos in country music history was taken on Guy Clark's porch in 1972 of Clark, wife Susanna Clark, Townes Van Zandt, and Daniel Antopolsky by Clayton. In 1978, he contributed photography to The Hog Book by William Hedgepeth.

== Early life ==
Clayton was born in 1934 in Etowah, Tennessee and moved to Copperhill, Tennessee in 1939. He graduated from Copperhill High School in 1952 where he was the salutatorian in a class of about 15. In 1952, he joined U.S. Navy and became Hospital Corpsman and medical photographer. He was discharged from the Navy in 1958 and entered Art Center School in Los Angeles.
