= Spring Creek, McMinn County, Tennessee =

Spring Creek, Tennessee
- Unincorporated community
- Location within Tennessee Location within the United States
- Coordinates: 35°25′04″N 84°43′31″W
- Country: United States
- State: Tennessee
- County: McMinn
- Elevation: 810 ft (250 m)
- Time zone: UTC-5 (Eastern (EST))
  - Summer (DST): UTC-4 (EDT)
- Area code: 423
- GNIS feature ID: 1314322

Spring Creek is an unincorporated community in McMinn County, Tennessee, United States. Spring Creek is 7.7 miles (12.4 km) west-southwest of Athens.
