= Etowah High School (Tennessee) =

Defunct school in Tennessee, United States

- Etowah, McMinn County, Tennessee; United States

Information
- School type: High school
- Established: 1925
- Closed: 1966
- School district: McMinn County Schools
- NCES District ID: 4702820
- Enrollment: 448 (1958)

Etowah High School was a public high school in Etowah, Tennessee. It was a part of McMinn County Schools.

== History ==
It was built in 1925 and had two stories.

Circa 1951, when Kenneth Barker began his term as a principal, there were 320 students.

There were 416 students enrolled during the 1955–1956 school year.

By 1958, enrollment was up to 448. That year, several students walked out of the building in protest of what they described as the "deplorable" and "crowded" conditions of the building. This walkout lasted for at least four days.

The school consolidated into McMinn Central High School in 1966. The McMinn County School District set up an auction for the Etowah High land, with the Etowah city government being one of the bidders.

== See also ==
- Etowah City School
