= The Hog Book =

1978 book by William Hedgepeth

- Author: William Hedgepeth
- Illustrator: John Findley
- Subject: Pigs
- Publisher: Doubleday
- Publication date: 1978
- Pages: 272
- ISBN: 9780385116664

The Hog Book is a 1978 book written by William Hedgepeth with illustration by John Findley and photography by Al Clayton. It was published in 1978 by Doubleday and republished in 1998 and 2008 by University of Georgia Press. The book covers the historical relationship between humanity and pigs through a variety of lenses, such as mythology, poetry and art.

== Reception ==
In 1978, Phoebe-Lou Adams, in her review for The Atlantic, wrote: "only a confirmed pig-hater could resist this odd, pretty (yes, pretty) book." Peter Shahrokh, writing for Agricultural History, claims: "Hedgepeth's basic message is that we limit ourselves terribly when we believe in the formula "pig equals pork"; the hog can be much more as Hedgepeth happily shows through his lively and sometimes purposely ornate accounts and thoughts about life in a hoglot, hog lovemaking, the hog in myth, and so on." In Society and Animals, Arran Stibbe writes: ”Hedgepeth first challenges dominant discourses through parody and irony (rather than intimations of falsehood) and then supplies new ways of thinking about pigs through the application of new discursive constructions."
