= Reagan, McMinn County, Tennessee =

Reagan, Tennessee
- Unincorporated community
- Location within Tennessee Location within the United States
- Coordinates: 35°33′05″N 84°30′51″W
- Country: United States
- State: Tennessee
- County: McMinn
- Elevation: 965 ft (294 m)
- Time zone: UTC-5 (Eastern (EST))
  - Summer (DST): UTC-4 (EDT)
- Area code: 423
- GNIS feature ID: 1299016

Reagan is an unincorporated community in McMinn County, Tennessee, United States.

The community was historically known as Reagan Station, a name derived from early settler and civic leader James Hayes Reagan.

== History ==
The area now known as Reagan was originally called Facility, the name of its early post office. According to the 1913 work A History of Tennessee and Tennesseans, James Hayes Reagan moved to McMinn County as a young man and settled at the location that would become Reagan Station. He served as postmaster at Facility for more than forty years, operated the local store, and taught the first school in the vicinity.

Reagan became one of the most prominent landowners in McMinn County, eventually holding approximately 1,600 acres locally and additional lands in Arkansas. He also played a significant role in regional transportation development, helping secure the charter for the East Tennessee and Georgia Railroad and personally financing part of its early construction.

The surrounding settlement became known as Reagan Station during his lifetime. The name was later shortened to Reagan, which continues to identify the community today.

== Geography ==
The U.S. Geological Survey’s Geographic Names Information System (GNIS) lists Reagan as a populated place with feature ID 1299016.

== Landmarks ==
A small cemetery known as Reagan Station Church Cemetery preserves the historical name of the community. The cemetery contains burials associated with early residents of the area.

== Notable people ==
- James Hayes Reagan (1800–1865), pioneer settler, merchant, educator, postmaster, state senator, and early railroad advocate.
- Julia Reagan Love, daughter of James Hayes Reagan and wife of Col. James Robert Love of Sweetwater, Tennessee.
