= Liberty Hill, McMinn County, Tennessee =

Liberty Hill, Tennessee
- Unincorporated community
- Location within Tennessee Location within the United States
- Coordinates: 35°22′56″N 84°26′15″W
- Country: United States
- State: Tennessee
- County: McMinn
- Elevation: 896 ft (273 m)
- Time zone: UTC-5 (Eastern (EST))
  - Summer (DST): UTC-4 (EDT)
- Area code: 423
- GNIS feature ID: 1315392

Liberty Hill is an unincorporated community in McMinn County, Tennessee, United States. Liberty Hill is located on Tennessee State Route 39 4 miles (6.4 km) southeast of Englewood.
