= Steel Arm Dickey =

American baseball player

- Pitcher
- Born: June 2, 1896; Morganton, Georgia, U.S.
- Died: March 11, 1923 (aged 26); Etowah, Tennessee, U.S.
- Batted: Left Threw: Left

debut
- 1922, for the St. Louis Stars

Last appearance
- 1922, for the St. Louis Stars

Career statistics
- Win–loss record: 2–2
- Earned run average: 6.39
- Strikeouts: 19
- Stats at Baseball Reference

Teams
- St. Louis Stars (1922)

Walter Claude "Steel Arm" Dickey (June 2, 1896 – March 11, 1923) was an American Negro leagues pitcher for the first Negro Southern League and Negro National League.

Dickey had a short career, dying at the age of 26 in Etowah, Tennessee.

Dickey was buried in the New Zion Cemetery in Etowah, Tennessee.
