= Beth Salem Presbyterian Church =

Historic church in Tennessee, United States

- U.S. National Register of Historic Places
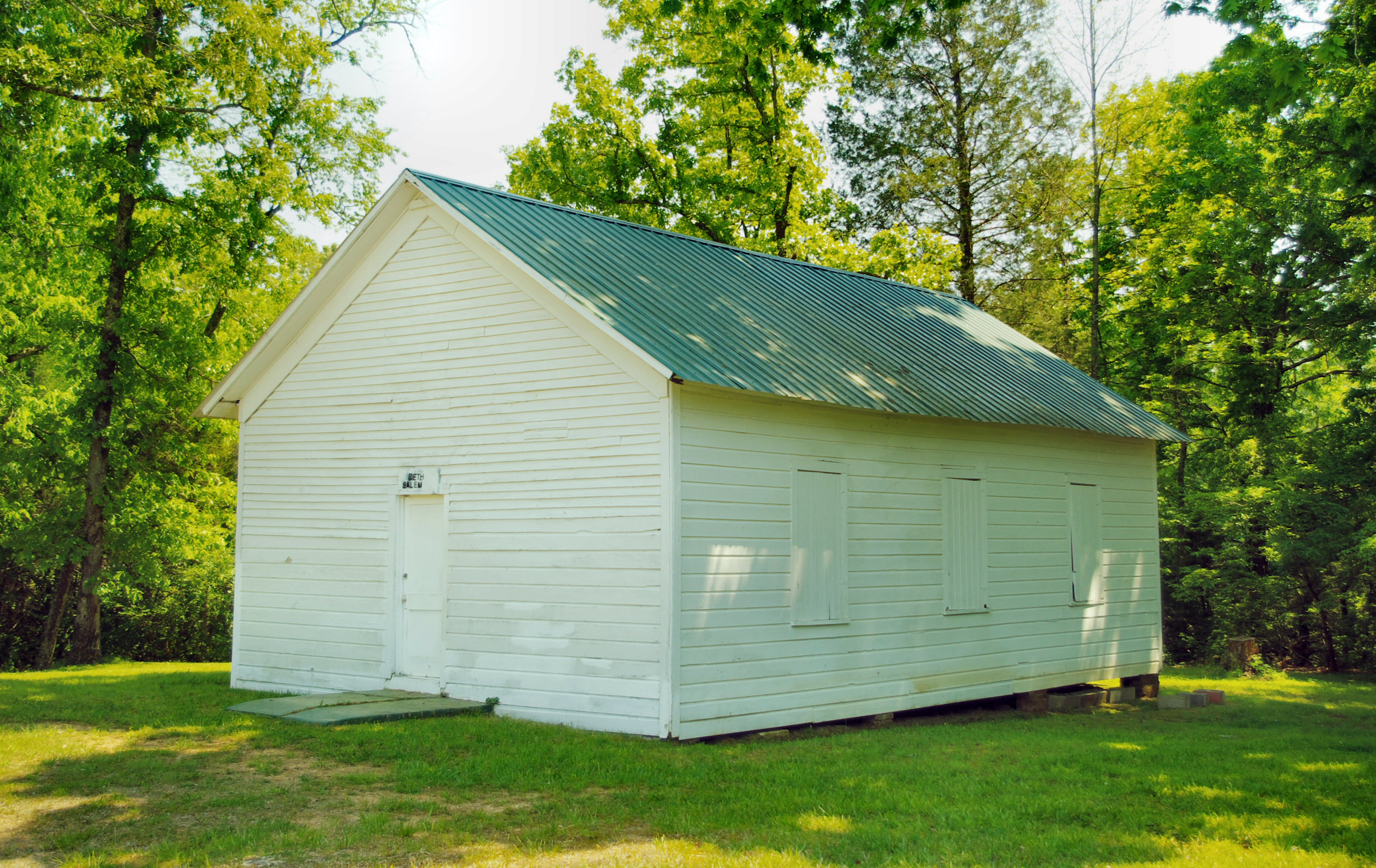

- Location within Tennessee Location within the United States
- Nearest city: Athens, Tennessee
- Coordinates: 35°23′26″N 84°34′9″W
- Area: 1 acre (0.40 ha)
- Built: 1920
- MPS: Rural African-American Churches in Tennessee MPS
- NRHP reference No.: 00000728
- Added to NRHP: June 22, 2000

Beth Salem Presbyterian Church is a historic African-American church in Athens, Tennessee.

The congregation was organized in 1866 with support from [missionaries], making Beth Salem the first African American church in the three-county farming region of McMinn, Meigs, and Polk counties.

At first, the congregation held its services under a brush arbor. After a local neighbor, Ms. Patsy Fite, donated land for a building, a log church was built. After the log building was destroyed by fire around 1920, the current building was built using donated lumber and the volunteer labor of both black church members and their white neighbors.

The 1920 church building is a one-story, one-room, rectangular frame structure with a gable front entrance, weatherboard siding, and a metal roof. It also housed a public school that was used about 3-4 months a year. It typifies a vernacular architectural tradition common in rural African-American churches during the Jim Crow era. It was added to the National Register of Historic Places in 2000.
