= McMinn Central High School =

American public high school

Location
- 145 County Road 461, Englewood, Tennessee postal address United States
- 35.377°N 84.503°W

Information
- Type: Public
- Established: 1966
- School district: McMinn County School System
- Teaching staff: 45.50 (FTE)
- Grades: 9-12
- Enrollment: 619 (2023-2024)
- Colors: Columbia blue and white
- Team name: Chargers
- Website: www.mcminncentral.com

Central High School of McMinn County, more commonly known as McMinn Central High School (MCHS) or Central High School is a public high school located in unincorporated McMinn County, Tennessee. It has an Englewood postal address but is not in the town limits. Its mascot is the Charger, and it is one of two high schools in the McMinn County School System, the other being McMinn County High School with which it maintains a rivalry.

== History ==
It opened in fall 1966 as a consolidation of Englewood High School and Etowah High School in Etowah, with the location deliberately between the two cities. The first graduating class graduated in 1967. When Cook High School closed due to desegregation, McMinn Central absorbed some of the students.

== Athletics ==
McMinn Central is a member of the Tennessee Secondary School Athletic Association (TSSAA). Sports include baseball, basketball, cheerleading, cross country, football, swimming, golf, soccer, softball, tennis, track and field, volleyball, and wrestling.

=== State championships ===
- Girls' basketball - 2011
- Girls' track and field - 1981, 2011
- Wrestling - 1999

== History ==
The school was founded in 1966 out of a merger of three high schools: Etowah, Englewood, and Cook High Schools. It has since grown to serve more than 700 students.

== Notable alumni ==
- Kevin Raper (1982), politician
