= Claxton, McMinn County, Tennessee =

Unincorporated community in Tennessee, US

Claxton is an unincorporated community in McMinn County, Tennessee, United States. Claxton used to have a community school but it closed in the 1970s, however it does have a local volunteer fire department and a Dollar General.

Claxton is located at 35°18′14″N 84°38′40″W.
