= McMinn County Schools =

School district in Tennessee, United States

Address
- 3 South Hill Street Athens, Tennessee; United States
- Coordinates: 35.44131°N 84.59467°W

District information
- Grades: PreK–12
- Director of Schools: Lee Parkison
- Schools: 9
- NCES District ID: 4702820

Students and staff
- Students: 5,493
- Teachers: 343 (FTE)

Other information
- Website: Official website

McMinn County School District or McMinn County Schools is a school district headquartered in Athens, Tennessee.

Most of McMinn County is zoned to the district for all grade levels. Residents of Athens and Etowah however have separate school districts for PreKindergarten through 8th grade, but attend McMinn County Schools-operated facilities for grades 9–12.

In 2020, the district had 5,493 students. It had two high schools, seven middle schools, seven elementary schools, and seven preschools.

The demographics of the county are that as of 2019 it was 92% white, 3% Hispanic or Latino, and 2% black. 19.4% of families had an income that was below the poverty level, and 27.7% of families were receiving Supplemental Nutrition Assistance Program benefits. A total of 52.6% of the population had a high school education or less.

As of January 2022 the Director of Schools is Lee Parkison.

== Student performance ==
As of 2022, a total of 31% of elementary school students tested at or above the proficient level for reading, and 40% tested did so for math. Also, 31% of middle school students tested at or above the proficient level for reading, and 40% did so for math. Furthermore 34% of high school students tested at or above the proficient level for reading, and 22% did so for math.

== History ==
The 1870 Tennessee constitution prevented black and white children from attending the same public schools, barring integration.

In 1873 an election was held on the question of whether to have a school tax, and the proposal was voted down. As a result, the county had no schools other than some subscription schools. Subsequently, however, a new school law was passed.

In 1875, McMinn County had 56 white schools and 10 "colored" schools. The schools taught for an average of three and a half months each year. The County Superintendent praised the focus on orthography at the schools.

In the 1920s, the majority of black children in McMinn County attended school at the Rosenwald School Building Program's schools at Athens, East Etowah, West Etowah, and Union.

In February 1942, Lake Robinson became the superintendent.

In 1954 the U.S. Supreme Court decision in Brown v. Board of Education, in which the Court ruled that U.S. state laws establishing racial segregation in public schools are unconstitutional, even if the segregated schools are otherwise equal in quality, marked the beginning of the end for Tennessee's African-American high schools. It took about 15 years for high school integration to work its way throughout Tennessee. Cooke High School in Athens in McMinn County was one of the African-American schools that closed down as a result of integration.

The 1956 Tennessee educational census reported fewer than 100 school-age black children in McMinn.

After the Civil Rights Act of 1964 was passed, Tennessee began to integrate schools.

A 1999 Tennessee state study of Tennessee schools found that McMinn County Schools teacher salaries were 110% of the state median (and Athens City teacher salaries were 122% of the state median), on a Tennessee Teacher Cost Index basis, ranking it in the top 17% in the state.

Parkinson became the head of the school system in 2018.

== Maus book controversy ==
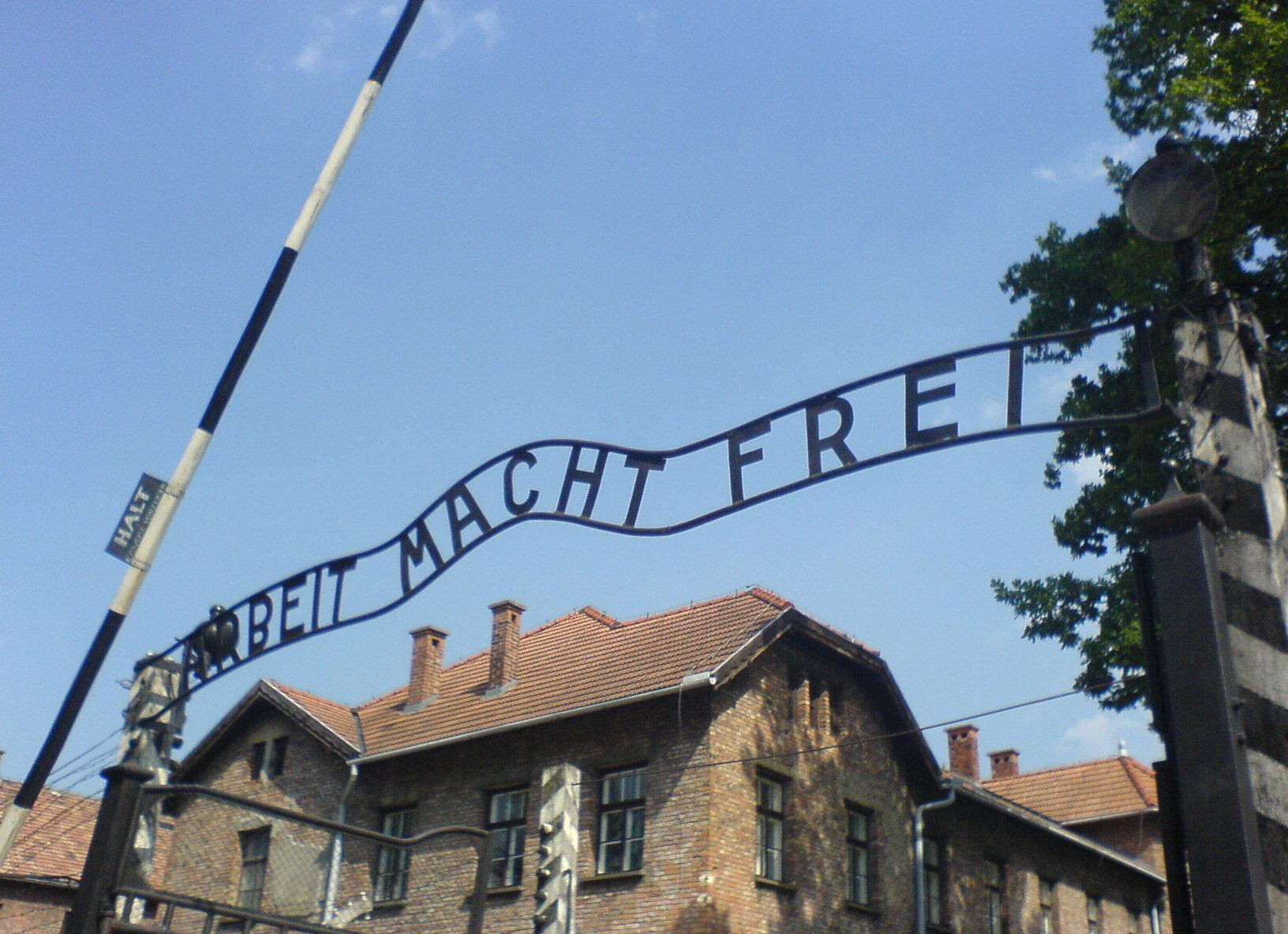
Spiegelman visited the Auschwitz concentration camp in 1979 as research for Maus; his parents had been imprisoned there.

In January 2022 the school board, in a 10-0 decision, removed the graphic novel about the Holocaust Maus, the only graphic novel ever to win a Pulitzer Prize, from its curriculum for 8th grade English classes. The board in doing so overrode a Tennessee state curriculum review that had in contrast approved the teaching of the book. According to the school district, the reasons that it removed the book were “unnecessary” profanity (they focused on some bad words, such as "damn"), depictions of nude mice, murder, and suicide, and what the board deemed the values of the community; in addition, a board member pointed out that at one time in the past the author of Maus had drawn cartoons for Playboy magazine. A former teacher who spoke at the meeting observed, in contrast, that “there is nothing pretty about the Holocaust, and for me this was a great way to depict a horrific time in history.” This decision to bar the teaching of the book occurred in proximity to Holocaust Remembrance Day, and during various attempts to remove reading material from other school districts.

Author Art Spiegelman criticized the move, describing it variously as baffling, "Orwellian", and “daffily myopic.” The board's decision was covered by media in the United States, Europe, and Israel. Spiegelman, whose parents survived the Auschwitz concentration camp, also observed that he got the impression that the board members were asking, “Why can’t they teach a nicer Holocaust?”

The Tennessean noted the swelling of significant backlash from politicians, journalists, organizations, and others. Tennessee State Representative John Ray Clemmons (D-Nashville), criticizing the board's action, said "Books are being stripped out of public libraries that give detailed personal accounts from survivors and about victims of the Holocaust." Tennessee's United States Representative Jim Cooper (D-Nashville), called the decision "outrageous" and "really shameful." In addition, Tennessee's United States Representative Steve Cohen (D-Memphis), condemning the book's removal, said he hoped to see the school board's decision reversed. Tennessee Wesleyan University librarian Alex Sharp, in McMinn County, said that banning the book because "[b]ecause it has eight swear words? Okay, I'm sorry. But children see more than eight swear words in one TikTok video nowadays."

Following the board's banning of the book from its curriculum, the book became an Amazon best-seller. On 28 January 2022, it was # 1 in the categories of fiction satire, and comics and graphic novels, and # 7 overall for all books (as Maus 1 was # 5 overall for books). Neither book was in the top 1,000 a week prior. An Episcopal church in the county announced that it would conduct a discussion of Maus on 3 February, which would include a discussion about the complicity of many churches in the extermination of Jews during the Holocaust.

The owner of the Nirvana Comics bookstore 15 miles (24 km) away from McMinn County in Knoxville, Tennessee, offered loans of "The Complete Maus" to any student, and donors sent him $30,000 to help fund his efforts. He said: "We’re getting requests from parents all over the country, even Europe, asking for copies," and believed the surprisingly strong response reflected the view that "That’s not what we do in America: ‘We don’t ban books.’ It triggered a very American response."

== Schools ==
High schools

- McMinn Central High School (unincorporated area, Englewood address)
- McMinn County High School (Athens)

Elementary schools

- E.K. Baker Elementary School (unincorporated area, Athens postal address)
- Calhoun Elementary School (Calhoun)
- Englewood Elementary School (Englewood)
- Mountain View Elementary School (unincorporated area, Etowah postal address)
- Niota Elementary School (Niota)
- Riceville Elementary School (Riceville, unincorporated area)
- Rogers Creek Elementary School (unincorporated area, Athens postal address)

Other

- McMinn Career and Tech Center

Former schools

- Cook High School
- Englewood High School - A fire destroyed the building in December 1963. McMinn Central opened in fall 1966, with students from Englewood and Etowah.
- Etowah High School - It consolidated into McMinn Central in 1966.

== See also ==
- Athens City Schools - PreK-8 school district for Athens
