= Conasauga, McMinn County, Tennessee =

Conasauga, Tennessee
- Unincorporated community
- Location within Tennessee Location within the United States
- Coordinates: 35°19′47″N 84°28′36″W
- Country: United States
- State: Tennessee
- County: McMinn
- Elevation: 787 ft (240 m)
- Time zone: UTC-5 (Eastern (EST))
  - Summer (DST): UTC-4 (EDT)
- Area code: 423
- GNIS feature ID: 1327960

Conasauga is an unincorporated community in McMinn County, Tennessee, United States.
