= Waynesboro Cumberland Presbyterian Church =

Historic church in Tennessee, United States

- U.S. National Register of Historic Places
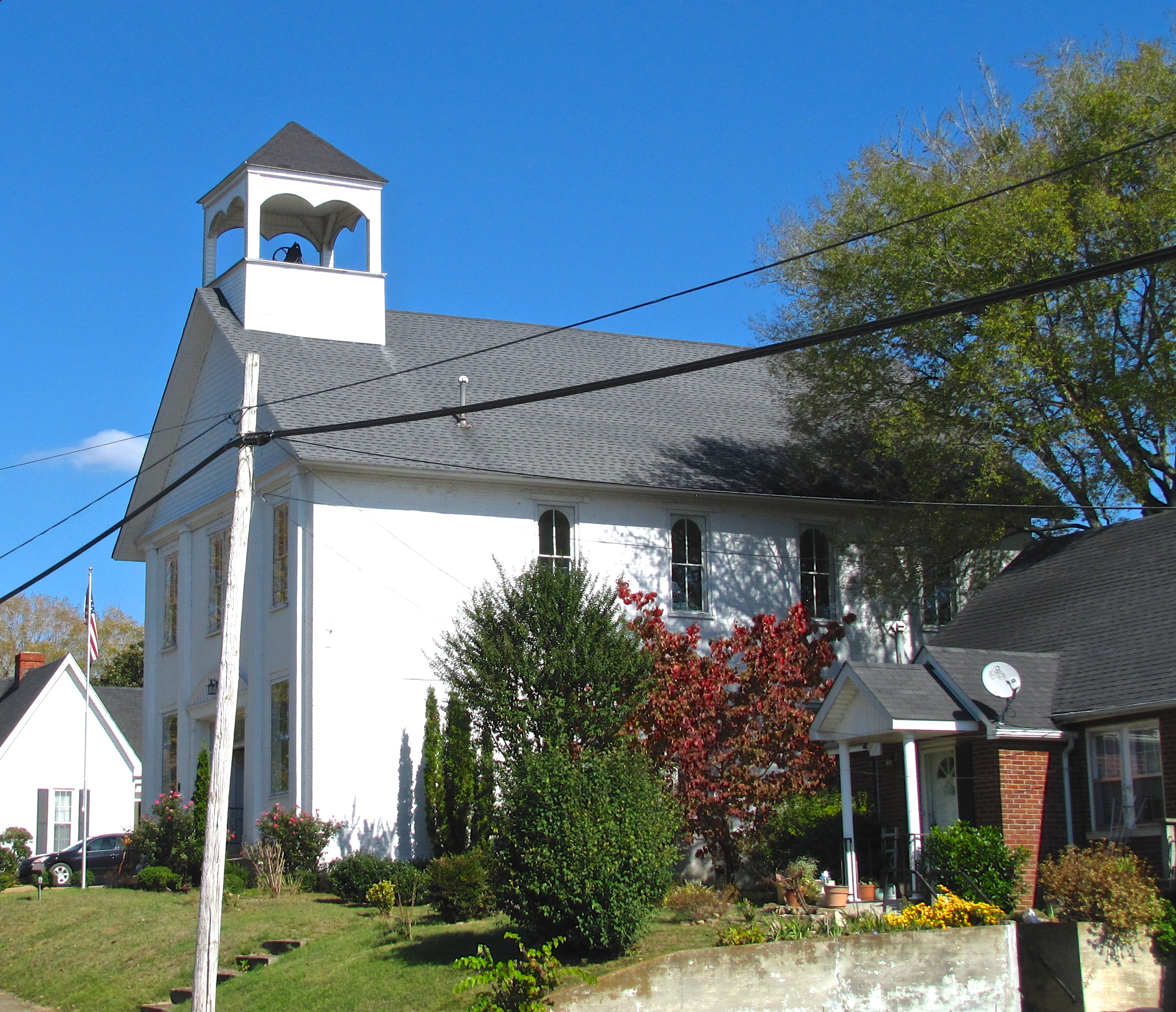

- Location within Tennessee Location within the United States
- Location: High St., Waynesboro, Tennessee
- Coordinates: 35°19′16″N 87°45′48″W
- Area: less than one acre
- Built: 1854
- Architectural style: Greek Revival
- NRHP reference No.: 87001877
- Added to NRHP: October 22, 1987

Waynesboro Cumberland Presbyterian Church is a historic church of the Cumberland Presbyterian denomination on High Street in Waynesboro, Tennessee.

The congregation was organized circa 1846. Its present brick building, which was dedicated in October 1854, is the oldest structure in Wayne County that has remained in continuous use. The church was expanded twice, in 1946 and 1953, both times to add space for Sunday school activities. Until 1977, the church used the first story of the building and the second story was used by Freemasons.

The church building was added to the National Register of Historic Places in 1987.
