= Clear Springs Cumberland Presbyterian Church =

Historic church in Tennessee, United States

- U.S. National Register of Historic Places
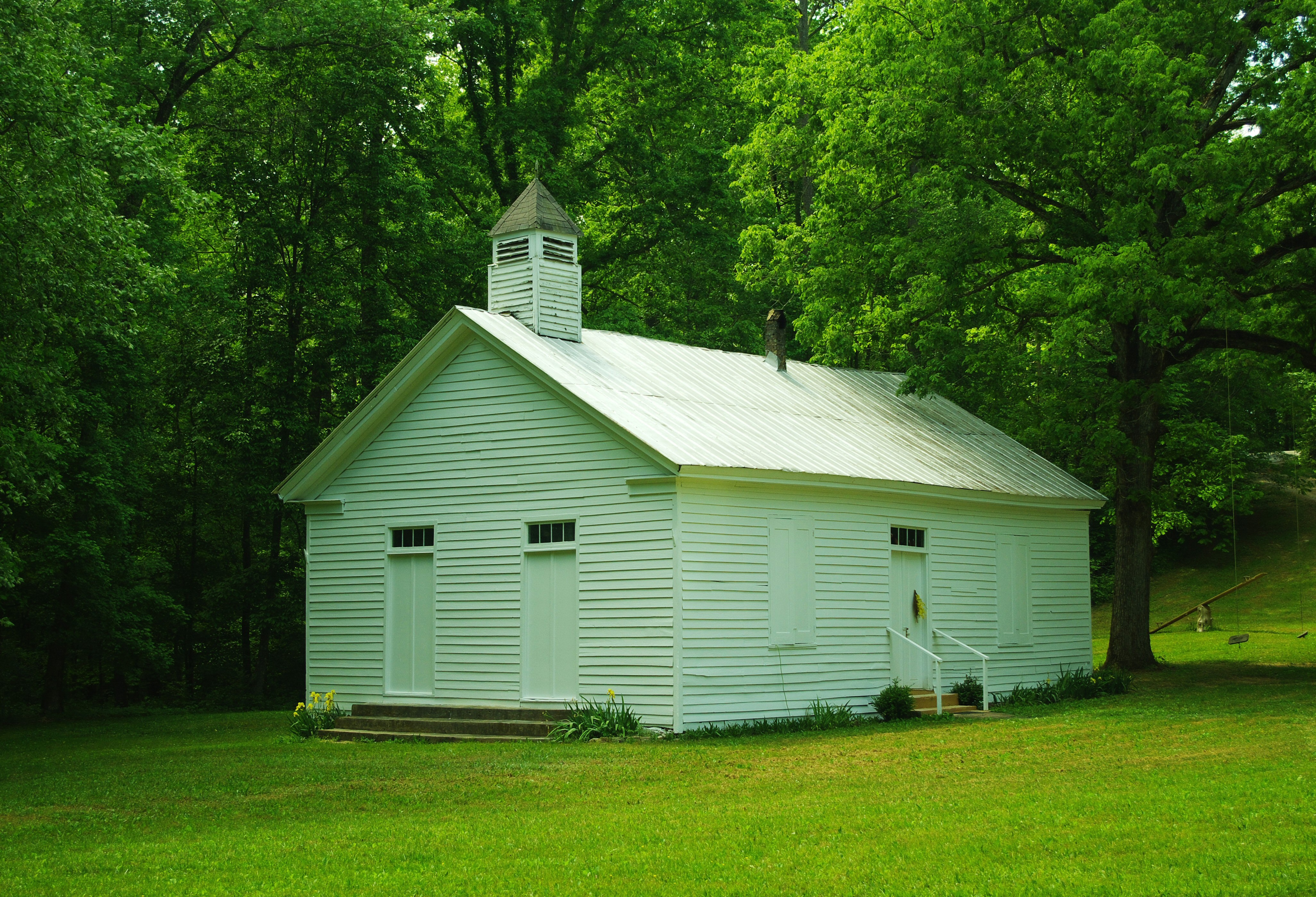

- Location within Tennessee Location within the United States
- Location: Clear Springs Rd., Calhoun, Tennessee
- Coordinates: 35°16′13″N 84°41′22″W
- Area: 7 acres (2.8 ha)
- Built: 1860
- Architectural style: Gable-Front
- NRHP reference No.: 06001337
- Added to NRHP: February 1, 2007

Clear Springs Cumberland Presbyterian Church is a historic church of the Cumberland Presbyterian denomination in McMinn County, Tennessee, about 6 miles (9.7 km) southeast of Calhoun. The church building, which is no longer in use, is listed on the National Register of Historic Places.

The Clear Springs congregation formed in the late 1830s or early 1840s, originally calling itself Pleasant Hill Church. The "Clear Springs" name was adopted in the 1850s. Before completing its church building in 1860, the congregation conducted services in a large camp meeting shelter. The building is a single-story gable-front church with a one-room sanctuary that measures 40 feet (12 m) by 28 feet (8.5 m). Its square wooden steeple, which has wood vents and a pyramidal roof, holds the church's original bell. The building has multi-light windows, wooden shutters, and wide board walls. When the church was in active use, it was heated by a pot-bellied stove that sat in the center of the sanctuary.

The congregation became inactive in the decades before and after World War II, although its building continued to be maintained and saw periodic use for weddings, homecomings, and other special occasions. In 1976, the building was taken over by the denomination's presbytery. It continues to be used occasionally for funerals and other events. The church, its cemetery, and a baptismal pool located at a spring on the church grounds were added to the National Register in 2007. Its listing recognized it as "a rare unaltered example of a modest rural church building" that typifies the characteristic "functional and unadorned style" of churches in the area.
