= Manchester Cumberland Presbyterian Church =

Historic church in Tennessee, United States

- Formerly listed on the U.S. National Register of Historic Places
- Location within Tennessee Location within the United States
- Location: Jct. of Church and W. High Sts., Manchester, Tennessee
- Coordinates: 35°29′4″N 86°5′26″W
- Area: 0.3 acres (0.12 ha)
- Built: 1890
- Architect: Thomas Nelson Scott
- Architectural style: Gothic Revival
- NRHP reference No.: 92000781

Significant dates
- Added to NRHP: June 29, 1992
- Removed from NRHP: Octjber 28, 2021

Manchester Cumberland Presbyterian Church is a historic Cumberland Presbyterian congregation in Manchester, Tennessee. Its former church building, also known as the Church Street Theatre, is listed on the National Register of Historic Places.

The church was organized in 1854. Its first church was a two-story wooden frame building that was shared with local Masons, who held the meetings upstairs from the church.

The church's second building, built in 1890, is a brick building of Gothic Revival design located at the corner of Church and W. High Streets in Manchester. In 1961, the church vacated this building when it moved to its present location on the corner of McArthur and Coffee Streets. The 1890 church building was added to the National Register in 1992, and was delisted in 2021.
