= New Bethel Cumberland Presbyterian Church =

Historic church in Tennessee, United States

- U.S. National Register of Historic Places
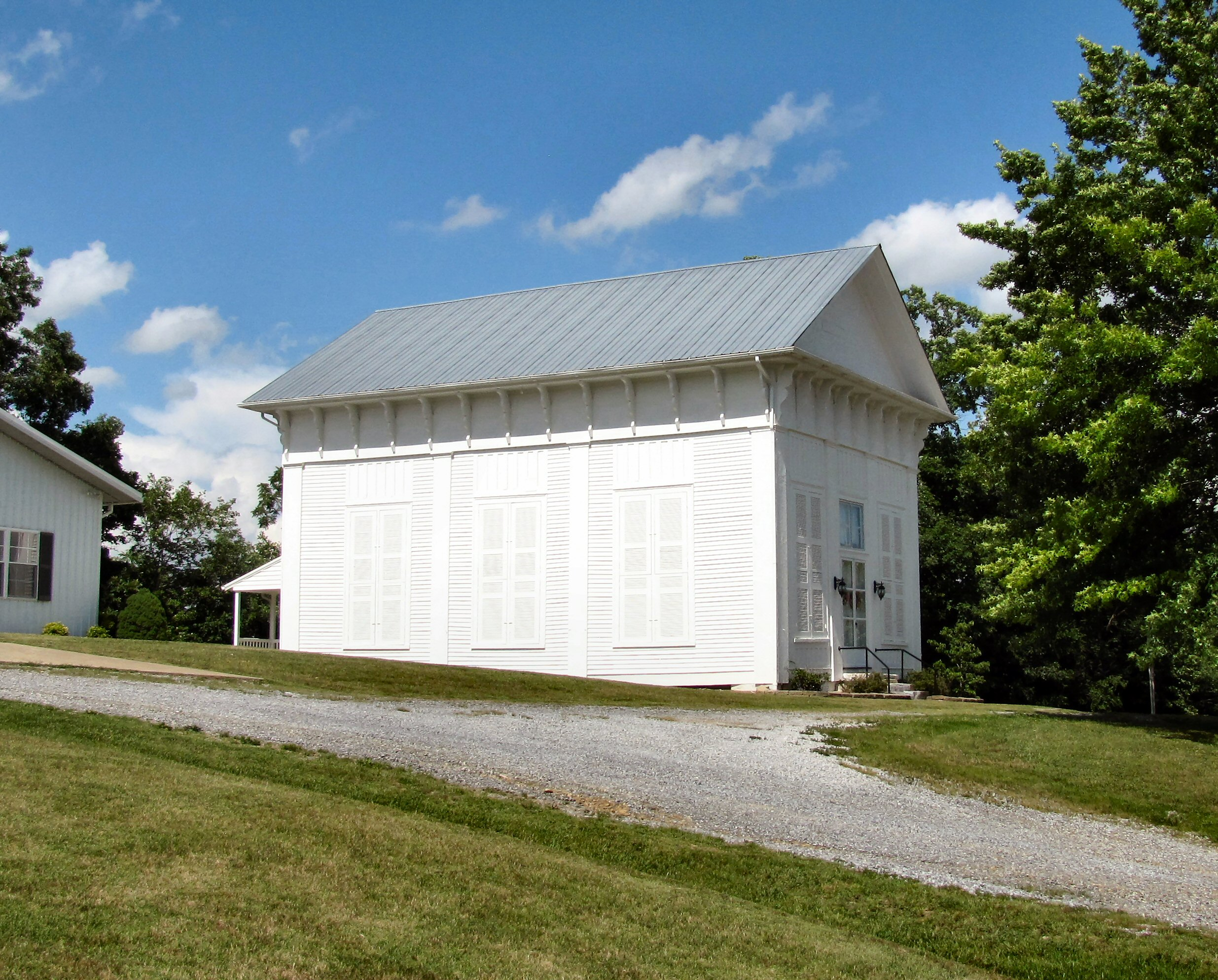

- Location within Tennessee Location within the United States
- Nearest city: Greeneville, Tennessee
- Coordinates: 36°11′43″N 82°53′1″W
- Area: 1 acre (0.40 ha)
- Built: 1841
- Architectural style: Vernacular Greek Revival
- NRHP reference No.: 78002592
- Added to NRHP: October 05, 1978

New Bethel Cumberland Presbyterian Church is a historic church building near Greeneville in rural Greene County, Tennessee, United States.

The New Bethel congregation formed in 1839 after 38 citizens of Greene County successfully petitioned the Knoxville Presbytery of the Cumberland Presbyterian Church for the organization of a new congregation. The church building was constructed in 1841 on a 4-acre (1.6 ha) tract donated by John Harmon. Funds for its construction were donated by James Carter, a local resident who had aspired to join the ministry, but died before he could realize his dream.

The building is of wood frame construction with rural Vernacular Greek Revival styling that stresses simplicity. It was added to the National Register of Historic Places in 1978.
