= Pleasant Mount Cumberland Presbyterian Church =

Historic church in Tennessee, United States

- U.S. National Register of Historic Places
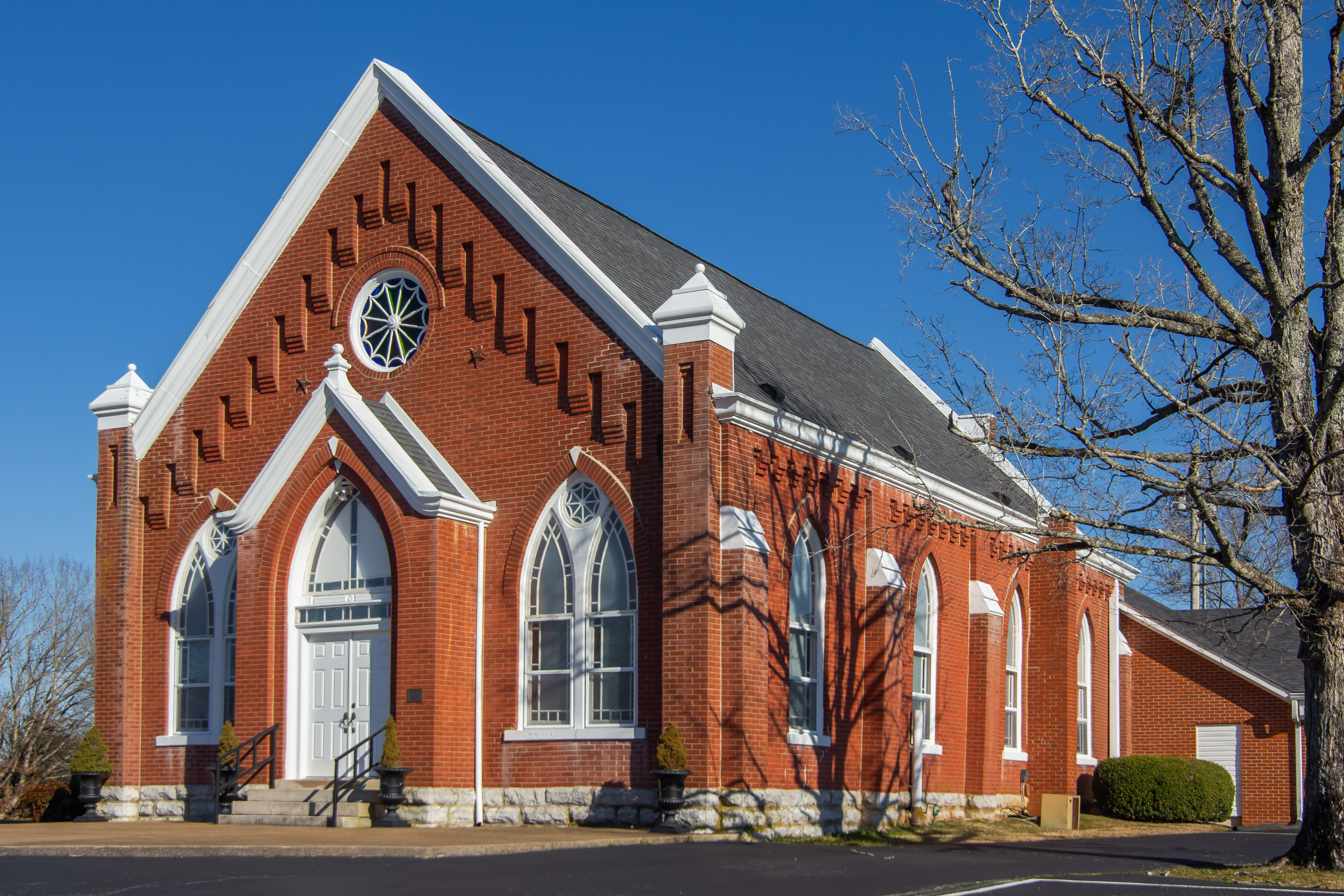
- Pleasant Mount Cumberland Presbyterian Church

- Location within Tennessee Location within the United States
- Nearest city: Columbia, Tennessee
- Coordinates: 35°32′32″N 86°58′8″W
- Area: 4 acres (1.6 ha)
- Built: 1899
- Architectural style: Late Gothic Revival
- NRHP reference No.: 77001282
- Added to NRHP: August 16, 1977

Pleasant Mount Cumberland Presbyterian Church is a Cumberland Presbyterian church in Columbia, Tennessee.

The church building was constructed in 1899 and added to the National Register of Historic Places in 1977.
