= Cumberland Presbyterian Church of Loudon =

Historic church in Tennessee, United States

- U.S. National Register of Historic Places
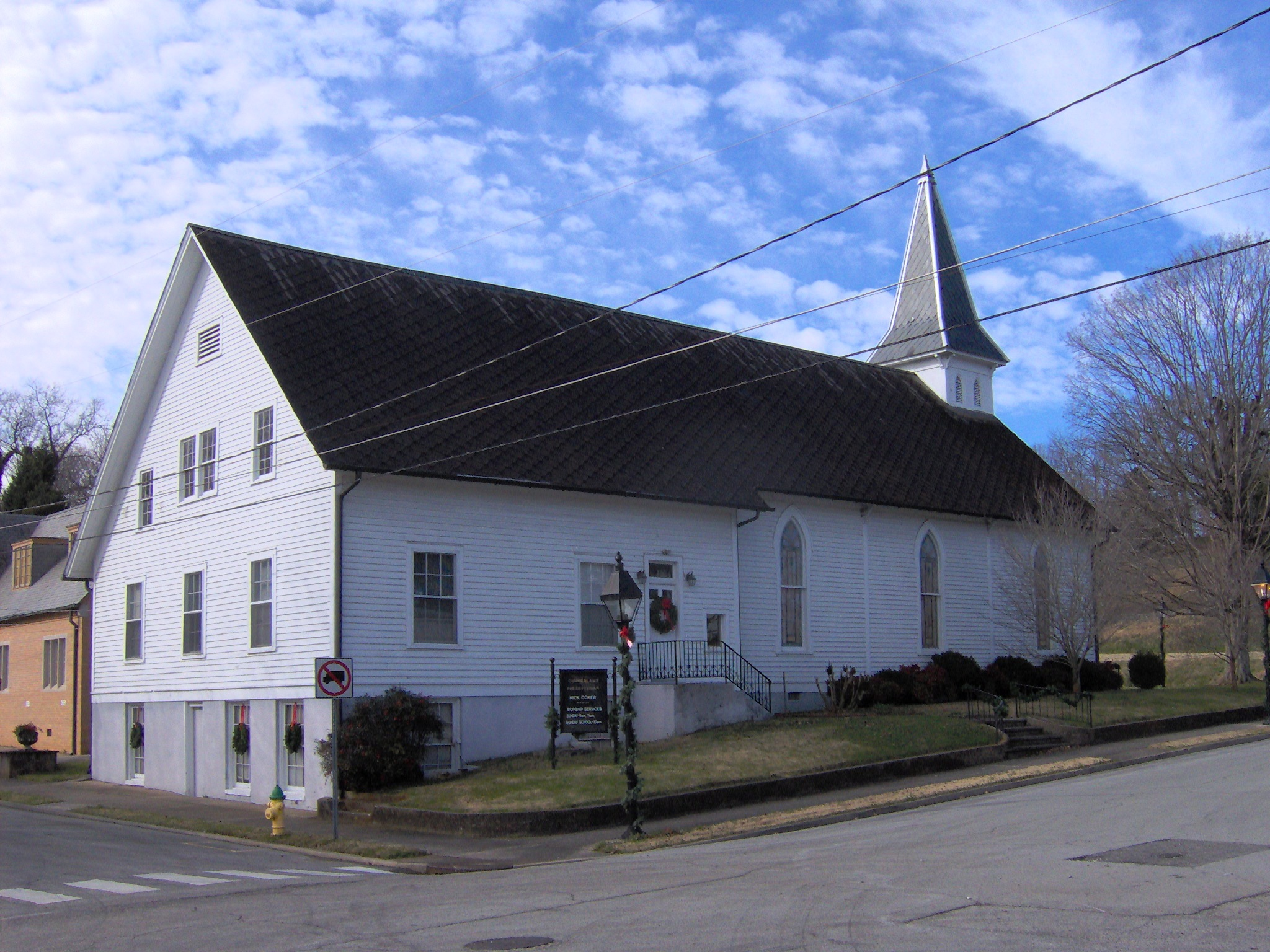

- Location within Tennessee Location within the United States
- Location: College St., Loudon, Tennessee
- Coordinates: 35°44′28″N 84°20′21″W
- Area: 0.5 acres (0.20 ha)
- Built: 1882
- Architect: Clark, J.W.
- Architectural style: Gothic
- NRHP reference No.: 82003988
- Added to NRHP: April 15, 1982

Loudon Cumberland Presbyterian Church is a historic church of the Cumberland Presbyterian denomination, located on College Street in Loudon, Tennessee.

The congregation was established in Loudon in August 1853, although its official records begin in March 1855.

The church building, which was the congregation's third home, is a Carpenter Gothic design. The building was completed and dedicated in 1882. It was added to the National Register of Historic Places in 1982.
