= Etowah Depot =

Former railway station in Tennessee

Etowah
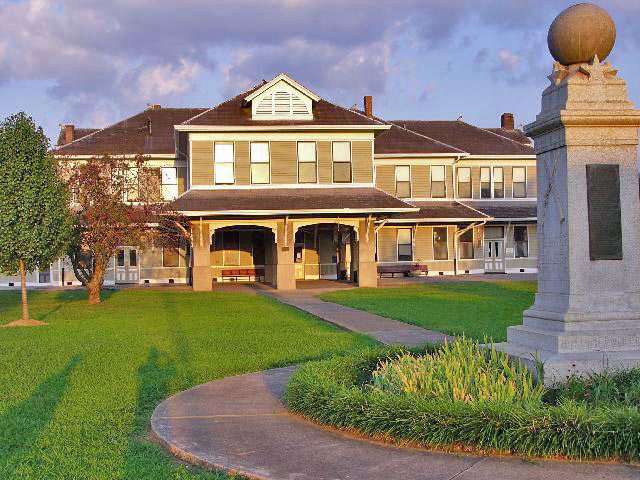
- The station building in 2011

General information
- Location: U.S. Route 411; Etowah, Tennessee
- Coordinates: 35°19′24″N 84°31′28″W
- Owner: City of Etowah

History
- Opened: November 1906
- Closed: 1968
- Original company: Louisville and Nashville Railroad

Former services
Preceding station	Louisville and Nashville Railroad	Following station
Addison toward Cincinnati	Cincinnati – Atlanta	Delano toward Atlanta
Addison toward Knoxville	Knoxville – Atlanta via Blue Ridge	Cambria toward Atlanta
- Etowah Depot
- U.S. National Register of Historic Places
- Location within Tennessee Location within the United States
- NRHP reference No.: 77001513
- Added to NRHP: October 17, 1977
Location

Etowah Depot is a former railway station in Etowah, Tennessee. The Louisville and Nashville Railroad (L&N) selected the site as a maintenance facility and station for their new mainline, with construction beginning in 1905. Passenger service began in November 1906. Construction costs for the building amounted to $13,000 (equivalent to $465,833 in 2025). The depot's significance waned after 1929 when the L&Ns rolling stock was being converted from wood to steel construction and repair shops were moved to Knoxville. Passenger service ceased with the last run of the Flamingo in 1968 and the depot was closed for all railway use in 1974. It was added to the National Register of Historic Places on October 17, 1977. The Louisville and Nashville sold the depot to the city in 1981 for $35,000, who set about restoring the station building.
