= Regret, Tennessee =

- Unincorporated community
- Location within Tennessee Location within the United States
- Coordinates: 35°37′55″N 84°36′25″W
- Country: United States
- State: Tennessee
- County: McMinn
- Elevation: 860 ft (260 m)
- Time zone: UTC-5 (Eastern (EST))
  - Summer (DST): UTC-4 (EDT)
- GNIS feature ID: 1307560

Regret was an unincorporated community in McMinn County, Tennessee, United States. Its post office has been closed.
