= Niota station =

- Niota Depot
- U.S. National Register of Historic Places
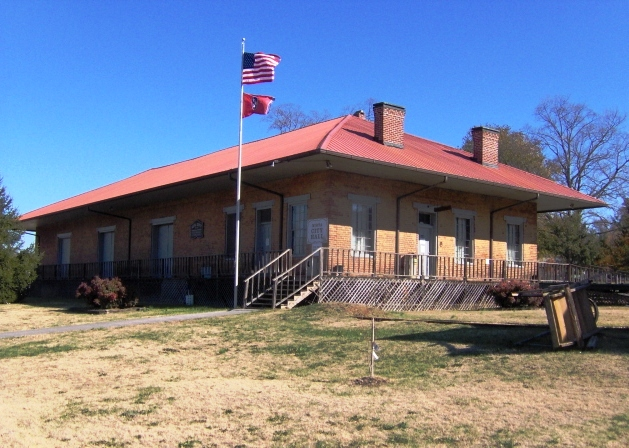

- Location within Tennessee
- Location: Main St., Niota, Tennessee
- Coordinates: 35°30′55″N 84°32′46″W
- Built: 1853
- NRHP reference No.: 75002105
- Added to NRHP: April 1, 1975

The Niota Depot is a historic railroad depot in Niota in the U.S. state of Tennessee. Built in 1854 by the East Tennessee and Georgia Railroad Company, it is the oldest remaining pre–Civil War railroad depot in the state. On its construction it bore the original name of the town, as Mouse Creek Station. It was briefly used as a makeshift fort by Unionist artillery companies tasked with guarding the railway. In 1894, it was acquired by the Southern Railway Company, which used it continuously until 1972, whereupon it was acquired by the City of Niota. It now serves as the Niota city hall, and an events venue.

Preceding station	Southern Railway	Following station
Athens toward Memphis	Memphis – Bristol	Reagan toward Bristol
