= Etowah, Tennessee =

City in McMinn County, Tennessee, United States

Etowah
- City
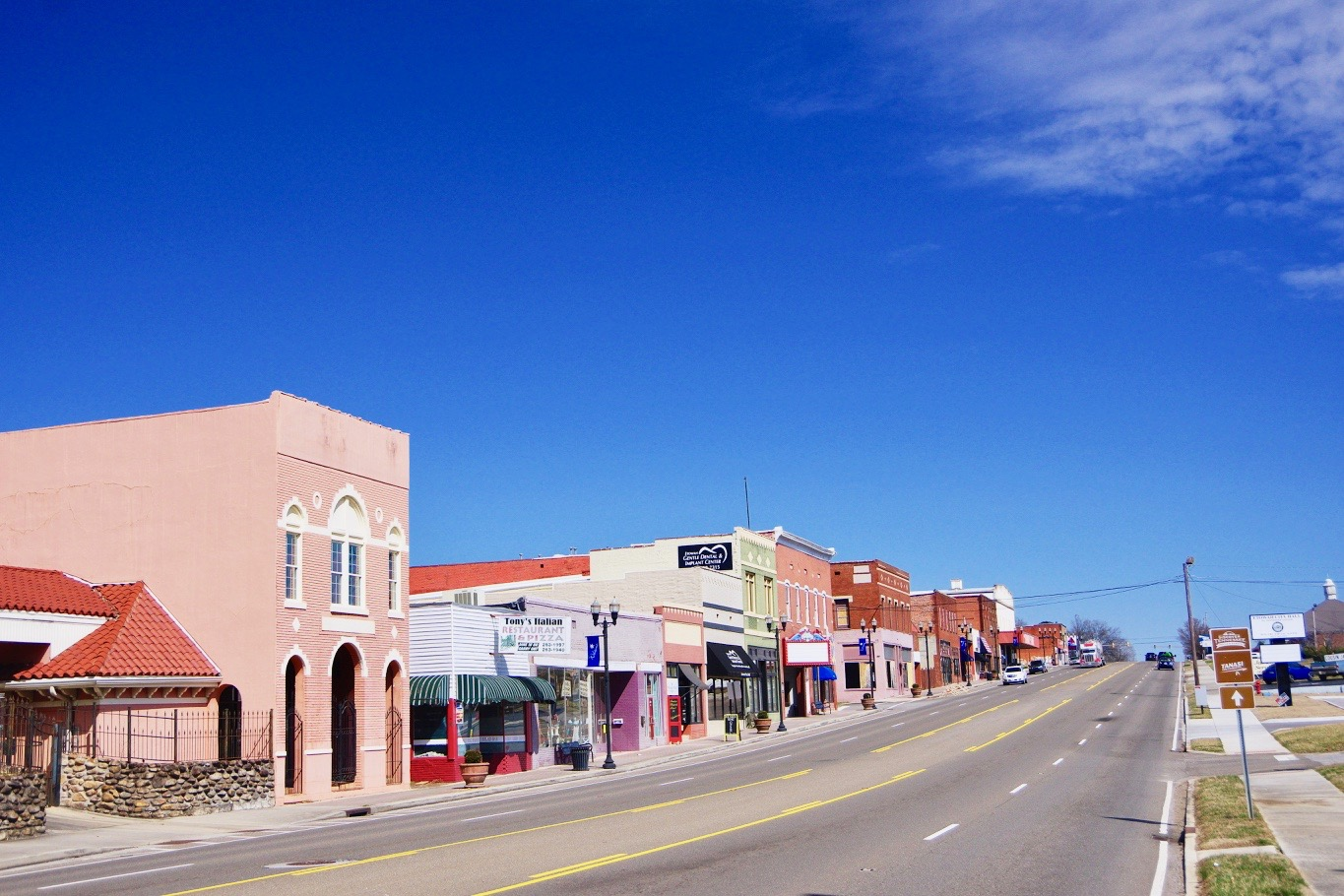
- Tennessee Avenue (US 411) in Etowah

- Location of Etowah in McMinn County, Tennessee.
- Coordinates: 35°19′46″N 84°31′42″W
- Country: United States
- State: Tennessee
- County: McMinn
- Founded: 1906
- Incorporated: 1909
- Named for: Creek (Muskogee) word for "The Town", the nickname for Coosa, capital of the northern Creeks

Government
  - Type: Council/Manager
  - Mayor: Jim Swayne
  - City Manager: Russ Blair

Area
  - Total: 2.83 sq mi (7.32 km^{2})
  - Land: 2.83 sq mi (7.32 km^{2})
  - Water: 0 sq mi (0.00 km^{2})
- Elevation: 807 ft (246 m)

Population (2020)
  - Total: 3,603
  - Density: 1,275.0/sq mi (492.27/km^{2})
- Time zone: UTC-5 (Eastern (EST))
  - Summer (DST): UTC-4 (EDT)
- ZIP code: 37331
- Area code: 423
- FIPS code: 47-24480
- GNIS feature ID: 1328151
- Website: cityofetowahtn.com

Etowah is a city in McMinn County in the U.S. state of Tennessee. The population was 3,613 at the 2020 census.

== History ==
Etowah was founded in 1906, primarily as a location for a depot on the Louisville & Nashville Railroad (L&N) line as part of a more direct route between Atlanta and Cincinnati. The etymology of the town name is unclear, but local folklore states that a train crew brought a sign reading "Etowah" from the Etowah River, and the name stuck. The word Etowah comes from the Muskogee/Creek word italwa meaning "town."

In 1902, the Louisville and Nashville Railroad announced its plan to build a more direct line from Atlanta to Cincinnati in order to avoid the rugged mountains of North Georgia and East Tennessee bypassing the Great Hiwassee Loop. A point midway between these cities was needed to service cars and change crews, and at the end of 1904, land had been purchased in McMinn County to serve as this site and the city of Etowah was planned. The L & N purchased 1,454 acres (5.88 km^{2}) for the main terminus (depot), maintenance and repair facilities (shops), railroad yards and proposed township to support the railroad workforce. This land was purchased at $10 to $20 per acre and the L&N set about building a major rail center and the town of Etowah.

Out of what was referred to then as a wet swampland, a boomtown sprung up in 1906 with the L & N Depot serving as the hub of the new town's business and social activities. Since then, the City of Etowah has ridden the waves of economic downturns and successes, such as the closing of the L & N shops in the 1930s and the recruitment of new industries, to evolve into the city that it is today. Etowah has seen positive growth in industry and retail over the past decade.

In 1974, Etowah residents Doug, Carol and Michael Tullock started the Bargain Barn grocery store, which has since grown into a chain that includes 39 stores in 5 states.

On April 3, 1974, an F3 tornado struck southern Etowah, destroying 23 homes and killing 3 people. The tornado was one of many in the 1974 Super Outbreak.

== Geography ==
Etowah is located at 35°19′46″N 84°31′42″W (35.329579, −84.528196).

According to the United States Census Bureau, the city has a total area of 2.8 square miles (7.2 km^{2}), all of it land.

== Demographics ==
Historical population
Census	Pop.	Note	%±
1910	1,685		—
1920	2,516		49.3%
1930	4,209		67.3%
1940	3,362		−20.1%
1950	3,261		−3.0%
1960	3,223		−1.2%
1970	3,736		15.9%
1980	3,758		0.6%
1990	3,815		1.5%
2000	3,663		−4.0%
2010	3,490		−4.7%
2020	3,603		3.2%

=== 2020 census ===
As of the 2020 census, Etowah had a population of 3,603 and 882 families residing in the city. The median age was 42.0 years, 23.5% of residents were under the age of 18, and 21.9% of residents were 65 years of age or older. For every 100 females there were 89.9 males, and for every 100 females age 18 and over there were 83.9 males age 18 and over.

One hundred percent of residents lived in urban areas, while 0.0% lived in rural areas.

There were 1,438 households in Etowah, of which 30.3% had children under the age of 18 living in them. Of all households, 38.9% were married-couple households, 17.5% were households with a male householder and no spouse or partner present, and 35.5% were households with a female householder and no spouse or partner present. About 31.7% of all households were made up of individuals and 16.9% had someone living alone who was 65 years of age or older.

There were 1,687 housing units, of which 14.8% were vacant. The homeowner vacancy rate was 4.5% and the rental vacancy rate was 6.2%.

Racial composition as of the 2020 census
Race	Number	Percent
White	3,158	87.6%
Black or African American	102	2.8%
American Indian and Alaska Native	11	0.3%
Asian	21	0.6%
Native Hawaiian and Other Pacific Islander	0	0.0%
Some other race	98	2.7%
Two or more races	213	5.9%
Hispanic or Latino (of any race)	183	5.1%

=== 2000 census ===
As of the census of 2000, there was a population of 3,663, with 1,545 households and 979 families residing in the city. The population density was 1,321.8 inhabitants per square mile (510.3/km^{2}). There were 1,769 housing units at an average density of 638.4 per square mile (246.5/km^{2}). The racial makeup of the city was 93.42% White, 3.25% African American, 0.38% Native American, 0.11% Asian, 0.08% Pacific Islander, 1.09% from other races, and 1.67% from two or more races. Hispanic or Latino of any race were 2.13% of the population.

There were 1,545 households, out of which 26.6% had children under the age of 18 living with them, 47.5% were married couples living together, 12.5% had a female householder with no husband present, and 36.6% were non-families. 32.8% of all households were made up of individuals, and 17.2% had someone living alone who was 65 years of age or older. The average household size was 2.25 and the average family size was 2.86.

In the city, the population was spread out, with 21.4% under the age of 18, 7.4% from 18 to 24, 25.6% from 25 to 44, 22.4% from 45 to 64, and 23.2% who were 65 years of age or older. The median age was 42 years. For every 100 females, there were 85.1 males. For every 100 females age 18 and over, there were 80.5 males.

The median income for a household in the city was $28,117, and the median income for a family was $33,034. Males had a median income of $27,824 versus $18,882 for females. The per capita income for the city was $15,298. About 7.4% of families and 15.9% of the population were below the poverty line, including 27.6% of those under age 18 and 13.7% of those age 65 or over.

== Government ==
The City of Etowah has a council-manager government. The Mayor sits as a Council member-at-large and presides over City Council meetings. In the event that the Mayor cannot preside over a City Council meeting, the Vice-Mayor is the presiding officer of the meeting until such time as the Mayor returns to his/her seat. The City Manager is responsible for the administration and the day-to-day operation of all of the municipal services and city departments. The City Manager also maintains intergovernmental relationships with federal, state, county and other local governments.

The primary law enforcement agency in the city is the City of Etowah Police Department. The city and the rest of the un-incorporated Etowah area are also under the jurisdiction of the McMinn County Sheriff's Office.

== Education ==
Etowah City Elementary School District operates a K–8 school, Etowah School. All of Etowah is within that district. McMinn County Schools operates the K–8 Mountain View Elementary School, which has an Etowah postal address but is outside of the city limits, and does not serve the city limits.

McMinn County Schools serves the city for high school. McMinn Central High School, between Etowah and Englewood, of the latter, serves area 9th–12th grade students. It was served by Etowah High School before McMinn Central opened in fall 1966, with students from Englewood and Etowah.

== Attractions ==
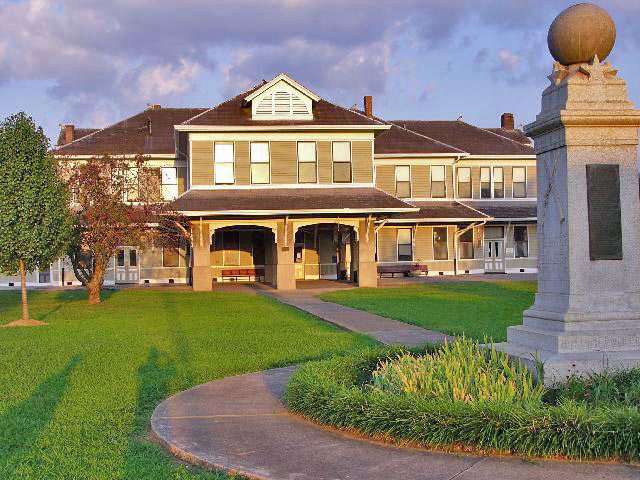
L&N Depot museum in Etowah

The Historic L&N Depot museum in Downtown Etowah is considered by many to be the main attraction in this small town. The historically African-American "Parkstown" neighborhood on the south side of Etowah has also seen renewed interest from tourists in recent years. An obvious presence in Etowah is the Gem Theater. Located in a building originally built in 1927 and purchased by the city of Etowah in 1993 and now is the location of local plays, concerts, movies and other events.

== Industry ==
The newest plant (Plant number 6) of the Waupaca Foundry, Inc. is located in Etowah. The plant makes quality grey and ductile steel components that are used in the automotive and farming markets. The foundry makes parts (such as control arms, differential covers and cases, and brake calipers) for the new Ford F-series heavy duty trucks, Dodge Caravan, Hummer H2, GMC Envoy, Chrysler 300C/Dodge Charger, and the Toyota Camry. Etowah also claims two other plants, Johns Manville and Huber, even though neither are actually located in the city limits.

== Notable people ==
- Paul Cantrell, politician and state senator.
- Al Clayton, photographer.
- Leon Daniel, journalist.
- Steel Arm Dickey, Negro leagues pitcher.
- Tom Saffell, former major league outfielder.
- Thomas W. Steed, United States military officer during World War II.
- Chris Whittle, American media and education executive.
- Janie Pangle Jones, the wife of Check Into Cash founder Allan Jones
