= McMinn County, Tennessee =

County in Tennessee, United States

- County
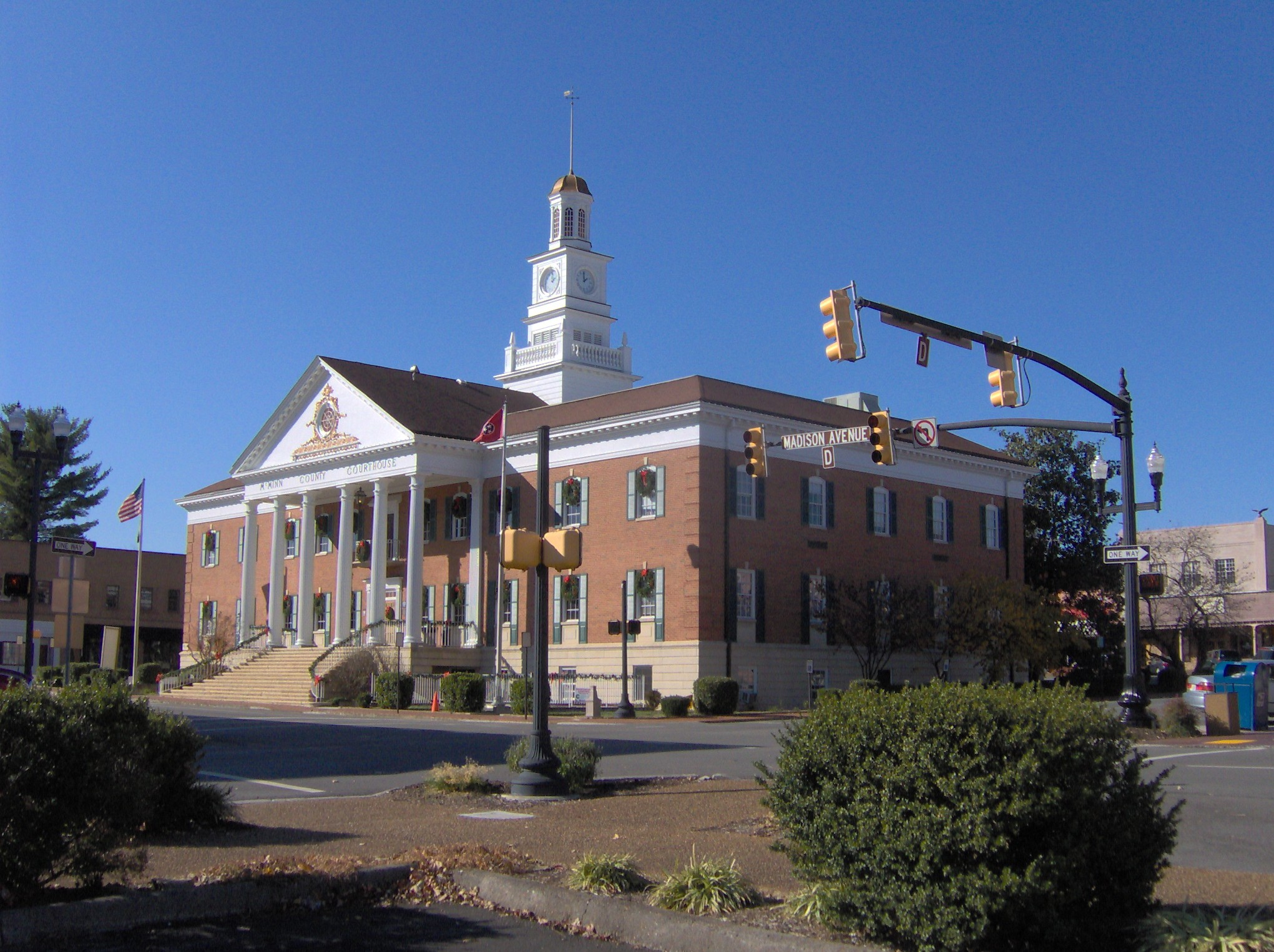
- McMinn County Courthouse in Athens

- Seal

- Location within the U.S. state of Tennessee
- Coordinates: 35.42°N 84.62°W
- Country: United States
- State: Tennessee
- Founded: 1819
- Named for: Joseph McMinn
- Seat: Athens
- Largest city: Athens

Area
  - Total: 432 sq mi (1,120 km^{2})
  - Land: 430 sq mi (1,100 km^{2})
  - Water: 2.1 sq mi (5.4 km^{2}) 0.5%

Population (2020)
  - Total: 53,276
  - Estimate (2025): 57,404 ▲
  - Density: 125.1/sq mi (48.3/km^{2})
- Time zone: UTC−5 (Eastern)
  - Summer (DST): UTC−4 (EDT)
- Congressional district: 3rd
- Website: mcminncountytn.gov

McMinn County is a county in the U.S. state of Tennessee. It is located in East Tennessee. As of the 2020 census, the population was 53,276. The county has a total area of 432 square miles (1,120 km^{2}). Most of the county is within the Ridge and Valley area of the Appalachian Mountains. Its county seat is Athens. McMinn County, along with Meigs County comprises the Athens, TN Micropolitan Statistical Area.

== History ==
McMinn County was created in 1819 from Indian lands and was named in honor of Joseph McMinn (1758–1824). McMinn was a militia commander during the Revolutionary War, a member of the territorial legislature, speaker of the state senate, and eventually governor of the state of Tennessee. McMinn died on October 17, 1824, and is buried at Shiloh Presbyterian Cemetery in Calhoun.

The first railroad in East Tennessee, the Hiwassee Railroad, began construction in McMinn County in the late 1830s, but was halted due to financial difficulties. Work was resumed by the East Tennessee and Georgia Railroad (ET&G) in 1849, and by the mid-1850s rail lines connected Chattanooga, Knoxville, and the Tri-Cities. The ET&G was headquartered in Athens before moving to Knoxville in 1855. A train depot from this early railroad period still stands in Niota. A number of communities sprang up along the railroads in subsequent years, most notably Etowah, where the L&N built a large depot in the early 1900s, and Englewood, which developed into a textile manufacturing center in the late 19th and early 20th centuries.

Like many East Tennessee counties, McMinn was polarized by the Civil War and the issue of secession. On June 8, 1861, the county voted against secession by a margin of 1,144 to 904. The county provided 12 regiments for the Union Army and eight for the Confederate Army during the course of the war.

On August 18, 1920, State Rep. Harry T. Burn of Niota cast the deciding vote in the Tennessee General Assembly to ratify the Nineteenth Amendment. Burn credited a letter from his mother, Febb Burn, for his decision to vote in favor of the amendment. McMinn County voters, although divided on the women's suffrage issue, reelected Burn to the state legislature three months later.

In August 1946, an uprising known as the Battle of Athens erupted when the McMinn County sheriff and several other county officials (who had ties to Memphis political boss E.H. Crump) tried to steal the election. A group of World War II veterans launched an armed assault on the jail in Athens, where the county officials had retreated with the ballot boxes. After an exchange of gunfire, the county officials turned over the ballot boxes, and the votes were counted in a public setting, proving the bipartisan reform ticket won the election.

On December 11, 1990, a crash involving 99 vehicles occurred along Interstate 75 near Calhoun in heavy fog, killing 12 and injuring 42. The accident, which occurred in an area prone to fog, was reportedly the largest motor vehicle crash in United States history at the time, in terms of the number of vehicles involved, and was blamed by some on the nearby Bowater (now Resolute Forest Products) paper mill.

== Geography ==
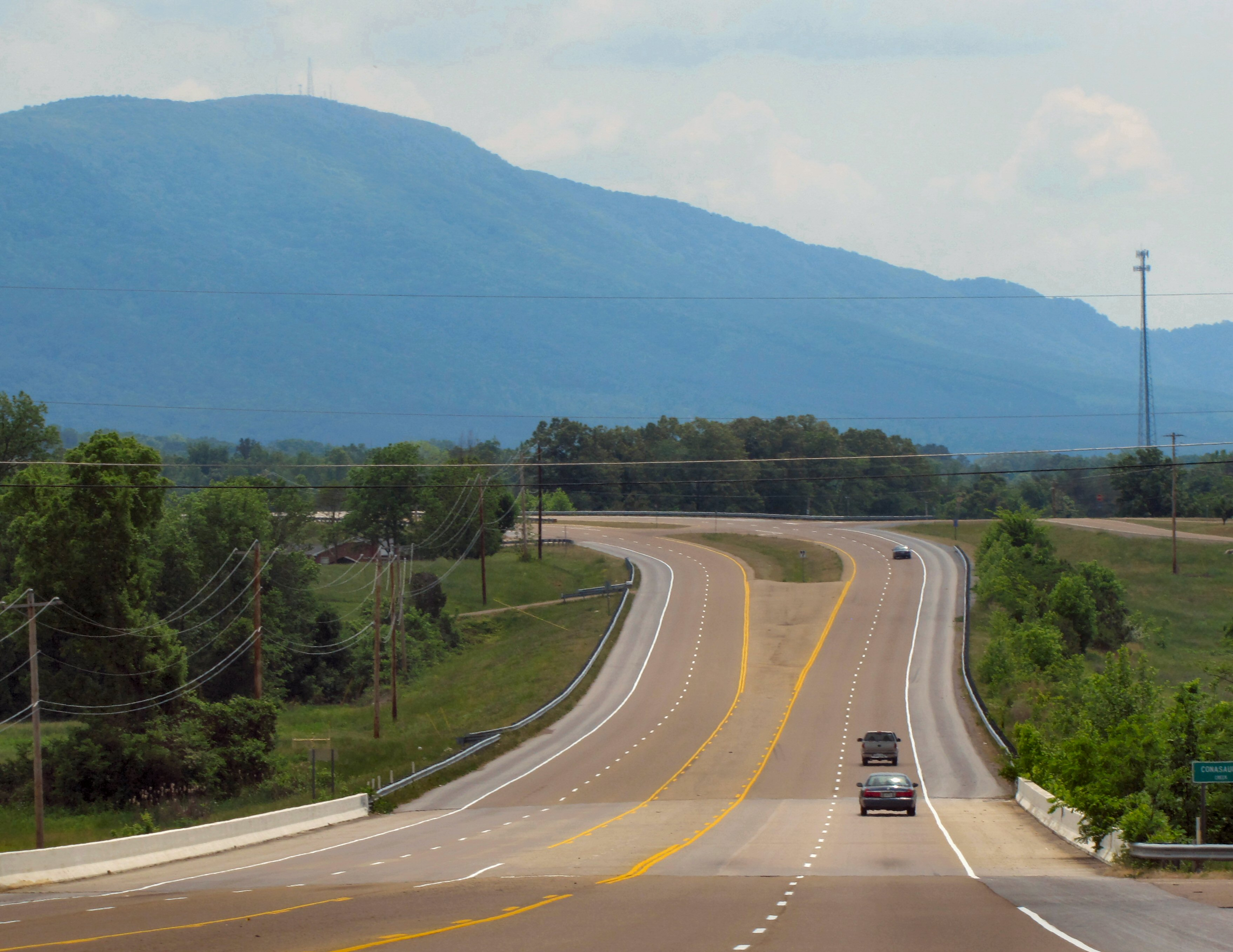
U.S. Route 411 near Etowah

According to the U.S. Census Bureau, the county has a total area of 432 square miles (1,120 km^{2}), of which 430 square miles (1,100 km^{2}) is land and 2.1 square miles (5.4 km^{2}) (0.5%) is water. Most of the county is within the Ridge and Valley province of the Appalachian Mountains, which is characterized by a series of parallel ridges separated by valleys oriented in a northeast-to-southwest direction. The Hiwassee River forms the county's border with Bradley County to the southwest. Starr Mountain, a large ridge in the southeastern part of the county on the edge of the Unicoi Mountains, part of the Blue Ridge Appalachian province, forms part of the county's border with Polk County to the south and Monroe County to the north and east.

=== Adjacent counties ===
- Roane County (north)
- Loudon County (northeast)
- Monroe County (east)
- Polk County (southeast)
- Bradley County (southwest)
- Meigs County (west)

=== National protected area ===
- Cherokee National Forest (part)

=== State protected area ===
- Chickamauga Wildlife Management Area (part)

== Demographics ==
Historical population
Census	Pop.	Note	%±
1820	1,623		—
1830	14,460		790.9%
1840	12,719		−12.0%
1850	13,906		9.3%
1860	13,555		−2.5%
1870	13,969		3.1%
1880	15,064		7.8%
1890	17,890		18.8%
1900	19,163		7.1%
1910	21,046		9.8%
1920	25,133		19.4%
1930	29,019		15.5%
1940	30,781		6.1%
1950	32,024		4.0%
1960	33,662		5.1%
1970	35,462		5.3%
1980	41,878		18.1%
1990	42,383		1.2%
2000	49,015		15.6%
2010	52,266		6.6%
2020	53,276		1.9%
2025 (est.)	57,404	▲	7.7%
U.S. Decennial Census; 1790–1960 1900–1990; 1990–2000 2010–2014

=== Racial and ethnic composition ===
McMinn County, Tennessee – Racial and ethnic composition Note: the US Census treats Hispanic/Latino as an ethnic category. This table excludes Latinos from the racial categories and assigns them to a separate category. Hispanics/Latinos may be of any race.
Race / Ethnicity (NH = Non-Hispanic)	Pop 1980	Pop 1990	Pop 2000	Pop 2010	Pop 2020	% 1980	% 1990	% 2000	% 2010	% 2020
White alone (NH)	39,428	39,949	45,030	47,273	45,993	94.15%	94.26%	91.87%	90.45%	86.33%
Black or African American alone (NH)	2,039	2,041	2,172	2,021	1,842	4.87%	4.82%	4.43%	3.87%	3.46%
Native American or Alaska Native alone (NH)	68	95	121	158	140	0.16%	0.22%	0.25%	0.30%	0.26%
Asian alone (NH)	83	120	340	385	430	0.20%	0.28%	0.69%	0.74%	0.81%
Native Hawaiian or Pacific Islander alone (NH)	x	x	4	8	17	x	x	0.01%	0.02%	0.03%
Other race alone (NH)	35	4	11	42	107	0.08%	0.01%	0.02%	0.08%	0.20%
Mixed race or Multiracial (NH)	x	x	453	897	2,586	x	x	0.92%	1.72%	4.85%
Hispanic or Latino (any race)	225	174	884	1,482	2,161	0.54%	0.41%	1.80%	2.84%	4.06%
Total	41,878	42,383	49,015	52,266	53,276	100.00%	100.00%	100.00%	100.00%	100.00%

=== 2020 census ===
As of the 2020 census, the county had a population of 53,276. The median age was 43.2 years, with 21.1% of residents under the age of 18 and 20.2% 65 years of age or older. For every 100 females there were 95.8 males, and for every 100 females age 18 and over there were 93.4 males age 18 and over.

The racial makeup of the county was 87.4% White, 3.5% Black or African American, 0.3% American Indian and Alaska Native, 0.8% Asian, <0.1% Native Hawaiian and Pacific Islander, 1.7% from some other race, and 6.2% from two or more races. Hispanic or Latino residents of any race comprised 4.1% of the population.

38.3% of residents lived in urban areas, while 61.7% lived in rural areas.

There were 21,340 households in the county, of which 28.8% had children under the age of 18 living in them. Of all households, 49.7% were married-couple households, 17.8% were households with a male householder and no spouse or partner present, and 26.4% were households with a female householder and no spouse or partner present. About 27.7% of all households were made up of individuals and 13.0% had someone living alone who was 65 years of age or older.

There were 23,934 housing units, of which 10.8% were vacant. Among occupied housing units, 71.8% were owner-occupied and 28.2% were renter-occupied. The homeowner vacancy rate was 2.0% and the rental vacancy rate was 6.3%.

=== 2010 census ===
As of the census of 2010, there were 52,266 people, 20,865 households, and 14,632 families living in the county. The population density was 121.55 persons per square mile and the housing unit density was 48.52 units per square mile. The racial makeup of the county was 91.96% White, 3.95% Black, 0.34% Native American, 0.74% Asian, 0.02% Pacific Islander, and 1.79% from two or more races. Those of Hispanic of Latino origins made up 2.84% of the population.

Of all of the households, 26.93% had children under the age of 18 living in them, 53.88% were married couples living together, 4.86% had a male householder with no wife present, 11.38% had a female householder with no husband present, and 29.87% were non families. 26.02% of all households were made up of individuals, and 11.65% had someone living alone who was 65 years of age or older. The average household size was 2.46 and the average family size was 2.94.

The population was distributed with 22.57% under the age of 18, 60.57% ages 18 to 64, and 16.86% age 65 years and older. The median age was 40.4 years. 51.43% of the population were females and 48.57% were males.

The median household income was $37,146 and the median family income was $47,726. Males had a median income of $38,459 versus $31,342 for females. The per capita income for the county was $19,796. About 13.7% of families and 17.3% of the population were below the poverty line, including 24.0% of those under the age of 18 and 11.9% of those over the age of 65.

=== 2000 census ===
Age pyramid McMinn County

At the 2000 census, there were 49,015 people, 19,721 households and 14,317 families living in the county. The population density was 114 people per square mile (44 people/km^{2}). There were 21,626 housing units at an average density of 50 units per square mile (19/km^{2}).

The racial makeup of the county was 92.72% White, 4.48% Black or African American, 0.27% Native American, 0.70% Asian, 0.02% Pacific Islander, 0.75% from other races, and 1.06% from two or more races. 1.80% of the population were Hispanic or Latino of any race.

There were 19,721 households, of which 31.40% had children under the age of 18 living with them, 58.70% were married couples living together, 10.60% had a female householder with no husband present, and 27.40% were non-families. 24.40% of all households were made up of individuals, and 10.40% had someone living alone who was 65 years of age or older. The average household size was 2.45, and the average family size was 2.90.

Age distribution was 23.90% under the age of 18, 8.40% from 18 to 24, 28.50% from 25 to 44, 24.80% from 45 to 64, and 14.30% who were 65 years of age or older. The median age was 38 years. For every 100 females there were 93.40 males. For every 100 females age 18 and over, there were 89.80 males.

The median household income was $31,919, and the median family income was $38,992. Males had a median income of $31,051 versus $20,524 for females. The per capita income for the county was $16,725. About 10.90% of families and 14.50% of the population were below the poverty line, including 18.20% of those under age 18 and 16.80% of those age 65 or over.

== Communities ==
=== Cities ===
- Athens (county seat)
- Etowah
- Niota
- Sweetwater

=== Towns ===
- Calhoun
- Englewood

=== Census-designated place ===
- Delano (part)
- Riceville

=== Unincorporated communities ===
- Claxton
- Conasauga
- Goodsprings
- Liberty Hill
- Mount Verd
- Reagan
- Regret (historical)
- Spring Creek
- Williamsburg

== Schools ==
The 1870 Tennessee constitution prevented black and white children from attending the same public schools. In 1875, McMinn County had 56 white schools and 10 "colored" schools. After the Civil Rights Act of 1964 was passed, Tennessee began to integrate schools.

McMinn County Schools operates public schools serving most of the county for grades K–12. Included are McMinn County High School and McMinn Central High School. In 2020, the district had 5,493 students. It had two high schools, seven middle schools, seven elementary schools, and seven preschools. As of 2022, a total of 31% of elementary school students tested at or above the proficient level for reading, and 40% tested did so for math. Also, 31% of middle school students tested at or above the proficient level for reading, and 40% did so for math. Furthermore 34% of high school students tested at or above the proficient level for reading, and 22% did so for math.

Athens City Schools and the Etowah School District, respectively, serve their areas for grades K–8, with McMinn County Schools operating the high schools for those respective cities.

Tennessee Wesleyan University, a private Methodist university, is located in Athens, Tennessee.

== Politics ==
In the 2024 United States Presidential Election in Tennessee, 81.73% of voters in the county voted for Donald Trump, who also won the popular vote nationwide. In the 2020 US presidential election, 79.7% of voters in the county voted for Donald Trump, who attracted 46.9% of the vote nationwide. Following Trump, in the county vote were Democrat Joe Biden, Libertarian Jo Jorgensen, coal mining business executive Don Blankenship, and rapper Kanye West.

United States presidential election results for McMinn County, Tennessee
Year	Republican		Democratic		Third party(ies)	
Year	No.	%	No.	%	No.	%
1912	667	30.98%	912	42.36%	574	26.66%
1916	1,726	61.34%	1,088	38.66%	0	0.00%
1920	2,800	62.63%	1,636	36.59%	35	0.78%
1924	2,654	58.85%	1,617	35.85%	239	5.30%
1928	4,421	68.59%	2,011	31.20%	14	0.22%
1932	2,790	50.77%	2,630	47.86%	75	1.36%
1936	4,310	51.11%	4,077	48.35%	45	0.53%
1940	3,901	42.77%	5,192	56.92%	28	0.31%
1944	3,091	41.07%	4,435	58.93%	0	0.00%
1948	4,432	57.84%	3,016	39.36%	214	2.79%
1952	5,778	62.39%	3,440	37.15%	43	0.46%
1956	6,075	59.83%	3,950	38.90%	128	1.26%
1960	6,585	61.16%	4,111	38.19%	70	0.65%
1964	5,624	51.93%	5,207	48.07%	0	0.00%
1968	6,098	52.92%	2,889	25.07%	2,535	22.00%
1972	7,423	70.56%	2,838	26.98%	259	2.46%
1976	6,638	48.34%	7,020	51.12%	74	0.54%
1980	7,825	57.76%	5,460	40.30%	262	1.93%
1984	9,604	64.83%	5,141	34.71%	68	0.46%
1988	8,462	64.70%	4,568	34.93%	48	0.37%
1992	7,453	46.61%	6,682	41.79%	1,855	11.60%
1996	7,655	51.78%	5,987	40.50%	1,142	7.72%
2000	10,155	61.17%	6,142	37.00%	303	1.83%
2004	11,980	66.54%	5,891	32.72%	132	0.73%
2008	12,989	69.13%	5,541	29.49%	259	1.38%
2012	12,967	72.71%	4,609	25.84%	258	1.45%
2016	14,691	78.33%	3,510	18.72%	554	2.95%
2020	18,198	79.66%	4,361	19.09%	285	1.25%
2024	19,673	81.73%	4,207	17.48%	192	0.80%

== See also ==
- National Register of Historic Places listings in McMinn County, Tennessee
