= McMinn County High School =

American public high school

Location
- 2215 Congress Parkway; Athens, Tennessee 37303; United States; 35.442°N 84.633°W

Information
- Type: Public
- Motto: "Be good, Be kind. GO TRIBE"
- Established: 1903
- School district: McMinn County School System
- Principal: Jake Roberts
- Faculty: 82
- Teaching staff: 82.00 (FTE)
- Grades: 9–12
- Student to teacher ratio: 15.94
- Colors: Black and gold
- Athletics: Football, Rugby (Boys and Girls), Basketball (Boys and Girls), Soccer (Boys and Girls), Swimming, Baseball, Softball, Volleyball, Wrestling, Tennis, Golf, Track, and Bowling
- Team name: Cherokees
- Website: Official website

McMinn County High School is a four-year public high school founded in 1903 in Athens, Tennessee. It is a part of McMinn County Schools. In the 2020–2021 school year, there were over 1,500 students enrolled.

== History ==
McMinn County High School was created in the early 20th century as part of Athens Female College. The McMinn county court purchased the female school facility on April 20, 1903, and turned it into a public high school. The first graduating class in 1903 included seven students. A new facility was built in 1926 on West Madison Street in Athens.

In 1951, McMinn County High School suffered a fire that destroyed the wing opposite Madison Avenue. The gymnasium was unaffected, while the auditorium and in general half of the school building were. Overall damages were about $200,000. As a result the county government sought to have a $300,000 bond passed so it could build a new school. Classes were held at nearby Keith Memorial Methodist Church and the National Guard Armory. Another minor fire in a part of the building over the school library delayed the opening of the school year in August 1952. Students attended classes at Tennessee Wesleyan College for two weeks and did not have classes for the next two weeks. When school was finally opened, classes again met at Keith Memorial Methodist Church and the National Guard Armory. The school joined the Southern Association of Colleges and Secondary Schools in 1954.

McMinn County High School had a freshman class of over 300 students in 1955 and over 400 students in 1956. The school went from a total enrollment of 500 students in 1954 to over 1,200 students in 1960. Additional classrooms and a new gymnasium were built in 1960. Cook High School was absorbed in 1967 and Calhoun High School in 1978. In 1980, a new $10 million complex opened on Congress Parkway in Athens with new athletic facilities completed later.

== Clubs ==
McMinn County High School has 28 recognized clubs.

SkillsUSA host an annual national championship event known as the NLSC, National Leadership and Skills Conference. The SkillsUSA Championship is the showcase for the best career and technical students in the nation. Contests begin locally and continue through the state and national levels.

McMinn County High School's "Career and Technical Center" is the home of the only SkillsUSA Quiz Bowl team in the United States to have four (2003, 2004, 2005, 2006) back to back gold medal National Championships.
